= Parliament of Romania =

Bicameral legislature of Romania

Coordinates: 44°25′38″N 26°05′15″E

Parliament of Romania Parlamentul României
- 10th legislature

Type
- Type: Bicameral
- Houses: Senate; Chamber of Deputies

History
- Founded: 1862; 164 years ago 1990; 36 years ago (current form)

Leadership
- President of the Senate: Mircea Abrudean, PNL since 24 June 2025
- President of the Chamber of Deputies: Sorin Grindeanu, PSD since 24 June 2025

Structure
- Seats: 134 Senators; 330 Deputies
- Senate political groups: Government (Niculescu cabinet) (40): PSD (40); Supported by (42): PNL (27) (Note: PNL (23); Independent (4)); UDMR (10); PACE (3) (Note: Independent (3)); Independent (2) (Note: ): Independent (2)); Opposition (52): AUR (30) (Note: AUR (28); Independent (2)); USR (18); Independent (4) (Note: POT (1); SOS RO (1); Independent (2))
- Chamber of Deputies political groups: Government (92): PSD (92) (Note: PSD (84); PUCL (3); Independent (5)); Supported by (111): PNL (55) (Note: PNL (51); Independent (4)); UDMR (21); National minorities (17) (Note: ALAR (1); AMR (1); CRLR (1); FCER (1); FCR (1); FDGR/DFDR (1); PRPE (1); UAR (1); UBBR (1); UCR (1); UCRR (1); UDSCR (1); UDTTMR (1); UER (1); UPR (1); USR (1); UUR (1)); UPR (16) (Note: POT (6); Independent (10)); AMT (1); Opposition (127): AUR (62) (Note: AUR (61); Independent (1)); USR (40); SOS RO (13); Independent (13) (Note: RO.AS.IT. (1); Independent (8)); UNIT (4)

Elections
- Senate voting system: 1992–2008, 2016–present: Closed list, D'Hondt method 2008–2016: Mixed member proportional representation
- Chamber of Deputies voting system: 1992–2008, 2016–present: Closed list, D'Hondt method 2008–2016: Mixed member proportional representation
- Last Senate election: 1 December 2024
- Last Chamber of Deputies election: 1 December 2024
- Next Senate election: On or before 2028
- Next Chamber of Deputies election: On or before 2028

Meeting place
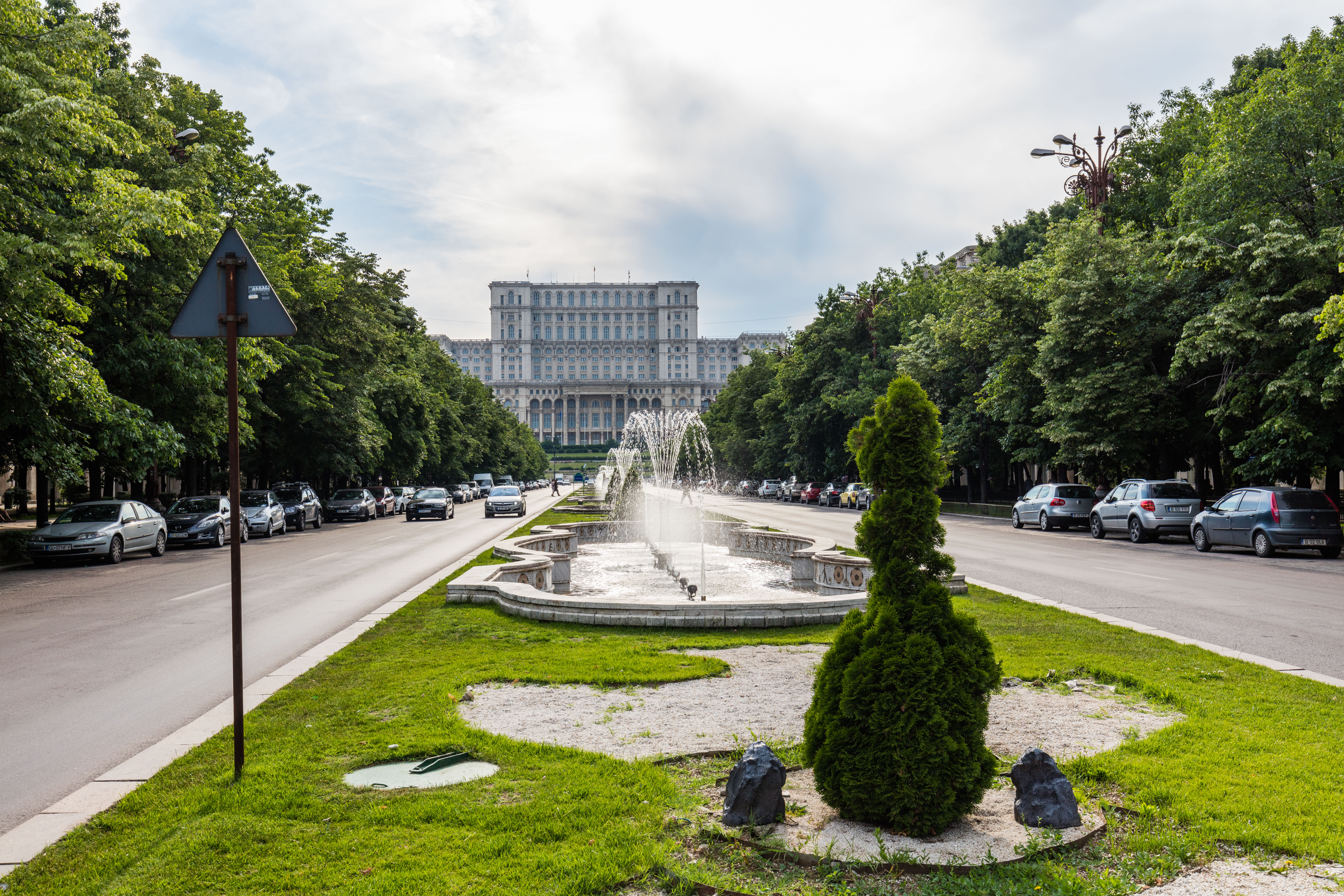
- Palace of the Parliament, Bucharest, Romania

Website
- http://www.parlament.ro/

The Parliament of Romania (Romanian: Parlamentul României) is the national bicameral legislature of Romania, consisting of the Chamber of Deputies (Camera Deputaților) and the Senate (Senat). It meets at the Palace of the Parliament in Bucharest, the capital.

Prior to the modification of the Constitution in 2003, the two houses had identical attributes. A text of a law had to be approved by both houses. If the text differed, a special commission (Romanian: comisie de mediere) was formed by deputies and senators, that "negotiated" between the two houses the form of the future law. The report of this commission had to be approved in a joint session of the Parliament.

After the 2003 referendum, a law still has to be approved by both houses, but each house has designated matters it gets to deliberate before the other, in capacity of "deciding chamber" (Romanian: cameră decizională). If that first chamber adopts a law proposal (relating to its competences), it is passed on to the other one, which can approve or reject. If it makes amendments, the bill is sent back to the deciding chamber, the decision of which is final.

In 2009, a referendum was held to consult the population about turning the parliament into a unicameral body and reducing the number of representatives to 300. Although the referendum passed, the results are not binding, a referendum explicitly mentioning the modification of the constitution being required to achieve this.

== History ==
The parliamentary history of Romania starts in May 1831 in Wallachia, where a constitutional document was adopted, more specifically Regulamentul Organic ("The Organic Statute" or "The Organic Regulation"); less than a year later, in January 1832, this same statute was implemented in Moldavia as well. The organic regulation laid the foundations for the parliamentary institution in the Romanian Principalities.

The Paris Convention of 19 August 1858 and, especially, Statutul Dezvoltător ("The Expanding Statute") of that convention (which introduced a bicameral parliament, by founding Corpul Ponderator, later renamed Senat), adopted on the initiative of prince (Domnitor) Alexandru Ioan Cuza, by means of a plebiscite (i.e. referendum) in 1864, perfected and enlarged the principle of national representation. Under the political regime established by the Paris Convention, the legislative power faced an obvious process of modernization, and the legislative power as National Representation, which operated in accordance with the organization and operation mode of parliaments in Western Europe at that time.

The historical process of formation of the Parliament of Romania in the modern age strongly boosted the affirmation of national sovereignty, subsequently leading to the Union of the two Romanian Principalities (i.e. Wallachia and Moldavia) in 1859. Under the dome of the Romanian Parliament, on 9 May 1877, the Declaration of Independence of Romania was read, and, in 1920, the documents of union with Transylvania and Bessarabia under the Treaty of Trianon (4 June 1920) were read, the formal beginning of Greater Romania, the enlarged interwar Kingdom of Romania (which also included the entire historical region of Bukovina as per the Treaty of Saint-German-en-Laye from 1919).

In February 1938, amid the rather chaotic European political atmosphere which eventually led to World War II, King Carol II, who always tended to favour his own personal rule over parliamentary democracy, imposed a rule of authoritarian monarchy. Under the royal dictatorship, the parliament became merely a decorative body, deprived of its main attributes.

Carol II abdicated in September 1940, and the succeeding National Legionary State suspended the parliament. The National Legionary State as such lasted less than five months, but it was succeeded by Ion Antonescu's military dictatorship, and the parliament still remained suspended. After 23 August 1944, under the pressure of Soviet and other communist forces, the parliament was re-organized as a single legislative body, the Assembly of Deputies, changed under the 1948 constitution, into the Great National Assembly, a merely formal body, totally subordinate to the power of the Romanian Communist Party (PCR).

The Romanian Revolution of December 1989 opened the road for Romanians to restore authentic pluralistic representative democracy, respecting human rights, and observing the separation of powers and the rulers' responsibility before representative bodies. Thanks to the documents issued by the provisional revolutionary power, Romania returned to a bicameral parliamentary system, represented politically as such both by the Chamber of Deputies and the Senate. All these stipulations can be found in the country's new Constitution, approved by referendum in 1991.

During more than a decade of post-communist transition, the Chamber of Deputies and Senate debated and adopted numerous laws and regulations aimed at reforming the entire society on a democratic basis, guaranteeing respect of fundamental human rights, promoting reform and privatization, consolidating free market economic institutions and those of a state ruled by law, which led to Romania's integration into such notable international institutions as the North Atlantic Treaty Organization (NATO) in 2004 and the European Union (EU) three years later in 2007.

=== List of presidents of the Houses ===
Last election of the President of the Chamber of Deputies: November 2021

The 1866, 1923, and 1938 Constitution of Romania state that the assembly presidents are elected at the beginning of each session. This tradition was kept in the early years of the People's Republic. In modern times, both presidents of the Chamber of Deputies and of the Senate are elected for the entire duration of that house's term. Under special circumstances the presidents of the houses can be revoked.

The political stance of the presidents of the assembly prior to the development of a modern party system is shown by:

C (Conservative)	MC (Moderate Conservative)
RL (Radical Liberal)	ML (Moderate Liberal)

The political stance of the presidents of the assembly after the development of a modern party system is shown by:

PNL = National Liberal Party (present-day)/historical	PC = Conservative Party
PNR/PȚB/PNȚ/PNȚ-CD = Romanian National Party/Bessarabian Peasants' Party/National Peasants' Party/Christian Democratic National Peasants' Party	PP = People's Party
PCD = Conservative-Democratic Party	PCP = Progressive Conservative Party
PND = Democratic Nationalist Party	PNC = National Christian Party
FRN = National Renaissance Front (from 1940 PN; Party of the Nation)	FP = Ploughmen's Front
FSN = National Salvation Front
PMR = Romanian Workers' Party (from 1965 PCR; Romanian Communist Party)	PD/PDL = Democratic Party/Democratic Liberal Party
PDSR = Party of Social Democracy in Romania (from 2001 PSD; Social Democratic Party)	ALDE = Alliance of Liberals and Democrats
USR = USR PLUS/Save Romania Union	Mil. = Military
Ind. = Independent

==== 19th century ====
El. yr.	Leg. no.	LOWER HOUSE							UPPER HOUSE						
El. yr.	Leg. no.	#	Name	Portrait	Born-Died	Took office	Left office	Party	#	Name	Portrait	Born-Died	Took office	Left office	Party
1862	I	Assembly of Deputies							not yet established						
1862	I	1	Metropolitan-primate Nifon Rusailă			24 January 1862	2 May 1864	Ind.	not yet established						
1864	II	2	Alexandru Emanoil Florescu		1822–1907	29 December 1864	25 June 1865	C	Corpul Ponderator						
1864	II	2	Alexandru Emanoil Florescu		1822–1907	29 December 1864	25 June 1865	C	1	Metropolitan-primate Nifon Rusailă			6 December 1864	1 June 1866	Ind.
1864	II	3	Emanoil Costache Epureanu		1823–1880	12 December 1865	3 January 1866	C	1	Metropolitan-primate Nifon Rusailă			6 December 1864	1 June 1866	Ind.
1864	II	4	Nicolae Catargiu		1830–1882	9 January 1866	12 February 1866	C	1	Metropolitan-primate Nifon Rusailă			6 December 1864	1 June 1866	Ind.
1866 (Apr)	III	(3)	Emanoil Costache Epureanu		1823–1880	9 May 1866	6 July 1866	C	Senat						
1866 (Apr)	III	(3)	Emanoil Costache Epureanu		1823–1880	9 May 1866	6 July 1866	C	(1)	Metropolitan-primate Nifon Rusailă			1 June 1866	6 June 1868	Ind.
1866 (Nov)	IV	5	Lascăr Catargiu		1823–1899	12 December 1866	1 November 1867	C	(1)	Metropolitan-primate Nifon Rusailă			1 June 1866	6 June 1868	Ind.
1866 (Nov)	IV	6	Anastasie Fătu		1816–1886	15 January 1868	15 November 1868	RL	2	Ștefan Golescu		1809–1874	6 September 1868	15 November 1868	RL
1866 (Nov)	IV	7	Ion C. Brătianu		1821–1891	18 November 1868	29 January 1869	RL	3	Nicolae Golescu		1810–1877	18 November 1868	9 July 1869	RL
1869	V	8	Costache Negri		1812–1876	8 May 1869	17 November 1869	ML	4	Alexandru Plagino		1821–1894	2 September 1869	4 March 1871	MC
1869	V	9	Grigore Balș		–1895	20 November 1869	1 May 1870	MC	4	Alexandru Plagino		1821–1894	2 September 1869	4 March 1871	MC
1870	VI	10	Gheorghe Costa-Foru		1820–1876	2 July 1870	3 February 1871	C	4	Alexandru Plagino		1821–1894	2 September 1869	4 March 1871	MC
1870	VI	11	Nicolae Păcleanu			5 February 1871	16 March 1871	RL	4	Alexandru Plagino		1821–1894	2 September 1869	4 March 1871	MC
1871	VII	12	Dimitrie Ghica		1816–1897	26 May 1871	17 February 1876	C	(1)	Metropolitan-primate Nifon Rusailă			4 March 1871	5 May 1875	Ind.
1875	VIII	12	Dimitrie Ghica		1816–1897	26 May 1871	17 February 1876	C	5	Metropolitan-primate Calinic Miclescu			9 June 1875	25 March 1879	Ind.
1875	VIII	13	Constantin N. Brăiloiu		1809/10–1889	18 February 1876	3 May 1876	C	5	Metropolitan-primate Calinic Miclescu			9 June 1875	25 March 1879	Ind.
1876	IX	14	Constantin A. Rosetti		1816–1885	25 June 1876	26 May 1878	PNL	5	Metropolitan-primate Calinic Miclescu			9 June 1875	25 March 1879	Ind.
1876	IX	15	Gheorghe Vernescu		1829–1900	6 June 1878	15 November 1878	PNL	5	Metropolitan-primate Calinic Miclescu			9 June 1875	25 March 1879	Ind.
1876	IX	(14)	Constantin A. Rosetti		1816–1885	17 November 1878	9 June 1881	PNL	5	Metropolitan-primate Calinic Miclescu			9 June 1875	25 March 1879	Ind.
1879	X	(14)	Constantin A. Rosetti		1816–1885	17 November 1878	9 June 1881	PNL	6	Constantin Bosianu		1815–1882	25 May 1879	15 November 1879	PNL
1879	X	(14)	Constantin A. Rosetti		1816–1885	17 November 1878	9 June 1881	PNL	7	Dimitrie Ghica		1816–1897	17 November 1879	8 September 1888	PNL
1881	XI	16	Dimitrie C. Brătianu		1818–1892	9 June 1881	21 October 1882	PNL	7	Dimitrie Ghica		1816–1897	17 November 1879	8 September 1888	PNL
1881	XI	17	Dimitrie Lecca		1832–1888	21 October 1882	5 March 1883	PNL	7	Dimitrie Ghica		1816–1897	17 November 1879	8 September 1888	PNL
1883	XII	(14)	Constantin A. Rosetti		1816–1885	16 May 1883	17 October 1883	PNL	7	Dimitrie Ghica		1816–1897	17 November 1879	8 September 1888	PNL
1883	XII	(17)	Dimitrie Lecca		1832–1888	19 October 1883	4 July 1888	PNL	7	Dimitrie Ghica		1816–1897	17 November 1879	8 September 1888	PNL
1884	XIII	(17)	Dimitrie Lecca		1832–1888	19 October 1883	4 July 1888	PNL	7	Dimitrie Ghica		1816–1897	17 November 1879	8 September 1888	PNL
1888	XIV	(5)	Lascăr Catargiu		1823–1899	10 November 1888	14 January 1889	PC	8	Ion Emanoil Florescu		1819–1893	4 November 1888	7 December 1889	PC
1888	XIV	18	Constantin Grădișteanu		1833–1890	19 January 1889	16 November 1889	PC	9	Nicolae Kretzulescu		1812–1900	13 December 1889	6 June 1890	PC
1888	XIV	19	Gheorghe Grigore Cantacuzino		1833–1913	16 November 1889	22 February 1891	PC	(8)	Ion Emanoil Florescu		1819–1893	17 November 1890	21 February 1891	PC
1891	XV	20	Gheorghe Rosnovanu		1832–1904	3 May 1891	11 December 1891	PC	10	Constantin Boerescu		1845–1928	1 March 1891	11 December 1891	PC
1892	XVI	21	Gheorghe Manu		1833–1911	26 February 1892	24 October 1895	PC	11	Gheorghe Grigore Cantacuzino		1833–1913	25 February 1892	24 October 1895	PC
1895	XVII	22	Petre S. Aurelian		1833–1909	9 December 1895	21 November 1896	PNL	(7)	Dimitrie Ghica		1816–1897	9 December 1895	15 February 1897	PNL
1895	XVII	22	Petre S. Aurelian		1833–1909	9 December 1895	21 November 1896	PNL	12	Dimitrie Alexandru Sturdza		1833–1914	20 February 1897	31 March 1897	PNL
1895	XVII	23	Dimitrie Gianni		1832–1902	23 November 1896	21 April 1899	PNL	13	Eugeniu Stătescu		1836–1905	31 March 1897	18 November 1897	PNL
1895	XVII	23	Dimitrie Gianni		1832–1902	23 November 1896	21 April 1899	PNL	14	Nicolae Gane		1838–1916	18 November 1897	21 April 1899	PNL
1899	XVIII	24	Constantin Olănescu		1845–1928	13 June 1899	21 September 1900	PC	(10)	Constantin Boerescu		1836–1908	13 June 1899	14 February 1901	PC
1899	XVIII	(19)	Gheorghe Grigore Cantacuzino		1833–1913	25 September 1900	14 February 1901	PC	(10)	Constantin Boerescu		1836–1908	13 June 1899	14 February 1901	PC

==== 20th century ====
El. yr.	Leg. no.	LOWER HOUSE							UPPER HOUSE						
El. yr.	Leg. no.	#	Name	Portrait	Born-Died	Took office	Left office	Party	#	Name	Portrait	Born-Died	Took office	Left office	Party
1901	XIX	Assembly of Deputies							Senate						
1901	XIX	25	Mihail Pherekyde		1842–1926	24 March 1901	9 December 1904	PNL	(13)	Eugeniu Stătescu		1836–1905	24 March 1901	15 November 1902	PNL
1901	XIX	26	Ștefan Șendrea		1842–1907	9 December 1904	23 December 1904	PNL	15	Petre S. Aurelian		1833–1909	16 November 1902	23 December 1904	PNL
1905	XX	27	Grigore Trandafil		1840–1907	25 February 1905	23 February 1907	PC	(10)	Constantin Boerescu		1836–1908	25 February 1905	26 April 1907	PC
1905	XX	28	Constantin Cantacuzino-Pașcanu		1856–1927	26 February 1907	26 April 1907	PC	(10)	Constantin Boerescu		1836–1908	25 February 1905	26 April 1907	PC
1907	XXI	(25)	Mihail Pherekyde		1842–1926	8 June 1907	15 December 1909	PNL	(15)	Petre S. Aurelian		1833–1909	9 June 1907	24 January 1909	PNL
1907	XXI	29	Basile M. Missir		1843–1929	15 December 1909	16 February 1910	PNL	(15)	Petre S. Aurelian		1833–1909	9 June 1907	24 January 1909	PNL
1907	XXI	(25)	Mihail Pherekyde		1842–1926	16 February 1910	10 January 1911	PNL	16	Constantin Budișteanu		1838–1911	28 January 1909	10 January 1911	PNL
1911	XXII	(24)	Constantin Olănescu		1845–1928	8 March 1911	17 October 1912	PC	(11)	Gheorghe Grigore Cantacuzino		1833–1913	10 March 1911	23 March 1913	PC
1912	XXIII	(28)	Constantin Cantacuzino-Pașcanu		1856–1927	1 December 1912	11 January 1914	PCD	(11)	Gheorghe Grigore Cantacuzino		1833–1913	10 March 1911	23 March 1913	PC
1912	XXIII	(28)	Constantin Cantacuzino-Pașcanu		1856–1927	1 December 1912	11 January 1914	PCD	17	Theodor Rosetti		1837–1932	27 March 1913	3 July 1913	PC
1912	XXIII	(28)	Constantin Cantacuzino-Pașcanu		1856–1927	1 December 1912	11 January 1914	PCD	18	Ion Lahovari		1844–1915	3 July 1913	11 January 1914	PC
1914	XXIV	(25)	Mihail Pherekyde		1842–1926	21 February 1914	11 December 1916	PNL	19	Basile M. Missir		1843–1929	21 February 1914	9 December 1916	PNL
1914	XXIV	30	Vasile C. Morțun		1860–1919	11 December 1916	25 April 1918	PNL	20	Emanoil Porumbaru		1845–1921	9 December 1916	25 April 1918	PNL
1918	XXV	31	Constantin Meissner		1854–1942	5 June 1918	5 November 1918	PCP	21	Dimitrie I. Dobrescu		1869–1948	4 June 1918	5 November 1918	PCP
1919	XXVI	32	Alexandru Vaida-Voevod		1872–1950	28 November 1919	1 December 1919	PNR	22	Paul Bujor		1862–1952	28 December 1918	26 March 1920	PȚB
1919	XXVI	33	Nicolae Iorga		1871–1940	9 December 1919	26 March 1920	PND	22	Paul Bujor		1862–1952	28 December 1918	26 March 1920	PȚB
1920	XXVII	34	Duiliu Zamfirescu		1858–1922	30 June 1920	22 January 1922	PP	23	Constantin Coandă		1857–1932	22 June 1920	22 January 1922	PP
1922	XXVIII	35	Mihail Orleanu		1859–1942	6 April 1922	27 March 1926	PNL	24	Mihail Pherekyde		1842–1926	31 March 1922	24 January 1926	PNL
1922	XXVIII	35	Mihail Orleanu		1859–1942	6 April 1922	27 March 1926	PNL	25	Constantin I. Nicolaescu		1861–1945	3 February 1926	27 March 1926	PNL
1926	XXIX	36	Petre P. Negulescu		1870–1951	10 July 1926	5 June 1927	PP	(23)	Constantin Coandă		1857–1932	8 July 1926	5 June 1927	PP
1927	XXX	37	Nicolae Săveanu		1866–1952	30 July 1927	10 November 1928	PNL	26	Constantin I. Nicolaescu		1861–1945	18 June 1927	10 November 1928	PNL
1928	XXXI	38	Ștefan Cicio Pop		1865–1934	23 December 1928	30 April 1931	PNȚ	27	Traian Bratu		1875–1940	23 December 1928	30 April 1931	PNȚ
1931	XXXII	39	Dimitrie Pompeiu		1873–1954	20 June 1931	10 June 1932	PND	28	Mihail Sadoveanu		1880–1961	18 June 1931	10 June 1932	Ind.
1932	XXXIII	(38)	Ștefan Cicio Pop		1865–1934	10 August 1932	18 November 1933	PNȚ	29	Neculai Costăchescu		1876–1939	4 August 1932	18 November 1933	PNȚ
1933	XXXIV	(37)	Nicolae Săveanu		1866–1952	10 February 1934	19 November 1937	PNL	31	Leonte Moldovan		1865–1943	10 February 1934	15 November 1935	PNL
1934	XXXV	(37)	Nicolae Săveanu		1866–1952	10 February 1934	19 November 1937	PNL	31	Leonte Moldovan		1865–1943	10 February 1934	15 November 1935	PNL
1934	XXXV	(37)	Nicolae Săveanu		1866–1952	10 February 1934	19 November 1937	PNL	32	Constantin Dimitriu-Dovlecel		1872–1945	15 November 1935	15 November 1936	PNL
1934	XXXV	(37)	Nicolae Săveanu		1866–1952	10 February 1934	19 November 1937	PNL	33	Alexandru Lapedatu			16 November 1936	20 March 1937	PNL
1937	XXXVI	(37)	Nicolae Săveanu		1866–1952	10 February 1934	19 November 1937	PNL	33	Alexandru Lapedatu			16 November 1936	20 March 1937	PNL
1939	XXXVII	(32)	Alexandru Vaida-Voevod		1872–1950	9 June 1939	5 September 1940	FRN/PN	34	Nicolae Iorga		1871–1940	9 June 1939	13 June 1939	Ind.
1939	XXXVII	(32)	Alexandru Vaida-Voevod		1872–1950	9 June 1939	5 September 1940	FRN/PN	35	Constantin Argetoianu		1871–1955	15 June 1939	5 August 1940	FNR/PN
1946	XXXVIII	40	Mihail Sadoveanu		1880–1961	5 December 1946	24 February 1948	BPD	suspended						
1948	XXXIX	Great National Assembly							abolished						
1948	XXXIX	41	Gheorghe Apostol		1913–2010	7 April 1948	11 June 1948	PMR	abolished						
1948	XXXIX	42	Constantin Agiu		1891–1961	11 June 1948	27 December 1948	PMR	abolished						
1948	XXXIX	43	Constantin Pîrvulescu		1895–1992	27 December 1948	5 July 1949	PMR	abolished						
1948	XXXIX	44	Dumitru Petrescu			5 July 1949	28 December 1949	PMR	abolished						
1948	XXXIX	45	Alexandru Drăghici			28 December 1949	26 January 1950	PMR	abolished						
1948	XXXIX	(44)	Dumitru Petrescu			26 January 1950	29 May 1950	PMR	abolished						
1948	XXXIX	46	Constantin Doncea		1904–1973	29 May 1950	6 September 1950	PMR	abolished						
1948	XXXIX	(41)	Gheorghe Apostol		1913–2010	6 September 1950	5 April 1951	PMR	abolished						
1948	XXXIX	47	Ioan Vințe		1910–1996	5 April 1951	26 March 1952	PMR	abolished						
1948	XXXIX	(41)	Gheorghe Apostol		1913–2010	26 March 1952	6 June 1952	PMR	abolished						
1948	XXXIX	48	Gheorghe Stoica			2 June 1952	30 November 1952	PMR	abolished						
1952	XL	(43)	Constantin Pîrvulescu		1895–1992	23 January 1953	5 March 1961	PMR	abolished						
1957	XLI	(43)	Constantin Pîrvulescu		1895–1992	23 January 1953	5 March 1961	PMR	abolished						
1961	XLII	(43)	Constantin Pîrvulescu		1895–1992	23 January 1953	5 March 1961	PMR	abolished						
1961	XLII	49	Ștefan Voitec		1900–1984	20 March 1961	28 March 1974	PMR/PCR	abolished						
1965	XLIII	49	Ștefan Voitec		1900–1984	20 March 1961	28 March 1974	PMR/PCR	abolished						
1969	XLIV	49	Ștefan Voitec		1900–1984	20 March 1961	28 March 1974	PMR/PCR	abolished						
1969	XLIV	50	Miron Constantinescu		1917–1974	28 March 1974	18 July 1974	PCR	abolished						
1969	XLIV	51	Nicolae Giosan		1921–1990	26 July 1974	12 December 1989	PCR	abolished						
1975	XLV	51	Nicolae Giosan		1921–1990	26 July 1974	12 December 1989	PCR	abolished						
1980	XLVI	51	Nicolae Giosan		1921–1990	26 July 1974	12 December 1989	PCR	abolished						
1985	XLVII	51	Nicolae Giosan		1921–1990	26 July 1974	12 December 1989	PCR	abolished						
1990	XLVIII	Assembly of Deputies (Note: Until 1992)							Senate						
1990	XLVIII	52	Marțian Dan		1935–2002	19 June 1990	16 October 1992	FSN	35	Alexandru Bârlădeanu		1911–1997	18 June 1990	16 October 1992	FSN
1992	XLIX	Chamber of Deputies							36	Oliviu Gherman		1930–2020	22 October 1992	22 November 1996	FDSN/PDSR
1992	XLIX	53	Adrian Năstase		1950–	28 October 1992	22 November 1996	FDSN/PDSR	36	Oliviu Gherman		1930–2020	22 October 1992	22 November 1996	FDSN/PDSR
1996	L	54	Ion Diaconescu		1917–2011	27 November 1996	30 November 2000	PNȚCD	37	Petre Roman		1946–	27 November 1996	22 December 1999	PD
1996	L	54	Ion Diaconescu		1917–2011	27 November 1996	30 November 2000	PNȚCD	38	Mircea Ionescu-Quintus		1917–2017	4 February 2000	30 November 2000	PNL
2000	LI	55	Valer Dorneanu		1944–	15 December 2000	30 November 2004	PDSR/PSD	39	Nicolae Văcăroiu		1943–	15 December 2000	14 October 2008	PDSR/PSD

==== 21st century ====
El. yr.	Leg. no.	LOWER HOUSE							UPPER HOUSE						
El. yr.	Leg. no.	#	Name	Portrait	Born-Died	Took office	Left office	Party	#	Name	Portrait	Born-Died	Took office	Left office	Party
2004	LII	Chamber of Deputies							Senate						
2004	LII	(53)	Adrian Năstase		1950–	19 December 2004	16 March 2006	PSD	39	Nicolae Văcăroiu		1943–	15 December 2000	14 October 2008	PDSR/PSD
2004	LII	56	Bogdan Olteanu		1971–	20 March 2006	13 December 2008	PNL	39	Nicolae Văcăroiu		1943–	15 December 2000	14 October 2008	PDSR/PSD
2004	LII	56	Bogdan Olteanu		1971–	20 March 2006	13 December 2008	PNL	—	Doru Ioan Tărăcilă (acting)		1951–	14 October 2008	28 October 2008	PSD
2004	LII	56	Bogdan Olteanu		1971–	20 March 2006	13 December 2008	PNL	40	Ilie Sârbu		1950–	28 October 2008	13 December 2009	PSD
2008	LIII	57	Roberta Anastase		1976–	19 December 2008	3 July 2012	PDL	41	Mircea Geoană		1958–	19 December 2009	23 November 2011	PSD
2008	LIII	57	Roberta Anastase		1976–	19 December 2008	3 July 2012	PDL	—	Petru Filip (acting)		1955–	23 November 2011	28 November 2011	PDL
2008	LIII	57	Roberta Anastase		1976–	19 December 2008	3 July 2012	PDL	43	Vasile Blaga		1956–	28 November 2011	3 July 2012	PDL
2008	LIII	58	Valeriu Zgonea		1967–	3 July 2012	20 December 2012	PSD	44	Crin Antonescu		1959–	3 July 2012	20 December 2012	PNL
2012	LIV	58	Valeriu Zgonea		1967–	20 December 2012	13 June 2016	PSD	44	Crin Antonescu		1959–	19 December 2012	4 March 2014	PNL
2012	LIV	58	Valeriu Zgonea		1967–	20 December 2012	13 June 2016	PSD	—	Cristian Dumitrescu (acting)		1955–	5 March 2014	10 March 2014	PSD
2012	LIV	58	Valeriu Zgonea		1967–	20 December 2012	13 June 2016	PSD	45	Călin Popescu-Tăriceanu		1952–	10 March 2014	21 December 2016	Ind./PLR/ALDE
2012	LIV	—	Florin Iordache (acting)		1960–	13 June 2016	September 2016	PSD	45	Călin Popescu-Tăriceanu		1952–	10 March 2014	21 December 2016	Ind./PLR/ALDE
2012	LIV	59	Florin Iordache		1960–	September 2016	21 December 2016	PSD	45	Călin Popescu-Tăriceanu		1952–	10 March 2014	21 December 2016	Ind./PLR/ALDE
2016	LV	60	Liviu Dragnea		1962–	21 December 2016	27 May 2019	PSD	45	Călin Popescu-Tăriceanu		1952–	21 December 2016	2 September 2019	ALDE
2016	LV	61	Marcel Ciolacu		1967–	29 May 2019	21 December 2020	PSD	45	Călin Popescu-Tăriceanu		1952–	21 December 2016	2 September 2019	ALDE
2016	LV	61	Marcel Ciolacu		1967–	29 May 2019	21 December 2020	PSD	—	Șerban Valeca (acting)		1956–2022	2 September 2019	10 September 2019	PSD
2016	LV	61	Marcel Ciolacu		1967–	29 May 2019	21 December 2020	PSD	46	Teodor Meleșcanu		1941–	10 September 2019	3 February 2020	Ind. with PSD support
2016	LV	61	Marcel Ciolacu		1967–	29 May 2019	21 December 2020	PSD	—	Titus Corlățean (acting)		1968–	3 February 2020	9 April 2020	PSD
2016	LV	61	Marcel Ciolacu		1967–	29 May 2019	21 December 2020	PSD	—	Robert Cazanciuc (acting)		1971–	9 April 2020	21 December 2020	PSD
2020	LVI	62	Ludovic Orban		1963–	22 December 2020	13 October 2021	PNL	47	Anca Dragu		1972–	21 December 2020	23 November 2021	USR PLUS (Note: PLUS member)/USR
2020	LVI	—	Florin Roman (acting)		1974–	18 October 2021	2 November 2021	PNL	47	Anca Dragu		1972–	21 December 2020	23 November 2021	USR PLUS/USR
2020	LVI	–	Sorin Grindeanu (acting)		1973–	2 November 2021	23 November 2021	PSD	47	Anca Dragu		1972–	21 December 2020	23 November 2021	USR PLUS/USR
2020	LVI	(61)	Marcel Ciolacu		1967–	23 November 2021	15 June 2023	PSD	48	Florin Cîțu		1972–	23 November 2021	29 June 2022	PNL
2020	LVI	(61)	Marcel Ciolacu		1967–	23 November 2021	15 June 2023	PSD	—	Alina Gorghiu (acting)		1978–	29 June 2022	13 June 2023	PNL
2020	LVI	—	Alfred Simonis (acting)		1985–	25 June 2023	2 September 2024	PSD	49	Nicolae Ciucă		1967–	13 June 2023	23 December 2024	PNL
2020	LVI	63	Daniel Suciu		1980–	2 September 2024	23 December 2024	PSD	49	Nicolae Ciucă		1967–	13 June 2023	23 December 2024	PNL
2024	LVII	64	Ciprian Șerban		1985–	23 December 2024	23 June 2025	PSD	50	Ilie Bolojan		1969–	23 December 2024	23 June 2025	PNL
2024	LVII	65	Sorin Grindeanu		1973–	24 June 2025	Incumbent	PSD	51	Mircea Abrudean		1984–	24 June 2025	Incumbent	PNL

== Functioning ==
Prior to the modifications of the Constitution in 2003, the two houses had identical attributes. A text of a law had to be approved by both houses. If the text differed, a special commission (comisie de mediere) was formed by deputies and senators, that "negotiated" between the two houses the form of the future law. The report of this commission had to be approved in a joint session of the Parliament. This French procedure proved to be extremely long and inefficient with respect to the expectations of the Romanians towards democracy.

After the 2003 referendum, a law still has to be approved by both houses, but in some matters one is "superior" to the other, being called "decision chamber" ("cameră decizională"). This eliminates the process of "negotiation" between the two houses, and keeps the Senate as the upper house and the Chamber as the lower house.

=== Committees ===
Committees of the Chamber of Deputies (15):
– The committee for legal affairs, appointments, discipline, immunities and validations;
– Committee on Budget, finance, banking and capital market;
– The commission for economy, industry and services;
– Committee on Agriculture, Forestry and Rural Development;
– The Committee on Foreign Affairs;
– Committee on public administration, the territory and environmental protection;
– The commission for defense, public order and national security;
– Commission for work, family and social protection;
– Committee for Education, Science, Youth and Sports;
– Committee on Public Health;
– Committee for culture, art and media information in the table;
– Commission on Human Rights, religious and minority;
– The Committee on Equal Opportunities;
– Commission for privatization and management of state assets;
– Committee on research abuses, corruption and petitions.

Committees of the Senate (14):
– Committee for Economic Policy, Reform, and Privatization;
– Committee for Budget, Finance, and, Banks, Committee for Industries and Services, Committee for Agriculture, Forestry, Food Industry and Specific Services;
– Committee for Human Rights, Cults and National Minorities Issues;
– Committee for Public Administration Territorial Planning and Ecological Balance;
– Committee for Labour and Social Protection, Committee for Health and Family;
– Committee for Education, Science, Youth, and Sport;
– Committee for Culture, Arts, Mass Information Means;
– Committee for Legal Matters, Discipline, and Immunities;
– Committee for Defense Public Order, and National Security;
– Committee for Foreign Policy;
– Committee for the Investigation of Abuses, Corrupt Practices, and for Petitions;
– Committee for Standing Orders;
– Committee for information technologies and communications;
– Committee on Equal Opportunities for Women and Men.

Joint committees :
Standing committees:
– The Committee on European Affairs;
– The former Committee for European Integration;
– The Joint Standing Committee of the Chamber of Deputies and the Senate for the exercise of parliamentary control over the activity of the Romanian Intelligence Service;
– The Joint Standing Committee of the Chamber of Deputies and the Senate for the exercise of parliamentary control over the activity of the Foreign Intelligence Service;
– The Parliamentary Committee for the control of the implementation of the Law no.42/1990 for honoring the martyr heroes and granting rights to their successors, to the persons wounded in, and to the fighters for the victory of the Revolution of December 1990;
– The Joint Standing Committee of the Chamber of Deputies and the Senate for the statute of the Senator and Deputy, and organizing and functioning of the joint sessions of the Chambers;
– The Joint Standing Committee of the Chamber of Deputies and the Senate for the relation with UNESCO.

Special committees:
– The Joint Standing Committee of the Chamber of Deputies and the Senate for the elaboration of the legislative proposal regarding the election of the Chamber of Deputies and the Senate, of the President of Romania, of the authorities of the public local administration, financing of the elections campaign, and the election of the members of the European Parliament;
– The Joint Special Standing Committee of the Chamber of Deputies and the Senate for the control of the budget execution of the Court of Accounts during the year 2003;
– The Joint Special Standing Committee of the Chamber of Deputies and the Senate for establishing the antenna times for the election of the Romanian Members of the European Parliament;
– The Joint Special Standing Committee of Parliament for the antenna times for the national referendum regarding the introduction of the uninominal election of the members of the Parliament of Romania.

Inquiry committees:
– The parliamentary inquiry committee for investigations and clarifying the status of the bank accounts of Nicolae Ceaușescu;
– The parliamentary inquiry committee for investigations and clarifying the activity of ICE Dunărea;
– The parliamentary inquiry committee for investigations regarding interception of communications;
– The parliamentary inquiry committee of the Chamber of Deputies and the Senate regarding the Bordei Park;
– The parliamentary inquiry committee for investigations and clarifying the spending way of the money obtained as a 2% quota from the privatization value, destined to the building of social housing, as established by the article 44, 2nd paragraph of the Law 10/2001 regarding the judiciary regime of the buildings abusively acquired by the state in the period 6 March 1945 – 22 December 1989, republished.

== Composition ==
=== 2024–2028 ===
Seats in the Senate of Romania
Party	Election seating		Lost	Won	Present seating	
Party	Seats	%	Lost	Won	Seats	%
Social Democratic Party	36	26.86%	0	0	36	26.86%
Alliance for the Union of Romanians	28	20.89%	0	0	28	20.89%
National Liberal Party	22	16.41%	0	0	22	16.41%
Save Romania Union	19	14.17%	0	0	19	14.17%
S.O.S. Romania	12	8.95%	11	0	1	0.74%
Party of Young People	7	5.22%	2	0	5	3.73%
Democratic Alliance of Hungarians in Romania	10	7.46%	0	0	10	7.46%
Independents	—	—	0	11	11	8.20%
Total	134	100	—		134	100

Seats in the Chamber of Deputies of Romania
Party	Election seating		Lost	Won	Present seating	
Party	Seats	%	Lost	Won	Seats	%
Social Democratic Party	86	26.06%	0	0	86	26.06%
Alliance for the Union of Romanians	63	19.09%	0	1	62	18.78%
National Liberal Party	49	14.84%	0	2	51	15.45%
Save Romania Union	40	12.12%	0	0	40	12.12%
S.O.S. Romania	28	8.48%	13	0	15	4.54%
Party of Young People	24	7.27%	10	0	14	4.24%
Democratic Alliance of Hungarians in Romania	22	6.66%	0	0	22	6.66%
Parties of ethnic minorities	18	5.45%	0	0	18	5.45%
Total	330	100	—		330	100

=== 2020–2024 ===
Seats in the Senate of Romania
Party	Election seating		Lost	Won	Present seating	
Party	Seats	%	Lost	Won	Seats	%
Social Democratic Party	47	34.55%	2	1	46	33.82%
National Liberal Party	41	30.14%	4	0	37	27.20%
Save Romania Union	25	18.38%	3	0	22	16.17%
Alliance for the Union of Romanians	14	10.29%	2	0	12	8.82%
Democratic Alliance of Hungarians in Romania	9	6.61%	0	0	9	6.61%
Force of the Right	—	—	0	3	3	2.20%
Social Liberal Humanist Party	—	—	0	1	1	0.73%
Romanian Nationhood Party	—	—	0	1	1	0.73%
Independents	—	—	2	3	5	3.67%
Total	136	100	—		136	100

Seats in the Chamber of Deputies of Romania
Party	Election seating		Lost	Won	Present seating	
Party	Seats	%	Lost	Won	Seats	%
Social Democratic Party	110	33.33%	7	1	104	31.51%
National Liberal Party	93	28.18%	16	3	80	24.24%
Save Romania Union (Note: Initially entered the Parliament as USR PLUS, then reverted its name officially to USR after their latest party congress which took place in early October 2021.)	55	16.66%	11	0	44	13.33%
Alliance for the Union of Romanians	33	10.00%	10	1	24	7.27%
Democratic Alliance of Hungarians in Romania	21	6.36%	1	0	20	6.06%
Parties of ethnic minorities	18	5.45%	1	1	18	5.45%
Force of the Right	—	—	1	17	16	4.84%
Renewing Romania's European Project	—	—	0	10	10	3.03%
Social Liberal Humanist Party	—	—	0	4	4	1.21%
Romanian Nationhood Party	—	—	0	4	4	1.21%
The Right Alternative	—	—	0	3	3	0.90%
Alliance for the Homeland	—	—	0	1	1	0.30%
Association of Italians of Romania	—	—	0	1	1	0.30%
Independents	—	—	13	14	1	0.30%
Total	330	100	—		330	100

=== 2016–2020 ===
Seats in the Senate of Romania
Party	Election seating		Lost	Won	End seating	
Party	Seats	%	Lost	Won	Seats	%
Social Democratic Party	67	49.26%	10	2	59	43.38%
National Liberal Party	30	22.05%	4	0	26	19.11%
Save Romania Union	13	9.55%	0	0	13	9.55%
Democratic Alliance of Hungarians in Romania	9	6.61%	1	1	9	6.61%
Alliance of Liberals and Democrats	9	6.61%	5	3	7	5.14%
People's Movement Party	8	5.88%	4	1	5	3.67%
Humanist Power Party	—	—	0	2	2	1.47%
Independents	—	—	0	15	15	11.02%
Total	136	100	—		136	100

Seats in the Chamber of Deputies of Romania
Party	Election seating		Lost	Won	End seating	
Party	Seats	%	Lost	Won	Seats	%
Social Democratic Party	154	46.8%	65	28	117	35.56%
National Liberal Party	69	20.97%	6	3	66	20.06%
Save Romania Union	30	9.11%	11	6	25	7.59%
Democratic Alliance of Hungarians in Romania	21	6.38%	1	0	20	6.07%
Alliance of Liberals and Democrats	20	6.07%	10	4	14	4.26%
People's Movement Party	18	5.47%	9	6	15	4.55%
Parties of ethnic minorities	17	5.17%	0	0	17	5.17%
PRO Romania	—	—	0	21	21	6.38%
Humanist Power Party	—	—	0	7	7	2.12%
Independents	—	—	11	38	27	10.94%
Total	329	100	—		329	100

=== 2008–2012 ===
Seats in the Senate of Romania, 6th legislature
Party	Election seating		Lost	Won	Present seating	
Party	Seats	%	Lost	Won	Seats	%
Democratic Liberal Party	51	37.22%	19	2	35	25.54%
Social Democratic Party	49	35.76%	15	3	40	29.19%
National Liberal Party	28	20.43%	16	4	27	19.70%
Democratic Union of Hungarians in Romania	9	6.57%	2	0	7	5.10%
National Union for the Progress of Romania	—	—	4	12	12	8.75%
Independents	—	—		2	2	1.45%
Vacant seats					14	—
Total	137	100	—		137	100

Seats in the Chamber of Deputies of Romania
Parliamentary Group	Election seating		Lost	Won	Present	
Parliamentary Group	Seats	%	Lost	Won	Seats	%
Democratic Liberal Party	115	34.43%	29	12	106	31.73%
Social Democratic Party	114	34.13%	29	2	91	27.24%
National Liberal Party	65	19.46%	21	6	56	16.76%
Democratic Union of Hungarians in Romania	22	6.58%	2	0	20	5.98%
Ethnic minorities parties	18	5.39%	2	0	16	4.79%
National Union for the Progress of Romania	—	—	16	16	12	3.59%
Independents					8	2.39%
Vacant seats					25	—
Total	334	100	—		334	100

=== 2004–2008 ===
The figures in the table below denote only the seats in the Chamber of Deputies:

Party	% of seats	Seats
Social Democratic Party	32.31	105
Democratic Liberal Party (Note: The Democratic Liberal Party (PDL) initially entered the parliament as the Democratic Party (PD) and subsequently enlarged itself with the absorption of the PNL splinter group called PLD, or Liberal Democratic Party, thereby renaming itself PDL.)	20.62	67
National Liberal Party	18.15	59
Greater Romania Party (Note: This was the last legislature in which the Greater Romania Party (PRM) entered the parliament.)	6.77	22
Democratic Alliance of Hungarians in Romania	6.77	22
Conservative Party	5.85	19
Parties of ethnic minorities	5.54	18
Independents	4.00	13
Total	100	325

=== 2000–2004 ===
The figures in the table below denote only the seats in the Chamber of Deputies:

Party	% of seats	Seats
Social Democratic Party	44.92	155
Greater Romania Party	24.34	84
Democratic Party	8.98	31
National Liberal Party	8.69	30
Democratic Alliance of Hungarians in Romania	7.82	27
Parties of ethnic minorities	5.21	18
Total	100	345

=== 1996–2000 ===
The figures in the table below denote only the seats in the Chamber of Deputies:

Party	% of seats	Seats
Romanian Democratic Convention	35.56	122
Party of Social Democracy in Romania	26.53	91
Social Democratic Union (Note: The Social Democratic Union (USD) was formed by the Democratic Party (PD) and the Romanian Social Democratic Party (PSDR) as an alternative to the Party of Social Democracy in Romania (PDSR; now PSD).)	15.45	53
Democratic Alliance of Hungarians in Romania	7.28	25
Greater Romania Party	5.53	19
Romanian National Unity Party (Note: This was the last legislature in which the Romanian National Unity Party (PUNR) entered the parliament.)	5.24	18
Parties of ethnic minorities	4.37	15
Total	100	343

=== 1992–1996 ===
The figures in the table below denote only the seats in the Chamber of Deputies:

Party	% of seats	Seats
Democratic National Salvation Front	34.31	117
Romanian Democratic Convention	24.04	82
National Salvation Front	12.60	43
Romanian National Unity Party	8.79	30
Democratic Alliance of Hungarians in Romania	7.91	27
Greater Romania Party	4.69	16
Socialist Party of Labour (Note: This was the first and only legislature in which the Socialist Party of Labour (PSM) entered the parliament.)	3.81	13
Parties of ethnic minorities	3.81	13
Total	100	341

=== 1990–1992 ===
The figures in the table below denote only the seats in the Chamber of Deputies:

Party	% of seats	Seats
National Salvation Front	66.31	263
Democratic Alliance of Hungarians in Romania	7.23	29
National Liberal Party	6.41	29
Ecological Movement of Romania (Note: This was the first and only legislature in which the Ecological Movement of Romania (MER) entered the parliament.)	2.62	12
Christian Democratic National Peasants' Party	2.56	12
Others (including independents)	13.88	39
Parties of ethnic minorities	0.99	11
Total	100	396
