= List of Romanian politicians =

A list of Romanian politicians.

== A ==
- Slavoliub Adnagi
- Gheorghe Alexandrescu
- Nicolae Alexandri
- Radu F. Alexandru
- Gheorghe Alexianu
- Dumitru Alimănișteanu
- Elena Alistar
- Andrei Volosevici
- Roberta Anastase
- Petre Andrei
- Ștefan Andrei
- Constantin Anton
- Crin Antonescu
- Ion Antonescu
- Mihai Antonescu
- Sorin Apostu
- Constantin Argetoianu
- Anton I. Arion
- Constantin C. Arion
- Costache Aristia
- Apostol Arsache
- Teodor Atanasiu

== B ==
- Vincențiu Babeș
- Victor Babiuc
- Anton Bacalbașa
- Viorel Badea
- Gaston Bienvenu Mboumba Bakabana
- Radu Bălan
- Alexandru Baltaga
- John Ion Banu Muscel
- Coriolan Băran
- Eugen Barbu
- Sulfina Barbu
- Sava Barcianu-Popovici
- Alexandru Bârlădeanu
- Constantin Barozzi
- Ion Bazac
- Iulian Bădescu
- Nicolae Bălcescu
- Emanoil Băleanu
- Ion Bănescu
- Dan Barna
- Simion Bărnuțiu
- Petru Bașa
- Traian Băsescu
- George Becali
- Eugen Bejinariu
- Barbu Bellu
- Octavian Bellu
- Radu Berceanu
- Dimitrie I. Berindei
- Ioan G. Bibicescu
- Ana Birchall
- Vasile Blaga
- Nicolae Blaremberg
- Anca Boagiu
- Emil Boc
- Marilena Bocu
- Sever Bocu
- Marius Bodea
- Sebastian Bodu
- Constantin Boerescu
- Vasile Boerescu
- Alexandru Bogdan-Pitești
- Vladimir Bogos
- Ioan Boieriu
- Matei Boilă
- Dimitrie Bolintineanu
- Ilie Bolojan
- László Borbély
- Valeriu Bordei
- Constantin Bosianu
- Nicolae Bosie-Codreanu
- Constantin Boșcodeală
- Ioan Gh. Botez
- Ioan Botiș
- Ștefan Botnarciuc
- Martin Bottesch
- Cristian Boureanu
- Cornel Brahaș
- Valeriu Braniște
- Ion Constantin Brătianu
- Constantin C. Brătianu
- Dumitru Brătianu
- Vintilă Brătianu
- Caius Brediceanu
- Coriolan Brediceanu
- Eugen Brote
- Silviu Brucan
- Faust Brădescu
- Constantin I.C. Brătianu
- Gheorghe I. Brătianu
- Ion I.C. Brătianu
- Radu Budișteanu
- Simion Bughici
- Avram Bunaciu
- Gheorghe Buruiană
- Teodor Bârcă
- Teodosie Bârcă
- Gheorghe Băicoianu
- Ion Bălăceanu

== C ==
- Nicolae Calimachi-Catargiu
- Mircea Cancicov
- Alexandru Cantacuzino (legionnaire)
- Alexandru Cantacuzino (minister)
- Gheorghe Grigore Cantacuzino
- Ion C. Cantacuzino
- Mihail Cantacuzino
- Mihail G. Cantacuzino
- Gheorghe Cantacuzino-Grănicerul
- George P. Cantilli
- Anton Caraiman
- Dimitrie Cariagdi
- Dan Cârlan
- Anton Carp
- Petre P. Carp
- Barbu Catargiu
- Lascăr Catargiu
- Emanoil Catelly
- Grigorie Cazacliu
- Ion Cazacliu
- Vladimir Cazacliu
- Petru Cazacu
- Ștefan Cazimir
- Victor Cădere
- Dimitrie Cărăuș
- Radu Câmpeanu
- Dan Nicolae Gheorghe Ceaușescu
- Elena Ceaușescu
- Nicolae Ceaușescu
- Nicu Ceaușescu
- Nicolae Cekerul Cuș
- Sergiu Celac
- Vasile Cepoi
- Eugen Chebac
- Mircea Chelaru
- Vladimir Chiorescu
- Afanasie Chiriac
- Daniel Chițoiu
- Tudor Chiuariu
- Ion Ciocan
- Silvia Ciornei
- Adrian Cioroianu
- Dimitrie N. Ciotori
- Gheorghe Ciuhandu
- Mugur Ciuvică
- Constantin Coandă
- Pavel Cocârlă
- Corneliu Zelea Codreanu
- Ion Codreanu
- Codrin Ștefănescu
- Mihail Coiciu
- Dimitrie Comșa
- Daniel Constantin
- Constantin Al. (Atta) Constantinescu
- Alexandru C. Constantinescu
- Emil Constantinescu
- Nicu Constantinescu
- Petre Constantinescu-Iași
- Grigore Constantinescu-Monteoru
- George Copos
- Dimitrie Cornea
- Cornel Ceuca
- Nicolae Corodeanu
- Partenie Cosma
- Gheorghe Costaforu
- Teodor D. Costescu
- Ioan E. Costinescu
- Dimitrie Cozadini
- Nichifor Crainic
- Ion Creangă
- Corina Crețu
- Alexandru Crețescu
- Gabriela Crețu
- Victor Cristea
- Vladimir Cristi
- Gheorghe Cuciureanu
- Dănuț Culețu
- Sergiu Cunescu
- Ovidiu Sorin Cupșa
- Sabin Cutaș
- Alexandru C. Cuza
- Alexandru Ioan Cuza
- Ion Câmpineanu
- Florentin Cârpanu

== D ==
- Mihai Darie
- Cristian David
- Gavril Dejeu
- Anghel Demetriescu
- Gheorghe Derussi
- Mircea Diaconu
- Ene Dinga
- Constantin G. Dissescu
- Alexandru G. Djuvara
- Gheorghe Dobre
- Gheorghe Docan
- Ioan Docan
- Ștefan Augustin Doinaș
- Panait Donici
- Dimitrie Dragomir
- Silviu Dragomir
- Dimitrie Dron
- Mircea Druc
- Dumitru Drăghicescu
- Ion Gheorghe Duca
- Helmut Duckadam
- Felix Dudchievicz
- Corina Dumitrescu
- Nicolae Dumitru

== E ==
- Mayer Ebner
- Péter Eckstein-Kovács
- Eduard Eisenburger
- Boris Epure
- Manolache Costache Epureanu
- Constantin Eraclide
- Pantelimon Erhan
- Constantin Esărescu

== F ==
- Gheorghe Falcă
- Mihail Fărcășanu
- Wilhelm Filderman
- Petru Filip
- Avram Filipaș
- Grigore N. Filipescu
- Nicolae Filipescu
- Ioan C. Filitti
- Ion I. Fințescu
- Nicolae Fleva
- Iancu Flondor
- Nicu Flondor
- Alexandru Florescu
- Gheorghe Flutur
- Ștefan Foriș
- Richard Franasovici
- Emilian Valentin Frâncu
- Sorin Frunzăverde
- Gheorghe Fulga

== G ==
- Grigore Gafencu
- Vasile Gafencu
- Simeon Galițchi
- Camelia Gavrilă
- Andrei Găină
- Mircea Geoană
- Costin Georgescu
- Vasile Ghenzul
- Vasile Gheorghian
- Gheorghe Gheorghiu-Dej
- Nicolae Gherassi
- Onisifor Ghibu
- Dimitrie Ghica
- Ioan Grigore Ghica
- Ion Ghica
- Dimitrie Ghica-Comănești
- Eugen Ghica-Comănești
- Nicolae Ghica-Comănești
- Radu Ghidău
- Gheorghe Ghimpu
- Dimitrie Gianni
- Octavian Goga
- Vasile Goldiș
- Alexandru G. Golescu
- Nicolae Golescu
- Ștefan Gonata
- Daniil Graur
- Valeriu Graur
- Ovidiu Grecea
- Dimitrie Greceanu
- Gheorghe Grigorovici
- Alexandru Groapă
- Cornel Grofșorean
- Petru Groza
- Grigore Grădișteanu
- Ion C. Grădișteanu
- Petru Grădișteanu
- Octavian Guțu
- Slavomir Gvozdenovici

== H ==
- Crin Halaicu
- Pan Halippa
- Spiru Haret
- Bogdan Petriceicu Hasdeu
- Puiu Hașotti
- Ion Heliade-Rădulescu
- Nicolae Hendea
- Alexandru Hodoș
- Iosif Hodoș
- Constantin Hurmuzachi
- Eudoxiu Hurmuzachi
- Nicolae Hurmuzaki
- Alexandru Hurmuzaki

== I ==
- Gheorghe Ialomițianu
- Victor Iamandi
- Constantin Iancu
- Ioan Ianov
- Vasile Iașinschi
- Ion Ignatiuc
- Ilie Ilașcu
- Ion Iliescu
- Ion Inculeț
- Klaus Iohannis
- Ion Andronescu
- Teofil Ioncu
- Constantin Dudu Ionescu
- Nicolae Ionescu (publicist)
- Take Ionescu
- Mircea Ionescu-Quintus
- Nicolae Iorga
- Dimitrie Iov
- Diana Iovanovici Șoșoacă
- Nicolae Istrati
- Ilariu Isvoranu

== K ==
- Mihail Kogălniceanu
- Constantin A. Kretzulescu

== L ==
- Alexandru N. Lahovari
- Iacob N. Lahovari
- Ion N. Lahovari
- Ion Lahovary
- Stephen Bartlett Lakeman
- Michel Landau
- Leonida Lari
- August Treboniu Laurian
- Aurel Lazăr
- Ilie Lazăr
- Vasile Lașcu
- Viorel Lis
- Emil Lobonțiu
- Vasile Luca

== M ==
- Ion Macovei
- George Macovescu
- Virgil Madgearu
- Titu Maiorescu
- Dumitru Man
- Gheorghe Manu
- Ioan Mang
- Cassiu Maniu
- Ioan Maniu
- Iuliu Maniu
- Mihail Manoilescu
- Nicolae Manolescu
- Mioara Mantale
- Ionel Manțog
- Ioan Manu
- Șmil Marcovici
- Gheorghe Mare
- Alexandru Marghiloman
- Béla Markó
- Dimitrie Mârza
- Gheorghe Gh. Mârzescu
- Petre Mavrogheni
- Radu Mazăre
- Dumitru Mazilu
- Nicolae Mămăligă
- Constantin Meissner
- Teodor Meleșcanu
- Istrate Micescu
- Mircea Miclea
- Dimitrie Scarlat Miclescu
- Mihai Bălășescu
- Mihai David
- Radu Mihai
- Ion Mihalache
- Eugen Mihăescu
- Marian Petre Miluț
- Mihail Minciună
- Ion Mincu
- Gheorghe Mironescu
- Basile M. Missir
- Nicolae Mișu
- Ion Mitilineu
- Miron Mitrea
- Alexandru Mocioni
- Andrei Mocioni
- Ioan Mocsony-Stârcea
- Valeriu Moldovan
- Alexandru Moraru
- Anatolie Moraru
- George G. Moronescu
- Vasile G. Morțun
- Ion I. Moța
- Ovidiu Ioan Muntean
- Marian Munteanu
- Iacob Mureșianu
- Eftimie Murgu
- Răzvan Mustea-Șerban

== N ==
- Grigore Nandriș
- Gheorghe Năstas
- Adrian Năstase
- Ovidiu Natea
- Alexandru Nazare
- Teodor Neaga
- Corneliu Neagoe
- Robert Sorin Negoiță
- Constantin Negruzzi
- Dimitrie S. Nenițescu
- Marius Nicoară
- Diodor Nicoară
- Nicolae Nemirschi
- Nicolae Penescu
- Sergiu Nicolaescu
- Pompiliu Nicolau
- Grigore Niculescu-Buzești
- Oana Niculescu-Mizil
- Constantin Niță
- Constantin Năsturel-Herescu

== O ==
- Alexandru Odobescu
- Bogdan Olteanu
- Romeo Olteanu
- Constantin P. Olănescu
- Remus Opreanu
- Marian Oprișan
- Ioan Nicolae Opriș
- Alexandru Orăscu
- Leonard Orban
- Ludovic Orban
- Simion Oros
- Ioan Ossian

== P ==
- Nicușor Păduraru
- Ionel Palăr
- George D. Pallade
- Varujan Pambuccian
- Ioan Pangal
- Ermil A. Pangrati
- Aurelian Pană
- Victor Papacostea
- Alexandru Papadopol-Calimah
- Constantin Pârvulescu
- Grigore Păucescu
- Ana Pauker
- Ion Pelivan
- Ioan Gr. Periețeanu
- Petre Logadi
- Constantin Titel Petrescu
- Nicolae Petrescu-Comnen
- Alexandru Petrino
- Ion Petrovici
- Mihail Pherekyde
- Cornel Pieptea
- Gherman Pântea
- Rovana Plumb
- Gheorghe Pogea
- Vasile Pogor
- Victor Ponta
- Gheorghe Pop de Băsești
- Ștefan Cicio Pop
- Teofil Pop
- Ionuț Popa (politician)
- Cristian Popescu Piedone
- Dan Ioan Popescu
- Ionuț Popescu
- Irinel Popescu
- Nicolae Vedea Popescu
- Aurel Popovici
- Dorimedont Popovici
- Radu Portocală (politician)
- Emanoil Porumbaru
- Cristian Poteraș
- Cristian Preda
- Cătălin Predoiu
- Grigore Preoteasa
- Dragoș Protopopescu
- Doru Pruteanu
- Ion Păscăluță
- Paula Pirvanescu

== R ==
- Nicolae Gr. Racoviță
- Alexandru G. Radovici
- Mihai Ralea
- Alexandru Rațiu
- Aurel Rădulescu
- Augustin Rațiu
- Ion Rațiu
- Remus Kofler
- Ladislau Ritli
- Constantin Rolla
- Alexandru Roman
- Petre Roman
- Valter Roman
- Visarion Roman
- Mihail Romniceanu
- Constantin A. Rosetti
- Radu R. Rosetti
- Theodor Rosetti
- Nicolae Rosetti-Bălănescu
- Ion Rotaru
- Ioan Rus
- Gheorghe Ruset Roznovanu
- Lothar Rădăceanu

== S ==
- Nicolae Sacară
- Mihail Sadoveanu
- Iuliu Șamșudan
- Aureliu Emil Săndulescu
- Constantin Sărățeanu
- Ilie Sârbu
- Petre Sălcudeanu
- Stan Săraru
- Bucur Șchiopu
- Carol Schreter
- Maria Schutz
- George Scripcaru
- Leon Sculy Logothetides
- Dumitru Sechelariu
- Gheorghe Seculici
- Ștefan Șendrea
- Codruţ Şereş
- Timofei Silistaru
- Horia Sima
- George Simion
- Elefterie Sinicliu
- Victor Slăvescu
- Nichita P. Smochină
- Constantin Sofroni
- Antonie Solomon
- Alexandru Șoltoianu
- Ulm Spineanu
- Viorel Stanca
- Gheorghe Bunea Stancu
- Victor Atanasie Stănculescu
- Rodica Stănoiu
- Romeo Stavarache
- Toma Stelian
- Constantin Stere
- Gheorghe Stere
- George Sterian
- Adolphe Stern
- Alexandru B. Știrbei
- George Barbu Știrbei
- Barbu A. Știrbey
- Alecsandru Știucă
- Alex Mihai Stoenescu
- Vasile Stoica
- Constantin I. Stoicescu
- Anastase Stolojan
- Theodor Stolojan
- Benno Straucher
- Vasile Stroescu
- Ioan Străjescu
- Dimitrie A. Sturdza
- Mihail R. Sturdza
- Vasile Sturdza
- Dimitrie C. Sturdza-Scheianu
- Mircea V. Stănescu
- Rodica Stănoiu
- Eugeniu Stătescu
- Aurel Suciu
- Christodul J. Suliotis
- Nicolae Suțu
- Jenő Szász
- Lörincz Széll
- Lavinia Șandru
- Codruț Șereș
- Gheorghe Ștefan (politician)
- Corneliu Șumuleanu

== T ==
- Gemil Tahsin
- Ioan Taloș
- Claudiu Târziu
- Octavian C. Tăslăuanu
- Gheorghe Tătărăscu
- Gheorghe Tașcă
- Alexandru Teriachiu
- Răzvan Theodorescu
- Alin Tișe
- Nicolae Titulescu
- Eugen Tomac
- Mihai Toti
- Grigore Trancu-Iași
- Teo Trandafir
- Grigore Triandafil
- Valerian Trifa
- Tudor Ionescu
- Corneliu Vadim Tudor
- Alexandru Raj Tunaru
- Cătălin Septimiu Țurcaș
- Grigore Turcuman
- Adrian Turicu
- Petre Țuțea
- Edmond Tălmăcean
- Gabriel Țepelea
- Alexandru Tzigara-Samurcaș

== U ==
- Laurențiu Ulici
- Teodor Uncu
- Mihai Ungheanu
- Mihai Răzvan Ungureanu
- Traian Ungureanu
- Ernest Urdăreanu
- Alexandru Usatiuc-Bulgar

== V ==
- Alexandru Vaida-Voevod
- Darius Bogdan Vâlcov
- Valerian Vreme
- Marian Vanghelie
- Alexandru Vericeanu
- Dimitrie P. Vioreanu
- Virgil Ioan Mănescu
- Constantin Vișoianu
- Andrei Vizanti
- Mihail Vlădescu
- Dan Voiculescu
- Nicolae Voinov
- Ștefan Voitec
- Varujan Vosganian
- Iulian Vrăbiescu
- Mircea Vulcănescu
- Ion Văluță

== W ==
- Alexandru Wassilko de Serecki
- Eric Winterhalder

== X ==
- Nicolae Xenopol

== Z ==
- Dinu Zamfirescu
- Ștefan Zăvoianu
- Vitalie Zubac
