= Order of Carol I =

Honour of the Kingdom of Romania

Order of Carol I Ordinul Carol I
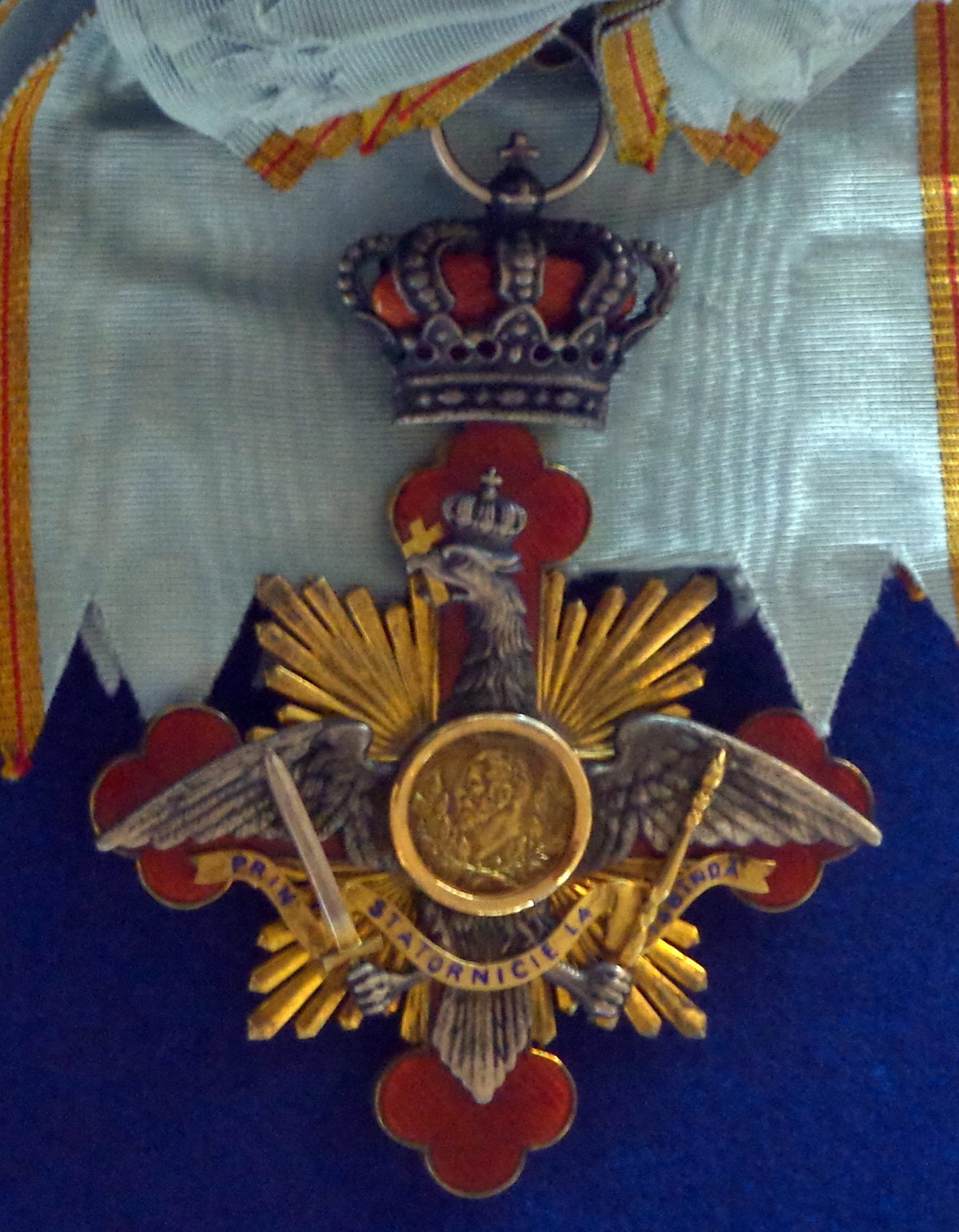
- Badge and sash of the order

Awarded by the King of Romania
- Type: Dynastic Order
- Royal house: House of Romania
- Religious affiliation: Romanian Orthodox
- Ribbon: Pale blue with gold edges bearing a narrow red stripe
- Motto: PRIN STATORNICIE LA IZBÂNDĂ ("To Victory Through Steadiness")
- Awarded for: Conspicuous and special merit
- Status: Currently constituted
- Grades: Grand Cross with Collar; Grand Cross; Grand Officer; Commander

Precedence
- Next (higher): Order of Michael the Brave
- Next (lower): Order of the star of Romania (formerly) Order of the Crown
- Ribbon of the order

The Order of Carol I (Romanian: Ordinul Carol I) was the highest ranking of the Romanian honours of the Kingdom of Romania until the founding of the Order of Michael the Brave in 1916 by King Ferdinand I of Romania. It was instituted on 10 May 1906 by King Carol I to celebrate the Ruby Jubilee of 40 years of his reign.

During its time as a national order, it was widely used to reward members of the Romanian royal family, Romanian Prime Ministers, Romanian politicians, foreign monarchs and heads of state, selected consorts and heirs, and other people thought to be worthy of receiving the order by the King of Romania.

It is currently a dynastic order of the former Romanian royal family. It is the highest-ranking award among all the decorations of the Romanian Royal House and is administered by its head. There are currently no foreign knights or dames of the order, except for members of the Romanian royal family.

== Classes ==
The order has only the superior classes, each of them with limited numbers:

- Grand Cross with Collar (limited to 10)
- Grand Cross (limited to 20)
- Grand Officer (limited to 30)
- Commander (limited to 40)

Holders of the order, regardless of degree, call themselves Knight of the Order of Carol I.

== Insignia ==
=== Collar ===
The Collar is in gold and consists of 8 links of the emblems of the Danubian Principalities of the Principality of Wallachia, Principality of Moldavia, Principality of Oltenia and Principality of Dobruja, 4 emblems on either side of the collar with 2 of the emblems of the House of Hohenzollern between each two Principalities; between each emblem is the monogram of King Carol I. At the back of the collar is the lock which is an eagle with open wings which suspends in half to wear. At the front of the collar is the Steel Crown of Romania from which the badge of the order hangs.

=== Badge ===
- The Badge is the Romanian Eagle on top of a square Gold sunray on top of a Red Maltese cross. The Eagle wears the Crown of Romania, holds the Orthodox cross in its beak, holds the Sword of King Carol I in its left claw, holds the Royal Mantle in its right claw and supports the ribbon inscribed "PRIN STATORNICIE LA IZBÂNDĂ" by both its claws whilst on its chest is a small Gold effigy of King Carol I.

On the obverse is the Red Maltese cross on top of the Gold sunray, in the middle of the Maltese Cross is a small Gold monogram of King Carol I.

- The Badge is featured on: The Collar, The Sash, The Medal and The Necklet.

=== Stars ===
There are two types of stars of the order: 1st which is for the Grand Cross with Collar/Grand Cross and the 2nd which is for the Grand Officer; both are to worn on the left stomach.

- The 1st Star is in Gold which is 8-pointed, set in sunray's and is similar in shape of the Swedish Royal Order of the Seraphim; the Eagle which is on the Badge is on top of the star and set in Silver.
- The 2nd Star is also in Gold and also in sunray's, it is set in a Rhombus shape and is similar in shape of the Dutch Order of the Crown; the Eagle which is on the Badge is on top of the star and set in Gold.

=== Sash ===
The Sash is pale Blue with Gold edges bearing a narrow Red stripe; at the bottom of the sash is a bow which joins both sides together and where the badge hangs from; It is worn from the right shoulder.

== Recipients ==
=== Grand Cross with Collar ===
(Romania) Romanian royal family

- King Carol I of Romania
- Queen Elisabeth of Romania
- King Ferdinand I of Romania
- Queen Marie of Romania
- King Carol II of Romania
- Prince Nicholas of Romania
- King Michael I of Romania
- Margareta, Custodian of the Romanian Crown

Romania

- Alexandru Averescu, 24th, 27th and 31st Prime Minister of Romania
- Ion C. Brătianu
- Petre P. Carp
- Gheorghe Grigore Cantacuzino, 20th & 23rd Prime Minister of Romania
- Nicolae Iorga, 34th Prime Minister of Romania
- Titu Maiorescu
- Gheorghe Manu, 17th Prime Minister of Romania
- Patriarch Miron of Romania, 38th Prime Minister of Romania and 7th Patriarch of All Romania
- Mihail Pherekyde
- Constantin Prezan, 28th and 25th Chief of the Romanian General Staff
- Dimitrie Sturdza
- Gheorghe Tătărescu, 36th and 42nd Prime Minister of Romania
- Nicolae Titulescu
- Alexandru Vaida-Voevod, 28th, 35th and 37th Prime Minister of Romania

Foreign

- (Albanian Kingdom (1928–1939)) Albanian Royal Family: Former King Zog I of Albania
- : Archduke Franz Ferdinand of Austria
- : Franz Joseph I of Austria
- (Grand Duchy of Baden) : Frederick I, Grand Duke of Baden
- (Grand Duchy of Baden) : Frederick II, Grand Duke of Baden
- Kingdom of Bavaria: Ludwig III of Bavaria
- Kingdom of Belgium: Albert I of Belgium
- Kingdom of Belgium: Leopold II of Belgium
- Kingdom of Bulgaria: King Boris III of the Bulgarians
- Kingdom of Bulgaria: Ferdinand I of Bulgaria
- Independent State of Croatia: Ante Pavelić, Head of State (7th July 1942)
- Czechoslovakia: Edvard Beneš, 2nd President of Czechoslovakia
- Czechoslovakia: Tomáš Garrigue Masaryk, 1st President of Czechoslovakia
- Kingdom of Denmark: Christian X of Denmark
- France: Armand Fallières
- France: Albert François Lebrun, 15th President of France
- France: Raymond Poincaré
- (German Empire) German Imperial and Royal Family: Former Emperor Wilhelm II of Germany
- (German Empire) German Imperial and Royal Family: Wilhelm, German Crown Prince
- Kingdom of Greece: King Constantine I of Greece
- Kingdom of Greece: George I of Greece
- Kingdom of Greece: King George II of Greece
- Kingdom of Greece: King Paul I of Greece
- William, Prince of Hohenzollern
- Kingdom of Italy: Victor Emmanuel III of Italy
- Kingdom of Italy: Prince Aimone, Duke of Aosta
- (Grand Duchy of Mecklenburg-Schwerin) Duke John Albert of Mecklenburg
- (Kingdom of Montenegro) Nicholas I of Montenegro
- Netherlands: Queen Wilhelmina of the Netherlands
- Norway: King Haakon VII of Norway
- Ottoman Imperial Family: Former Emperor Abdul Hamid II of the Ottoman Empire, 33rd Ottoman Caliph
- (Ottoman Empire) Ottoman Imperial Family: Şehzade Yusuf Izzeddin
- Poland: Ignacy Mościcki
- Poland: Józef Piłsudski, Chief of State of Poland
- Portugal: Carlos I of Portugal
- (Russian Empire) Russian Imperial Family: Former Emperor Nicholas II of Russia
- Kingdom of Spain: Alfonso XIII of Spain
- Sweden: Gustaf V
- Sweden: Gustaf VI Adolf
- United Kingdom: Colin Robert Ballard, Brigadier of the British Army
- United Kingdom: Edward VII
- United Kingdom: George V
- United Kingdom: Edward VIII
- United Kingdom: George VI
- Kingdom of Yugoslavia: King Alexander I of Yugoslavia
- Kingdom of Yugoslavia: Peter II of Yugoslavia

=== Grand Cross ===
(Romania) Romanian royal family

- Queen Mother Helen of Romania
- Queen Anne of Romania
- Prince Radu of Romania

Romania

- Constantin Angelescu
- Petre S. Aurelian
- Constantin Coandă
- Constantin Dissescu
- Nicolae Haralambie
- Take Ionescu
- Ioan Kalinderu
- Iuliu Maniu
- Gheorghe Mironescu
- Theodor Rosetti, 16th Prime Minister of Romania
- Anghel Saligny
- Fyodor Tolbukhin
- Artur Văitoianu

Foreign

- Belgium: Queen Elisabeth, Queen Grandmother of Belgium
- Belgium: Former King Leopold III of Belgium
- Germany
  - (German Empire) German Imperial and Royal Family: Empress Augusta Victoria, Former Empress Consort of Germany
  - (German Empire) German Imperial and Royal Family: Prince Eitel Friedrich of Prussia
    - (Grand Duchy of Mecklenburg-Strelitz) Grand Ducal Family of Mecklenburg-Strelitz: Prince Georg Alexander, Hereditary Grand Duke of Mecklenburg-Strelitz
- Kingdom of Greece: Queen Sophia, Queen Mother of Greece
- Greek Royal Family: Queen Frederica, Queen Mother of Greece
- Friedrich Wilhelm Prinz von Hohenzollern
- (Kingdom of Italy) Italian Royal Family: Former King Umberto II of Italy
- Empire of Japan: Prince Kuni Kuniyoshi
- Kingdom of Portugal: Manuel II of Portugal
- (Russian Empire) Russian Imperial Family: Empress Alexandra Feodorovna, The Former Empress Consort of Russia
- Sweden: Prince Wilhelm, Duke of Södermanland
- United Kingdom: Prince Arthur of Connaught
- Kingdom of Yugoslavia: Prince Arsen of Yugoslavia
- Kingdom of Yugoslavia: Nikola Pašić, Prime Minister of Serbia and Yugoslavia

=== Grand Officer ===
(Romania) Romanian royal family

- Princess Elisabeth of Romania
- Queen Maria, Queen Mother of Yugoslavia
- Princess Ileana of Romania
- Princess Elena of Romania

Romania

- Constantin C. Arion, 50th Minister of Foreign Affairs of Romania
- Emil Costinescu
- Nicolae Gane
- Spiru Haret
- Gheorghe I. Lahovary
- Iacob Lahovary
- Ioan Lahovary
- Alexandru Marghiloman
- Constantin Olănescu
- Petru Poni
- General Nicolae Samsonovici, 20th Chief of the Romanian General Staff

=== Commander ===
Romania

- Alecu Beldiman
- Constantin Cantacuzino-Pașcanu
- Alexandru C. Constantinescu
- Nicolae Filipescu
- Grigore I. Ghica
- Dimitrie I. Ghika
- Constantin Hârjeu
- Vasile Morțun
- Mihail Orleanu
- Ermil Pangrati
- Alexandru Plagino
- Grigore Tocilescu
- Scarlat Vârnav
- Clive Alderton

== See also ==
- Romanian Royal Family
- Decorations of the Romanian Royal House
