= President of the Chamber of Deputies of Romania =

Position in Romania's lower house of Parliament

- Coat of arms of the Chamber of Deputies

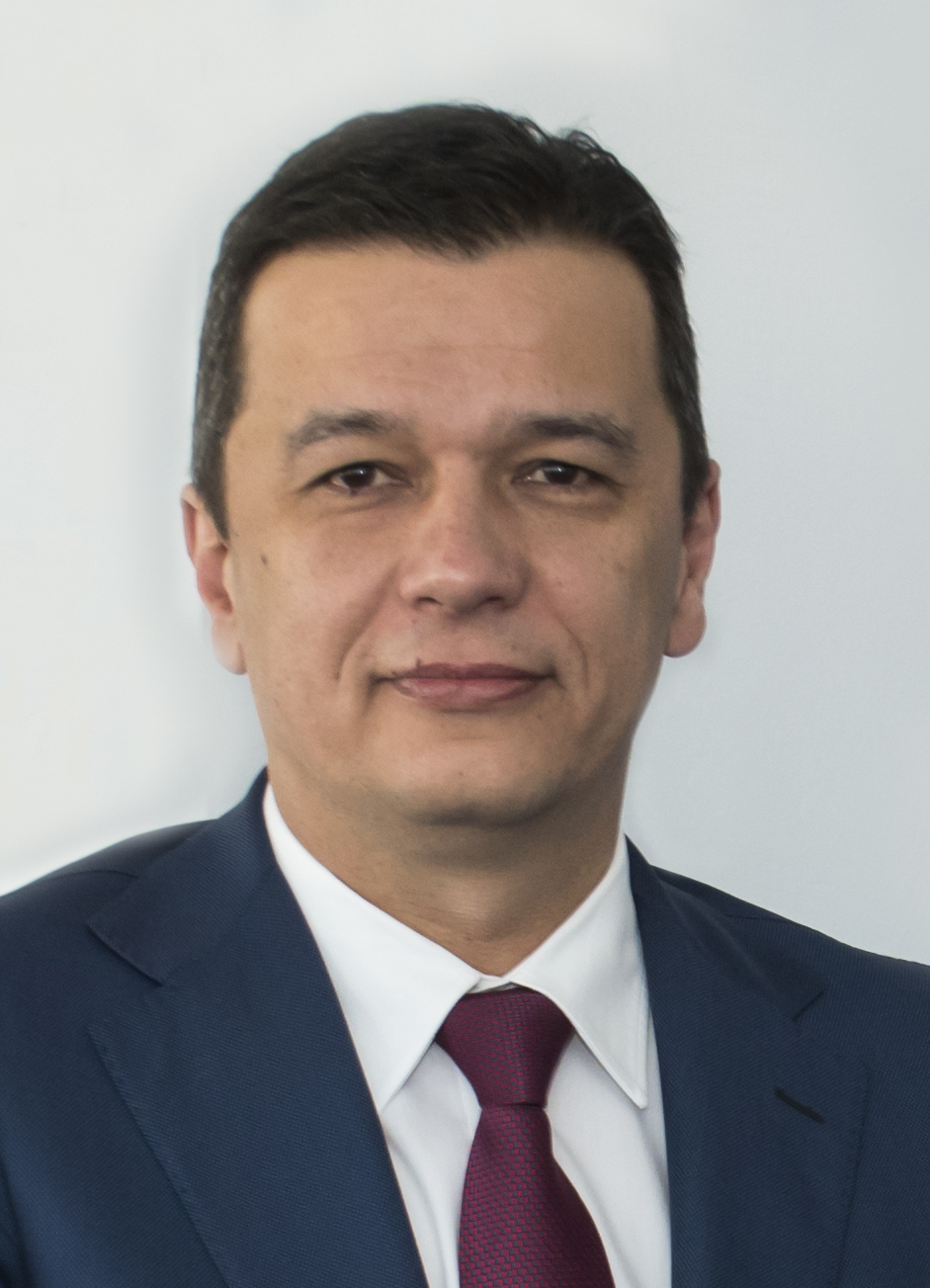
- Incumbent; Sorin Grindeanu since 24 June 2025
- Term length: 4 years
- Inaugural holder: Mitropolitul Nifon (1862); Dan Marțian (1990)
- Formation: 1862; 1990
- Succession: Second
- Website: www.cdep.ro/presedinte

The President of the Chamber of Deputies of Romania is the deputy elected to preside over the meetings in the lower chamber of the Parliament of Romania. The President of the Chamber of Deputies is also the president of the Standing Bureau of the Chamber of Deputies, and the second in the presidential line of succession, after the President of the Senate.

== Election ==
Last election: 2024

The president of the Chamber of Deputies is elected by secret ballot with the majority of votes of the deputies. If none of the candidates receives the absolute majority of votes, the first two compete again in a second ballot, and the one with most of the votes wins.

== Role ==
- Calls the Chamber of Deputies into ordinary or extraordinary session;
- Presides over the Chamber's meetings;
- Represents the Chamber of Deputies in the relation with the president, the Senate, the Government and the Constitutional Court;
- Represents the Chamber of Deputies in the foreign relations;
- Succeeds (ad interim) the president of Romania if the president of the Senate cannot do so. He/she continues to be president of the Chamber of Deputies during the ad-interim presidency of the country and acts as president until a new president is elected or the old president comes back in office after a failed impeachment.

== History ==
=== 1862–1948 ===
Between 1862 and 1948 the lower house was called Assembly of Deputies (Romanian: Adunarea Deputaților). In 1946, the Senate was abolished by a Governmental amendment to the 1923 Constitution, and the Parliament became unicameral.

=== 1948–1989 ===
The Legislative was called Great National Assembly (Romanian: Marea Adunare Națională).

=== 1990–1992 ===
The legislative became bicameral again, and the lower house was called again Assembly of Deputies (Romanian: Adunarea Deputaților), as part of the Constituent Assembly (Romanian: Adunarea Constituantă), elected together with the Senate to form both the legislative body and the body elected to write the new constitution. The assembly was headed by an elected president.

=== 1992–present ===
After the Constitution was voted, the assembly changed the name in Chamber of Deputies (Romanian: Camera Deputaților), headed by a president.

== List of officeholders ==
The political stance of presidents of the lower house prior to the development of a modern party system is given by the following key/legend:

C (Conservative)	MC (Moderate Conservative)
RL (Radical Liberal)	ML (Moderate Liberal)

The political stance of presidents of the lower house after the development of a modern party system is given by the following key/legend:

PNL = National Liberal Party (historical)/(contemporary)	PC = Conservative Party
PNR = Romanian National Party	PP = People's Party
PCD = Conservative-Democratic Party	PNȚ = National Peasants' Party
PND = Democratic Nationalist Party	PNC = National Christian Party
FRN = National Renaissance Front (from 1940 PN; Party of the Nation)	FP = Ploughmen's Front
PMR = Romanian Workers' Party (from 1965 PCR; Romanian Communist Party)	FSN = National Salvation Front
PDSR = Party of Social Democracy in Romania (from 2001 PSD; Social Democratic Party)	PNȚ-CD = Christian Democratic National Peasants' Party
PSDR = Romanian Social Democratic Party	PDL = Democratic Liberal Party (until 2008 PD; Democratic Party)
Mil. = Military	Ind. = Independent

Interim (acting) officeholders are denoted by italics. The Rule of the Chamber of Deputies states that at the first standing of the house, the meeting is headed by the eldest senator and helped by the youngest senator. Those bear the title of Interim President of the Senate, and, as their term is very short (one or two days) are not listed. The interim officeholders listed have hold the office in different circumstances and for a longer time (i.e. for more than one or two days).

#	Name	Portrait	Birth–Death	Took office	Left office	Party
Assembly of Deputies 1862–1947
1	Metropolitan-primate Nifon Rusailă		1789–1875	24 January 1862	2 May 1864	Ind.
2	Alexandru Emanoil Florescu		1822–1907	29 December 1864	25 June 1865	C
3	Emanoil Costache Epureanu		1823–1880	17 December 1865	3 January 1866	C
4	Nicolae Calimachi-Catargiu		?–1889	9 January 1866	12 February 1866	C
(3)	Emanoil Costache Epureanu		1823–1880	9 May 1866	6 July 1866	C
5	Lascăr Catargiu		1823–1899	7 December 1866	1 November 1867	C
6	Anastasie Fătu		1816–1886	15 January 1868	15 November 1868	RL
7	Ion C. Brătianu		1821–1891	18 November 1868	29 January 1869	RL
8	Costache Negri		1812–1876	8 May 1869	17 November 1869	ML
9	Grigore Balș		1826–1895	20 November 1869	1 May 1870	MC
10	Gheorghe Costaforu		1820–1876	2 July 1870	3 February 1871	C
11	Nicolae Păcleanu		?-1878	5 February 1871	16 March 1871	RL
12	Dimitrie Ghica		1816–1897	26 May 1871	17 February 1876	C
13	Constantin N. Brăiloiu		1809/1810–1889	18 February 1876	3 May 1876	C
14	Constantin A. Rosetti		1816–1885	25 June 1876	26 May 1878	PNL
15	George Vernescu		1829–1900	6 June 1878	15 November 1878	PNL
(14)	Constantin A. Rosetti		1816–1885	17 November 1878	9 June 1881	PNL
16	Dimitrie Brătianu		1818–1892	9 June 1881	21 October 1882	PNL
17	Dimitrie Lecca		1832–1888	21 October 1882	5 March 1883	PNL
(14)	Constantin A. Rosetti		1816–1885	16 May 1883	17 October 1883	PNL
(17)	Dimitrie Lecca		1832–1888	19 October 1883	4 July 1888	PNL
(5)	Lascăr Catargiu		1823–1899	10 November 1888	14 January 1889	PC
18	Constantin Grădișteanu		1833–1890	19 January 1889	16 November 1889	PC
19	Gheorghe Grigore Cantacuzino		1833–1913	16 November 1889	22 February 1891	PC
20	Gheorghe Rosnovanu		1832–1904	3 May 1891	11 December 1891	PC
21	Gheorghe Manu		1833–1911	26 February 1892	24 October 1895	PC
22	Petre S. Aurelian		1833–1909	9 December 1895	21 November 1896	PNL
23	Dimitrie Gianni		1838–1902	23 November 1896	21 April 1899	PNL
24	Constantin Olănescu		1845–1928	13 June 1899	25 September 1900	PC
(19)	Gheorghe Grigore Cantacuzino		1833–1913	25 September 1900	14 February 1901	PC
25	Mihail Pherekyde		1842–1926	24 March 1901	9 December 1904	PNL
26	Ștefan C. Șendrea		1842–1907	9 December 1904	23 December 1904	PNL
27	Grigore Trandafil		1840–1907	25 February 1905	23 February 1907	PC
28	Constantin Cantacuzino-Pașcanu		1856–1927	26 February 1907	26 April 1907	PC
(25)	Mihail Pherekyde		1842–1926	8 June 1907	15 December 1909	PNL
29	Basile M. Missir		1843–1929	15 December 1909	16 February 1910	PNL
(25)	Mihail Pherekyde		1842–1926	16 February 1910	10 January 1911	PNL
(24)	Constantin P. Olănescu		1845–1928	8 March 1911	17 October 1912	PC
(28)	Constantin Cantacuzino-Pașcanu		1856–1927	1 December 1912	11 January 1914	PCD
(25)	Mihail Pherekyde		1842–1926	21 February 1914	11 December 1916	PNL
30	Vasile Morțun		1860–1919	11 December 1916	25 April 1918	PNL
31	Constantin Meissner		1854–1942	5 June 1918	5 November 1918	PCP
32	Alexandru Vaida-Voevod		1872–1950	28 November 1919	1 December 1919	PNR
33	Nicolae Iorga		1871–1940	9 December 1919	26 March 1920	PND
34	Duiliu Zamfirescu		1858–1922	30 June 1920	22 January 1922	PP
35	Mihail Orleanu		1859–1942	6 April 1922	27 March 1926	PNL
36	Petre P. Negulescu		1872–1951	10 July 1926	5 June 1927	PP
37	Nicolae Săveanu		1866–1952	30 July 1927	10 November 1928	PNL
38	Ștefan Cicio Pop		1865–1934	23 December 1928	30 April 1931	PNȚ
39	Dimitrie Pompeiu		1873–1954	20 June 1931	10 June 1932	PND
(38)	Ștefan Cicio Pop		1865–1934	10 August 1932	18 November 1933	PNȚ
(37)	Nicolae Săveanu		1866–1952	10 February 1934	19 November 1937	PNL
(32)	Alexandru Vaida-Voevod		1872–1950	9 June 1939	5 September 1940	FRN
40	Mihail Sadoveanu		1880–1961	5 December 1946	24 February 1948	BPD
Great National Assembly 1948–1989
41	Gheorghe Apostol		1913–2010	7 April 1948	11 June 1948	PMR
42	Constantin Agiu		1891–1961	11 June 1948	27 December 1948	PMR
43	Constantin Pârvulescu		1895–1992	27 December 1948	5 July 1949	PMR
44	Dumitru Petrescu		1906–1969	5 July 1949	28 December 1949	PMR
45	Alexandru Drăghici		1913–1993	28 December 1949	26 January 1950	PMR
(44)	Dumitru Petrescu		1906–1969	26 January 1950	29 May 1950	PMR
46	Constantin Doncea		1904–1973	29 May 1950	6 September 1950	PMR
(41)	Gheorghe Apostol		1913–2010	6 September 1950	5 April 1951	PMR
47	Ion Vincze		1910–1996	5 April 1951	26 March 1952	PMR
(41)	Gheorghe Apostol		1913–2010	26 March 1952	2 June 1952	PMR
48	Gheorghe Stoica		1900–1976	2 June 1952	30 November 1952	PMR
(43)	Constantin Pârvulescu		1895–1992	23 January 1953	5 March 1961	PMR
49	Ștefan Voitec		1900–1984	20 March 1961	28 March 1974	PMR/PCR
50	Miron Constantinescu		1917–1974	28 March 1974	18 July 1974	PCR
51	Nicolae Giosan		1921–1990	26 July 1974	22 December 1989	PCR
Assembly of Deputies 1990–1992
52	Dan Marțian		1935–2002	19 June 1990	16 October 1992	FSN
Chamber of Deputies since 1992
53	Adrian Năstase		1950–	28 October 1992	22 November 1996	FDSN/PDSR
54	Ion Diaconescu		1917–2011	27 November 1996	30 November 2000	PNȚCD
55	Valer Dorneanu		1944–	15 December 2000	30 November 2004	PDSR/PSD
(53)	Adrian Năstase		1950–	19 December 2004	16 March 2006	PSD
56	Bogdan Olteanu		1971–	20 March 2006	13 December 2008	PNL
57	Roberta Anastase		1976–	19 December 2008	3 July 2012	PDL
58	Valeriu Zgonea		1967–	3 July 2012	19 December 2012	PSD
58	Valeriu Zgonea		1967–	19 December 2012	13 June 2016	PSD
59	Florin Iordache		1960–	13 June 2016	21 December 2016	PSD
60	Liviu Dragnea		1962–	21 December 2016	27 May 2019	PSD
–	Carmen-Ileana Mihălcescu		1970–	28 May 2019	29 May 2019	PSD
61	Marcel Ciolacu		1967–	29 May 2019	19 December 2020	PSD
–	Carmen-Ileana Mihălcescu		1970–	19 December 2020	20 December 2020	PSD
62	Ludovic Orban		1963–	22 December 2020	18 October 2021	PNL
–	Florin Roman		1974–	18 October 2021	2 November 2021	PNL
–	Sorin Grindeanu		1973–	2 November 2021	23 November 2021	PSD
(61)	Marcel Ciolacu		1967–	23 November 2021	15 June 2023	PSD
–	Alfred Simonis		1985–	15 June 2023	2 September 2024	PSD
63	Daniel Suciu		1980–	2 September 2024	23 December 2024	PSD
64	Ciprian-Constantin Șerban		1985–	23 December 2024	23 June 2025	PSD
65	Sorin Grindeanu		1973–	24 June 2025	Incumbent	PSD
