= Trandafil =

Trandafil is a surname. Notable people with the surname include:

- Grigore Trandafil (1840–1907), Wallachian-born Romanian magistrate and politician
- Marija Trandafil (1816–1883), Serbian philanthropist
