= Nicolae Calimachi-Catargiu =

Romanian politician

Nicolae Callimachi-Catargiu

Minister of Foreign Affairs
- In office November 28, 1869 – February 1, 1870
- Monarch: Carol I of Romania
- Preceded by: Dimitrie Ghica
- Succeeded by: Alexandru G. Golescu
- In office December 18, 1870 – March 11, 1871
- Preceded by: Petre P. Carp
- Succeeded by: Gheorghe Costa-Foru

Personal details
- Born: February 24, 1830 Iași, Principality of Moldavia
- Died: November 9, 1882 (aged 52) Paris, France
- Education: University of Iași

Nicolae Callimachi-Catargiu (February 24, 1830 – November 9, 1882) was a conservative Romanian politician who served as the Minister of Foreign Affairs in two terms from November 28, 1869, to February 1, 1870, and December 18, 1870, until March 11, 1871, and as a Romanian envoy to London and Paris.

== Biography ==
=== Family ===
His father was the Logothete Ștefan Catargiu (1789-1866), a member of the Three-headed Kaymakam from the Principality of Moldavia (1857 - October 20, 1858), and his mother was Ruxandra Calimachi (1808-1892), who insisted that he bear the name of the great family from which she came.

He had three brothers, Alexandru Catargiu, and from his mother's second marriage to Prince Alecu Rosetti-Roznovanu (1798-1853)):

- Prince Alecu Rosett-Roznovanu
- Princess Adela Rosetti-Roznovanu (1835-1894); married firstly to Prince Alexandru Ghika (1831-1903); married secondly Gheorghe Catargiu (d. 1907)
- Prince Gheorghe Rosetti-Rosnovanu (1834-1904); married Alexandrine Câmpineanu and had issue

=== Education ===
He studied at the University of Iași and, from 1857, in Paris. He was elected an MP in the Constituent Assembly in 1866, in which, along with other personalities such as Constantin Grădișteanu, Nicolae Gr. Racoviță, Aristid Pascal opposed to the draft of the Constitution issued by the government, which concerned individual rights and freedoms. From 1876 he became a member of the Junimea society and entered politics, being twice appointed as a Minister of Foreign Affairs in the Dimitrie Ghica cabinet (November 28, 1869-27 January 1870) and in the Third Ion Ghica cabinet (December 18, 1870-11 March 1871).

=== Diplomat ===
In 1875 he was sent as an agent of Romania to Paris (1875–1876; 1877–1880) and held this position until 1880, when he was appointed the Plenipotentiary Minister in London, presenting his credentials on July 31, 1880) He ended his mission in London in 1881 (presenting his recall letters on August 10, 1881). The reason for the end of the mission was the irritation of the British government due to the disclosure of some secrets of the Romanian Ministry of Foreign Affairs by M. Callimaki Catargi, materialized by the unauthorized publication of fragments of diplomatic correspondence between Romania and other powers, which harmed Austria's interests revealing the objectives and policy pursued by Brătianu regarding the Danube issue. The publication of diplomatic telegrams by Nicolae Calimachi-Catargiu was followed by an interpellation both in the Romanian Senate and in the Chamber of Deputies, requesting his sending to court according to art. 305 of the Penal Code. The proposal was put to the vote. In the same year he was sent back on a mission to Paris. During this time, he wrote the bilingual work "Appendice au livre vert roumain sur la question du Danube" / "Appendix to the Romanian Green Paper on the Danube Question" (31 pages), which he published in 1881 in Paris, impr. de Chaix, under the signature of N. Callimaki-Catargi.
