= Mihail Pherekyde =

Romanian politician and diplomat (1842–1926)

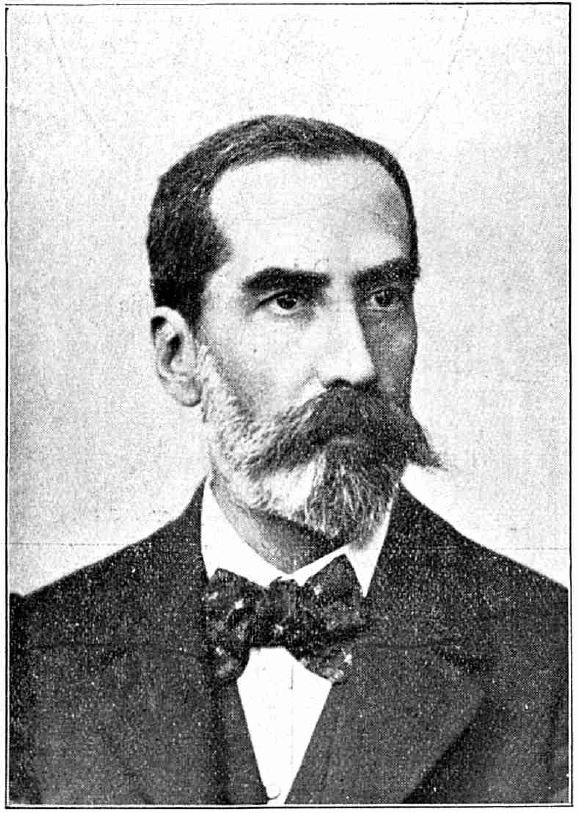
- 1910 illustration of Pherekyde

President of the Senate of Romania
- In office 31 March 1922 – 24 January 1926
- Monarch: Ferdinand I
- Preceded by: Constantin Coandă
- Succeeded by: Constantin I. Nicolaescu

President of the Assembly of Deputies
- In office 24 March 1901 – 9 December 1904
- Monarch: Carol I of Romania
- Preceded by: Gheorghe Grigore Cantacuzino
- Succeeded by: Ștefan C. Șendrea
- In office 8 June 1907 – 15 December 1909
- Preceded by: Constantin Cantacuzino-Pașcanu
- Succeeded by: Basile M. Missir
- In office 16 February 1910 – 10 January 1911
- Preceded by: Basile M. Missir
- Succeeded by: Constantin P. Olănescu
- In office 21 February 1914 – 11 December 1916
- Preceded by: Constantin Cantacuzino-Pașcanu
- Succeeded by: Vasile Morțun

Minister of Foreign Affairs
- In office December 16, 1885 – March 21, 1888
- Monarch: Carol I of Romania
- Preceded by: Ion Brătianu
- Succeeded by: Petre P. Carp

Minister of Internal Affairs
- In office March 31, 1897 – March 30, 1899
- Monarch: Carol I of Romania
- Preceded by: Vasile Lascăr
- Succeeded by: Gheorghe Cantacuzino
- In office December 15, 1909 – February 6, 1910
- Preceded by: Ion I. C. Brătianu
- Succeeded by: Ion I. C. Brătianu

Personal details
- Born: November 14, 1842 Bucharest, Wallachia
- Died: January 24, 1926 (aged 83) Bucharest, Kingdom of Romania
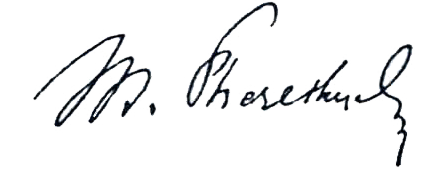
- Signature

Mihail Pherekyde (November 14, 1842 – January 24, 1926) was a Romanian politician and diplomat who served as the President of the Senate, President of the Assembly of Deputies, Minister of Foreign Affairs and two terms as the Minister of Internal Affairs of Kingdom of Romania.

== Life and political career ==
Pherekyde attended St. Sava School and then the Lycée Louis-le-Grand in Paris. He graduated from the University of Sorbonne with a degree in Law. He was a member of newly formed Liberal Party of Romania established in 1875. On December 16, 1885, he took the post of the Minister of Foreign Affairs and was replaced by Petre P. Carp on March 21, 1888. He also served as Romanian envoy to France and played a role in acquisition of a building for Romanian Orthodox Church in Paris. Pherekyde was then appointed Minister of Internal Affairs on March 31, 1897 within Dimitrie Sturdza's government and served until March 30, 1899. He held the same office from December 15, 1909 until February 6, 1910.

== See also ==
- Foreign relations of Romania
