= 1905 Romanian general election =

General elections were held in Romania in February 1905. Members of the Chamber of Deputies were elected on 1, 3 and 5 February, with members of the Senate elected on 7 and 9 February. The elections followed the resignation of Prime Minister Dimitrie Sturdza on 3 January.

== Electoral system ==
The Chamber of Deputies was elected by three colleges of voters; one for wealthy residents of rural areas (15,973 voters), one for wealthy residents of urban areas (34,742 voters) and one for peasants, who were the majority of the population but of whom only 42,907 qualified to vote. The two colleges for wealth voters elected 145 members while the one for peasants elected only 38.

The Senate was elected was elected by two colleges with stricter income and property ownership criteria. Its colleges had 10,659 and 13,912 members.
