= Mihail Orleanu =

Romanian politician (1859–1942)

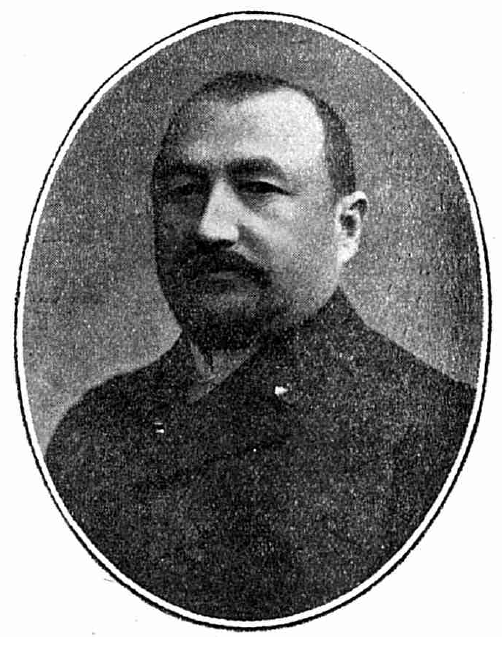
Orleanu in 1910, while in government

Mihail G. Orleanu (November 20, 1859–January 31, 1942) was a Romanian magistrate and politician.

Orleanu's family were originally Ottoman Greeks of Phanariote descent who entered the Wallachian boyar class. Wealthy people, they settled in Buzău County and then Focșani, where Orleanu was born, ultimately moving to Galați. He graduated from the private Institutele Academice in Iași in 1876. Orleanu then studied law at the University of Paris, obtaining a doctorate in 1881. His thesis, published the following year, deals with illegitimate children in Roman law, and is his chief written work. After returning home, he entered the magistracy, holding a series of posts: prosecutor at the Iași tribunal (1882), then in Bucharest, judge at the Putna County tribunal (1882), president of the Dorohoi tribunal (1883), followed by Râmnicu Sărat (1884), prosecutor at the Galați appeals court (1887-1889). He retired from the judicial system in 1889, entering politics and joining the National Liberal Party (PNL). First elected to the Assembly of Deputies in 1895, he was returned for a number of terms. A fervent supporter of industrialization, from November 1909 to December 1910, he served as Minister of Industry and Commerce under Ion I. C. Brătianu. He authored the 1909 law restricting the right of some 160,000 state employees to unionize and strike; this was called the Orleanu Law or, by its socialist adversaries, the "wicked law".

Orleanu served as Assembly President for a fairly lengthy term, April 1922 to March 1926. The early part of this period was marked by debate on what would become the 1923 Constitution, which was adopted by the PNL majority in spite of strong opposition. Additionally, the Assembly adopted a series of laws meant to ensure the political, administrative and economic unification of the new Greater Romania. Among these were laws on the organization of the Romanian Army, the judicial system, mines, energy, primary and normal schools, repression of offenses against public order (the anti-communist 1924 Mârzescu Law), founding the Romanian Patriarchate and restructuring the Romanian Orthodox Church. He took part in the Crown Council meeting held at Sinaia on the last day of 1925, where a debate was held regarding Prince Carol's decision to renounce his rights to the throne. Days later, the Assembly, presided by Orleanu, together with the Senate, meeting as a constituent assembly, took note of Carol's decision, proclaimed Michael as heir and established a regency. Also in 1926, a law establishing an electoral bonus was passed. In 1927, Orleanu became a senator by right. He died in Galați.

Orleanu was married to Valentina Gheorghiadi. The couple had two sons and two daughters; one of the latter, also called Valentina, married Victor Slăvescu.
