= Gheorghe Costaforu =

Romanian politician, lawyer and university professor

Minister of Foreign Affairs
- In office March 11, 1871 – April 27, 1873
- Prime Minister: Lascăr Catargiu
- Preceded by: Nicolae Callimachi-Catargiu
- Succeeded by: Vasile Boerescu

President of the Assembly of Deputies
- In office 2 July 1870 – 3 February 1871
- Monarch: Carol I of Romania
- Preceded by: Grigore Balș
- Succeeded by: Nicolae Păcleanu

Personal details
- Born: October 26, 1816 Bucharest, Principality of Wallachia
- Died: November 28, 1876 (aged 60) Bucharest, Kingdom of Romania
- Children: Constantin Costa-Foru
- Education: Sorbonne University
- Profession: Lawyer, professor
- Employer: University of Bucharest

Gheorghe Costaforu (October 26, 1820 – November 28, 1876) was a lawyer, university professor and Romanian politician who served as the Minister of Foreign Affairs.

== Life and career ==
A graduate of Law School at Sorbonne University, Costa-Foru became the author of contemporary education system in Romania. He was one of the initiators of a large university palace complex construction at the University of Bucharest which was started in 1857. In 1864, he was appointed the university's first rector by decree of Alexandru Ioan Cuza, serving until 1871. From March 11, 1871 to April 27, 1873, Costa-Foru served as Minister of Foreign Affairs and in 1873, he was the Romanian envoy to Vienna. He also served as President of the Assembly of Deputies from July 2, 1870 to February 3, 1871.
