= Valer Dorneanu =

Romanian politician and jurist

Valer Dorneanu (born 21 November 1944) is a Romanian politician and jurist. A prominent member of the Social Democratic Party (PSD), Dorneanu was the president of the Chamber of Deputies (the lower house of the Romanian Parliament) between December 2000 and November 2004. He spent four additional years in the Chamber, departing at the 2008 election. From 18 October 2010 to 28 March 2013, he was adjoint to the Romanian Ombudsman office, in the military, juridical, police, and penitentiary areas. From 3 July 2012 to 23 January 2013, he functioned interimistically as the Ombudsman (Avocatului Poporului). From 2013 to 2022 he was a judge in Romania's Constitutional Court, for a mandate of 9 years, and the president of this institution from 2016 until the end of his mandate.

== Biography ==
In 1967, Dorneanu graduated from the Faculty of Law at the University of Bucharest. He has since become a Professor in the Faculty of Political Science at the University of Bucharest. From 1967 to 1974 he was a prosecutor at the courts of Sector 5 and Sector 6 in Bucharest. During the Communist era, he was one of the ideologues of former President and dictator Nicolae Ceaușescu.

In 2002, Dorneanu was awarded the Order of the Star of Romania, Knight rank.
