= Constantin Grădișteanu =

Romanian politician

Grădișteanu family arms

Constantin Grădișteanu (17 September 1833–10 April 1890) was a Wallachian-born Romanian politician.

== Biography ==
Descended from an old boyar family, he was the son of Șerban Grădișteanu (1785-1833) and his second wife, Aristita Buzescu (b. 1807). He studied at Paris, earning a degree in literature from the Sorbonne in 1852 and then attending the law faculty. In February 1866, he was named prefect of Ilfov County before being transferred to a similar post in Putna County the following month. A conservative, he was part of the constituent assembly in 1866, the same year he was first elected to the Assembly of Deputies. In 1876, he was sent to the senate. From April to December 1870, Grădișteanu served as Finance Minister in the cabinet of Manolache Costache Epureanu. He was Assembly President from January to November 1889, and died in Bucharest the following year.

== Personal life ==
He was married to Elena Sihleanu, daughter of Zamfirache Sihleanu, who served as Paharnik and his wife, Maria Popescu. Her brother was Alexandru Sihleanu.
