= Grigore Balș =

Romanian politician

Grigore Balș (d. 1895) was a Moldavian-born Romanian politician.

Born into an old Moldavian boyar family, the son of a logothete, Balș was active in the movement for the Union of the Principalities. In 1858, he edited Constituționalul magazine at Iași, taking a pro-union line. He was part of the first Moldavian government following the achievement of this objective with the election of Alexandru Ioan Cuza as domnitor in early 1859, serving as finance minister under Vasile Sturdza from January to March that year. He was then foreign minister in the cabinet of Manolache Costache Epureanu from November 1859 to March 1860.

After the political union of Moldavia with Wallachia, in January 1862, Balș was named to the first government encompassing all Romania. Within the cabinet of Barbu Catargiu, he was Minister of Religious Affairs and Public Instruction for several days in January. He was then reshuffled to become Finance Minister, remaining until March. Following the advent of constitutional monarchy in 1866, he was elected deputy (1866) and senator (1867). He served as Assembly President from November 1869 to May 1870. In 1880, he signed the founding statute of the Conservative Party.
