= Nicolae Săveanu =

Romanian politician and academic

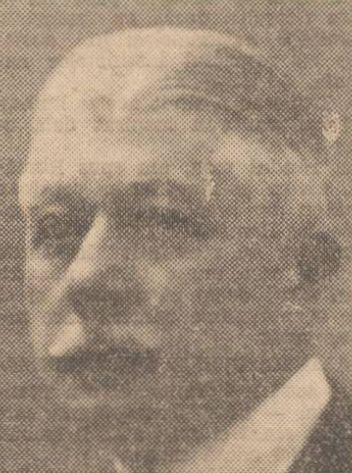
Image of N.N. Săveanu

Nicolae N. Săveanu (October 11, 1866–1952) was a Romanian politician and academic.

Born in Bârlad, he earned degrees in law and philosophy from the University of Bucharest and was subsequently a philosophy professor there. Săveanu eventually became a prominent member of the National Liberal Party, and first entered the Assembly of Deputies in 1898. He was named prefect of Putna County in February 1901, of Prahova County in August 1902 and again for Putna (December 1902-December 1904 and March 1907). He was elected to the Senate in 1907. He served as general secretary of the Interior Ministry twice: July 1908-December 1910 and 1914–1918. Under Ion I. C. Brătianu, he was Public Health and Social Protection Minister from October 1923 to March 1926. He became a senator by right in 1928. Săveanu served two terms as President of the Assembly: from July 1927 to November 1928, and from February 1934 to November 1937. He died in Bucharest.

His son Radu was married to Ioana (née Dumitrescu), who had an affair with Prince Nicholas beginning in 1927; probably at his parents' insistence, Radu obtained a divorce the following year.
