= Vasile Morțun =

Romanian politician, playwright and prose writer (1860 - 1919)

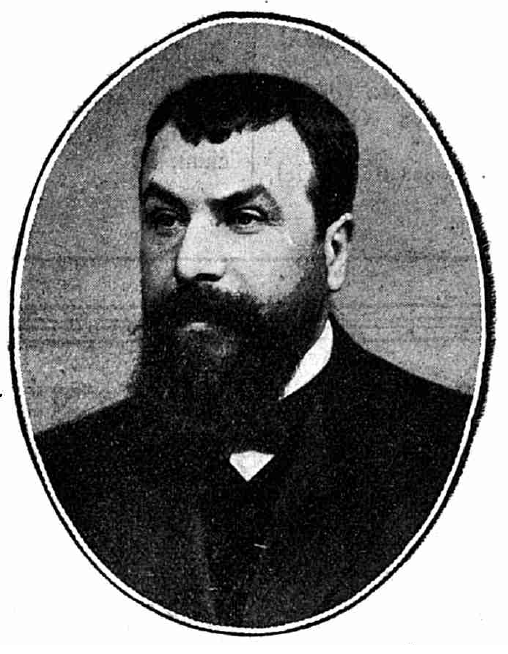
- Morțun in 1910

President of the Assembly of Deputies
- In office 11 December 1916 – 25 April 1918
- Monarch: Ferdinand I of Romania
- Preceded by: Mihail Pherekyde
- Succeeded by: Constantin Meissner

Minister of Internal Affairs
- In office 4 January 1914 – 11 December 1916
- Monarch: Ferdinand I of Romania
- Preceded by: Take Ionescu
- Succeeded by: Alexandru Constantinescu

Personal details
- Born: November 30, 1860 Roman, United Principalities of Moldavia and Wallachia
- Died: July 20, 1919 (aged 58) Broșteni, Kingdom of Romania
- Party: Social Democratic Workers' Party of Romania (until 1899); National Liberal Party (from 1899)

Vasile G. Morțun (November 30, 1860 – July 20, 1919) was a Romanian politician, playwright and prose writer.

== Biography ==
=== Origins, journalism and political beginnings ===
Born in Roman, he came from a wealthy Moldavian boyar family, and was of Armenian origin. After studying at the private Institutul Academic in Iași and at the Parisian Collège Sainte-Barbe, he enrolled in the literature and philosophy faculties at Paris and Brussels, but did not graduate. He returned to Romania in 1885, and by 1892 had begun the passionate acquisition of an art collection that was famous in its day. Morțun founded and led, alone or in collaboration with Ioan Nădejde, Constantin Mille and Vintilă Rosetti, numerous gazettes and magazines: Dacia viitoare, Muncitorul, Revista socială, Ciocoiul and Înainte!. Beginning in 1885, he edited the literature section of the socialist magazine Contemporanul. He also contributed to Adevărul, Almanahul social-democrat, Calendarul pozitivist, Critica socială, Drepturile omului, Evenimentul literar, Flacăra, Generația nouă, Literatură și știință, Lumea nouă, Lumea nouă științifică și literară, Munca, Revista democrației române, Rodica, Telegraful Român, Viața Românească and Viața socială. Aside from political articles, he published prose poems that remained in the pages of various periodicals, articles on dramatic theory (Chestii teatrale, in Contemporanul, 1887) and plays (Ștefan Hudici, Zulniea Hâncu, both 1891). He wrote a few translations and adaptations from Jules de Marthold (Pascal Fargeau, novel, 1882), Edmond Gondinet, Alexander Pushkin, Leo Tolstoy, Mikhail Lermontov and Fyodor Dostoyevsky; these remained in the pages of Contemporanul. Morțun published an edition of Mihai Eminescu's work (Proză și versuri, 1890), which included several posthumous writings.

A socialist journalist and activist, he was a leader of the Romanian Social Democratic Workers' Party and entered parliament on its lists, but was among its prominent members who joined the National Liberal Party in 1899. Beginning in January 1888, when he was elected to represent Roman County as the first socialist in the Assembly of Deputies, Morțun served multiple terms there, and was its President from December 1916 to April 1918. Additionally, he entered the Senate in 1914. He was Minister of Public Works from March 1907 to December 1910 and Interior Minister from January 1914 to December 1916, under Dimitrie Sturdza and Ion I. C. Brătianu.

=== Interior Minister ===
As Interior Minister, Morțun took part in the Crown Council meeting of August 1914, supporting Romania's neutrality in World War I; and in the session of August 1916, where he backed Romania's entry into the war on the side of the Allies. During the two years of neutrality, he led counterespionage efforts against the Central Powers, who had numerous spies working in the country, and coordinated efforts by the Romanian Police to lay the groundwork for the eventual seizure of Transylvania from Austria-Hungary. Once Romania entered the war, the ministry was involved in securing provisions for the army and ensuring public order, including in newly occupied territories.

When the war started going badly for Romania as the autumn of 1916 wore on, the ministry was involved in organizing resistance to German-led occupation, destroying the petroleum infrastructure, sinking grain deposits in the Danube and sending the Romanian Treasure to Moscow. When the army began retreating into Moldavia, Morțun was blamed for his handling of the material evacuation, in particular of the grain supply. He was also criticized for not working ahead of time to create an informants' network in potentially occupied areas. He exited the government right after the Battle of Bucharest resulted in the capital falling to the Central Powers and the national leadership moving to Iași. During his subsequent time as Assembly president, he oversaw the June 1917 adoption of reforms to the Constitution, providing for electoral and land reform, and the April 1918 ratification of the union of Bessarabia with Romania. He owned an estate in Broșteni, Neamț County, outside Roman; during the 1907 peasants' revolt, a mob of some 400 peasants destroyed the house of its Jewish leaseholder. Morțun himself, who lived to see much of his estate expropriated, died in Broșteni in 1919, and was buried on the premises.
