= Marilena Bocu =

Romanian folklorist and politician

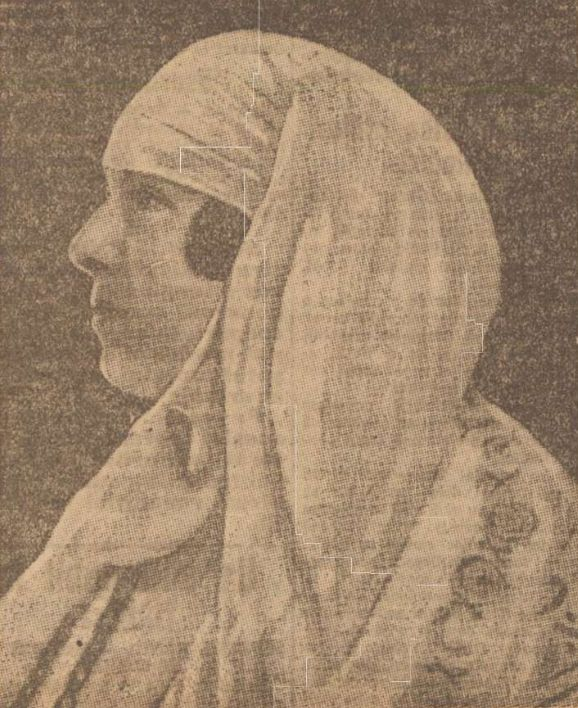
- Marilena Bocu was one of the first three female mayors elected in Romania in 1930
- Born: Sinaia, Romania
- Died: 1970; Geneva, Switzerland
- Occupations: Folklorist and politician
- Known for: Election as mayor in 1930
- Spouse: Sever Bocu

Marilena Bocu (or Marilina Bocu, née Manolescu; died 1970) was a Romanian folklorist and politician who was one of the first three women in the country to be elected mayor of a city in 1930, the first year in which women became eligible to vote and hold elected office. She became mayor of the town of Lipova in Arad County.

== Biography ==
She was born in Sinaia, Romania, the daughter of the mayor; her brother was actor Ion Manolescu. In 1906, Sever Bocu, the Arad-based editor of Tribuna newspaper, undertook a publicity tour of the Romanian Old Kingdom. During this trip, he met Marilena, and the couple married the following year. They lived in Lipova with their children while Sever became a prominent member of the Romanian National Party and, from 1926, the National Peasants' Party.

Marilena Bocu enjoyed promoting Romanian values and traditions. She was a well-known collector and organizer of exhibitions of fabrics, embroidery and traditional art. The family lived in their Bocu mansion from 1922 until 1953. The family art collection later formed the basis of the Lipova City Museum that is presently housed in the Bocu Mansion.

Marilena Bocu was a centerpiece of the social and cultural life of Lipova. She headed the Red Cross branch in the city and was a writer and a reciter at various literary and musical events. In 1923, Bocu organized a traveling exhibition of Romanian embroideries and fabrics, which visited several cities in the United States. Two years later, she organized and attended a similar exhibition, which was "an unexpected sensation," during the second interparliamentary congress, held at the Mayflower Hotel in Washington D.C.

=== Activist ===
An activist for the rights of Romanians living in the historical region of Banat, Bocu led the delegates from the three Banat counties and participated in the Great National Assembly in Alba Iulia, Romania.

In the Kingdom of Romania, women had only gained the right to vote and to stand for election in municipal and state elections in August 1929, but women's suffrage at that time was still dependent on a woman's level of education, social standing and "special services to society." Only literate women over 30 were allowed to vote.

In 1930, Bocu ran for mayor on the electoral lists of the National Peasant Party and won in her city of Lipova. This put her among the first three women in the country to be elected to political office. Meanwhile, in the nation's capital, Bucharest, seven other women were elected to the city council for the first time.

At that time, the spa town of Lipova in Arad County was the largest city in Romania to be governed by a woman. In her new position Bocu made remarkable gains. According to one source, "Since her installation at the town hall, the entire pavement has been changed, the Mureș River has been dammed, a slaughterhouse has been created, electric lighting has been introduced, the building of the town hall has begun, and a communal pasture has been created."

=== Communist years ===
In 1950, during the communist regime, her husband was imprisoned, leaving her alone with her two grandchildren. Later, they were evicted from the Bocu Mansion and her art collections were confiscated. By 1954, she had been sent to Western Moldavia, where she sent a memorandum to Petru Groza, leader of Romania asking for news about her husband and requesting permission to "receive financial aid from her daughter and grandchildren settled in the United States." She did receive financial aid from the state. Eventually, she fled to Geneva, Switzerland, where she died in 1970.
