= Nicolae Gr. Racoviță =

Romanian politician

Prince Nicolae Gr. Racoviță (July 17, 1835 – March 15 [O.S. March 3] 1895) was a Wallachian-born Romanian politician. He is an aristocrat and member of the House of Racoviță.

Born in Craiova, his parents were the high postelnic Prince Grigore Racoviță and his wife Cleopatra Brăiloiu, daughter of high aga Nicolae Brăiloiu. He studied law at the University of Berlin, obtaining a doctorate. After returning home, he worked in the administrative and judiciary systems. A moderate Liberal, Racoviță served as interim Foreign Minister for three days in December 1870. From December 1870 to March 1871, he was Minister of Religious Affairs and Public Instruction in the cabinet of Ion Ghica. From 1876 to 1880, he was president of the Dolj County Council, and was mayor of his native city from 1888 to 1890.

Racoviță was an editor at Alexandru Odobescu's Bucharest-based magazine Revista istorică in 1862. In 1867, 1868 and 1870, he edited the weekly Nepărtinitorul, a poetic and literary journal. He was friends with the Junimea group, and was a talented pianist who composed sonatas.

He was married to Despina Socolescu, the niece of Theodor Aman. Racoviță died in Rome and was buried in Craiova.
