= Constantin Cantacuzino-Pașcanu =

Romanian politician

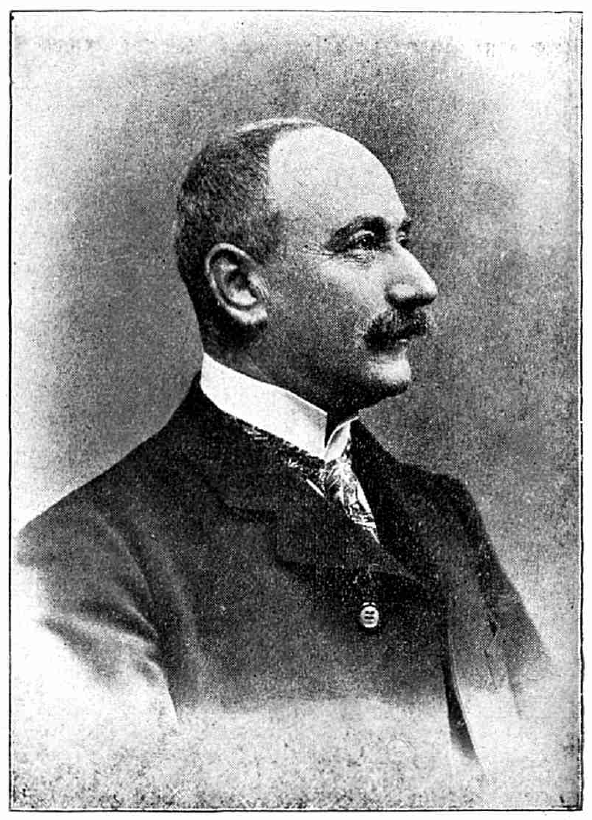

Constantin Cantacuzino-Pașcanu (1856–January 30, 1927) was a Romanian politician.

Born into the Moldavian branch of the boyar Cantacuzino family, his father Lascarache was a vornic. After completing legal studies at the University of Paris, Cantacuzino returned home and joined the Conservative Party. He was first elected deputy in 1891 and senator in 1903. From the time of its founding in 1908, he was a prominent member of the Conservative-Democratic Party.

Cantacuzino served as President of the Assembly of Deputies twice: February to April 1907 and December 1912 to January 1914. A number of laws were passed under his watch, including one for organizing the Romanian Army and another ratifying the Treaty of Bucharest. In the summer of 1914, he took part in the meetings of the Crown Council held at Sinaia, arguing for Romania's neutrality in World War I. Two years later, he took part in the Crown Council meeting at Cotroceni Palace, voting for Romania's entry into the war on the side of the Allies. He became a senator by right in 1926, and died the following year at Neuilly-sur-Seine.
