= Constantin Meissner =

Romanian pedagogue and schoolteacher

Constantin Meissner (May 27, 1854–September 19, 1942) was a Romanian pedagogue and schoolteacher.

Born in Iași in the Principality of Moldavia (present-day Romania), his family was of German origin. He studied at the private Institutul Academic, followed by two years (1870-1872) at Iași University. With the help of his professor Titu Maiorescu, he was sent to the universities of Vienna and Berlin in 1873 in order to complete his studies. After returning home, he taught German language and literature at an Iași school for the sons of soldiers between 1878 and 1891. Meanwhile, in the autumn of 1879, he won a competition for the pedagogy professorate at the local Vasile Lupu Normal School, remaining there until retiring in 1913. During this period, he also taught German at the Pedagogical Institute and at a private girls' high school. He was a trusted confidant to renowned university professors who also taught in schools, such as Petru Poni, Grigore Cobălcescu, A. D. Xenopol, Aron Densușianu and Alexandru Lambrior. Over the course of his career, Meissner also formed part of the administration at various schools.

From 1910 to 1912, he was general secretary in the Religious Affairs and Public Instruction Ministry, and in this capacity addressed problems of school administration. He was elected to multiple terms in the Assembly of Deputies, and around the time of World War I was president of the Iași Conservative Party organization. In March 1918, he became Industry and Commerce Minister in the government of Alexandru Marghiloman, serving until his resignation that June. Also that year, from June to November, he was President of the Assembly. At that time a member of the ephemeral Progressive Conservative Party, he later joined Alexandru Averescu's People's Party, becoming head of the Iași chapter. In July 1926, upon the resignation of Petru Groza, he entered Averescu's cabinet as Public Works Minister, serving until June 1927. In 1902, together with Paul Bujor and other intellectuals, he helped found a society for gymnastics, sport and music. Becoming a close friend to Maiorescu, he was a member of the latter's Junimea organization.

Meissner focused on educating the common people, choosing a career in primary education and in training village teachers. He drafted laws, regulations, reports, teaching plans and schedules, striving to apply efficient methods. He proposed different types of schools for distinct purposes, wrote textbooks and pedagogical treatises and held conferences for teachers. From 1886, when he became director at Vasile Lupu, he was consulted by Education Ministers, and was a constant advisor to ministers from 1892 onward. The university held a lavish 80th birthday celebration for him in 1934, and four days later, he was elected an honorary member of the Romanian Academy. At the same time, the applied primary school affiliated with Vasile Lupu was named in his honor. He died in 1942 and was buried at Eternitatea cemetery.

In 1905, he married Elena Buznea, a women's rights activist.
