= Dimitrie Gianni =

Wallachian-born Romanian lawyer and politician (1838–1902)

Dimitrie Gianni (nicknamed Tache Gianni; 15 July 1838–27 June 1902) was a Wallachian-born Romanian lawyer and politician.

Born in Bucharest, he descended from a Greek family that had settled in Wallachia. After attending a gymnasium in Berlin, he went to the University of Paris, receiving a law degree. Gianni returned to Romania in 1865 and was named prosecutor at the Bucharest criminal court. In 1867, he became an adviser at the Finance Ministry. Subsequently, he practised as a lawyer for the remainder of his career, rising to become dean of the Ilfov County bar in 1896.

Gianni entered politics in 1867, and thenceforth served as a deputy in all liberal-controlled legislatures. In 1875, he was among the founders of the National Liberal Party (PNL), and also helped found the party's first newspaper, Alegătorul liber (1875-1876). In 1876, he was a prominent member of the Romanian Democratic Union. He served as Minister of Justice twice during the long years of PNL government: from July 1880 to April 1881, and again at the very end, in March 1888. He was a participant in the two crucial political acts of this period: the recognition of Romania's independence (1878) and its proclamation as a kingdom (1881). As minister, he took the initiative for building the Palace of Justice, naming a committee that drafted the initial plans.

Eventually, Gianni entered the PNL's dissident faction, and in November 1885 joined the leadership of the Liberal-Democratic Party created by Dumitru C. Brătianu. From 1896 to 1899, he was part of the drapelist group, before rejoining the main PNL. From November 1896 to April 1899, he was President of the Assembly of Deputies. During this time, a number of modernizing measures were adopted, including the law on Casa rurală bank and the law for Sunday rest (both 1897), as well as the law on secondary and higher education, initiated by Spiru Haret (1898).
