= Constantin Olănescu =

Wallachian (later Romanian) politician

Constantin P. Olănescu (Romanian pronunciation: [konstanˈtin oləˈnesku]; 1845–May 14, 1928) was a Wallachian, later Romanian politician.

Descended from an old Oltenian boyar family, his father Pană was also in politics. He was born in Bucharest and studied at the École Centrale des Arts et Manufactures in Paris. Upon his return home, Olănescu was successively named head of public works for Craiova (1869), department head at the Agriculture, Commerce and Public Works Ministry (1875), prefect of Brăila County (1876), professor of elementary and applied mechanics at the School of Bridges, Roads and Mines (1878–1880), teacher at the silviculture school outside Bucharest (1884–1885) and deputy general director of Căile Ferate Române railway (1883).

A member of the Conservative Party (PC), he was first elected to the Assembly of Deputies in October 1888, and won a term in the Senate in 1905. From early 1891 to late 1895, he served as Public Works Minister in the two successive PC cabinets of Ioan Emanoil Florescu and Lascăr Catargiu. From July 1900 to February 1901, he served as Interior Minister under the Conservatives' Petre P. Carp. This government proposed a series of measures to solve an ongoing financial crisis; its unpopular decisions provoked social tensions. A law on distilled spirits provoked outright revolt in eight counties, mainly in northern Oltenia and Muntenia. As minister, Olănescu was responsible for maintaining public order.

Olănescu served two terms as President of the Assembly: from June 1899 to September 1900, and from March 1911 to October 1912. During his time at the helm, important national-security and economic legislation was adopted. In the first period, these dealt with the Gendarmerie and the Army. Among those approved in his second term were laws on reducing the cost of living, antitrust, tax relief for the urban poor, industry promotion, mortmain and higher education.

In the autumn of 1915, Olănescu belonged to the leadership of the Unionist Federation, an organization that advocated the entry of neutral Romania into World War I, in order to unite all ethnic Romanians into a single state. In August 1916, as a former Assembly president, he took part in a Crown Council meeting where he voted in favor of joining the war on the Allies' side. In May 1918, he was among the Romanians living in Paris who signed a document denouncing the Treaty of Bucharest, through which Germany imposed a harsh peace on Romania. He died in Bucharest ten years later.
