= Basile M. Missir =

Romanian lawyer and politician

Basile Missir
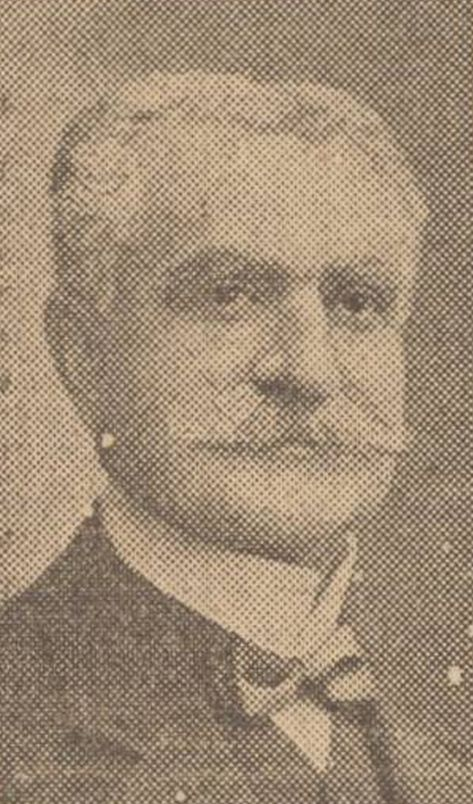

President of the Senate of Romania
- In office 21 February 1914 – 9 December 1916
- Monarchs: Carol I of Romania, Ferdinand I of Romania
- Preceded by: Ioan Lahovary
- Succeeded by: Emanoil Porumbaru

President of the Assembly of Deputies
- In office 15 December 1909 – 16 February 1910
- Monarch: Carol I of Romania
- Preceded by: Mihail Pherekyde
- Succeeded by: Mihail Pherekyde

Personal details
- Born: July 17, 1843 Focșani, Moldavia
- Died: April 21, 1929 (aged 85) Bucharest, Kingdom of Romania

Basile M. Missir (17 July 1843 – 21 April 1929) was a Romanian lawyer and politician.

== Early life ==
Born in Focșani, he came from a prominent Armenian family that included Petru Th. Missir and Basile's nephew Ioan Missir. He enrolled in the law faculty of Iași University in 1860, later earning his degree from the University of Paris. Entering the magistracy, he became a prosecutor in 1869 and chief prosecutor later the same year, at the Ilfov County tribunal in Bucharest. In 1870, he was hired as a prosecutor at the appeals court in the same city. From 1872 to 1874, no longer a magistrate, he was state's attorney at the High Court of Cassation and Justice.

== Political activity ==
After joining the National Liberal Party, he was Prefect of Brăila County from 1877 to 1878. From 1880 to 1889, he was state's attorney for the Bucharest tribunals. In 1896, he entered the dissident drapelist faction, but rejoined the main party in 1899. Meanwhile, he was elected to the Assembly of Deputies in 1897. From February 1901 to July 1902, he was Agriculture and Domains Minister under Dimitrie Sturdza. He initiated a 1902 law regulating labor relations, particularly in small industry. He served as Assembly president from December 1909 to February 1910. Two important laws were adopted during this period: one banned many categories of workers from striking, while another established popular banks. In 1914, he rose to the Senate, where he also served as president from that February until December 1916.

== Family ==
His wife came from the boyar Vrăbiescu family; the couple's daughter Julietta married Scarlat Cantacuzino in 1912.
