= Grigore Trandafil =

Wallachian-born Romanian magistrate & politician (1840–1907)

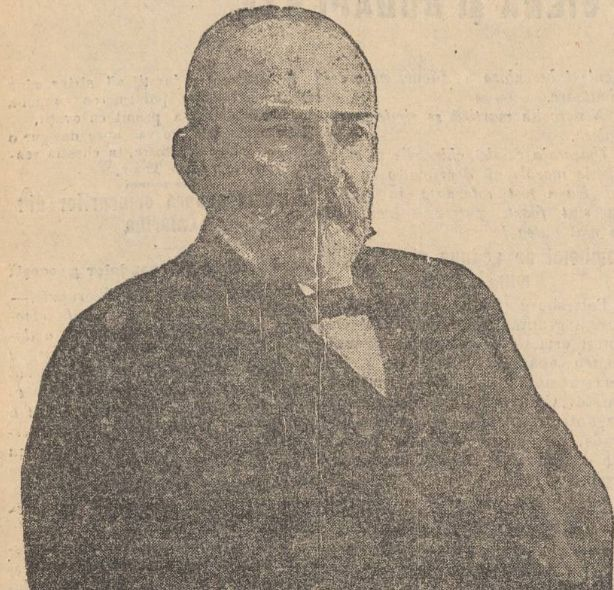
Grigore Triandafil (or Georges Trandafil, 1840–1907) was a Romanian magistrate, doctor of law, lawyer, politician and minister.

Grigore Trandafil (February 4, 1840–February 23, 1907) was a Wallachian-born Romanian magistrate and politician.

Born in Bucharest, he studied law at the University of Paris, obtaining a doctorate. After returning home, he entered the magistracy, where he was successively prosecutor, president of the Ilfov County tribunal, department head in the Justice Ministry (1866), general prosecutor (1867), president of the Bucharest appeals court (1868) and prosecutor at the High Court of Cassation and Justice (1872).

Trandafil joined an early conservative association in 1878, and entered the Conservative Party after it was founded in 1880. A close associate of Lascăr Catargiu, he was first elected to the Assembly of Deputies in 1879. Trandafil was Justice Minister in the cabinet of Gheorghe Manu from November 1890 to February 1891. He served as mayor of Bucharest from June 1892 until the following February. He was Assembly President from February 1905 until his death two years later. Many laws were adopted during his presidency, some of them aiming to improve villagers' material situation, but the measures failed to prevent the 1907 Peasants' Revolt.
