= Ștefan C. Șendrea =

European jurist and politician

Ștefan C. Șendrea (1842–July 30, 1907) was a Moldavian, later Romanian jurist and politician.

Born in Huși, Șendrea obtained a doctorate in law from the University of Paris and one in political and administrative sciences from the Free University of Brussels. After returning to Romania, he secured a position as professor at the law faculty of the University of Iași in 1867, transferring to the University of Bucharest in 1897. He entered politics at Iași, joining the Free and Independent Faction in 1869, later adhering to the National Liberal Party (PNL). He was a diplomatic agent at Paris from October 1876 to April 1877, in the run-up to international recognition of Romania's independence. He was first elected Senator in 1879 and Deputy in 1884, taking part in a number of Liberal as well as Conservative legislatures. Șendrea served as Justice Minister in the Petre S. Aurelian cabinet, from November 1896 to March 1897. He was awarded the Order of the Star of Romania in the rank of Commander (April 1887) and the Order of the Crown of Romania in the rank of Grand Officer (April 1897). After the Aurelian cabinet fell, he joined the drapelist faction, but re-entered the main PNL in 1899. He was President of the Chamber of Deputies from December 9 to 23, 1904. He committed suicide by jumping out of a train along the Budapest–Vienna line.
