= Gheorghe Rosnovanu =

Romanian politician (1834–1904)

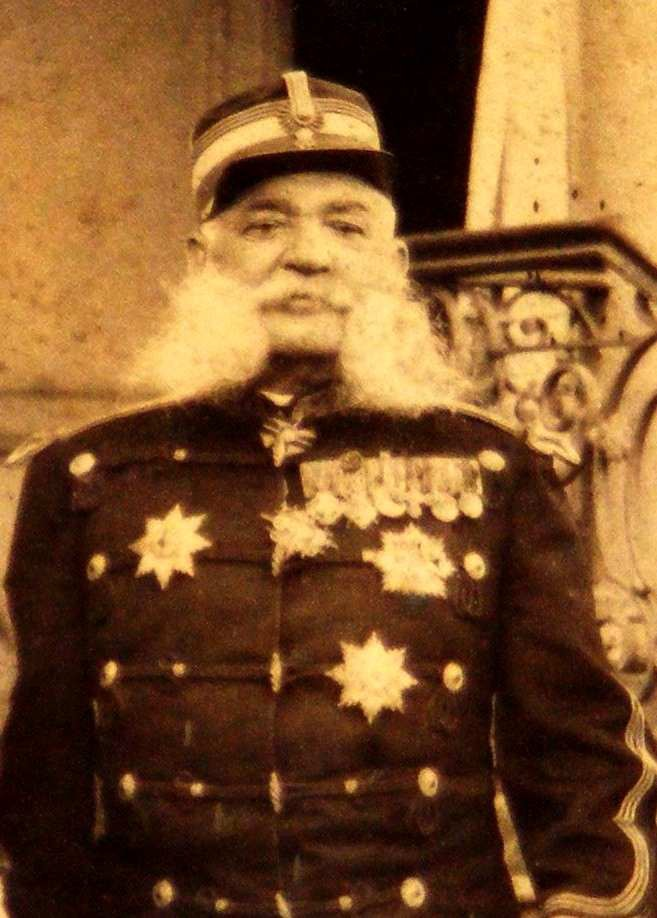
Gheorghe Ruset Rosnovanu, c. 1890

Gheorghe Rosnovanu or Gheorghe Ruset Roznovanu (March 1, 1834–October 2, 1904) was a Moldavian-born Romanian soldier and politician.

He was born in Roznov in 1834 (other sources put the date at 1832). A scion of the Moldavian boyar Rosetti family, his parents were hetman Alexandru Rosnovanu and his wife Ruxandra Callimachi. After finishing home-schooling schooling, he completed his secondary studies in Paris, where he passed the Baccalauréat. At age 17, he was sent to Saint Petersburg, where he trained at the cadet school, and then entered the Imperial Russian Army, later serving under the command of Grand Duke Sergei Alexandrovich. Rosnovanu served there until the end of the Crimean War, when he returned to Moldavia and entered the Moldavian Army as a second lieutenant in 1857. He advanced to major in 1858 and resigned as a colonel in 1863 from what was now the Romanian Army. In 1862, he married Alexandrina Câmpineanu, the daughter of Ion Câmpineanu; the two had a son, Alexandru (1863–1883).

A conservative, he belonged to the constituent assembly of 1866, and was first elected to the Assembly of Deputies in 1867. Returned to active service in 1869, he was for a time prefect of Neamț County until 1876. He then practiced as a lawyer. Rosnovanu participated in the Romanian War of Independence. In 1879, he was elected to the Senate. He left the army for good in 1884. From May to December 1891, he was Assembly President. Rosnovanu died in Bucharest.

A high school in Roznov bears his name.
