= Progressive Conservative Party (Romania) =

Progressive Conservative Party Partidul Conservator-Progresist
- Founded: 1918
- Dissolved: 1925
- Split from: Conservative Party
- Merged into: People's Party
- Ideology: Progressive conservatism
- Political position: Centre-right

The Progressive Conservative Party (Romanian: Partidul Conservator-Progresist, PCP) was a political party in Romania.

== History ==
The party was established as a result of a split in the Conservative Party. In the 1919 elections it won 13 seats in the Chamber of Deputies and four in the Senate. However, it did not contest any further elections. The PCP merged into the People's Party in 1925.

== Election results ==
=== Legislative elections ===
Election	Votes	%	Assembly	Senate	Position
1919			13 / 568	4 / 216	7th
