= Crown Council of Romania =

Advisors to Romanian king

Royal Crown Council of Romania
- Consiliul Regal a Romaniei
- Formation: 1 October 2010
- Legal status: Advisory body
- Members: Members of the Council
- Head: Margareta of Romania (Queen-in-Council)
- Website: consiliul-regal.ro

The Crown Council (Romanian: Consiliul de Coroană) was an institution that advised the King of Romania. Informal between 1866 and 1938, it was formalized by the 1938 Constitution, in effect for two years. The forum met on occasions of great national importance. It had a purely advisory role, and was convoked by the King on the government's advice.

In 2010, the council was once again re-established by King Michael I on October 10, which succeeded the Political and Advisory Committee set up by the King during his exile and after 1989 Romanian Revolution.

== List of Crown Councils ==
The Crown Councils that took place and the issues discussed were the following:

Date	Reason	King
2 April 1877	Entry into the Romanian War of Independence	Carol I
21 July 1914	Approval of Romania's neutrality at the beginning of World War I	Carol I
14 August 1916	Approval of Romania's entry into the First World War	Ferdinand I
17–19 February 1918	Approval of the start of peace negotiations with the Central Powers	Ferdinand I
31 December 1925	Took note of the abdication of Prince Carol	Ferdinand I
9 April 1937	The exclusion of Prince Nicholas from the royal family	Carol II
17 March 1939	Discussion of the situation created by the occupation of Czechoslovakia	Carol II
6 September 1939	Approval of Romania's neutrality at the beginning of World War II	Carol II
27 June 1940	Approval of the Soviet ultimatum on Bessarabia	Carol II
23 August 1940	Discussion of negotiations with Hungary on Transylvania	Carol II
30 August 1940	Approval of the arbitration offer made by Germany and Italy regarding Transylvania	Carol II
31 August 1940	Took note of the content of the Vienna Dictate	Carol II

== Institutionalization of the Crown Council ==
At the beginning of 1938, King Carol II decided to abolish the parliamentary regime and established a regime of personal authority, enshrined in law by drafting, approving by plebiscite and then promulgating a new Constitution. Several measures were taken to reorganize the state, which included: censorship, suspension of the immovability of magistrates and the stability of civil servants, dissolution of political parties, creation of a "mass" party (National Renaissance Front), professional organization in guilds, reform administrative etc.

Against this background, on March 30, 1938, a decree-law was issued establishing the Crown Council as a distinct political organism. According to the decree-law, the members of the council were to be appointed by royal decree, from current or former dignitaries of the state, church, army and royal court or from prominent personalities of the country, the number of members not being limited. The Council maintained its consultative status.

== Members ==
=== Historical members ===
The members of the Council bore the title of royal adviser, and received a monthly allowance of 50,000 lei. These were the following (those for whom the date is not specified were appointed on 30 March 1938):

- Former Prime Ministers didn't become Crown Councillors for different reasons; Barbu Știrbey (1927), was vetoed by King Carol II and Iuliu Maniu and Octavian Goga (1937–1938) refused to serve.

Crown Councillors
Image	Name	Dates		Portfolio	PM
	Patriarch Miron (1868–1939)	30 March 1938	6 March 1939	Patriarch 1919–1939	1938–1939
	Mareșal Alexandru Averescu (1859–1938)	30 March 1938	30 October 1938		1918; 1920–1921; 1926–1927
	General Artur Văitoianu (1864–1956)	30 March 1938	6 September 1940		1919
	Alexandru Vaida-Voevod (1872–1950)	30 March 1938	6 September 1940		1919–1920; 1932; 1933
	Gheorghe Mironescu (1874–1949)	30 March 1938	6 September 1940		1930; 1930–1931
	Nicolae Iorga (1871–1940)	30 March 1938	6 September 1940		1931–1932
	Constantin Angelescu (1869–1948)	30 March 1938	6 September 1940		1933–1934
	Gheorghe Tătărescu (1886–1957)	30 March 1938	6 September 1940		1934–1937; 1939–1940
	Constantin Argetoianu (1871–1955)	30 March 1938	6 September 1940		1939
	Mareșal Constantin Prezan (1861–1943)	30 March 1938	6 September 1940		
	General Ernest Ballif (1871–1940)	30 March 1938	6 September 1940		
	A. C. Cuza (1857–1947)	16 June 1939	6 September 1940		
	Victor Iamandi (1891–1940)	23 November 1939	6 September 1940		
	Ion Mihalache (1882–1963)	17 April 1940	26 June 1940		
	Victor Antonescu (1871–1947)	18 April 1940	6 September 1940		
	Patriarch Nicodim (1864–1948)	20 August 1940	6 September 1940	Patriarch 1939–1948	
	Nicolae Bălan (1882–1955)	20 August 1940	6 September 1940		
	Alexandru Nicolescu (1882–1941)	20 August 1940	6 September 1940		

- Metropolitan of Transylvania Nicolae Bălan, from August 20, 1940
- Metropolitan of the Romanian Church United with Rome, Greek-Catholic Alexandru Nicolescu, from August 20, 1940.

==== 2010–2017 ====
- HRH Crown Princess Margareta of Romania
- HRH Prince Radu of Romania
- HIRH Archduke Lorenz of Austria, Prince of Belgium
- Mr Andrew Popper, President of the Royal Council
- Master Adrian Vasiliu
- Dr Jonathan Eyal
- Mr Guy Pochelon
- HE Ambassador Mihnea Constantinescu (October 2010 – December 2015)
- Mr Anders Lindberg – Sweden (since January 2015)
- Dr Anneli Ute Gabanyi (since January 2016)
- Lawyer Dr Ioan-Luca Vlad, Secretary of the Council

=== Current members (2018-today) ===
- HRH Princess Helena of Romania
- HRH Princess Sophie of Romania (since November 2024)
- HIRH Archduke Lorenz of Austria, Prince of Belgium
- Mr Andrew Popper, President of the Royal Council
- Master Adrian Vasiliu
- Dr Jonathan Eyal
- Dr Anneli Ute Gabanyi
- Lawyer Dr Ioan-Luca Vlad

== See also ==
- Privy council

== Bibliography ==
- Ion Mamina, Consilii de Coroană, Editura Enciclopedică, București, 1997
