= Manolache Costache Epureanu =

Romanian politician (1823–1880)

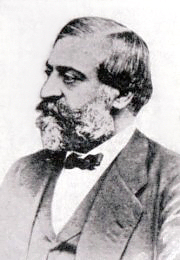
Manolache Costache Epureanu

Manolache Costache Epureanu (Romanian pronunciation: [manoˈlake koˈstake epuˈre̯anu]; 1823–1880) was twice the Prime Minister of Romania both as a representative of the Conservative Party and of the National Liberal Party, more specifically for the first time in 1870 (20 April–14 December) and for the second time in 1876 (6 May–5 August).

== Biography ==
Born in Bârlad, Moldavia, he studied in Heidelberg, Germany and returned to Moldavia to participate in the 1848 revolutionary movement, being part of the ad hoc committee.

In 1866, he was the president of the council which decided to invite a foreign dynasty to rule Romania. In 1871, during the Lascăr Catargiu conservative government, Epureanu was the Minister of Justice between October 1872 and March 1873. He then switched to the opposition and in 1876, he was a national liberal Prime Minister, but later he switched again to the Conservative Party.

He published Chestia locuitorilor privită din punctul de vedere al Regulamentului organic (1866) and Despre pretinsa rescumpărare a căilor ferate (1879).

He was the father of Elena Bibescu. He died in Schlangenbad, Duchy of Nassau, which is now in Germany.
