= First Nicolae Kretzulescu cabinet =

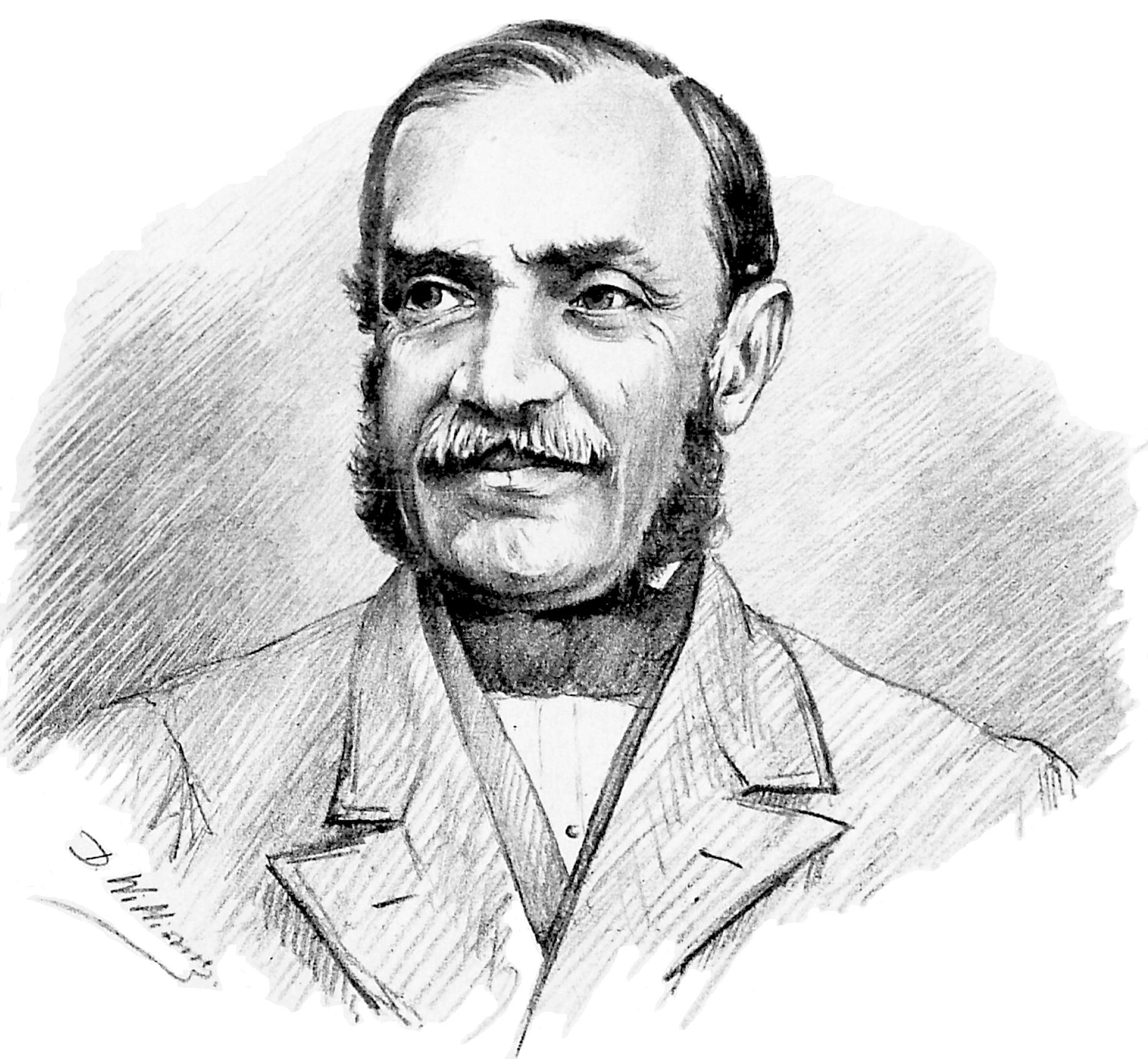
Nicolae Kretzulescu

The first cabinet of Nicolae Kretzulescu was the government of Romania from 24 June 1862 to 11 October 1863.

== Composition ==
The ministers of the cabinet were as follows:

- President of the Council of Ministers:

- Nicolae Kretzulescu (24 June 1862 - 11 October 1863)

- Minister of the Interior:

- Nicolae Kretzulescu (24 June 1862 - 11 October 1863)

- Minister of Foreign Affairs:

- Alexandru Cantacuzino (24 June - 30 September 1862)
- Gen. Ioan Grigore Ghica (30 September 1862 - 17 August 1863)
- Nicolae Rosetti-Bălănescu (17 August - 11 October 1863)

- Minister of Finance:

- Teodor Ghica (24 June - 12 July 1862)
- (interim) Alexandru Cantacuzino (12 July - 30 September 1862)
- Alexandru Cantacuzino (30 September 1862 - 16 March 1863)
- (interim) Constantin I. Iliescu (16 March - 31 July 1863)
- Constantin I. Iliescu (31 July - 11 October 1863)

- Minister of Justice:

- Dimitrie Cornea (24 June - 30 December 1862)
- Nicolae Kretzulescu (30 December 1862 - 14 June 1863)
- Barbu Bellu (14 June - 8 August 1863)
- (interim) Nicolae Kretzulescu (8 - 15 August 1863)
- Dimitrie P. Vioreanu (15 August - 11 October 1863)

- Minister of Religious Affairs:

- Gheorghe Crețeanu (24 June - 16 July 1862)
- Nicolae D. Racoviță (16 July - 30 December 1862)
- Gen. Christian Tell (30 December 1862 - 26 May 1863)
- (interim) Alexandru Odobescu (26 May - 31 July 1863)
- Alexandru Odobescu (31 July - 11 October 1863)

- Minister of War:

- Gen. Ioan Grigore Ghica (24 June - 30 September 1862)
- Gen. Ioan Emanoil Florescu (30 September 1862 - 11 October 1863)

- Minister of Public Works:

- Alexandru Em. Florescu (24 June - 7 July 1862)
- (interim) Dimitrie Cornea (7 July - 11 October 1862)
- Alexandru Ștefan Catargiu (11 October 1862 - 11 October 1863)

- Minister of Control:

- Alexandru Ștefan Catargiu (24 June - 11 October 1862)

Preceded by Barbu Catargiu cabinet	Cabinet of Romania; 24 June 1862 - 11 October 1863	Succeeded by Kogălniceanu cabinet
