= Barbu Catargiu cabinet =

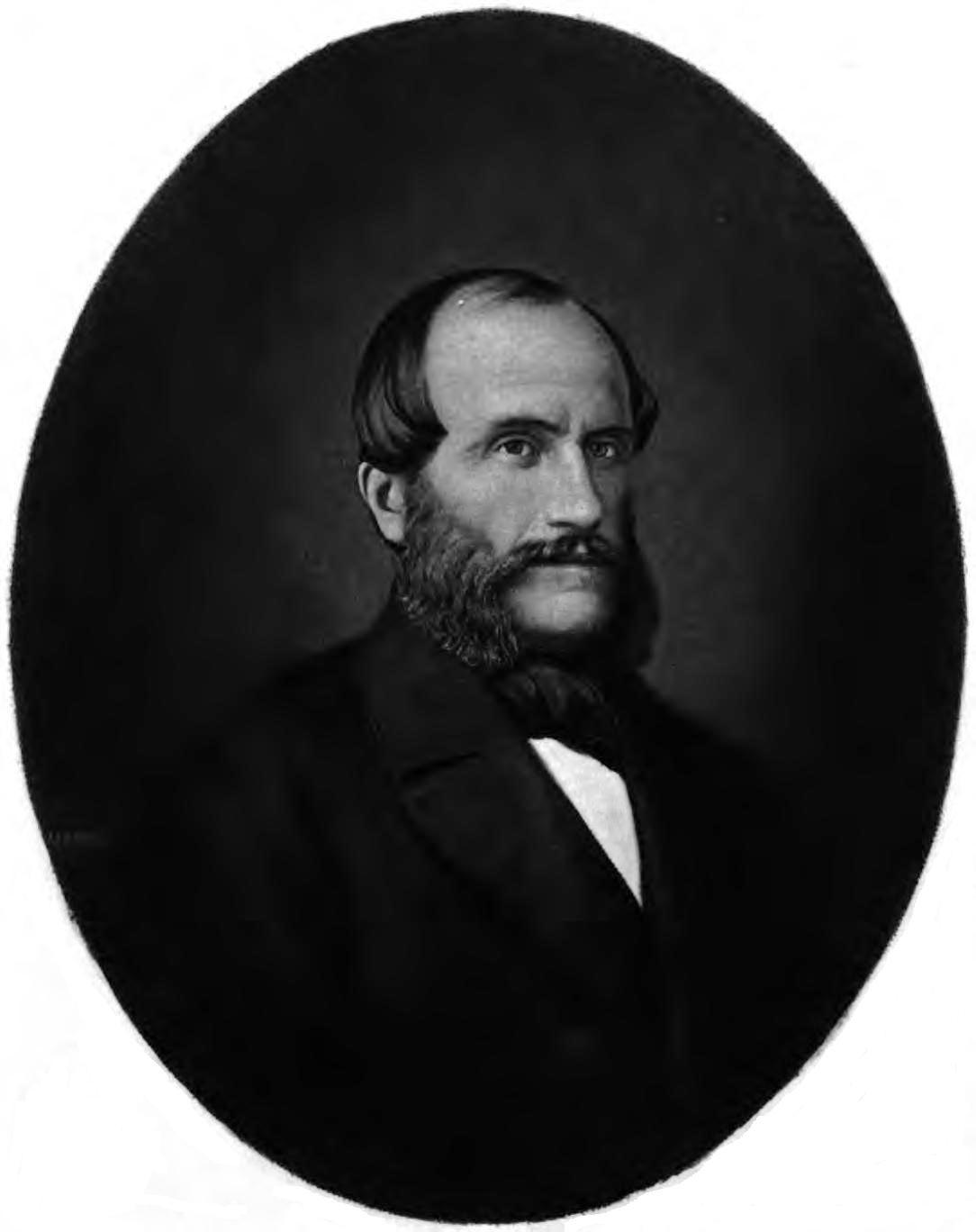
Barbu Catargiu

The cabinet of Barbu Catargiu was the first government of the United Principalities of Romania after the formal union of Wallachia with Moldavia and lasted from 22 January to 24 June 1862. Prime Minister Barbu Catargiu was assassinated on 8 June and the government collapsed soon thereafter.

== Composition ==
The ministers of the cabinet were as follows:

- President of the Council of Ministers:

- Barbu Catargiu (22 January - 8 June 1862)
- (interim) Apostol Arsache (8 - 24 June 1862)

- Minister of the Interior:

- Barbu Catargiu (22 January - 8 June 1862)
- (interim) Apostol Arsache (8 - 24 June 1862)

- Minister of Foreign Affairs:

- Apostol Arsache (22 January - 24 June 1862)

- Minister of Finance:

- Alexandru C. Moruzi (22 - 27 January 1862)
- Grigore Balș (27 January - 11 March 1862)
- Alexandru Catargiu (11 - 24 March 1862)
- Teodor Ghica (24 March - 24 June 1862)

- Minister of Justice:

- Constantin N. Brăiloiu (22 January - 7 June 1862)
- Dimitrie Cornea (7 - 24 June 1862)

- Minister of Religious Affairs:

- Grigore Balș (22 January - 7 February 1862)
- Barbu Bellu (7 February - 24 June 1862)

- Minister of War:5

- Gen. Ioan Grigore Ghica (22 January - 24 June 1862)

- Minister of Public Works:

- (interim) Barbu Catargiu (22 - 27 January 1862)
- Dimitrie Cornea (27 January - 7 June 1862)
- (interim) Alexandru Em. Florescu (7 - 24 June 1862)

- Minister of Control:

- Alexandru Em. Florescu (24 March - 24 June 1862)

| Preceded by Government of Wallachia; Government of Moldavia | Cabinet of Romania; 22 January 1862 - 24 June 1862 | Succeeded by First Nicolae Kretzulescu cabinet |
