= Second Nicolae Kretzulescu cabinet =

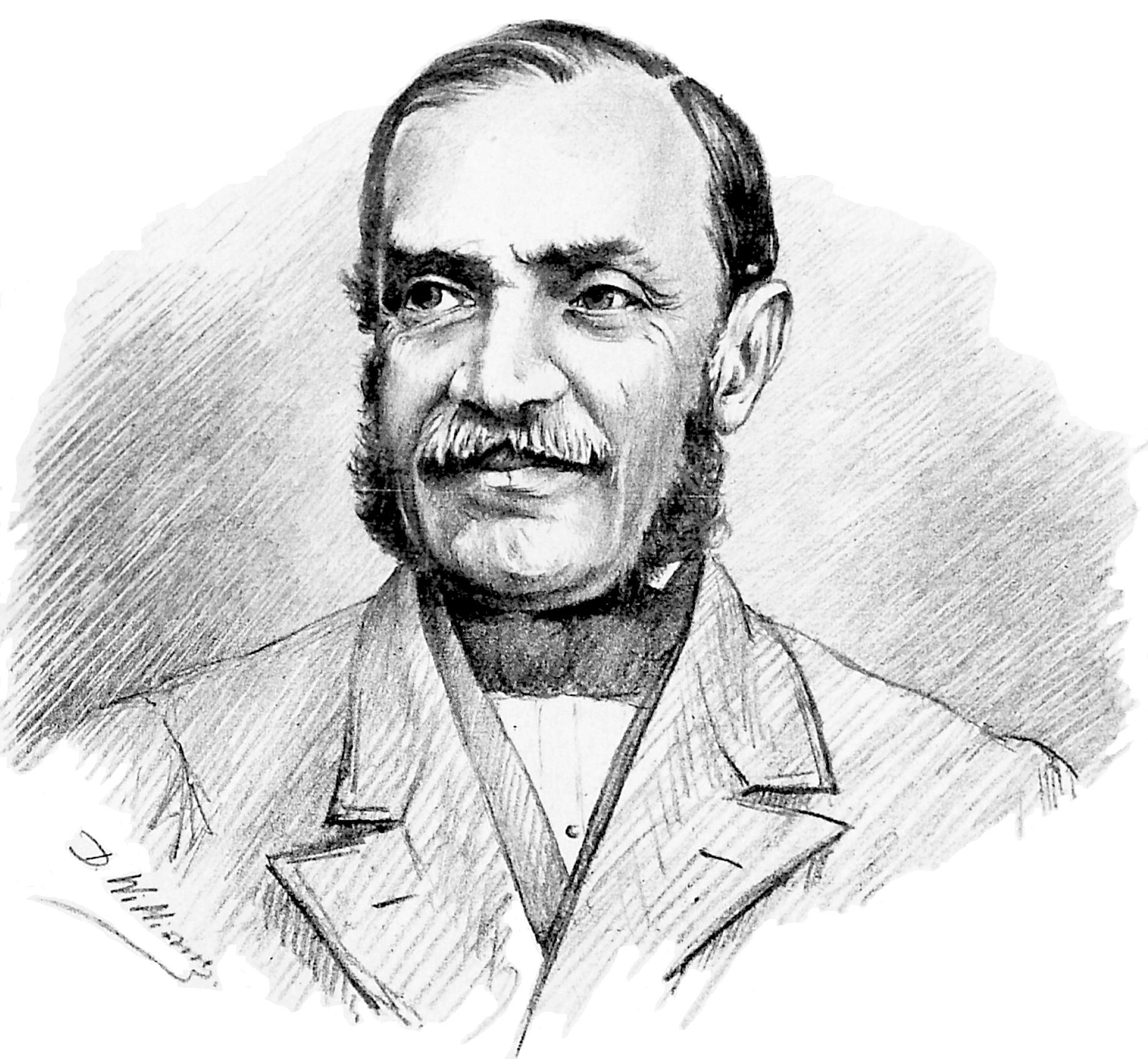
Nicolae Kretzulescu

The second cabinet of Nicolae Kretzulescu was the government of Romania from 14 June 1865 to 11 February 1866.

== Composition ==
The ministers of the cabinet were as follows:

- President of the Council of Ministers:

- Nicolae Kretzulescu (14 June 1865 - 11 February 1866)

- Minister of the Interior, Agriculture, and Public Works:

- Gen. Ioan Emanoil Florescu (14 June 1865 - 30 January 1866)
- Nicolae Kretzulescu (30 January - 11 February 1866)

- Minister of Foreign Affairs:

- Nicolae Rosetti-Bălănescu (14 June - 2 October 1865)
- Grigore Bengescu (2 - 3 October 1865)
- (interim) Gen. Savel Manu (3 - 17 October 1865)
- Alexandru Papadopol-Calimah (17 October 1865 - 11 February 1866)

- Minister of Finance:

- Nicolae Kretzulescu (14 June 1865 - 30 January 1866)
- Ioan Oteteleșeanu (30 January - 11 February 1866)

- Minister of Justice and Religious Affairs:

- (interim) Dimitrie Cariagdi (14 - 27 June 1865)
- Dimitrie Cariagdi (27 June 1865 - 11 February 1866)

- Minister of War:

- Gen. Savel Manu (14 June 1865 - 30 January 1866)
- Col. Alexandru Solomon (30 January - 11 February 1866)

- Minister of Control:

- (interim) Nicolae Rosetti-Bălănescu (14 - 17 June 1865)
- (interim) Gen. Savel Manu (17 June -23 August 1865)

Preceded by Bosianu cabinet	Cabinet of Romania; 14 June 1865 - 11 February 1866	Succeeded by First Ion Ghica cabinet
