= Second Lascăr Catargiu cabinet =

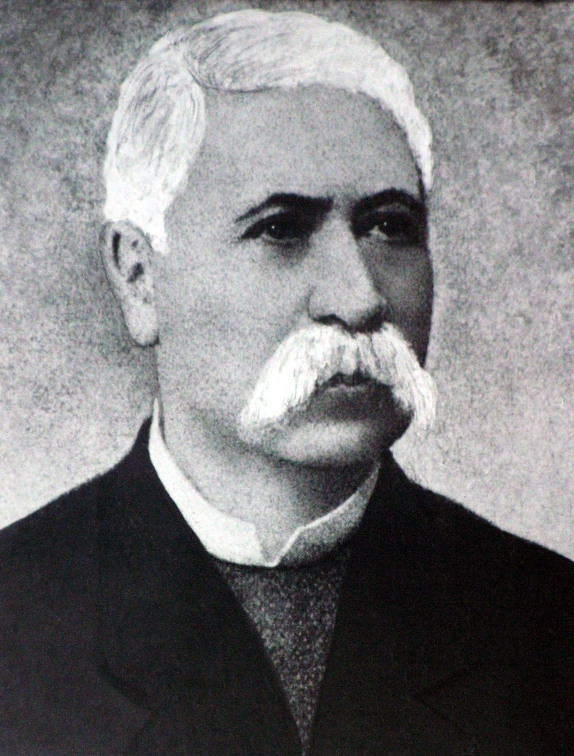
Lascăr Catargiu

The second cabinet of Lascăr Catargiu was the government of Romania from 11 March 1871 to 30 March 1876.

== Composition ==
The ministers of the cabinet were as follows:

- President of the Council of Ministers:

- Lascăr Catargiu (11 March 1871 - 30 March 1876)

- Minister of the Interior:

- Lascăr Catargiu (11 March 1871 - 30 March 1876)

- Minister of Foreign Affairs:

- Gheorghe Costaforu (11 March 1871 - 27 April 1873)
- (interim) Lascăr Catargiu (27 - 28 April 1873)
- Vasile Boerescu (28 April 1873 - 7 November 1875)
- (interim) Lascăr Catargiu (7 November 1875 - 30 January 1876)
- Ion Bălăceanu (30 January - 30 March 1876)

- Minister of Finance:

- Petre Mavrogheni (11 March 1871 - 7 January 1875)
- Gheorghe Grigore Cantacuzino (7 January 1875 - 30 January 1876)
- Ion Strat (30 January - 30 March 1876)

- Minister of Justice:

- Nicolae Kretzulescu (11 March 1871 - 28 October 1872)
- Manolache Costache Epureanu (28 October 1872 - 31 March 1873)
- (interim) Gen. Christian Tell (31 March - 25 October 1873)
- Alexandru Lahovary (25 October 1873 - 30 March 1876)

- Minister of War:

- Gen. Christian Tell (11 - 14 March 1871)
- Gen. Ioan Emanoil Florescu (14 March 1871 - 30 March 1876)

- Minister of Religious Affairs and Public Instruction:

- (interim) Gheorghe Costaforu (11 - 14 March 1871)
- Gen. Christian Tell (14 March 1871 - 9 January 1874)
- (interim) Vasile Boerescu (9 January - 7 April 1874)
- Titu Maiorescu (7 April 1874 - 30 January 1876)
- Petre P. Carp (30 January - 30 March 1876)

- Minister of Public Works:

- (interim) Nicolae Kretzulescu (11 March - 8 June 1871)
- Nicolae Kretzulescu (8 June 1871 - 16 December 1873)
- Gheorghe Grigore Cantacuzino (16 December 1873 - 7 January 1875)
- Theodor Rosetti (7 January 1875 - 31 March 1876)
- (interim) Alexandru Lahovary (31 March - 4 April 1876)

Preceded by Third Ion Ghica cabinet	Cabinet of Romania; 11 March 1871 - 30 March 1876	Succeeded by First Florescu cabinet
