= Kogălniceanu cabinet =

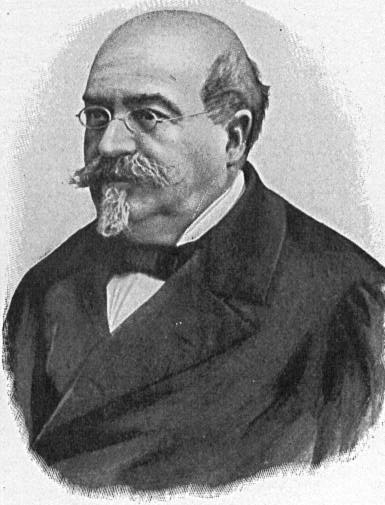
Mihail Kogălniceanu

The cabinet of Mihail Kogălniceanu was the government of Romania from 11 October 1863 to 26 January 1865.

== Composition ==
The ministers of the cabinet were as follows:

- President of the Council of Ministers:

- Mihail Kogălniceanu (11 October 1863 - 26 January 1865)

- Minister of the Interior:

- Mihail Kogălniceanu (11 October 1863 - 26 January 1865)

- Minister of Public Works:

- Petre Orbescu (11 October 1863 - 6 May 1864)
- (interim) Mihail Kogălniceanu (6 May - 19 July 1864)

- Minister of the Interior, Agriculture, and Public Works:

- Mihail Kogălniceanu (19 July 1864 - 26 January 1865)

- Minister of Foreign Affairs:

- Nicolae Rosetti-Bălănescu (11 October 1863 - 26 January 1865)

- Minister of Finance:

- Ludovic Steege (11 October 1863 - 21 January 1865)
- (interim) Nicolae Rosetti-Bălănescu (21 - 26 January 1865)

- Minister of Justice :

- Alexandru Papiu Ilarian (11 October 1863 - 27 February 1864)
- (interim) Petre Orbescu (27 February - 6 May 1864)
- Petre Orbescu (6 May - 19 July 1864)

- Minister of Religious Affairs:

- Dimitrie Bolintineanu (11 October 1863 - 19 July 1864)

- Minister of Justice and Culture :

- Nicolae Kretzulescu (19 July 1864 - 21 January 1865)
- Grigore Bengescu (21 - 26 January 1865)

- Minister of War:

- Gen. Alexandru Iacovache (11 October 1863 - 12 April 1864)
- Gen. Savel Manu (12 April 1864 - 26 January 1865)

- Minister of Control:

- (interim) Alexandru Papiu Ilarian (11 October 1863 - 27 February 1864)
- (interim) Nicolae Rosetti-Bălănescu (27 February 1864 - 26 January 1865)

Preceded by First Nicolae Kretzulescu cabinet	Cabinet of Romania; 11 October 1863 - 26 January 1865	Succeeded by Bosianu cabinet
