= Apostol Arsache =

Greek-Romanian politician and philanthropist

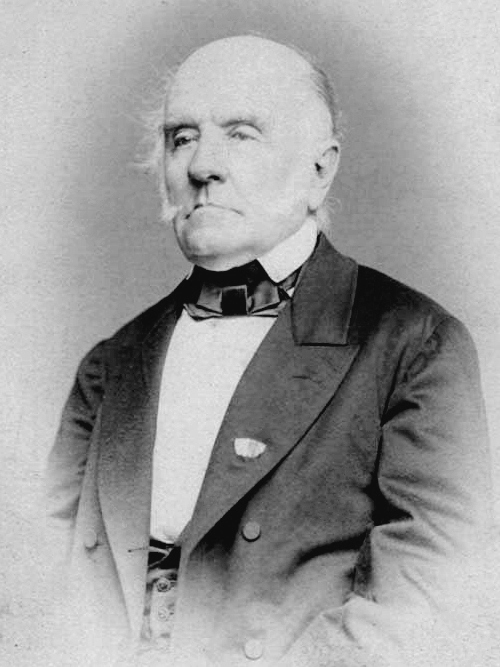

Minister of Foreign Affairs
- In office 22 January 1862 – 24 June 1862
- Preceded by: office established
- Succeeded by: Alexandru Cantacuzino

acting Prime Minister of Romania
- In office 8 June 1862 – 23 June 1862
- Monarch: Alexandru Ioan Cuza
- Preceded by: Barbu Catargiu
- Succeeded by: Nicolae Kretzulescu

Personal details
- Born: 6 January 1789 Hotovë, Vilayet of Yannina, Ottoman Empire
- Died: 16 March 1874 (aged 85) Arsache, Romania
- Education: University of Halle-Wittenberg

Apostol Arsache (Romanian pronunciation: [aˈpostol arˈsake]) or Apostolos Arsakis (Greek: Απόστολος Αρσάκης; Greek pronunciation: [aˈpostolos arˈsacis]; 1789 – 1869) was a Greek-Romanian politician and philanthropist. He was one of the major benefactors of 19th-century Greece, while at the same time he became a leading political figure in Romania.

== Life ==
Arsache was born in the village of Hotovë, Përmet District, modern southern Albania, then in Ottoman Empire. He was of either Albanian, Aromanian or Greek descent. In 1800, Arsache moved together with his family to Vienna, there he was educated in a school of the local Greek diaspora. Among his teachers was Neophytos Doukas, prominent figure of the modern Greek Enlightenment. At 1807 Doukas published an epigram composed by Arsache about the work, Breviarium historiae Romanae, of historian Eutropius. He then went to the University of Halle and studied medicine. Arsache composed a treatise under the title Ἔκθεσις συνοπτικὴ τῆς Ἰατρικῆς ἱστορίας (Coincise Report of the History of Medicine) in Ancient Greek, which was published at the Greek periodical Hermes o Logios, in Vienna. At 1807 he published his thesis De Piscium Celebro et Medulla Spinali in Latin.

In 1814 he moved to Bucharest, Romania. In the Cabinet of Barbu Catargiu (22 January to 24 June 1862), he served as Minister of Foreign Affairs and following Catargiu's assassination on 20 June, Arsache briefly served as interim Prime Minister of Romania.

== Contribution to Greece ==
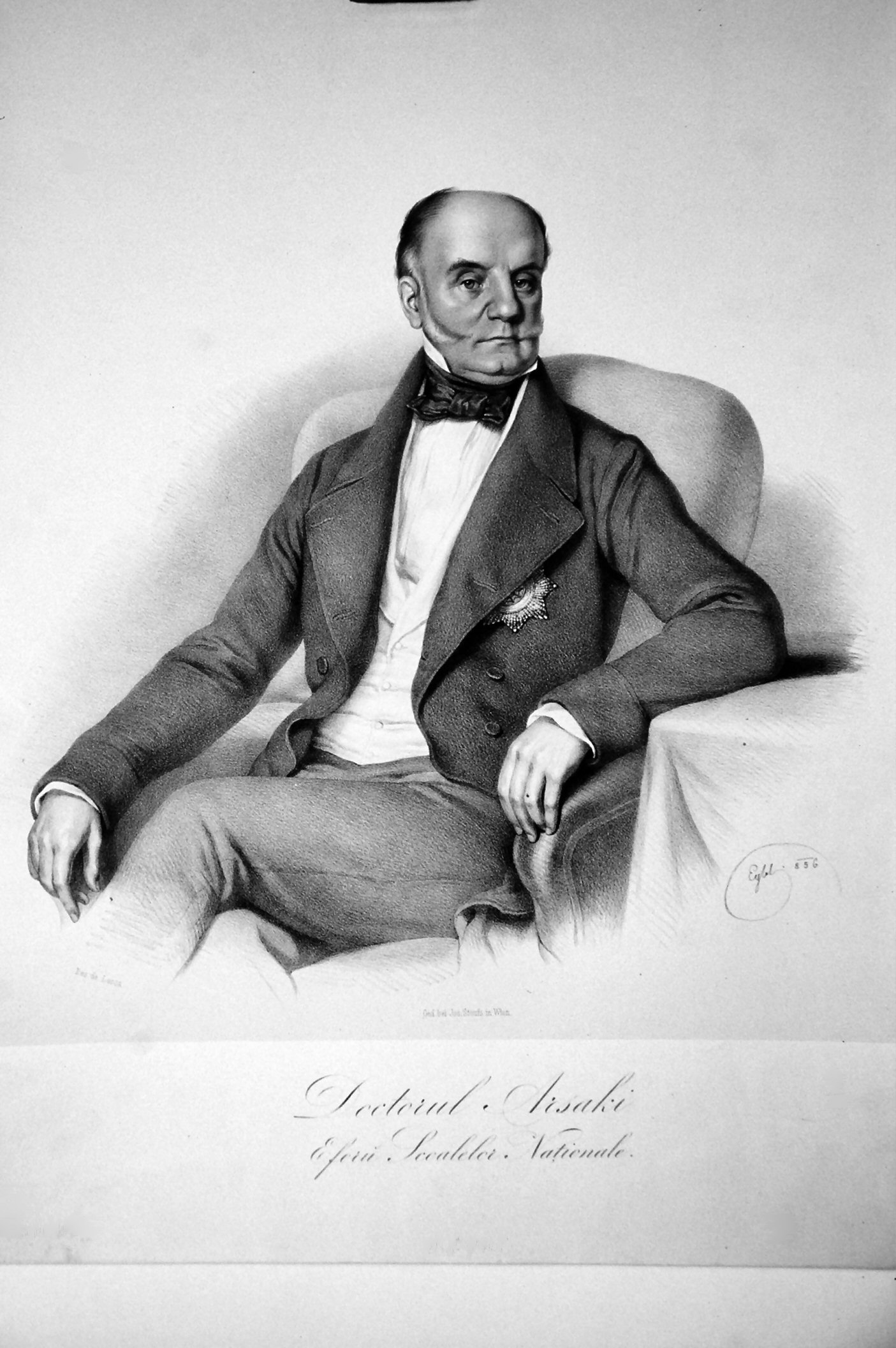
Apostol Arsache in 1856

He became one of the major benefactors of the newly established Greek state. In 1850 he offered large sums of money for the establishment of a female educational institutions in the Greek capital, Athens, housed in a luxurious mansions at the city center. Arsache donated a total of 600,000 golden drachmas for this purpose. This institution bore the name Arsakeio after him. Because of his initiative the Greek Parliament gave him honorary Greek citizenship. However, he refused to swear the oath, due to his political career in his new country. He also managed to build a school in his home town in 1870.
