= First Florescu cabinet =

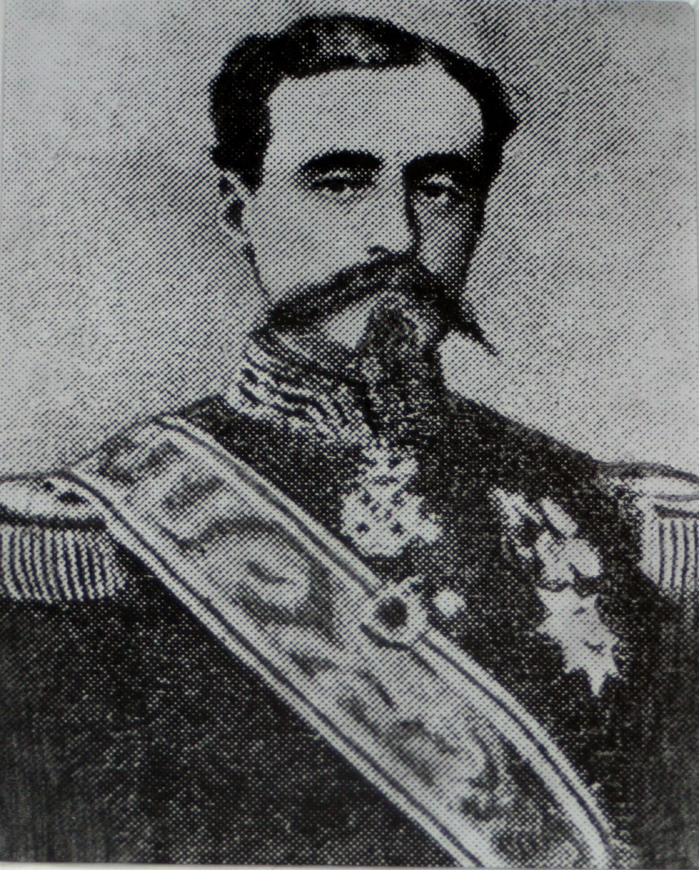
Ioan Emanoil Florescu

The first cabinet of Ioan Emanoil Florescu was the government of Romania from 4 April to 26 April 1876.

== Composition ==
Cabinet ministers were:

- President of the Council of Ministers:

- Gen. Ioan Emanoil Florescu (4 April - 26 April 1876)

- Minister of the Interior:

- Gen. Ioan Emanoil Florescu (4 April - 26 April 1876)

- Minister of Foreign Affairs:

- Dimitrie Cornea (4 April - 26 April 1876)

- Minister of Finance:

- Gen. Christian Tell (4 April - 26 April 1876)

- Minister of Justice:

- Dimitrie P. Vioreanu (4 - 24 April 1876)
- (interim) Dimitrie Cornea (24 - 26 April 1876)

- Minister of War:

- Gen. Ioan Emanoil Florescu (4 April - 26 April 1876)

- Minister of Religious Affairs and Public Instruction:

- Alexandru Orăscu (4 April - 26 April 1876)

- Minister of Public Works:

- Gen. Tobias Gherghely (4 April - 26 April 1876)

Preceded by Second Lascăr Catargiu cabinet	Cabinet of Romania; 4 April 1876 - 26 April 1876	Succeeded by Second Epureanu cabinet
