= Princess Cantacuzene =

Princess Cantacuzene may refer to:

- Princess Elsa Cantacuzene (née Elsa Bruckmann)
- Julia Dent Cantacuzène Spiransky-Grant (1876–1975), married to Prince Mikhail Cantacuzène
- Princess Kassandra Cantacuzene, mother of Antiochus Kantemir
- Princess Irina Cantacuzene (1895–1945) and Princess Olga Cantacuzene (1899–1983), granddaughters of Catherine Chislova
- Princess Marie Cantacuzène (1820–1898), Romanian model and wife of Pierre Puvis de Chavannes

See also:

- Cantacuzino family of Wallachia
