= Eustațiu =

Eustațiu is a Romanian male given name that may refer to:

- Eustațiu Pencovici
- Eustațiu Sebastian
  - Rear-Admiral Eustațiu Sebastian-class corvette
- Eustațiu Stoenescu
