= Catargiu =

Coat of arms of noble Catargiu family

The Catargiu family (Romanian pronunciation: [katarˈd͡ʒi.u]) is an influential Moldavian noble family of the Tupilați region, whose members played important political role in the history of Wallachia, Moldavia and Romania.

== Notable members ==
- Alexandru Ștefan Catargiu (1825 – 1897), a Romanian politician
- Barbu Catargiu (1807 – 1862), a conservative Romanian journalist and politician
- Eva Callimachi-Catargi (1855 –1913), Parisian heiress and subject of two paintings by Henri Fantin-Latour.
- Lascăr Catargiu (1823 – 1899), a Romanian conservative statesman from Moldavia
- Nicolae Calimachi-Catargiu (1830 – 1882), a conservative Romanian politician
- Elena Maria Catargiu-Obrenović (Serbian: Елена Марија Катарџи-Обреновић; 1831 – 1879), mother of King Milan I of Serbia

== See also ==
- Catargiu River, a tributary of the Jijioara River in Romania
