= Third Ion Ghica cabinet =

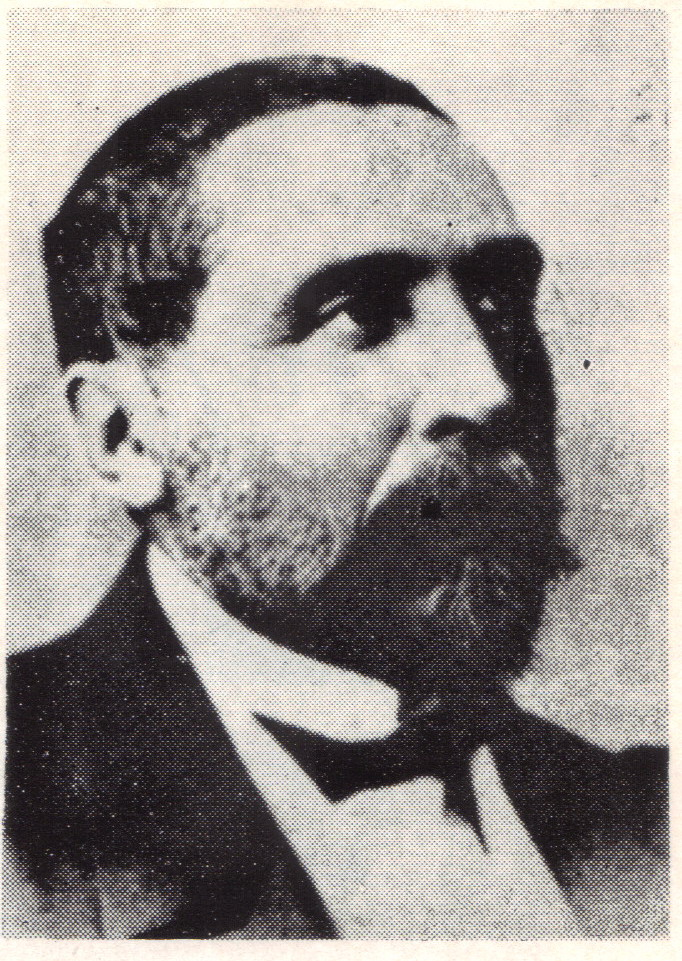
Ion Ghica

The third cabinet of Ion Ghica was the government of Romania from 18 December 1870 to 11 March 1871.

== Composition ==
The ministers of the cabinet were as follows:

- President of the Council of Ministers:

- Ion Ghica (18 December 1870 - 11 March 1871)

- Minister of the Interior:

- Ion Ghica (18 December 1870 - 11 March 1871)

- Minister of Foreign Affairs:

- Nicolae Calimachi-Catargiu (18 December 1870 - 11 March 1871)

- Minister of Finance:

- Dimitrie Sturdza (18 December 1870 - 11 March 1871)

- Minister of Justice:

- Dimitrie Cariagdi (18 December 1870 - 11 March 1871)

- Minister of War:

- Col. Eustațiu Pencovici (18 December 1870 - 11 March 1871)

- Minister of Religious Affairs and Public Instruction:

- Nicolae Gr. Racoviță (18 December 1870 - 11 March 1871)

- Minister of Public Works:

- Dimitrie Berindei (18 December 1870 - 11 March 1871)

Preceded by First Epureanu cabinet	Cabinet of Romania; 18 December 1870 - 11 March 1871	Succeeded by Second Lascăr Catargiu cabinet
