= Alexandru G. Golescu cabinet =

Government of Romania, February–April 1870

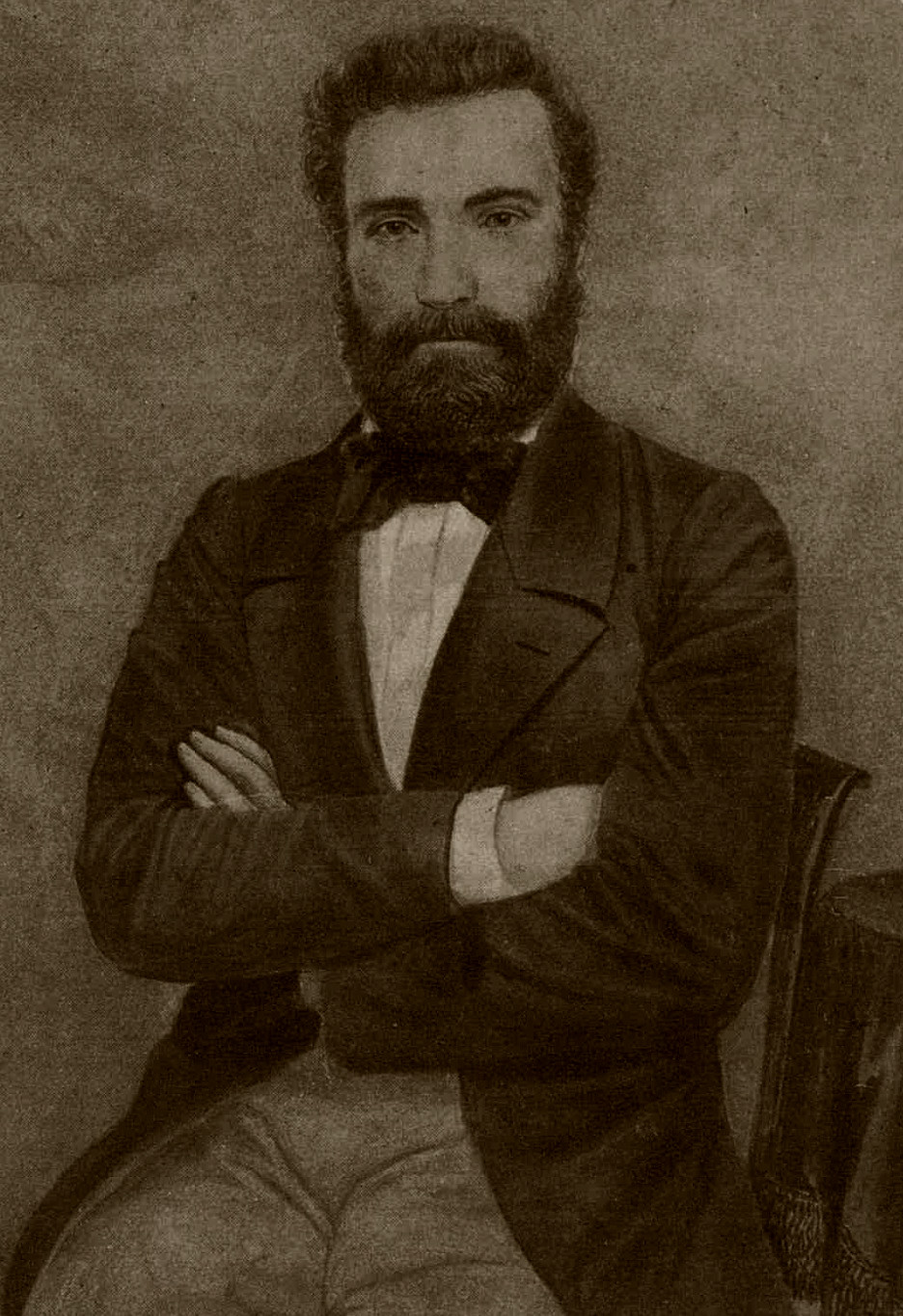
Alexandru Golescu

The cabinet of Alexandru G. Golescu was the government of Romania from 2 February to 18 April 1870.

== Composition ==
The ministers of the cabinet were as follows:

- President of the Council of Ministers:

- Alexandru G. Golescu (2 February - 18 April 1870)

- Minister of the Interior:

- Alexandru G. Golescu (2 February - 18 April 1870)

- Minister of Foreign Affairs:

- (interim) Alexandru G. Golescu (2 February - 18 April 1870)

- Minister of Finance:

- Ioan Al. Cantacuzino (2 February - 18 April 1870)

- Minister of Justice:

- Dimitrie P. Vioreanu (2 February - 18 April 1870)

- Minister of War:

- Col. George Manu (2 February - 18 April 1870)

- Minister of Religious Affairs and Public Instruction:

- George Mârzescu (2 February - 18 April 1870)

- Minister of Public Works:

- Dimitrie Cozadini (2 February - 18 April 1870)

Preceded by Dimitrie Ghica cabinet	Cabinet of Romania; 2 February 1870 - 18 April 1870	Succeeded by First Epureanu cabinet
