= Vioreanu =

Vioreanu is a surname. Notable people with the surname include:

- Dimitrie P. Vioreanu (1831–1881), Romanian jurist
- Mihai Vioreanu (born 1974), Romanian rugby union player
