= Bosianu cabinet =

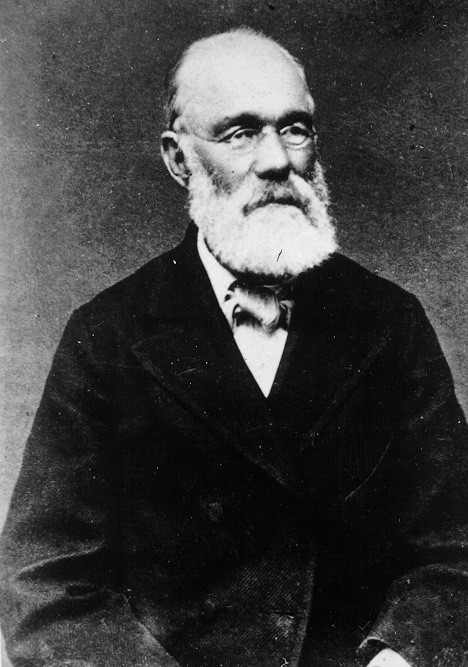
Constantin Bosianu

The cabinet of Constantin Bosianu was the government of Romania from 26 January to 14 June 1865.

== Composition ==
The ministers of the cabinet were as follows:

- President of the Council of Ministers:

- Constantin Bosianu (26 January - 14 June 1865)

- Minister of the Interior, Agriculture, and Public Works:

- Constantin Bosianu (26 January - 14 June 1865)

- Minister of Foreign Affairs:

- Nicolae Rosetti-Bălănescu (26 January - 14 June 1865)

- Minister of Finance:

- Ion Strat (26 January - 14 June 1865)

- Minister of Justice and Religious Affairs:

- George Vernescu (26 January - 14 June 1865)

- Minister of War:

- Gen. Savel Manu (26 January - 14 June 1865)

- Minister of Control:

- (interim) Nicolae Rosetti-Bălănescu (26 January - 14 June 1865)

Preceded by Kogălniceanu cabinet	Cabinet of Romania; 26 January 1865 - 14 June 1865	Succeeded by Second Nicolae Kretzulescu cabinet
