= Dimitrie I. Ghika =

Romanian politician and diplomat

Dimitrie I. Ghica
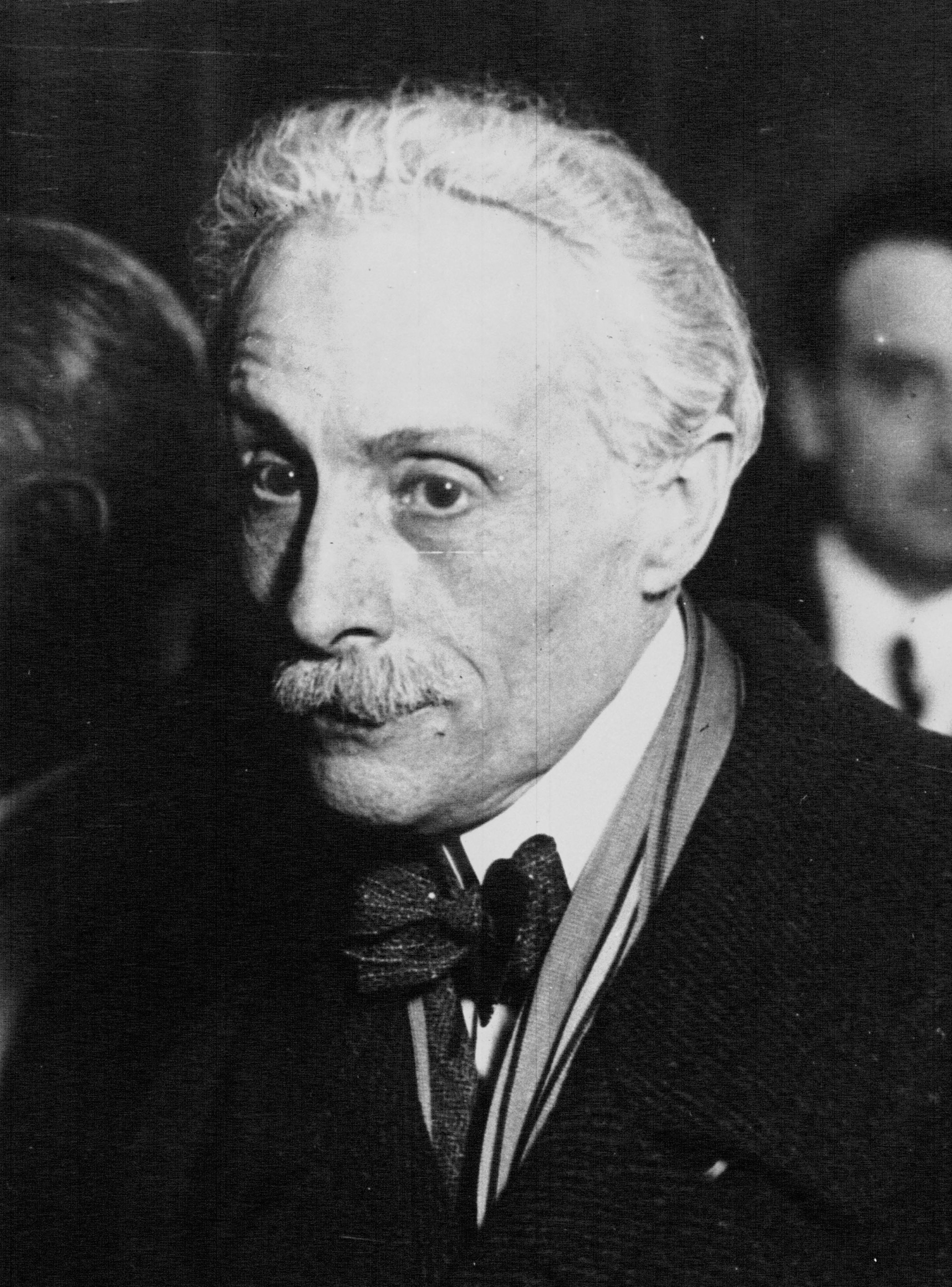
- Dimitrie Ghika in 1932

Minister of Foreign Affairs of Romania
- In office April 27, 1931 – June 5, 1932
- Monarch: Carol II of Romania
- Preceded by: Constantin Argetoianu
- Succeeded by: Alexandru Vaida-Voevod

Personal details
- Born: January 21, 1875 Constantinople, Ottoman Empire
- Died: October 13, 1967 (aged 92) Brussels, Belgium
- Parents: Ioan Grigore Ghica (father); Alexandrina Moret de Blaremberg (mother)
- Relatives: Vladimir Ghika (brother)

Dimitrie I. Ghika or Ghica (21 January 1875 – 13 October 1967) was a Romanian politician and diplomat. He was the son of Ioan Grigore Ghica, former minister of National Defence and of Foreign Affairs.

Dimitrie Ghika studied at the University of Toulouse and at the Paris Institute of Political Studies. He entered the diplomatic service in 1894 as secretary to the Romanian legation in Rome. His other assignments took him to Saint Petersburg, Bern, Vienna, and Sofia.

In 1919 he was part of the Romanian delegation to the Paris Peace Conference, signing the Treaty of Sèvres. He thereafter worked closely with Nicolae Titulescu. He was Minister of Foreign Affairs from April 27, 1931 to June 5, 1932 in the government headed by Nicolae Iorga. He was appointed minister plenipotentiary to Belgium and Luxembourg, being recalled in 1936 due to the reshuffling of the Romanian diplomatic corps after the dismissal of Nicolae Titulescu. Dimitrie I. Ghika retired in 1937.

He was brother of Vladimir Ghika.

Dimitrie Ghika also translated the Histories of Herodotus into Romanian. He also published a study on the relations between France and the Romanian Principalities during the French Revolution and the First French Empire.

== Works ==
- Istoriile lui Erodot. Traducere română din limba originală însoțite de textul elinesc și de note, 1894.
- Franța și principatele Dunărene – 1789–1815 (republished Institutul European, 2008. ISBN 978-973-611-511-0]

== See also ==
- Foreign relations of Romania
- Ghica family
