= Dimitrie Cariagdi =

Romanian politician

Dimitrie Cariagdi (also Careagdi, Cariagdis, Cariagdy, or Kariagdi; 1815 – 10 October 1893) was a Wallachian, later Romanian, politician and lawyer.

== Biography ==
=== Early life and political debut ===
Cariagdi had several siblings, including a brother who was dead by 1877. Another brother, named Ioan, was also Dimitrie's colleague at Ioan Haviarà's school in 1828. The self-styled Princes were of Greek origin, and Dimitrie was reviled as such by his nationalist adversaries. One of these was poet-journalist Mihai Eminescu, who once described him one of the country's most odious "Phanariotes". As a youth, he completed his education at the University of Paris. Returning home in 1838, Cariagdi joined the magistracy, eventually becoming state's attorney.

Of the Cariagdi brothers, Ioan achieved public notoriety during the Wallachian Revolution of 1848. An administrator of the salt mines in Slănic, he supported the revolutionary agenda, but warned the Wallachian government that his subordinates were quitting their jobs to join the national guard, and thus jeopardizing salt extraction. By 1852, he had become perennial administrator of the salt mine in Telega, which was also used for imprisoning Wallachian criminals, and which he reformed into a more humane facility. A decade later, Ioan was politically active in the newly formed United Principalities. In the 1864 election, he was sent to the Assembly of Deputies by the town of Câmpina.

In June 1865, after several years of political involvement, Dimitrie Cariagdi was named Justice Minister, in office until the following February; for the same duration, he was also the Minister of Education and Religious Affairs, in which position he was involved with the secularization of monastery estates. That policy had been favored by the Romanian Domnitor, Alexandru Ioan Cuza, as a step toward land reform. Following the secularization, Cariagdi and Cuza were accused of having illegally granted the Kretzulescu Church to the Prime Minister, Nicolae Kretzulescu. In mid-1865, the minister encouraged Aromanians from Salonica vilayet to look to Romania for national guidance, by granting them scholarships and by creating a "Macedonian Institute" in Bucharest. His mandate also came with the institution of compulsory education, announced in Cariagdi's decree as a function of Christianity and Romanian nationalism:

so that each man may learn how to pray to God as a good Christian, and how to be a decent human being, and how to take care of one's forrow, one's hut, one's life, with a mind that's without bias, and to know how to preserve them and protect these from all things wicked and evil, and especially so that every man knows that he is Romanian and how great the Romanian country is, and how each one of us is bound to love it and its Domnitor, because when we are stripped of our own country, there can be no justice or good left for anyone, as Romanians say: "O Lord, please protect even my enemies from the mercy of strangers."

=== Creditul Urban and PNL ===
For a short while in November, Cariagdi was additionally interim Finance Minister. The three executive functions made him part of the last ministerial team to serve under Cuza, who was ousted by the "monstrous coalition" in a bloodless coup. He resumed his career under the new Domnitor, Carol I, serving numerous terms as deputy and senator. Thus, in the election of May 1870, he took a senatorial seat for the Second College in Prahova County, with 75 votes from a total 78. In December 1870, he was again Justice Minister, included in the third Ghica cabinet, remaining until March 1871.

Cariagdi was also secretly close to the exiled Cuza. In January 1872, he was at Naples alongside the conspirator Alexandru Candiano-Popescu. From here, he wrote a letter to Cuza, inviting him to return to Bucharest and "put an end to our misfortune." In February 1875, Cariagdi established Creditul Urban, a credit union which sought to bring in funds for the development and beautification of Bucharest. It obtained its first financing, of 100 thousand lei, from the Romanian state (represented by Gheorghe Grigore Cantacuzino, the acting Finance Minister).

In June 1875, Cariagdi became an inaugural member of the National Liberal Party (PNL). He stood in the elections of June 1876, winning a First-College deputy seat at Prahova (beating Theodor C. Văcărescu 50 votes to 36). In his twin capacities as elector and deputy, the Prince made efforts to impose stricter voting regulations, including voter identification laws. He reported that, though his college was the smallest, he rarely met his fellow voters, and claimed that his deceased brother had been registered as casting votes in three successive elections. These efforts were interrupted by the Romanian war of independence, severing the country's remaining links with the Ottoman Empire. Cariagdi supported the Romanian Army, donating two horses for the front in April 1877. In September 1878, Carol I gave him special dispensation to wear the Order of Saint Anna, Second Class, as awarded to him by the Russian Empire.

=== As Mayor ===
Cariagdi ran for the Bucharest City Council in November 1878, taking one of the four seats in contest for the First College, as part of a National Liberal sweep. Soon after, Constantin Bosianu handed in his resignation as Mayor of Bucharest. Cariagdi was voted in by the council to replace him, and Carol signed their wish into a decree on 19 December. This did not interrupt his other mandate as deputy: May 1879, he presided over an Assembly session, standing in for the more senior Gheorghe Magheru (who was ailing).

Cariagdi's chief achievement as Mayor was a public works project for managing the Dâmbovița River. He expanded on initial work done by a previous interim mayor, I. P. Dumitrescu, who had borrowed some 15 million lei in 1877. Cariagdi and the chief engineer Dimitrie Matac (who was also his nephew) approved of a plan, and selected the subcontractors in October 1880; the mayor himself launched the works in November, at a site in Vitan. Cariagdi's other focus was on culture and education: in one sweeping move, he instituted linguistic protectionism, with fines for all shop signs in languages other than Romanian. He contributed, more seriously than his predecessor Gheorghe Manu, to the city-funded program of school-building—with five new schools erected under his mandate.

Cariagdi served during the formation of the Kingdom of Romania. In August 1880, Carol I, as the reigning King of Romania, made him and the Police Prefect, Radu Mihai, Grand Officers of the Order of the Crown. That December, Carol also granted him special permit to display the Belgian Order of Leopold, of which Cariagdi was a Commander. By then, Cariagdi and Calinic Miclescu, the Metropolitan-Primate, had been named executors of Răducanu Simonide's last will. As such, they helped build a Simonide wing for Filantropia Hospital, by selling off land that the deceased had owned in Gogoșari.

The Prince finally stepped down from his city-hall office in November 1883 (making him the longest-serving mayor of the Romanian capital until the 1930s). His Dâmbovița works had been under scrutiny since August 1881, when a city engineer, Nicolae Cucu Starostescu, warned that the project was overpriced and suboptimal. The whistleblower was well received by the Deputy Mayor N. Manolescu, during a time when Cariagdi was at a spa; the Mayor returned in September, furiously silencing Cucu Starostescu, and then demoting him. Criticism became more widespread: he was ultimately brought down by an alliance between the Conservative Party and some of Cariagdi's National Liberal allies.

=== Old age and legal troubles ===
The leading PNL tribune, Voința Națională, openly sided with Cucu Starostescu, describing him as a savior of Bucharest. The same newspaper claimed that Cariagdi's favoritism toward the Swiss engineer Arnold Bürkli had squandered public resources on "insane projects". In 1897, the Conservative daily Opinia summarized the Dâmbovița sanitation scheme as having "enriched the family of Mayor Cariagdi".

By January 1886, Cariagdi had retired from politics, and was running a charitable society for the creation of kindergartens (or "Fröbelian schools"). In this capacity, he invited people to celebrate Old-Style Christmas, alongside the sponsored children, at St. Catherine's Church. A government audit at Creditul Urban, carried out around the same time, uncovered irregularities. However, he was not seen as a culprit by the auditors, who instead cited him as a witness against the executive manager, Constantin I. Băicoianu. In March 1888, Cariagdi was under medical care at Slănic-Moldova. The future philosopher Ion Petrovici, who was still a child, recalls meeting him there: "a chilly little old man, but one with the halo of a former minister".

By June 1889, Cariagdi was one of the figures assigned by a Bucharest tribunal to administer the state pension received by Mihai Eminescu—his lifelong adversary, now incapacitated by illness. By then, the court of auditors had formally ruled that Cariagdi, Manolescu, Grigore Serrurie and other former members of the city administration should pay 479,000 lei as reparations for their ill-management. The group appealed to the High Court, since all the incriminated decisions had been vetted by the Ministry of Internal Affairs. The High Court ruled in their favor on 30 June, noting that the auditors had abused their offices. As claimed in 1893 by the Conservatives at Timpul, if Cariagdi was never brought to justice, it was only because Romania the body of auditors was itself in disarray.

=== Final ventures and death ===
Cariagdi had re-entered electoral politics in October 1888, when he tried but failed to obtain a senatorial seat for Prahova's First College. In late 1889, he joined the central committee of the Liberal Democratic Party, established by Dumitru Brătianu as a breakaway alternative to the PNL. In April 1890, as the two groups reconciled and reunited, he and Serrurie were called up and recognized as PNL seniors. The scene was ridiculed by the anti-PNL Lupta, which claimed that both men could hardly stand up, and that their respective speeches were riddled with 50-year-old slogans.

Also then, Cariagdi was elected (not without "seemingly endless negotiations") on the steering committee of Bucharest's PNL club. He then defeated G. Dobriceanu in the inner-party race for the senatorial by-election in Ilfov's Second College. The announcement was poorly received by the papers, across ideological divides: on the PNL's left, Românul asked its readers not to vote for Cariagdi, since he had no real program; Adevărul and Constituționalul hosted revelations about acts that Cariagdi had supposedly tolerated as mayor. He now received backing from Voința Națională, which claimed that his election was vital in ensuring civilian control over the Gendarmerie, as well as genuine decentralization. The race saw him defeated by the Conservative Nicolae At. Popovici, who was validated on 20 April.

In addition to being cited as a "generous donor" in early childhood education, the Prince was president of the Romanian Kindergarten Society. He served as such to April 1890, when he resigned for personal reasons. He continued to manage Creditul Urban, generating more controversy during his final years. According to Conservative reports, he had peddled his influence, pushing the enterprise to buy off, Letea Paper Mill that was then leased to his nephew Matac in exchange for only "a paltry sum." Cariagdi interrupted his assignments in July 1892, when he became incapacitated by illness in Sinaia, calling on the Bucharest physician N. Măldărescu to assist him there. The former minister died on 10 October 1893.

== Legacy ==
Cariagdi was buried in Bucharest two days after his death, with a farewell ceremony held in front of the credit union building. King Carol was represented by Colonel Bereșteanu. The deceased Prince had adopted his Greek (and partly French) nephew, Alexandru Iovanaki, whose parents had committed suicide; he also sponsored the young man's education at the École Centrale, though Iovanaki never practiced. Through this connection, Cariagdi was the posthumous great-uncle of writer Ion Vinea, born Ion Eugen Iovanaki in April 1895. In Vinea's time, the Prince's incompetence was further exposed by the publication of diaries kept by a Conservative rival, Titu Maiorescu.
