= Gheorghe Bengescu =

Romanian diplomat and man of letters

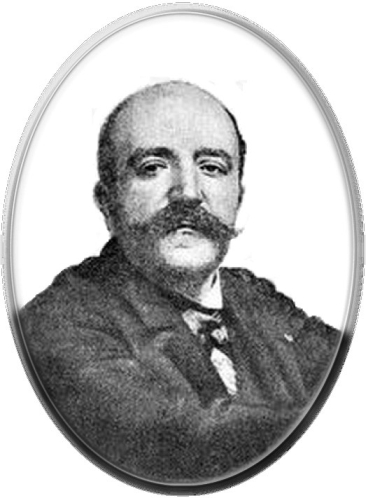
- Born: August 30, 1848; Craiova, Wallachia
- Died: August 23, 1921 (aged 72); Paris, France
- Occupation: diplomat

Gheorghe Bengescu (Francized Georges Bengesco; August 30, 1848–August 23, 1922) was a Romanian diplomat and man of letters.

Born in Craiova to Grigore Bengescu as the scion of a boyar family, he studied in Paris, earning a doctorate in political and administrative sciences, before returning to Romania. There, he served as prosecutor and judge for the Ilfov County tribunal and also worked as a French teacher. Entering the diplomatic service in 1872, he was secretary at the legations in Vienna and London, arriving in the latter city in 1882. He rose to first secretary in 1885 and legation adviser in 1889. He was also first secretary in Paris, then legation adviser. From 1891 to 1898, he was minister plenipotentiary at Brussels, also accredited to The Hague, until he resigned.

While abroad, Bengescu published a series of works on literature, producing sixteen books in as many years, including a four-volume bibliography of Voltaire that received a prize from the Académie française. His bibliography of Oriental culture was much appreciated by contemporaries, while his studies in Romanian covered Vasile Alecsandri (1886-1888), Queen Elisabeth of Romania (1906) and the literary activity of Golescu family members. Bengescu belonged to the administration of the Société d'Histoire littéraire de la France, becoming vice president. He represented Romania in the Société d'histoire diplomatique. Elected a corresponding member of the Romanian Academy in 1883, he rose to titular status in 1921. He died in Paris.
