= Barbu Bellu =

Romanian baron, minister of culture and minister of justice

Barbu Bellu (1825–1900) was a Romanian baron, minister of culture, and minister of justice. Bellu Cemetery, the most famous cemetery in Romania, sits on a plot of land which used to be a garden owned by Bellu's family.

A member of the Bellu family, of Aromanian origin, he was born in Bucharest. He studied at home and then in Greece around the year 1843. In 1850, he became a judge of the Ilfov County courthouse and in 1852, the presiding judge of the same courthouse. He was a prosecutor at Curtea de Argeș in 1856 and starting 1859, a judge at the Romanian High Court of Justice.

In 1862, Barbu Bellu was named the minister of culture, but he resigned in June after Prime Minister Barbu Catargiu, his cousin, was assassinated. In 1863, he was the Minister of Justice in the Kretzulescu cabinet for one month.

He was a Member of Parliament, representing Muscel County in 1859, 1861, and 1864. In 1866, Austrian Emperor Franz Josef gave him the title of baron. After Alexandru Ioan Cuza abdicated, Barbu Bellu retired from public life.

In the fall of 1889 he drove around Bucharest in a 4-seat, 4-hp Peugeot automobile that could reach a speed of 18 km/h (11 mph); it is said that he was the first one to drive a car in Romania. When he died in 1900, the newspapers wrote, Se stinse Baronul Bellu, cel cu automobelu ("Baron Bellu, the one with an automobellu, has died"). He was buried in the cemetery that bears his name.
