= Alexandru Cantacuzino (minister) =

Romanian politician

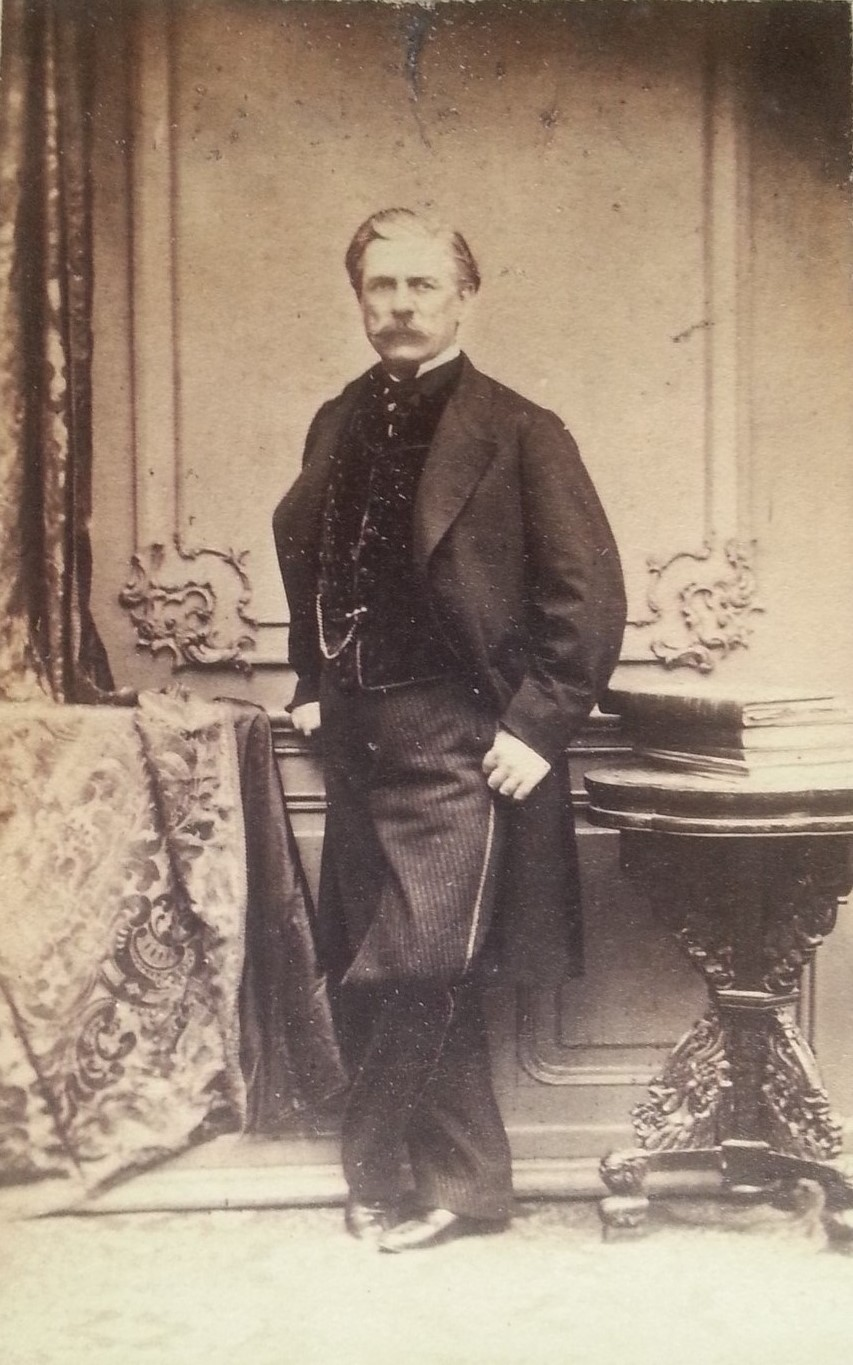

Minister of Foreign Affairs of Principality of Romania
- In office 24 June 1862 – 29 September 1862
- Monarch: Alexandru Ioan Cuza
- Preceded by: Apostol Arsache
- Succeeded by: Ioan G. Ghica

Minister of Finance of Principality of Romania
- In office 12 July 1862 – 16 March 1863
- Preceded by: Teodor Ghica
- Succeeded by: Constantin I. Iliescu

Personal details
- Born: 1811
- Died: 8 March 1884 (aged 72–73) Athens, Greece
- Spouse: Marie Cantacuzène

Alexandru Cantacuzino (1811 – 8 March 1884) was a Romanian politician from the Cantacuzino family who served as the Minister of Foreign Affairs from 24 June 1862 until 29 September 1862, and as the Minister of Finance from 12 July 1862 until 16 March 1863.

He was the son of Alexandros Kantakouzinos and Ukrainian Yelizaveta Mykhailivna Daragan. He married his cousin Marie Cantacuzène.
