= First Epureanu cabinet =

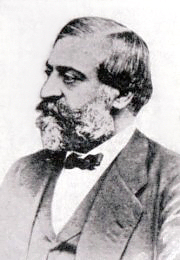
Manolache Costache Epureanu

The first cabinet of Manolache Costache Epureanu was the government of Romania from 20 April to 14 December 1870.

== Composition ==
The ministers of the cabinet were as follows:

- President of the Council of Ministers:

- Manolache Costache Epureanu (20 April - 14 December 1870)

- Minister of the Interior:

- Manolache Costache Epureanu (20 April - 14 December 1870)

- Minister of Foreign Affairs:

- Petre P. Carp (20 April - 14 December 1870)

- Minister of Finance:

- Constantin Grădișteanu (20 April - 14 December 1870)

- Minister of Justice:

- Alexandru Lahovary (20 April - 14 December 1870)

- Minister of War:

- Col. George Manu (20 April - 14 December 1870)

- Minister of Religious Affairs and Public Instruction:

- Vasile Pogor (20 April - 23 May 1870)
- (interim) Petre P. Carp (23 May - 14 December 1870)

- Minister of Public Works:

- Gheorghe Grigore Cantacuzino (20 April - 14 December 1870)

Preceded by Alexandru G. Golescu cabinet	Cabinet of Romania; 20 April 1870 - 14 December 1870	Succeeded by Third Ion Ghica cabinet
