= Horodniceni =

- Commune
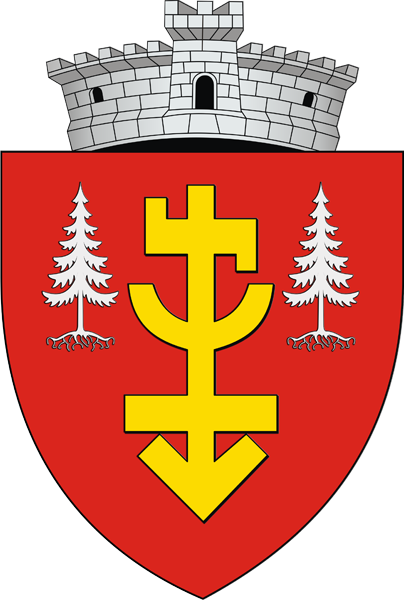
- Coat of arms

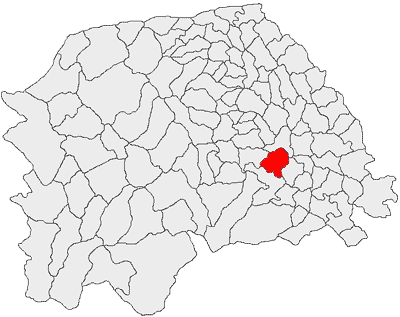
- Location in Suceava County

- Location in Romania
- Coordinates: 47°32′N 26°10′E
- Country: Romania
- County: Suceava
- Subdivisions: Horodniceni, Botești, Brădățel, Mihăiești, Rotopănești

Government
  - Mayor (2024–2028): Neculai Florea (PNL)
- Area: 57 km^{2} (22 sq mi)
- Elevation: 387 m (1,270 ft)
- Population (2021-12-01): 3,233
  - Density: 57/km^{2} (150/sq mi)
- Time zone: EET/EEST (UTC+2/+3)
- Postal code: 727310
- Area code: (+40) x30
- Vehicle reg.: SV
- Website: comunahorodnicenisv.ro

Horodniceni is a commune located in Suceava County, Romania. It is composed of five villages: Botești, Brădățel, Horodniceni, Mihăiești, and Rotopănești.

== Natives ==
- Marie Cantacuzène
