= Alexandru Emanoil Florescu =

Wallachian and Romanian politician

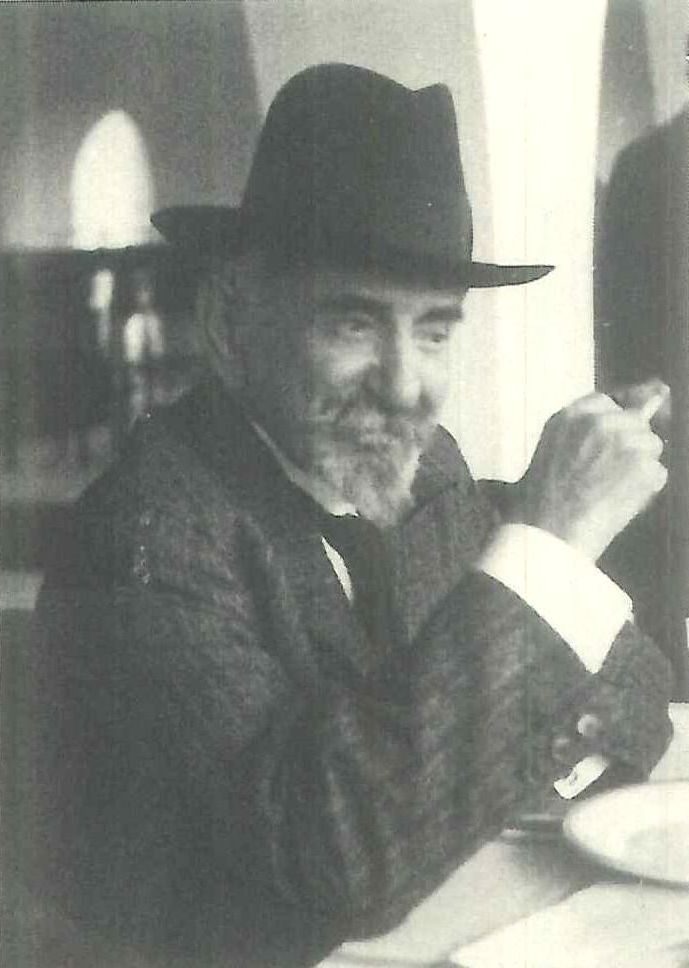
- Born: 22 January 1822
- Died: 1907 (aged 84–85)

Alexandru Emanoil Florescu (22 January 1822 – 1907) was a Wallachian and Romanian politician. Florescu came from a boyar family; his father Manolache was a vornic, while his mother was Tinca Faca. He was the younger brother of Ioan Emanoil Florescu. Born in Brașov, in the Transylvania region of the Austrian Empire, he left for the Wallachian capital Bucharest, where he attended Saint Sava College. He graduated in 1840, and Florescu then became a copyist at the state secretariat, later rising to secretary. In 1846 he went to Paris, studying law for two years. After the Wallachian Revolution of 1848, he returned home and was named to a number of terms as county prefect and prefect of the Bucharest police.

In the years leading up to the Union of the Principalities, which he supported, Florescu was a director in the Interior Ministry and, in 1857, entered the Wallachian ad hoc Divan. He formed part of the first government covering all Romania, led by Barbu Catargiu, and served as Minister of Control from March to June 1862. In the succeeding cabinet, that of Nicolae Kretzulescu, he was Public Works Minister from June to October. He was President of the Assembly of Deputies from December 1864 to June 1865. He served a number of terms as both deputy and senator.

He was married to Elena Manu. The couple had a son and three daughters.
