= Ion Bălăceanu =

Romanian politician

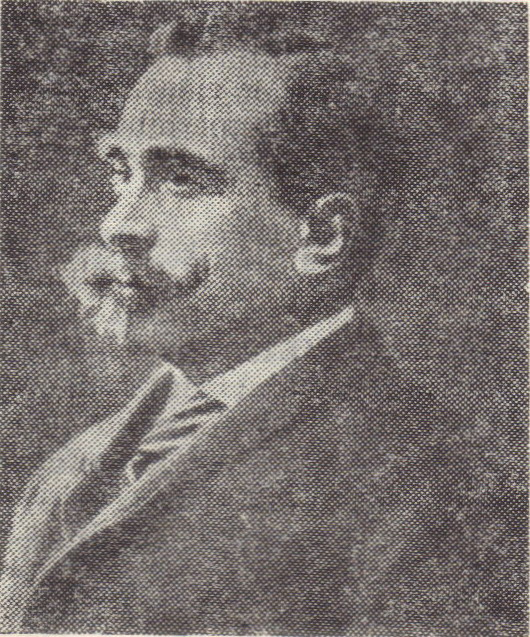
- Ion Bălăceanu

Minister of Foreign Affairs
- In office 30 January 1876 – 31 March 1876
- Monarch: Carol I of Romania
- Preceded by: Vasile Boerescu
- Succeeded by: Dimitrie Cornea

Personal details
- Born: 25 January 1828 Bucharest, Wallachia
- Died: 22 December 1914 (aged 86) Nice, France

Ion Bălăceanu (25 January 1828 – 22 December 1914) was the Minister of Foreign Affairs from 30 January 1876 until 31 March 1876 during the existence of United Principalities. Bălăceanu is considered one of the most active foreign ministers who promoted closer alliances of Romania with Great Britain and France rather than with Germany and Russia.
