= Marie Cantacuzène =

Romanian princess and painter's model

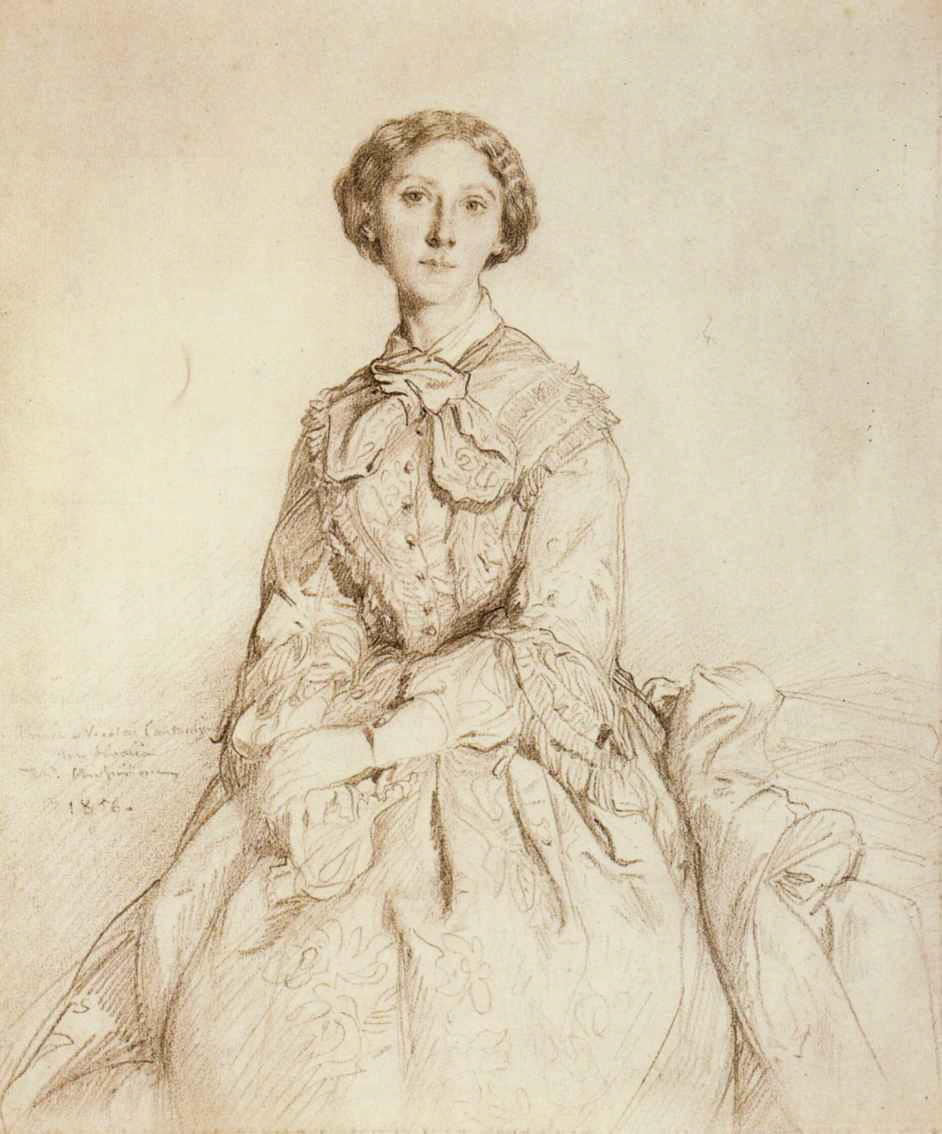
- Born: 20 July 1820; Horodniceni, Moldavia
- Died: 29 August 1898 (aged 78); Paris, France
- Occupation: painter's model

Marie Cantacuzène (20 July 1820 – 29 August 1898) was a Romanian princess and painter's model, and wife of the painter Pierre Puvis de Chavannes.

== Biography ==
Marie Cantacuzène was the eldest of the three children of Prince Nicholas Cantacuzène and Princess Pulcheria Sturdza. She received a Catholic education, and was fluent in French. At age 16 in 1836, she married Gheorghe Stratulat, a boyar, but the couple quickly separated. She then married her cousin, Alexandru Cantacuzino, who served as a minister in Romania. They separated, but never divorced.

She was close friends with Nicolae Bălcescu and Vasile Alecsandri. From 1850, Cantacuzène lived with her father in Paris and Biarritz. In 1854, her brother introduced her to Théodore Chassériau, with whom she had a tumultuous relationship in the two years prior to painter's death.

Cantacuzène met Pierre Puvis de Chavannes at the Chassériau workshop, and the couple were in a relationship from 1856. She was a frequent model for him, featuring in a number of his paintings and sketches. They maintained their relationship for 40 years, finally marrying on 21 July 1898, just before their deaths.
