= Vasile Boerescu =

Romanian politician, journalist and lawyer

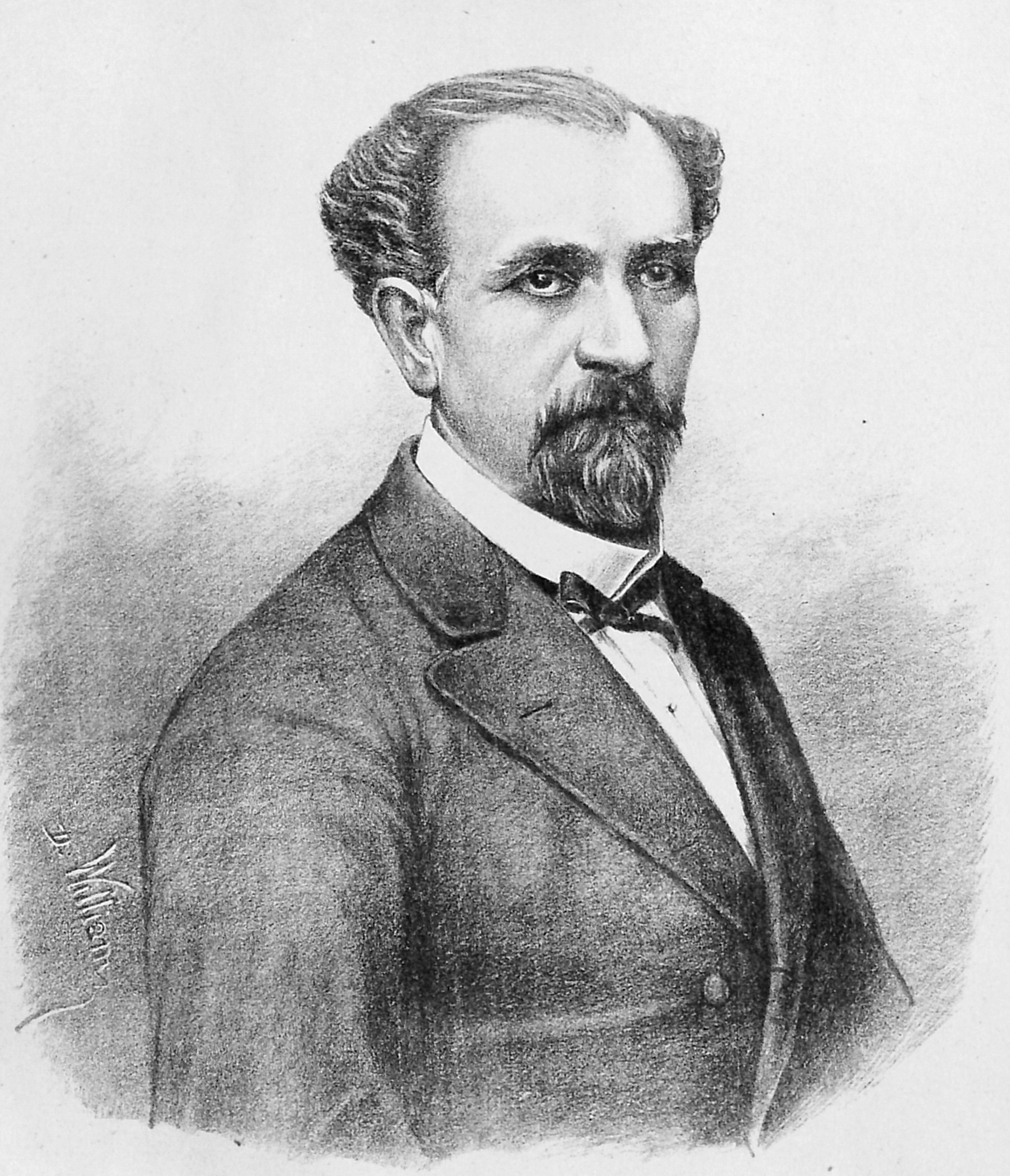

Minister of Justice
- In office May 28, 1860 – July 5, 1860
- Monarch: Alexandru Ioan Cuza
- In office July 13, 1860 – April 14, 1861
- Monarch: Alexandru Ioan Cuza
- In office November 16, 1868 – January 21, 1870
- Monarch: Carol I of Romania

Minister of Foreign Affairs
- In office April 28, 1873 – January 29, 1876
- Preceded by: Gheorghe Costaforu
- Succeeded by: Ion Bălăceanu
- In office July 11, 1879 – April 9, 1881
- Monarch: Carol I of Romania
- Preceded by: Ion C. Câmpineanu
- Succeeded by: Dimitrie A. Sturdza

Minister of Religion and Public Instruction
- In office July 13, 1860 – October 17, 1860
- In office January 9, 1874 – April 7, 1874
- Monarch: Carol I of Romania

Personal details
- Born: January 1, 1830 Bucharest, Wallachia
- Died: November 18, 1883 (aged 53) Paris, France

Vasile Boerescu (January 1, 1830 – November 18, 1883) was a journalist, lawyer and Romanian politician who served as the Minister of Justice, Minister of Foreign Affairs, Minister of Religion and Public Instruction and held other various governmental offices during the existence of the United Principalities.

== Early years ==
During the Wallachian Revolution of 1848, Boerescu was a student at Saint Sava National College in Bucharest and worked for a local newspaper. He graduated from college in 1850, and after a period of training at the School of Law in Bucharest, he moved to Paris where he obtained his license in 1855 and Ph.D. in Law in 1857. In October 1857, he also founded the newspaper Naționalul.

While in France, Boerescu promoted political rights of the Romanians under foreign prince. In 1857, after returning to Romania, he was hired as a professor of commercial law at the College of Saint Sava and in 1859 he started teaching law at the University of Bucharest. In March 1871, he became the rector of the University of Bucharest, but was shortly replaced by Ioan Zalomit. In October 1873, he became Dean of the Law Faculty.

== Political career ==
In January 1859 he was elected a deputy to the Legislative Assembly of Wallachia. Boerescu served as the Minister of Justice in three terms from May 28 to July 5, 1860, from July 13, 1860, to April 14, 1861, and from November 16, 1868, until January 21, 1870. He was then appointed the Minister of Foreign Affairs serving two terms from April 28, 1873, until January 29, 1876, and from July 11, 1879, to April 9, 1881. As a foreign minister, he conducted a balanced foreign policy vis-à-vis Ottoman Empire and played an active role in unification of Moldavian and Wallachian principalities. Boerescu also held the office of Minister of Religion and Public Instruction from July 13 to October 17, 1860, and from January 9 to April 7, 1874), Head of State Board of Education in October 1863 and Vice Chairman of the State Council in 1864. In 1866 he was elected to the Parliament of Romania.

Boerescu died on November 18, 1883, in Paris. A street in Ploiești bears his name.

== See also ==
- Foreign relations of Romania
