= Alexandru Ștefan Catargiu =

Alexandru Ștefan Catargiu (1825–1897) was a Wallachian, later Romanian politician.

== Biography ==
Alexandru Catargiu studied finance in Paris. After returning home, he entered the State Council. During March 1862, he served as Finance Minister in the Barbu Catargiu cabinet. From March to October 1863, he was Minister of Public Works and Audit. At the time of his death in Bucharest, he was on the board of directors of Căile Ferate Române.
