= Constantin I. Iliescu =

Romanian politician

Constantin I. Iliescu was a Romanian politician.

From March to October 1863, Iliescu served as Finance Minister under Nicolae Kretzulescu. From November 1865 to March 1866, he was the second mayor of Bucharest.
