= Eva Callimachi-Catargi =

French historical figure (1855-1882)

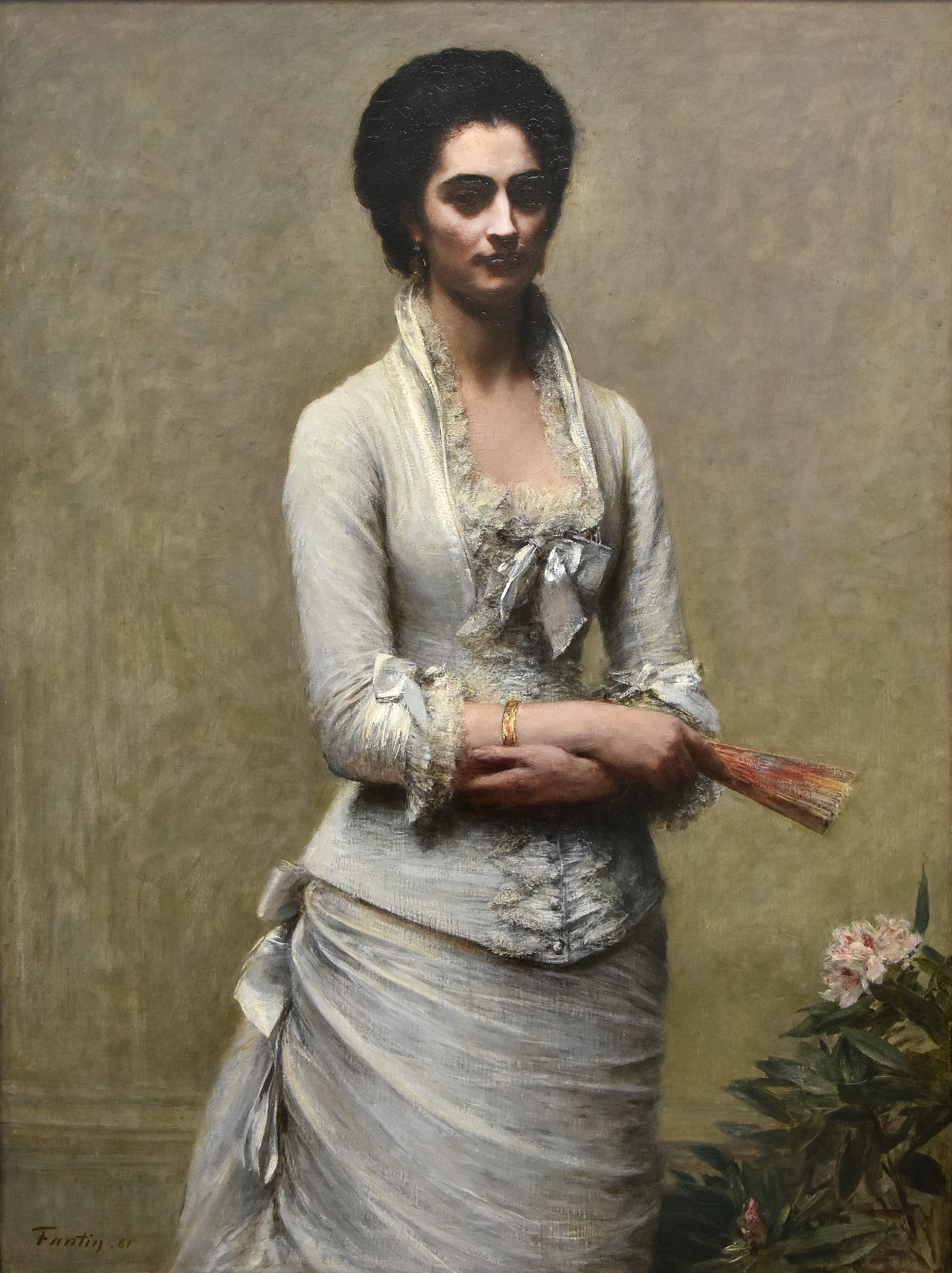
- Born: May 10, 1855; Paris, Île-de-France, France
- Died: May 29, 1913 (aged 58); Paris, Île-de-France, France
- Spouse: Alexandre de Basily (1882-1913)
- Children: 2
- Parents: Nicolae Calimachi-Catargiu (father); Marie Gracia Caroline Richardot (mother)

Eva Callimachi-Catargi (May 10, 1855 – May 29, 1913) was a Parisian heiress known for being the subject of two paintings by Henri Fantin-Latour.

== Biography ==
=== Early life ===
Eva was born on May 10, 1855, in Paris. Her father, Nicolae Calimachi-Catargiu, was a Romanian politician who came from a prominent Boyar family. Her mother was Marie Grazia Caroline Richardot. Eva's maternal grandparents were Charles Richardot, a Frenchman, and Eva Levie de Niem, who was of Dutch and Jewish descent.

=== Personal life ===
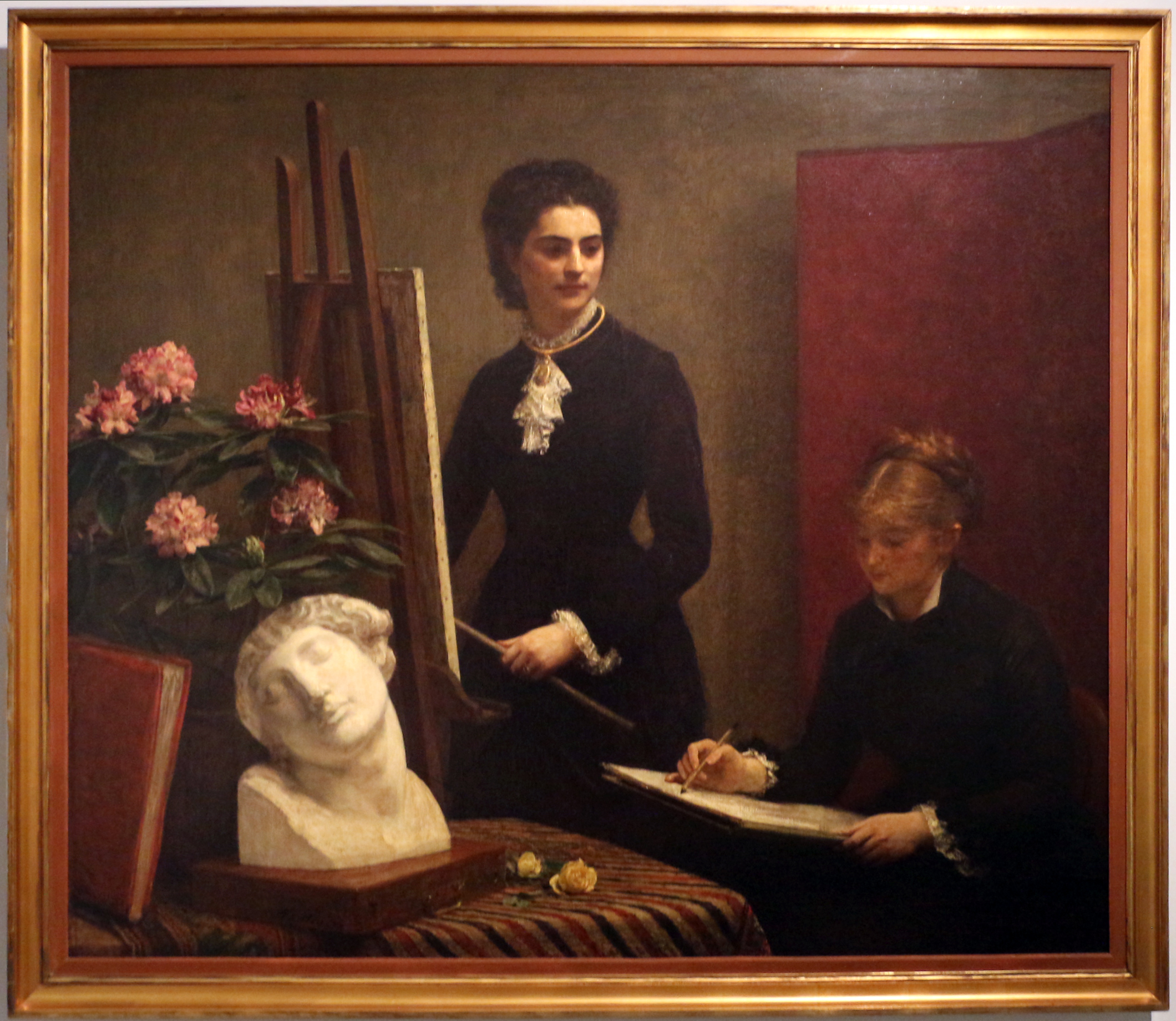
Double portrait of Eva Callimachi-Catargi and Louise Riesener, 1879.

Eva immersed herself into the art scene of Paris during the Belle Époque period, and modeled various works of art most famously two paintings by Henri Fantin-Latour Drawing lessons in the workshop (1879) and Portrait of Eva Calimachi-Catargiu (1881). Eva was a personal friend of Henri and many talented artists of the time including composer Ernest Chausson, and sculptor Auguste Rodin.

== Marriage and family ==
Eva married Alexandre de Basily on April 10, 1882, in the 8th arrondissement of Paris. Together they had two children:

- Nicolas de Basily (March 4, 1883 – March 20, 1963) was a Russian diplomat. He married Tatiana Hall in 1905, they had a son Alexandre de Basily (1906–1926). He married a second time to Lascelle Jean Meserve in 1919.
- Louis Constantin de Basily (December 21, 1888 – September 13, 1931)

Although the couple divorced in 1909, both continued to reside in Paris and never remarried. Eva died in Paris on May 29, 1913.

== Legacy ==
Eva's son, Nicolas, inherited her art collection. When Nicolas died in 1963, his widow Lascelle Jean Meserve donated his family's papers including personal notes to Stanford University. The Hoover Institution founded The Nicolas de Basily Room for its permanent exhibit on Russian culture.
