= Eustațiu Pencovici =

Romanian general

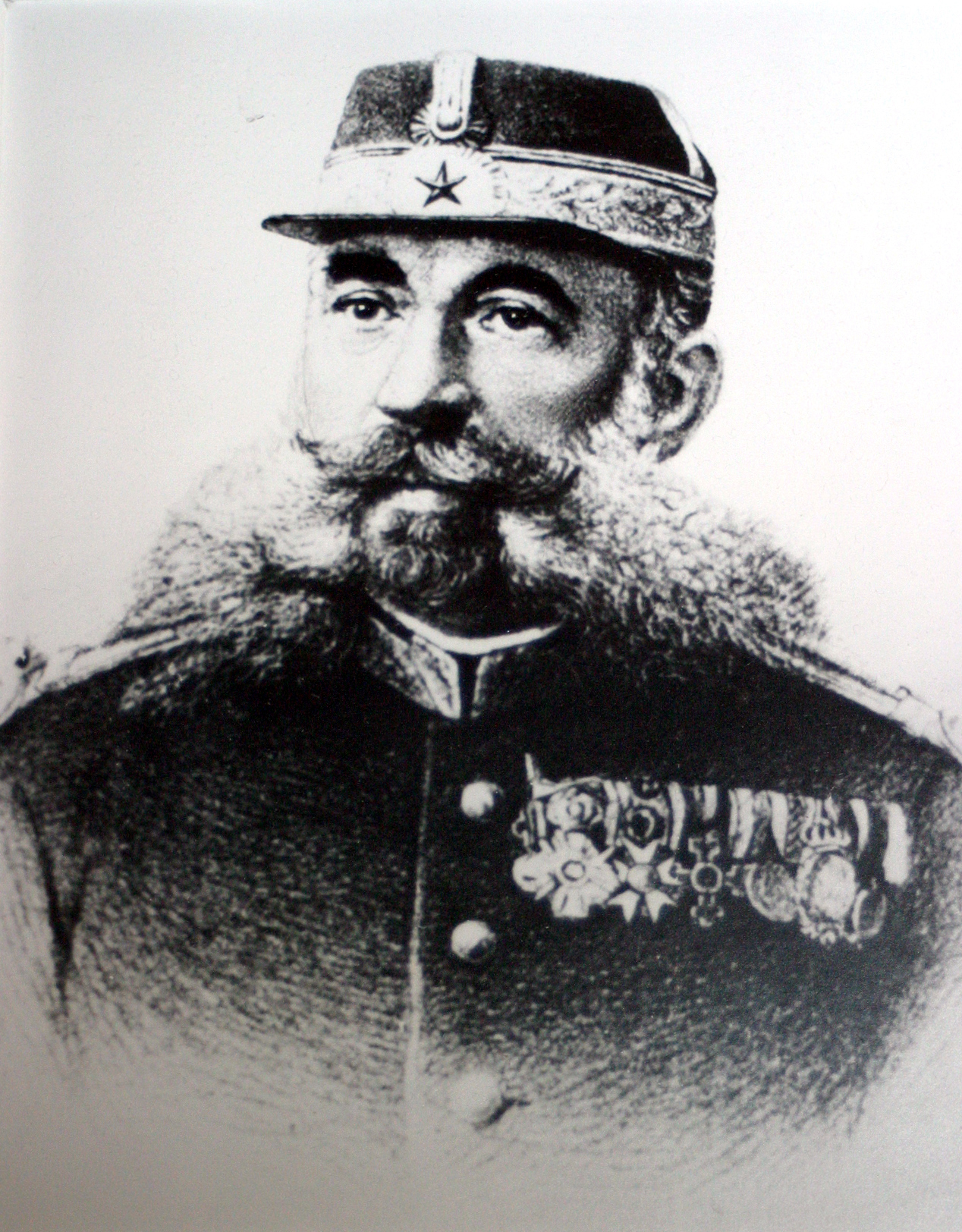
Eustațiu Pencovici

Eustațiu Pencovici (June 15, 1836–1899) was a Romanian general.

Born in Bucharest, he entered a military school and became a second lieutenant in the Wallachian militia in 1856. He was a colonel in December 1870, when he was named War Minister, serving until the following March. During the Romanian War of Independence, he was chief of staff for an infantry corps. He became a brigadier general in 1883 and retired in 1893.

In 1879, Pencovici became Romania's representative on the European Commission of the Danube. As such, over the next several years, he was closely involved in defending his country's claim to control over navigation rights along the Danube. Among his strategies was cooperation with Serbia and Bulgaria, fellow small riparian states. However, his apparent gains were thwarted by Austria-Hungary, which promised the pair concessions in other matters.
