= Dimitrie Cornea =

Romanian politician

Minister of Foreign Affairs
- In office 4 April 1876 – 26 April 1876
- Monarch: Carol I of Romania
- Preceded by: Ion Bălăceanu
- Succeeded by: Mihail Kogălniceanu

Personal details
- Born: 1816 Iași, Principality of Moldavia
- Died: 1884 (aged 67–68) Bucharest, Kingdom of Romania

Dimitrie Cornea (1816–1884) was the Minister of Justice during the Barbu Catargiu cabinet, from 22 January to 24 June 1862, and Minister of Foreign Affairs from 4 April 1876 until 26 April 1876 during the existence of United Principalities.
