= Ioan Grigore Ghica =

Romanian politician

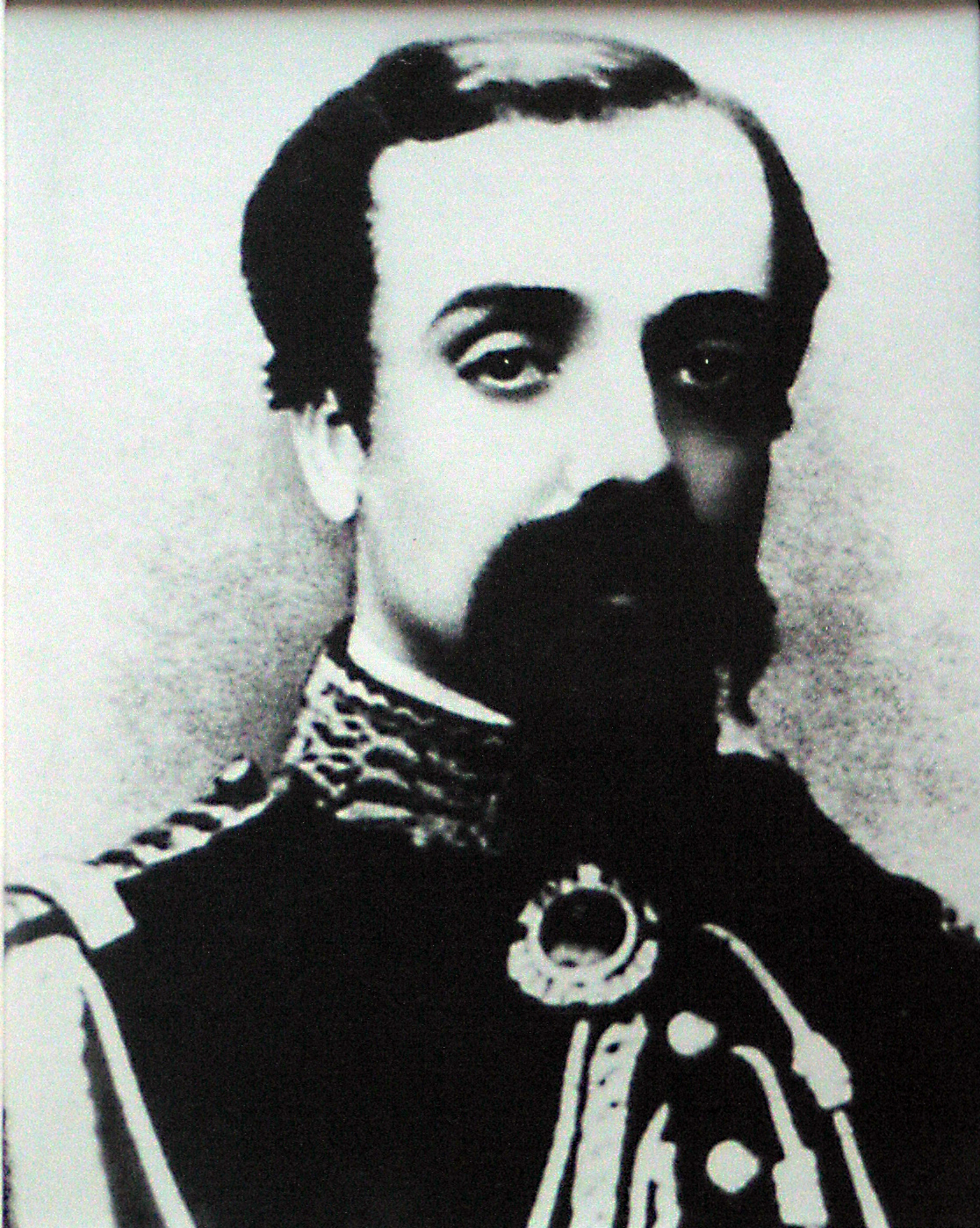

Minister of Foreign Affairs of Principality of Romania
- In office 17 October 1865 – 10 February 1866
- Monarch: Alexandru Ioan Cuza
- Preceded by: Alexandru Cantacuzino
- Succeeded by: Nicolae Rosetti-Bălănescu

Ministry of War of Principality of Romania
- In office 19 July 1861 – 29 September 1862
- Preceded by: office established
- Succeeded by: Ion Emanoil Florescu
- In office 11 May 1866 – 5 August 1866
- Preceded by: Dimitrie Lecca
- Succeeded by: Nicolae Haralambie

Personal details
- Born: 10 December 1830 Iași, Moldavia
- Died: 21 March 1881 (aged 50) Saint Petersburg, Russian Empire
- Spouse: Alexandrina Moret de Blaremberg
- Children: Vladimir Ghika; Dimitrie I. Ghika
- Parent: Grigore Alexandru Ghica (father)

Ioan Grigore Ghica (10 December 1830 – 21 March 1881) was a Romanian politician who served as the Minister of Foreign Affairs of Principality of Romania from 29 September 1862 to 29 August 1863. He also served as the Minister of War in two terms from 19 July 1861 until 29 September 1862, and from 11 May 1866 until 5 August 1866. Ioan Grigore Ghica also served as the ambassador to Istanbul, Vienna, Rome, and Saint Petersburg.

He was born in Iași, the son of the last Prince of Moldavia, Grigore Alexandru Ghica. He married Alexandrina Moret de Blaremberg, with whom he had five children, including Vladimir Ghika and Dimitrie I. Ghika.

== See also ==
- Ghica family
- Foreign relations of Romania
