= Grigore Bengescu =

Wallachian-Romanian politician

Grigore Bengescu (1824–1881) was a Wallachian, later Romanian, politician.

== Early life ==
Born in Craiova as the scion of a boyar family, Bengescu studied at the University of Vienna. Returning home, he occupied various administrative posts, including that of county prefect. He was Religious Affairs Minister under Barbu Dimitrie Știrbei.

== Career ==
Bengescu later served as general director of theaters and as ministerial department head. In the government of Mihail Kogălniceanu, he was Minister of Justice and Religious Affairs from January 21 to 26, 1865. He died in Bucharest.

== Family ==
Bengescu married Elena, the daughter of Iordache Golescu. Gheorghe Bengescu was their son.
