= Barbu Catargiu =

1st Prime Minister of Romania (February–June 1862)

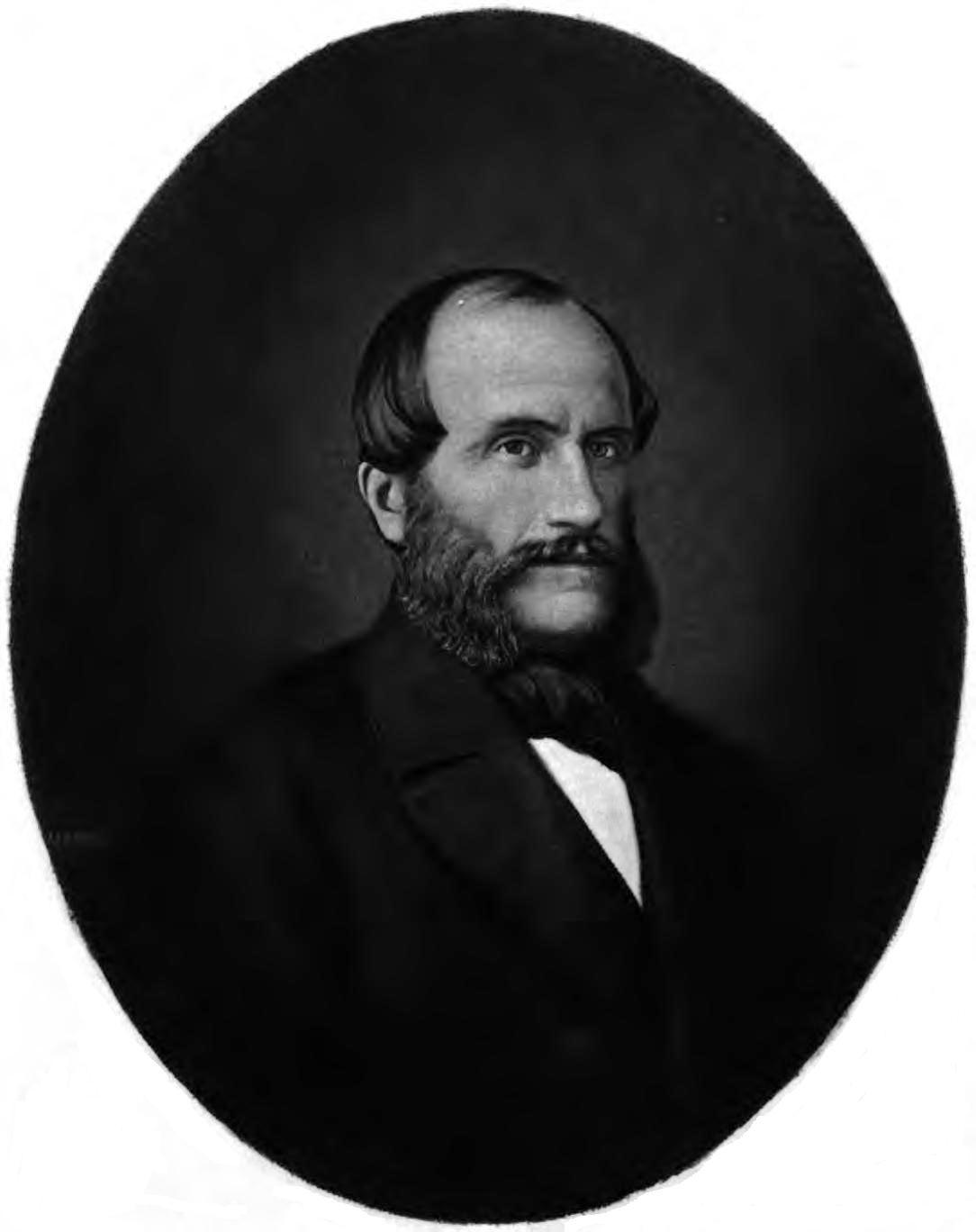

1st Prime Minister of Romania
- In office 22 January 1862 – 8 June 1862
- Monarch: Alexandru Ioan Cuza
- Preceded by: Position established (Note: Between 1859 and 1862, the united principalities of Wallachia and Moldavia continued to have two parallel governments albeit being one single vasal state.)
- Succeeded by: Nicolae Kretzulescu

Personal details
- Born: 7 November 1807 Bucharest, Wallachia
- Died: 20 June 1862 (aged 54) Bucharest, Romanian United Principalities
- Party: Conservative Party
- Spouse: Ecaterina Parravicini
- Education: University of Paris

Barbu Catargiu (Romanian pronunciation: [ˈbarbu katarˈd͡ʒi.u]; 26 October/7 November 1807 – 8/20 June 1862) was a conservative Romanian politician and journalist. He was the first Prime Minister of Romania, in 1862, until he was assassinated on 8 June that year. He was a staunch defender of the great estates of the boyars, and notably originated the conservative doctrine that "feudalism in Romania had never existed".

== Early life ==
Barbu Catargiu was born on 26 October 1807 to Ștefan Catargiu, a political activist and Țița (Stanca) Văcărescu. He lived abroad in Paris from 1825 to 1834, where he studied law, history, and philosophy. He returned to Wallachia for a short time and was a member of the National Assembly of Wallachia. An opponent of violence and armed revolution, he resumed his world travels during the Revolutions of 1848, working primarily as a journalist and making a documentary.

== Political life ==
After his return to Romania, Catargiu entered political life as a firm conservative. He believed that evolution, rather than violent revolution was the best way to modernize the Government, and would give the fledgling Romania the best chance at unity. He also advocated an aristocratic republic as the best form of governance, clearly believing in guarding the power of the boyars.

Catargiu was appointed to the position of minister of finances by Alexandru Ioan Cuza. He quickly gained acclaim for his oratorical skills and became the focal point of the Conservative Party. He did very little to actually organize the party, instead depending on his own charisma and ideals to give the party focus. Cuza, despite not agreeing with the conservative doctrine and even seeing Catargiu as an adversary of sorts, recognized his abilities and the power of his followers and chose Catargiu as prime minister of the newly formed union between Wallachia and Moldavia.

On 22 January 1862, Catargiu was sworn in as the first prime minister of Romania, ruling from Bucharest. As prime minister, Catargiu hoped to reorganize and simplify the administration. He formed four administrative divisions, two in what had been Wallachia and two in Moldavia. He placed the four divisions under the supervision of a minister of the interior and unified the financial and judicial departments under the central government. Arguably the most important act of his rule was his order to begin a railroad in Moldavia that would link the two provinces and greatly aid unification. He also continued his support for the "old order" and claimed that large estates were historically sanctioned and were solely the property of the boyars. He also clamped down on rioting in the cities, censored the press, and refused to allow large assemblies to meet. He denied the right of the people to meet on the Bucharest "Field of Liberty" to commemorate the Revolution of 1848, an act which garnered him much animosity.

== Assassination ==
One week after the "Field of Liberty" Incident, on 8 June 1862, Catargiu was shot and killed at close range when leaving a parliamentary meeting. The assassin was never apprehended, despite the efforts of the police force. The killing left the Conservative Party without a strong leader or sense of direction. They quickly lost power, as Catargiu was replaced by Nicolae Kretzulescu, a much more progressive politician.

Despite Catargiu's relative unpopularity, his memory was celebrated by the Romanians. A statue of him was placed opposite the Bibescu Vodă Park in Bucharest, near the Metropolitan Tower, close to where he was killed. It stood from 1900 until 1984; in 2001, it was restored, albeit without the original pedestal.

== See also ==
- List of unsolved murders
