= Nicolae Rosetti-Bălănescu =

Romanian politician and lawyer

Prince Nicolae Rosetti-Bălănescu

Minister of Foreign Affairs of Principality of Romania
- In office 29 August 1863 – 29 October 1865
- Monarch: Alexandru Ioan Cuza
- Preceded by: Ioan Grigore Ghica
- Succeeded by: Alexandru Papadopol-Calimah

Personal details
- Born: 6 December 1827 Iași, Moldavia
- Died: 11 May 1884 (aged 56) Paris, France
- Resting place: Montparnasse Cemetery, Paris
- Spouse: Princess Olga Rosetti-Bălănescu
- Children: Princess Elena Rosetti-Bălănescu
- Education: University of Paris

Prince Nicolae Rosetti-Bălănescu (6 December 1827 – 11 May 1884) was a lawyer and Romanian politician who served as the Minister of Foreign Affairs of the Principality of Romania from 29 August 1863 until 29 October 1865.

Rosetti-Bălănescu was born in Iași, Moldavia. He came from a larger aristocratic Rosetti family, which to distinguish themselves split into four smaller families: Rosetti-Solescu, Rosetti-Roznovanu, Rosetti-Tescanu and Rosetti-Bălănescu. He studied in Paris at Lycée Henri-IV and then at the Paris Law Faculty, after which he returned to Romania. His wife, Olga, divorced him and then married another diplomat, Petre Mavrogheni. Towards the end of his life he went back to Paris, where he died. He is buried at Montparnasse Cemetery in Paris.

== See also ==
- Foreign relations of Romania
