= Dimitrie P. Vioreanu =

Romanian jurist and politician

Dimitrie P. Vioreanu (1831–October 24, 1881) was a Romanian jurist and politician.

Vioreanu studied in his native country, completing his education abroad. He taught at the law faculty of the University of Bucharest from its establishment until his death. He served three terms as Justice Minister: August-October 1863, February-April 1870, and April 1876. In his last years, he was lead prosecutor at the Court of Cassation.
