= Nicolae Kretzulescu =

Romanian politician and physician

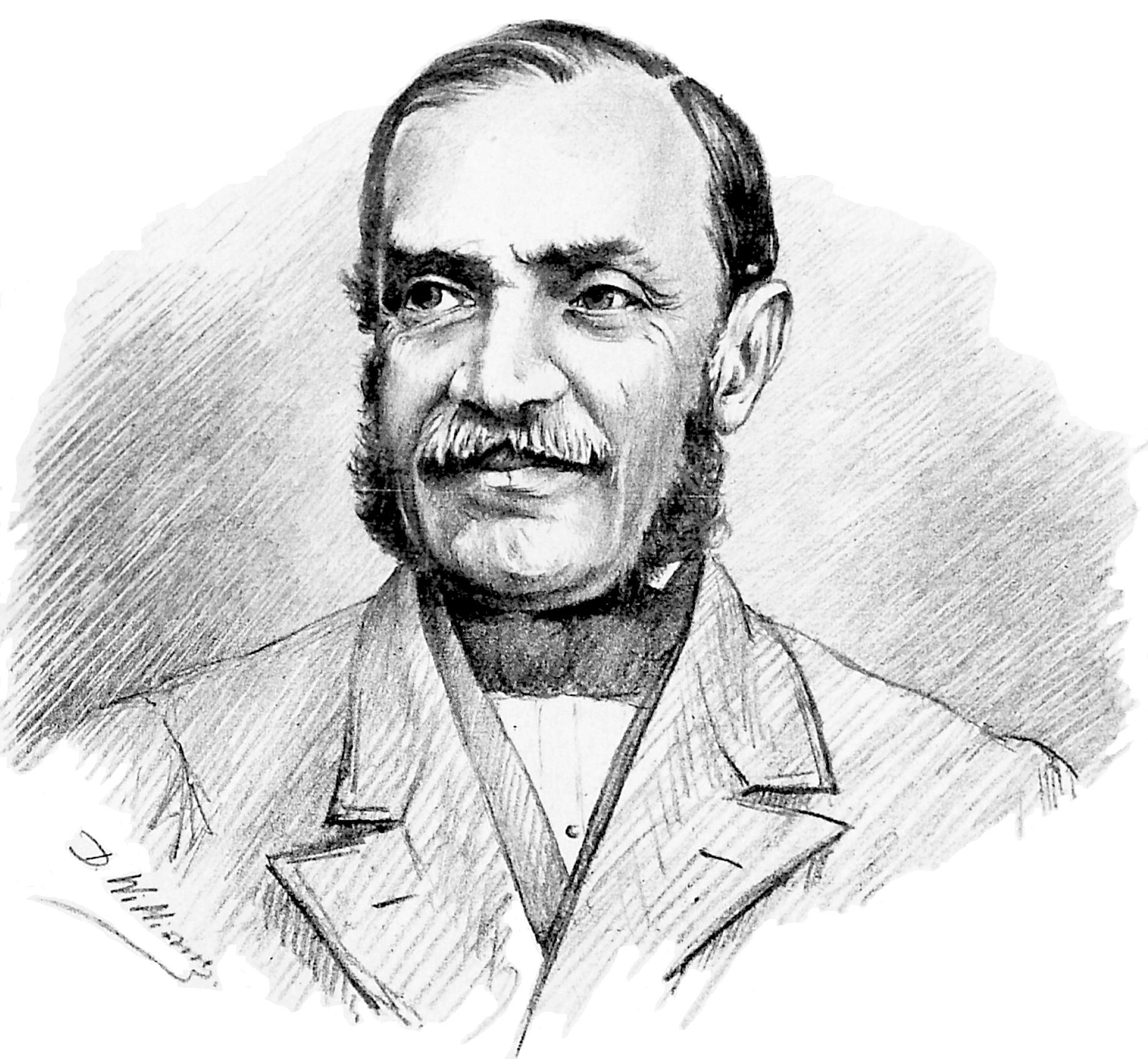

2nd Prime Minister of Romania
- In office 24 June 1862 – 11 October 1863
- Monarch: Alexandru Ioan Cuza
- Preceded by: Barbu Catargiu
- Succeeded by: Mihail Kogălniceanu
- In office 14 June 1865 – 11 February 1866
- Monarch: Alexandru Ioan Cuza
- Preceded by: Constantin Bosianu
- Succeeded by: Ion Ghica

9th President of the Senate of Romania
- In office 13 December 1889 – 9 June 1890
- Monarch: Carol I
- Preceded by: Ioan Emanoil Florescu
- Succeeded by: Ioan Emanoil Florescu

Personal details
- Born: 1 March 1812 Bucharest, Wallachia
- Died: 26 June 1900 (aged 88) Leordeni, Argeș County, Kingdom of Romania
- Resting place: Bellu Cemetery, Bucharest
- Party: National Liberal Party
- Children: Anna Kretzulescu-Lahovary
- Parents: Ana 'Anica' Câmpineanu; Alexandru Kretzulescu
- Relatives: Constantin A. Kretzulescu, Scarlat Kretzulescu (brothers)
- Education: University of Paris

Nicolae Kretzulescu (Romanian pronunciation: [nikoˈla.e kret͡suˈlesku], surname also spelled Crețulescu; 1 March 1812 – 26 June 1900) was a Wallachian, later Romanian politician and physician. An aristocrat and member of the Kretzulescu family, he served two terms as Prime Minister of Romania: from 1862 to 1863, and from 1865 to 1866. He was also elected to the Romanian Academy, serving as its 3rd president from 1872 to 1873.

Born in Bucharest, Kretzulescu studied medicine in Paris, having Gustave Flaubert as a colleague. After graduating from the medical school, he returned to Romania and practiced medicine in the capital city. He was especially involved in organizing the public healthcare system, being also an initiator of medical education in Wallachia. He conceived several instructional guides, one notable work of his being the translation of Jean Cruveilhier's manual of anatomy. Along with Carol Davila, he founded the National School of Medicine and Pharmacy (1857), that would soon become the Carol Davila University of Medicine and Pharmacy.

Nicolae Kretzulescu was also involved in politics, taking an active part in the 1848 revolution in the Romanian principalities. A member of the Liberal faction, he first became prime minister after the assassination of Barbu Catargiu, under ruler Alexandru Ioan Cuza. He avoided debating the issue of land reform, at that time the most contentious subject in Romanian politics; instead, Kretzulescu focused on unifying the public health system, creating the Directorate General of the Public Archive, and establishing a Council for Public Instruction. Additionally, he laid the groundwork for further laws secularizing the property of monasteries.

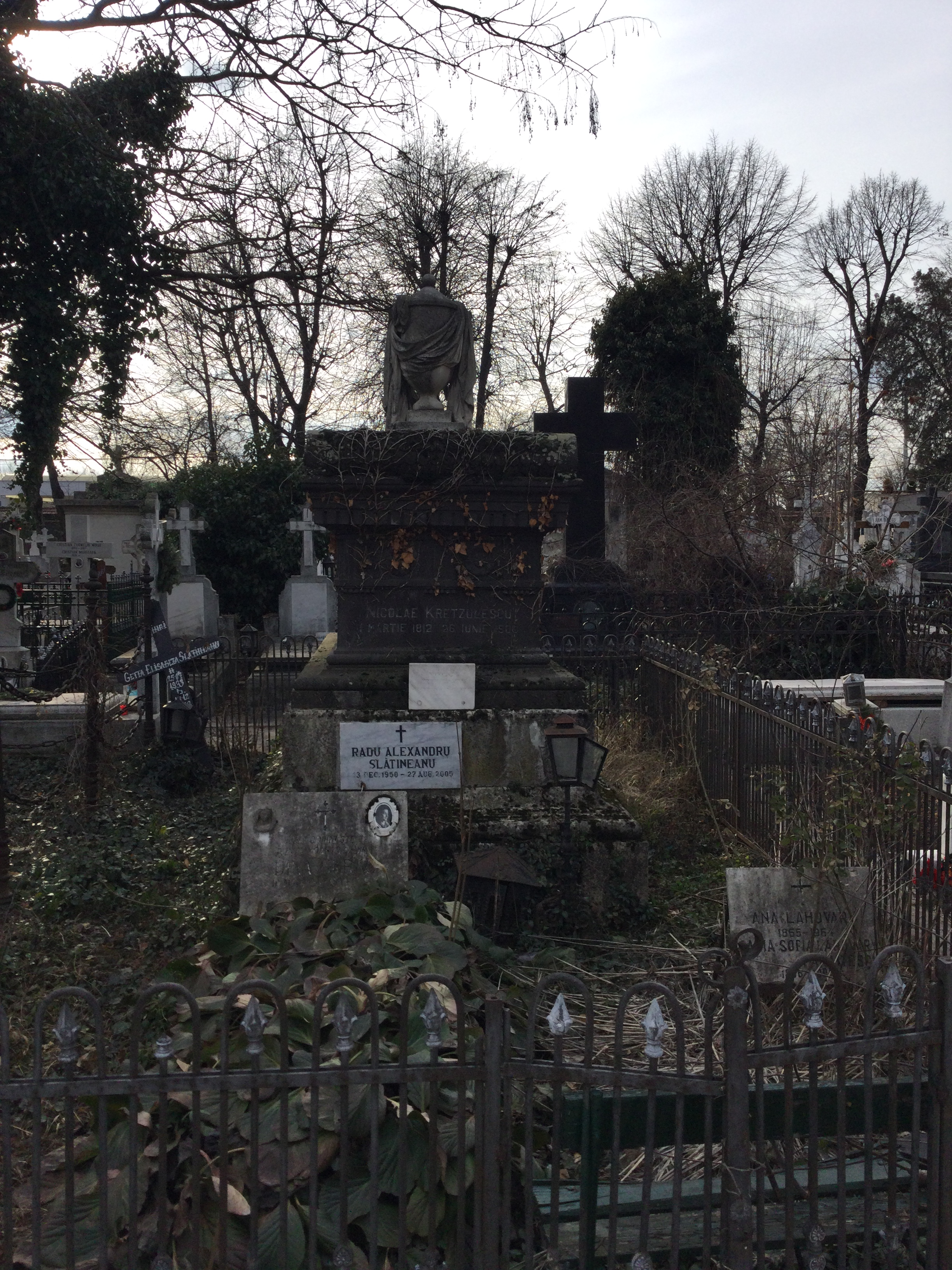
Grave at Bellu Cemetery
