= Alexandru Papadopol-Calimah =

Romanian politician and scholar (1833–1898)

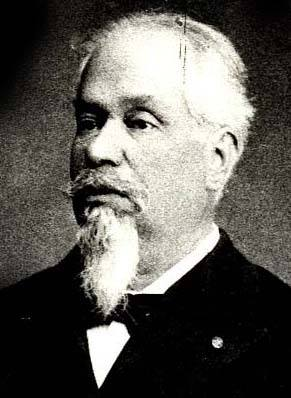

Minister of Foreign Affairs of the Principality of Romania
- In office October 17, 1865 – February 10, 1866
- Monarch: Alexandru Ioan Cuza
- Prime Minister: Nicolae Kretzulescu
- Preceded by: Nicolae Rosetti-Bălănescu
- Succeeded by: Ion Ghica

Minister of Culture and Public Instruction
- In office November 16 – November 24, 1868
- Monarch: Carol I
- Prime Minister: Dimitrie Ghica
- Preceded by: Dimitrie Gusti
- Succeeded by: Alexandru Crețescu

Personal details
- Born: January 15, 1833 Tecuci, Moldavia
- Died: June 6, 1898 (aged 65) Tecuci, Kingdom of Romania
- Party: National Party; Junimea; Conservative Party
- Spouse: Amelia Plitos
- Relations: Scarlat Callimachi (grandfather); Constantine Mourouzis (uncle); Alexandros Kallimachis (uncle)
- Children: Elena Papadopol-Calimah; Paul Papadopol-Calimah
- Occupation: Civil servant, jurist, historian, philologist, journalist, landowner

Alexandru Papadopol-Calimah (with spelling variants Papadopolu, Papadopulo, Papadopul, as well as Callimach, Callimac, and Callimachi; January 15, 1833 – June 18, 1898) was a Moldavian-born Romanian historian, jurist, and journalist, who served as the Minister of Foreign Affairs and Minister of Culture of the Principality of Romania. As a maternal member of the Callimachi family, he had high aristocratic origins, but was a commoner on his father's side; he spent most of his life in the Moldavian town of Tecuci, whose history was a focus of his academic activity. He joined the Moldavian civil service in 1855, as a Spatharios in service to Prince Grigore Alexandru Ghica, and participated in applying Ghica's reforms. Papadopol-Calimah consequently discarded his Greek-and-Hellenized background to become an exponent of Romanian nationalism, supporting a political unification between Moldavia and Wallachia, which came about in 1859. He first served in the unified administration established by Domnitor Alexandru Ioan Cuza, rising from Prefect to State Council member, then to cabinet minister. Throughout his career, he remained closely aligned with Vasile Alecsandri and Mihail Kogălniceanu, and later also with Bogdan Petriceicu Hasdeu.

Papadopol-Calimah's position as head of Foreign Affairs (1865–1866) saw attempts to break the Principality farther away from the Ottoman Empire, but also witnessed a final crisis of the Cuza regime. He opposed the "monstrous coalition" which deposed Cuza in February 1866, and considered withdrawing from politics altogether. He eventually returned to serve in the Assembly of Deputies as a perennial representative of Tecuci County—moving from left-wing Cuzism to a right-wing conservative position, fully consolidated when he became a follower of the Junimea club. During this transition, Papadopol-Calimah returned as Minister of Culture, serving as such for only eight days in 1868. He was fully reconciled with Domnitor Carol I in the 1870s, endorsing his establishment of a Romanian Kingdom, and following Junimea into the larger Conservative Party.

Known in the 1860s as one of Romania's first legal historians, and a co-author of the first Romanian Civil Code, Papadopol-Calimah diversified his scholarly contributions in the 1870s and '80s, when he was inducted by the Romanian Academy. His works were recognized as overall well researched and aesthetically pleasing, but also tinged by controversy regarding their cultural importance and their heavy reliance on other authors—allegedly, to the point of plagiarism. Papadopol-Calimah was a biographer, genealogist, medievalist, social historian, philologist and classical scholar, with pioneering contributions such as a sourcebook on the Dacians and their history. His promised work of political history explaining Cuza's reign never materialized, but he left manuscript memoirs covering that same period.

== Biography ==
=== Origins and early life ===
Papadopol-Calimah was born in Tecuci, Moldavia, which was at the time a tributary state of the Ottoman Empire. Through his mother Eufrosina (died 1878), he was a member of the Callimachi family, linking him to both Moldavian boyardom and Phanariote aristocracy of Istanbul. According to his own research, the Callimachis were originally from Orhei County in Bessarabia; this claim was rejected by historian Alexandru D. Xenopol, who suggests instead that they were from Bukovina, but was validated later on by genealogist Ștefan S. Gorovei. Alexandru belonged to the fully Hellenized mainline of that clan, the more junior Callimachis having endured as Moldavian and Romanian; his grandfather was Scarlat Callimachi, who was thrice the Prince of Moldavia, between 1806 and 1819, also serving briefly as Prince of Wallachia in 1821. This also made him great-grandson of Prince Alexander Callimachi, and great-great-grandson of Prince John Theodore Callimachi; his uncles included Prince Constantine Mourouzis and John Callimachi, Dragoman of the Fleet. Scarlat's wife, and Alexandru's grandmother, was the daughter of Wallachian Prince Nicholas Mavrogenes.

Prince Scarlat is described by historian Sorin Iftimi as "the most Hellenized among the Callimachis' progeny, though he was [also] proud of mentioning his Romanian roots." Deposed by his Ottoman overlords during the Greek War of Independence, he was exiled, with his entire family, to Bolu, where he died ("poisoned and decapitated"); the surviving Callimachis were allowed passage back to Moldavia in 1825. Meanwhile, Dragoman John had been executed for supporting the Filiki Eteria, leading Papadopol-Calimah's maternal cousins to seek a permanent refuge in the Russian Empire. Scandal followed shortly after, when Eufrosina fell in love with their ship captain, Nicephorus (or Nechifor) Papadopol. In a 1987 biography, philosopher Ionel Necula proposes that the events took place while the Callimachis were sailing home to Moldavia on Papadopol's ship; he also notes that they remained married into old age, with Alexandru as their only progeny. This was subsequently contradicted by archival research, which notes that the couple was married in 1832, and was separated by 1858—when Nicephorus had moved to Kishinev, where he died in 1862. Such records also show that Alexandru had a sister, Smaranda Panu-Calimah (1835–1892), as well as two living brothers, Scarlat and Aristide (a fourth Papadopol son, Nechifor, died in childhood).

Necula notes that Papadopol-Calimah never emphasized his own "princely origin". During his lifetime, the family maintained a high profile in the Ottoman Empire through Alexandru's uncle, diplomat Alexandros Kallimachis. The latter died in 1875 in the French town of Mennecy, without leaving anything to the Papadopol children—possibly because of intrigues by his French relatives, who never informed any of the Romanian Callimachis that they stood to inherit. The Romanian family was instead amassing land in and around Stănișești. Nicephorus had leased land from the local Moldavian Orthodox church in 1810, and built another church in 1838. After a lengthy litigation between Eufrosina and her Palladi in-laws, Alexandru received a fourth of Stănișești. He also owned a "modern villa" in Tecuci, locally famous for being decked in morning glory and Chinese wisteria.

Little is known about the future scholar's early life—in an 1897 dictionary article, Dimitrie R. Rosetti noted that "biographical details are lacking." As his memoirs reveal, by 1855 he was one of the "educated young men" called upon to serve Moldavia in the administration formed around Grigore Alexandru Ghica, the reformist Prince: "In order to make me take an office, Voivode Ghica honored me with the rank of Spatharios, which was the first rank I ever held." He was included as a Spatharios in the Moldavian register of ranks on May 5, 1855, "for services rendered". His literary debut also took place in 1855, with an article published by Vasile Alecsandri's România Literară. It criticized re-Latinization efforts and pleaded for the preservation of the spoken "language of our parents". According to Papadopol-Calimah, the core Romanian lexis was superior in terms of expressivity and beauty.

In April–May 1856, Papadopol-Calimah was head of a political bureau at the Moldavian Foreign Ministry (or Postelnicie), and took part with Mihail Kogălniceanu and Dimitrie Ralet in legislating freedom of the press throughout Moldavia. He was becoming noted as a critic of slavery and a champion of its Romani victims; in February 1856, Kogălniceanu's almanac featured his condemnation of slave-holding peoples as unworthy of contact with civilized ones. The young man was an early champion of Romanian nationalism and the National Party, advocating for a political union between Moldavia and Wallachia: "his very entry into public life is linked to this event". As he himself reports, by then he was introducing himself with greeting cards that carried the "arms of united Romania", and wore neckties fashioned into the Romanian tricolor. In June 1856, Stéoa Dunărei hosted his manifesto calling on Moldavians and Wallachians to embrace a shared appellation as "Romanians", with "the unification of Romania [as] the singular and unanimous expectation of the people". The same month, he joined Kogălniceanu and others on a scientific panel set up by Prince Ghica, which was to assess whether the Chronicle of Huru was an authentic medieval document. As he explained in an 1883 article, a report on the issue was never presented by Kogălniceanu.

In 1857, after Ghica's ouster, Papadopol-Calimah joined the opposition to Nicolae Vogoride's conservative regime. Stripped of his job in government, he was forced to leave Iași, and picked the northern town of Baia, "on my lady cousin's estate", as his place of exile. He signaled his continued insubordination by once leaving for Bârlad, where he convinced a taraf orchestra to perform the banned unionist anthem, Hora Unirii. The conservatives were finally on the retreat during 1858. National unification relied on the January 1859 election of a Moldavian, Alexandru Ioan Cuza, as Domnitor over both countries. Upon his confirmation, Cuza, who was himself cousins with the non-Hellenized Callimachis, rewarded Papadopol-Calimah's services by appointing him as Prefect of Tecuci County. He served as such between May 12 and August 18, 1859. His job included overseeing the Moldavian army's passage across the Siret, on its way to the unified camp of Florești (May 1859). During that interval, he witnessed a diplomatic conflict between the United Principalities and the Austrian Empire, which included Cuza's decision to mass troops in Ploiești. Papadopol-Calimah later confessed that this was a diversionary maneuver intended to help the French Empire in its Italian war with Austria.

=== Minister and polemicist ===
The first Civil Code of Romania, in the edition put out by Vasile Boerescu

In 1860, the young man married Amelia Plitos (or Pletosu), a local boyaress. This made him the posthumous son-in-law of Grigore Plitos, a peasant famous for his good looks and charms, who allegedly owed his raising into the nobility to the affections of Marioara Sturdza, Moldavia's dowager princess in the 1840s. This made Papadopol-Calimah the brother-in-law of Ruxandra Plitos-Docan-Tomazichi, whose Iași townhouse doubled as the Prussian consulate. Writer Dimitrie C. Ollănescu-Ascanio, who was briefly the mayor of Tecuci and befriended the Plitoses, recalls that Amelia was attractive, though myopic, whereas her husband, though of "delicate" upbringing, had "irregular features and pockmarks on his cheeks". Two years after his marriage, Papadopol-Calimah was traveling through the Kingdom of Bavaria alongside Alecsandri and journalist Abdolonyme Ubicini. While in Munich, the three men began work on a pioneer work of Romanian grammar for French readers, which was eventually published in 1863 under the pen name "V. Mircesco" (which was otherwise only used by and for Alecsandri).

The period also saw Papadopol-Calimah being attracted into debates about Cuza's land reform project, which also included setting up a land reserve from nationalized monastic estates. Already in 1859, he and Kogălniceanu co-wrote the Romanian answer to the Sublime Porte (which represented the interests of Greek monks). In it, they demanded that such secularization be viewed as Cuza's prerogative as an autonomous monarch. As a member of Cuza's State Council from January 1864, Papadopol-Calimah was soon involved in the passage of reform bills countersigned by the Domnitor. He adopted a conservative position during the debates of August 1864: with Gheorghe Apostoleanu, he voted against the immediate abolition of tithes and corvées. He had an ancillary role in the passage of land-reform legislation, which, though limited in scope, had revolutionary clauses, describing the peasants as natural co-owners of the land they toiled.

With Apostoleanu, Alexandru Crețeanu, Ion Strat, and George D. Vernescu, Papadopol-Calimah also served on the commission drafting the original Civil Code of Romania—essentially transferring the Napoleonic Code into Romanian law. His first (and for long only) two published works were monographs on the French Court of Cassation, both appearing at Iași in 1862. These contributions also looked into the origins of Vlach law, which Papadopol-Calimah viewed as echoes from the Roman statutes. As noted by jurist George Popovici, the evidence for this was questionable: in claiming that the Romanians' "oath on the furrow" had such an origin, Papadopol-Calimah had used a fragment passed on from Cincius, who referred to a custom that had already died out in Republican Rome. In 1866, Bogdan Petriceicu Hasdeu argued that Papadopol-Calimah had been one of only three authors to have theorized "on the origin of our public law"; the other two were Ferdinand Neigebaur and George Missail. Also according to Hasdeu, the contribution was "barely the start of an introduction", but seminal.

Papadopol-Calimah was to be Cuza's final Minister of Foreign Affairs, serving under Prime Minister Nicolae Kretzulescu from October 17, 1865. He took office while Cuza had taken a medical leave at Bad Ems. One of his first acts of office was to reprimand Mehmed Fuad Pasha, the Ottoman Vizier, who had endorsed the anti-Cuza riots in Bucharest. He also made a point of signing Romania to the International Telegraph Convention and the Prut River Convention, both separately from the Ottoman Empire. According to political scientist Valeriu Stan, Papadopol-Calimah was called upon to curtail Cuza's incompetence, as one of the few professionals who still sided with the Domnitor. Stan sees Papadopol-Calimah, Constantin Bosianu, and Dimitrie Cariagdi, as loyalists "whose devotion, devoid of any corresponding political qualities, proved incapable of handling the nation's needs for governance."

Cuza's internal policies had alienated both the conservative "Whites" and left-liberal "Reds", leading to the formation of a "monstrous coalition" that ousted him on February 11, 1866. Papadopol-Calimah later reported that he had been informed of a looming coup, specifically during a casual meeting with Annibale Strambio, the Italian Consul: "Sir, your country sits atop a volcano". In his account of the affair, he claimed that Cuza was being undermined by "pretenders to the throne", who expected Cuza's downfall to restore Moldavia and Wallachia as separate countries, with separate thrones, and, as such, with more chances for them to obtain appointment as princes. The deposed Minister found the February coup intolerable. He maintained a steady correspondence with the exiled Cuza, informing him on the political developments in Romania. In September 1866, he spoke of February 11 as an act of "darkest treason", and confessed that he intended to quit politics and move to the countryside.

=== Cuza loyalist, Junimist, and academician ===
Papadopol-Calimah had returned to active politics before the election of November 1866, and proudly informed the exiled Domnitor of his success in the race of Tecuci, where he took a unanimous vote in the Second College—an expression of Tecuci's loyalty to Cuza. In Chamber, he rallied with the center-left, and as such helped topple Ion Ghica's cabinet, which had refused to provide funds for public celebration marking the 1859 union. While pursuing his activities in government, Papadopol-Calimah had joined a cultural club known as Junimea. The exact dating of his first presence there is disputed, and hinges on the accuracy of claims advanced by Junimea co-founder Vasile Pogor; Pogor argues that Papadopol-Calimah was there for the first-ever meeting, which he dates to autumn 1863. Junimist Nicolae Gane also places Papadopol-Calimah among the early members, noting that he attended sessions held in Bucharest, long before the club has been more firmly established in Iași. In a letter he addressed to Cuza in early 1867, Papadopol-Calimah again reported that he intended to withdraw from public life altogether, and only serve Romanians as a political historian; he planned to write "our critical history from 1859 to that night of February 10/11 1866"—though he never did. Necula believes that his enduring popularity made him a sought-after presence in government under the new regime, leading to his appointment as Dimitrie Ghica's Minister of Culture and Public Instruction. He only served for eight days, from November 16 to November 24, 1868.

As noted by literary historian Augustin Z. N. Pop, Kogălniceanu, as Ghica's head of Internal Affairs, was largely responsible for prolonging Papadopol-Calimah's career in politics, as one of several favorites of his, "patriots known primarily for their revolutionary work and their guaranteed honesty". As early as June 1867, Kogălniceanu had attempted to coax his friend into taking hold of the Culture Ministry, thereafter insisting that he should not resign. The acceptance of a ministerial office also implied that Papadopol-Calimah was no longer a fully committed champion of the Cuzist cause, being charmed into compliance by a new Domnitor, the Prussian-born Carol of Hohenzollern. During the legislative election of March 1869, he ran and won as a government candidate for the Assembly of Deputies in Tecuci County, replacing Constantin Grădișteanu (in January, he had won the primary against Nicolae Hagi Nicola). He now rallied more closely with Junimea, which now doubled as a right-wing political faction, and which he followed in and out of the Conservative Party.

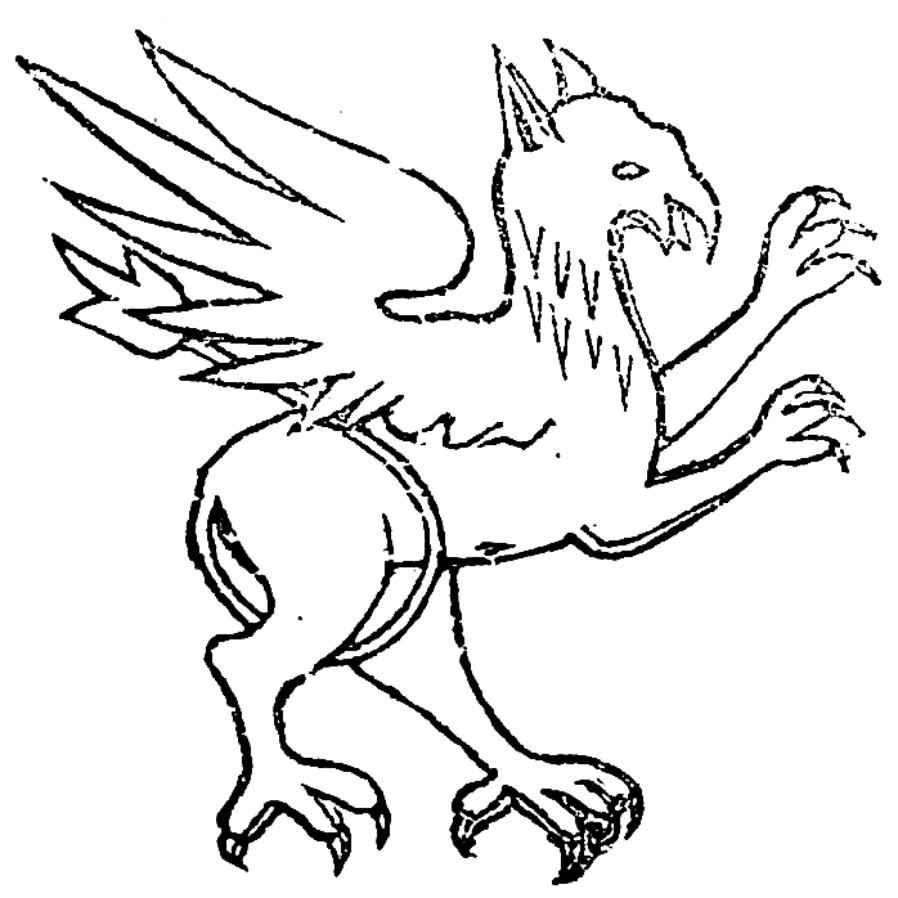
A "Dacian griffin" (griffonulŭ dacicŭ), drawn by Bogdan Petriceicu Hasdeu for Columna lui Traianŭ (November 1872)

During the early-to-mid 1870s, Papadopol-Calimah was focusing more on scholarly pursuits. From March 1873, he signed on as founder and co-editor of Revista Contimporană, alongside Anghel Demetriescu, Ștefan C. Michăilescu, Dimitrie Petrino, and Ronetti Roman. In 1872, Hasdeu's own journal, Columna lui Traianŭ, began serializing Papadopol-Calimah's sourcebook on Dacia, the Getae, and the Dacians, as Scrieri vechi perdute atingetóre de Dacia; it covered the eighteen centuries between Scylax of Caryanda and Nikephoros Blemmydes, provided an inventory of lost books, and reviewed fragments from outside the classical world, including writings by Movses Khorenatsi. His investigations into classical antiquity were also reflected in his documenting a trove found outside Galați in or before 1872, from which he kept one golden stater. He donated this item to the academy in 1879, alongside a Greek drachma from the finds at Histria.

Papadopol-Calimah remained a regular at Columna to at least 1876, while also publishing in Revista Contimporană. The latter hosted his biography of Kaisarios Dapontes (1875), noted by Elias Schwartzfeld for its unusual detail on Jewish Romanian history—namely that Dapontes had favored rabbinical courts over dissenters, to the point of having a "heretical" (possibly Sabbatean) hakham put to death. His other focus was the 18th-century Moldavian polymath, Dimitrie Cantemir. As he wrote to fellow researcher Gheorghe Sion in 1877, he had a project to translate all of Cantemir's non-Romanian writings; his own contribution was one of Cantemir's genealogical studies, translated from a Greek manuscript.

Papadopol-Calimah's activity as a researcher and literary figure lo enticed renewed controversy. In September 1876, he was elected a full member of the Romanian Academy. The event was poorly welcomed even by Junimea: in one of his columns, Junimist Mihai Eminescu argued that Papadopol-Calimah was only an academician because the institution had already inducted (the implicitly mediocre) Sion and V. A. Urechia. A generation later, Petrovici similarly proposed that Papadopol-Calimah was embraced by the academy "either because of his princely origin, or because [it] lacked trained historians". Necula himself acknowledges that both Eminescu and Petrovici were possibly right, since Papadopol-Calimah's research at that stage was "not all that impressive". Around that time, Papadopol-Calimah's wife was running a literary club in Tecuci, whose only confirmed members were Ollănescu-Ascanio and Theodor Șerbănescu. According to scholar-memoirist Ion Petrovici, Amelia was by then the lover of Tecuci Prefect Tache Anastasiu. Their affair was allegedly known to all locals, who were disturbed by the contrast between her delicate nature and the coarseness of Anastasiu and his political machine.

=== Independence War and Kingdom creation ===
Papadopol-Calimah spent middle-age as a perennial deputy for Tecuci. The Papadopol-Calimah family supported the national cause during the Romanian War of Independence (1877–1877, part of the larger war with the Ottomans). In 1877, the Brătianu cabinet appointed the historian as its commissioner in Tecuci and Tutova, tasked with ensuring supplies and safe passage for the Imperial Russian Army. Unable to leave Bucharest, he delegated most of his functions to a younger politician and personal friend, Lupu Kostaki; the latter, an avowed Russophobe, moved to prevent the troops from establishing hospitals inside populated centers, and prevented Russian soldiers from trafficking in illegal tobacco. Alexandru's wife Amelia and his mother-in-law Elena Plitos ran the military fundraising effort in Tecuci, assisted by brother-in-law Coton Plitos, who was serving as Prefect of Cahul. With Kogălniceanu returning at Internal Affairs, Papadopol-Calimah was considered for fulfilling a government mission in Turnu Măgurele and Nikopol.

According to his writer friend Alecsandri, Papadopol-Calimah, a "modest and hard-working man", fully redeemed himself with his later contribution, "the only one among the academicians who puts in more work than is required of him". He supplemented his output as a historian with Notițe istorice despre orașul Tecuci ("Historical Notices Regarding Tecuci Town"), which became a standard feature of Romanian geographical textbooks. He returned in Analele Academiei in 1878 with a philological essay about Dacian botany, which he read through Pedanius Dioscorides and Apuleius, also proposing Dacian etymologies of Romanian plant names. By April 1880, he was also involved in debates over spelling reform, a project advanced by the Junimists. Alongside Gheorghe Marin Fontanin and Bishop Melchisedec Ștefănescu, he endorsed and obtained the preservation of special digraphs in neologisms (such as a voiceless h in theologie). His other proposal was to merge duplicate letters that, he argued, did not indicate actual gemination, but only grammatical function (as with înnoire); this was fought against by Fontanin, and defeated by a vote.

Papadopol-Calimah's political activities included running as an independent in the elections of May 1879, taking a seat in the legislature which was tasked with revising the 1866 Constitution of Romania. From May 1881, Romania was reestablished as an independent kingdom, with Carol as its inaugural King. Papadopol-Calimah was by then included in the royals' circle: in February 1879, he reported to Alecsandri about having had a "very pleasant and endearing conversation" with Carol. In April 1881, Alecsandri hosted a banquet at Hotel Boulevard in Bucharest, inviting Junimists Papadopol-Calimah and Titu Maiorescu alongside their adversary Urechia. The conversation turned to memories of the coup against Cuza—with Maiorescu's diary suggesting that Papadopol-Calimah was a "liar" when it came to this topic. Along with the other Junimists in Parliament, in autumn 1881 Papadopol-Calimah signed the platform which celebrated the kingdom's proclamation.

In 1882, as a regular at the Junimist magazine Convorbiri Literare, Papadopol-Calimah investigated the 15th-century Moldavian regent, Ciubăr Vodă, separating the historical figure from Alecsandri's literary character of the same name. During December 1883, he spoke at the academy about a 17th-century Phanariote intellectual, Alexander Mavrokordatos the Exaporite. According to scholar Alexandru A. C. Sturdza, this contribution was entirely plagiarized from Epaminonda Stamatiade. Sturdza still commends Papadopol-Calimah for not including any questionable details on the Exaporite that could be sourced to Cantemir. Also in 1883, Papadopol-Calimah found and published in Convorbiri Literare the original procès-verbal of 1859, whereby all National Party factions declared Cuza as their preferred candidate. Following Alecsandri's intercession, Junimea put out his overview of Occitan literature. In December 1884 and January 1885, the journal also hosted his recollections of life at the princely court of Iași; it drew much praise from Samson Bodnărescu, who claimed that Papadopol-Calimah had ushered in a "new era", in which historical notices merged with the "aesthetic pleasure" of well-structured narratives. Several other works followed, including monographs on Nicholas Mavrocordatos, Gheorghe Ștefan, and Costache Negri; his work as a translator from both Russian and Greek covered an account about The Tale of Igor's Campaign, as well as fragments from Lucian's Parliament of the Gods. He was also working on a book of memoirs covering 1853 to 1888, which is kept as a manuscript by the Academy Library.

=== Final years ===
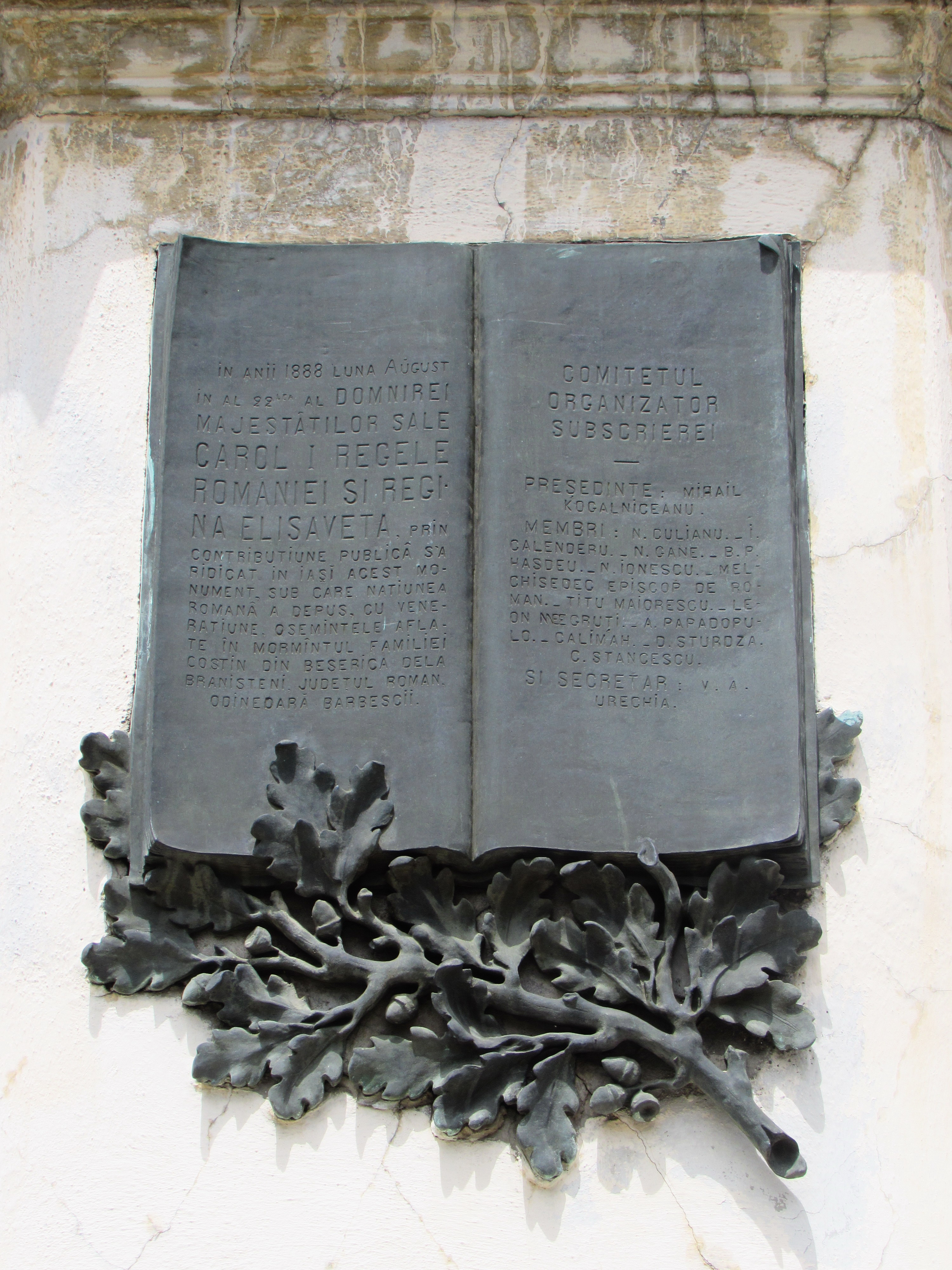
Book-shaped plaque on the Miron Costin statue, mentioning Papadopol-Calimah (as A. Papadopulo-Calimah)

Under Carol's consolidated monarchy, Papadopol-Calimah remained a relatively popular figure in politics. Running for the elite First College in Tecuci during the race of April 1883, he took all possible 42 votes. In June 1884 he also co-sponsored legislation which set aside a Crown Estate for use by the Romanian dynasty. His other activity in the Assembly focused on cultural affairs, such as his proposal to honor poet Grigore Alexandrescu with a state funeral, in 1885. This initiative of his garnered praise from a wide array of public figures—including Alecsandri, who noted that Papadopol-Calimah had rescued Alexandrescu from complete oblivion. Amused by Urechia's attempts to document every aspect of history, in 1887 Papadopol-Calimah and Kogălniceanu resorted to a prank, announcing him that an archeological dig in Murfatlar had uncovered Ovid's grave; much to their amusement, Urechia publicized this as real news.

Papadopol-Calimah's more serious work also included a description of Botoșani city, included in the 1887 edition of Analele Academiei. It offered detail on the murals of Popăuți Church, which was later used as a source of information by other historians. In February, he was included on a commission tasked with erecting a statue of Miron Costin in Iași (ultimately done by Wladimir Hegel); the other members were Kogălniceanu, Maiorescu, Bishop Melchisedec, Hasdeu, Nicolae Ionescu, Alexandru Odobescu, Leon C. Negruzzi, C. I. Stăncescu, and Dimitrie Sturdza. In parallel, he took a controversial stand against antiquarians working out of Constanța, arguing that Roman inscriptions preserved in its archeological pavilion were "devoid of any historical interest".

The other focus of Papadopol-Calimah activity was on archival research in the Russian Empire. He used these sources in his work on Pavel Kiselyov and the Regulamentul Organic regime, which had functioned in Moldavia and Wallachia during his childhood. The book challenged accounts that Kiselyov had attempted to annex the Principalities to a Greater Russia. Journalist Dumitru Karnabatt used Papadopol-Calimah's finds to argue that Kiselyov had been a "civilized and progressive spirit", whose contribution had contained the "bad habits that had engulfed our country." Also in 1887, Convorbiri Literare put out Papadopol-Calimah's study about the abolition of serfdom in 18th-century Moldavia, with an overview of serfdom, a "barbarian institution", as experienced throughout Romanian territories. According to critical historian Florin Constantiniu, the work was unconvincing, a "makeshift construction" rehashing theories borrowed from Kogălniceanu, Ion Heliade Rădulescu, Alexandru G. Golescu, and Vasile Boerescu. The "only element of newness" was Papadopol-Calimah's claim that Michael the Brave had introduced indentured servitude as a political concession to his then-allies in the Principality of Transylvania.

The historian spent much of the period with Alecsandri, at the latter's manor in Mircești; the aging writer was trying to obtain from Papadopol-Calimah confirmation for his spurious claim of descent from Venetian nobility. Around 1890, Papadopol-Calimah and Radu Rosetti where the two social historians regularly featured in Revista Nouă, put out by Hasdeu as an answer to Convorbiri Literare. From March 18, 1885, to April 5, 1886, Papadopol-Calimah was the Academy Vice President. On March 23, 1890, he returned as Vice President of the academy's Historical Section. In August 1890, he was again at Mircești, representing Bârlad for the burial of his friend Alecsandri; he served a similar function, but on behalf of the academy, at Kogălniceanu's funeral in 1891. His late studies included an 1895 piece in Analele Academiei, wherein he discussed an episode from Moldavian and Muscovite history—namely, the conflict between Sophia Palaiologina and Princess Olena. The monograph misquoted previous paleographic work by Bishop Melchisedec, and wrongly identified Eudoxia Ivanovna, daughter of Ivan the Terrible, as one of Stephen the Great's daughters. With this genealogical overview, he became the first Romanian to draw on information from Sigismund von Herberstein, though he could only access it through Nikolay Karamzin's samples in Russian. From 1896, Papadopol-Calimah's other work was featured in Arhiva Societății Științifice și Literare, founded by Alexandru D. Xenopol and other dissident Junimists.

In January 1895, the aging scholar had been affected by the deaths of his wife Amelia, who succumbed to a heart disease, and daughter Elena. The latter, a sufferer from Pott disease, committed suicide because of the desperation brought on by Amelia's death (officially, her death was recorded as due to a "cerebral congestion"). Lawyer and memoirist Al. Lascarov-Moldovanu recalls seeing Papadopol-Calimah in his final years, after a "terrifying tragedy in his family". The event, he notes, had made Papadopol-Calimah withdrawn, but also kind toward Tecuci's children, whom he greeted with an "incredibly gentle look". The historian died in Tecuci on June 18, 1898, after a long illness. His younger friend Ollănescu-Ascanio communicated the news to their colleagues in the academy.

== Legacy ==
Alexandru's brother Aristide was still alive, settling for a while in Galați—where, in 1887, he was a local councilor and registered National Liberal. Following elections in June 1895, he was serving as president of Tecuci County Council. Alexandru's only surviving child, Paul Papadopol-Calimah (born 1865 or 1866), worked primarily as a clerk, and appeared as a Junimist candidate in the legislative elections of 1912. Paul was additionally an editor of his father's collected works—which he printed in 1908 at Tecuci. He died in Tecuci in 1918, in circumstances that were recorded in a humorous and nostalgic piece by the local writer C. Narly. The Papadopol-Calimah line died out within three generations, but the name was revived by Eufrosina's descendant, American photojournalist Rukmini Callimachi (originally named Sichitiu).

In 1904, historian Nicolae Iorga noted that journalist N. A. Bogdan had copied one of Papadopol-Calimah's Convorbiri studies to complete a chapter of his own history of Iași. According to Necula, the "gentle savant never received much recognition, not in his lifetime and not—least of all—upon his passage into the world of shadows. In any case, his name remained shrouded in a hazy atmosphere". Legal historian George Fotino commented in 1934 that Papadopol-Calimah's "attempts" in that particular field remained "devoid of critical sense, of informative certainty, of perspective". In a 1976 overview of Romanian historical writing, Lucian Boia argued that Papadopol-Calimah was illustrative for the Junimist school in its second, non-polemical, phase; his "well-sourced, primarily medievalist, studies" were also "generally minor, without any overarching vision of their own." According to archeologist Aurora Pețan, who reissued Scrieri pierdute in a 2007 edition, only George Călinescu had so much as mentioned him as a researcher of Dacian history, his contribution generally "ignored, forgotten, almost lost." Since 2000, a bust of the scholar, sculpted by Dan Mateescu, has been located in Tecuci Public Garden.
