= Alecu Beldiman =

Moldavian statesman, translator and poet (1760 – 1826)

Alexandru "Alecu" Beldiman
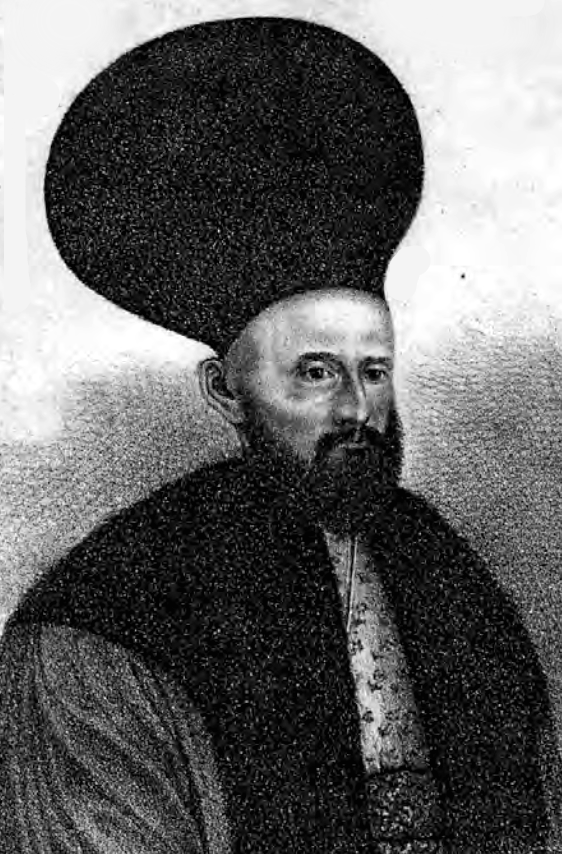
- Beldiman in his boyar clothes, including the kalpak; from the 1861 Alecu Balica edition
- Born: 1760; Iași or Huși, Moldavia
- Died: ca. January 1826 (aged 65)
- Occupations: politician, landowner, inn-keeper, translator
- Writing career
- Period: ca. 1784–1826
- Genres: chronicle, epic poetry, lyric poetry, satire, acrostic
- Literary movement: Neoclassicism, Romanticism

Alecu Beldiman, common rendition of Alexandru Beldiman (Romanian Cyrillic: AлєѯaндрȢ Бєлдимaн), also known as Alecul or Aleco Beldiman (1760 – c. January 1826), was a Moldavian statesman, translator and poet, one of the forerunners of Romanian nationalism. A scion of the boyar elite, he was the eldest son of Vornic Gheorghe Beldiman, and the nephew-in-law of chronicler Enache Kogălniceanu. Alecu himself held high commission in the Moldavian military forces and bureaucracy, but secretly resented the Phanariote regime which had awarded them. He may have affiliated with a loose group known as the "National Party", championing an alliance between Moldavia's independence from the Ottoman Empire and support for the French Republic.

Beldiman's earliest contributions to cultural life probably date back to the 1790s, and originally included translations of French prose and verse drama. He may have contributed an original play, while his brother, Dumitrache Beldiman, helped arrange some of the earliest Moldavian stage performances, as puppet shows. By 1820, Alecu had become the most productive translator in Moldavia, directly contributing to Westernization and the spread of Enlightenment ideas, and also completing a Romanian version of the Odyssey. His works in the field were circulated in print form by Zaharia Carcalechi, or otherwise copied by hand.

Beldiman's anti-Greek sentiment peaked during the 1821, when an invasion by the Sacred Band chased him and other Romanian boyars out of Moldavia. The invasion and its violent aftermath inspired him to write the epic poem Tragodiea Moldovei ("Moldavia's Tragedy"). Although politically significant and comprising picturesque detail, the work was widely dismissed as a sample of exceptionally bad writing. Upon returning home, Beldiman also came into conflict with Prince Ioan Sturdza, who had him imprisoned at Tazlău Monastery in 1824. Poems he wrote during that interval show him as a conservative critic of republican and nationalist propaganda, and display his pity for the lower classes; he was also becoming more supportive of rule by the Ottoman Empire. Though eventually released, he maintained a low profile for the remainder of his life. His family continued to have a role in Moldavian, and later Romanian politics; his grandson Alexandru Beldiman was a journalist.

== Biography ==
=== Origins and early life ===
According to family tradition, Beldiman's ancestors crossed into Moldavia from the Principality of Transylvania. This would make them distant relatives of the Hungarian Counts of Beldi. The immigrants entered historical record in March 1579, when "a certain Beldiman" served as Mayor (Șoltuz) of Suceava. In April 1609, Nichifor Beldiman, recorded in some genealogies as a nemeș (untitled landowner), became Vornic. He later served as Hetman and Logothete, and, in late 1615, led the boyars into rebellion against Prince Ștefan IX Tomșa. He was captured in neighboring Wallachia and beheaded, his remains being disposed of in the Siret River. His two sons continued to hold major boyar ranks, while his daughter married into the Prăjescu family.

During the 18th century, the family lost its economic prosperity and political influence, and came to be regarded as emancipated peasants, rather than as boyars. Isolated in the rural areas of Fălciu County, they were often known by the nickname Mânja. Alecu Beldiman's grandfather, Grigore Mânja Beldiman, rectified the situation. From beginnings as a page at the court of Prince Constantin Cantemir, he became fluent in Ottoman Turkish in Istanbul, where he also befriended Beizadea Dimitrie Cantemir. In 1711, following the Pruth River Campaign, the Cantemirs were chased out of the country; a Beldiman branch also left Moldavia and settled in the Russian Empire.

These events led to the emergence of a Phanariote regime in Moldavia and Wallachia: from ca. 1711, both Danubian Principalities had lost much of their autonomy within the Ottoman Empire; the boyar elite, formed mainly by Greek immigrants, controlled the administration. Grigore Mânja survived this time of troubles, and emerged as a favorite of the early Phanariotes: Nicholas Mavrocordatos and Grigore II Ghica both made used of his services. However, his participation in boyar conspiracies during the third reign of Mihai Racoviță endangered his career and his life. Alecu's father was Gheorghe Beldiman (1724–1792). Orphaned of both parents by 1735, he and his four brothers were virtually adopted by the returning Prince Ghica, who groomed them for high office. Gheorghe amassed a personal fortune while climbing through the ranks, serving as Stolnic in 1763, Ban in 1773, and finally Vornic in 1790. During the Russo-Turkish War of the 1770s, he declared his personal submission to Catherine the Great. He remained a noted figure in the Russophile party, and as a result earned a permanent appointment to the Moldavian Divan in 1774.

Beldiman coat of arms

His son's birth came during the final stages of the Phanariote era. Alecu was born in 1760, either in Iași, the Moldavian capital, or in the smaller town of Huși. His maternal family was Greek. His mother, Maria, was the daughter of "publican Lefter" from Istanbul; her sister was married to Enache Kogălniceanu, the Moldavian chronicler and social reformer. The couple had an older daughter, Anastasia, and three younger sons: Iancu, Filip, and Dumitrache. Early on, Alecu became fluent in Greek and more unusually for his generation, also in French. He was educated at home and in private Greek schools—unlike Dumitrache, who was a graduate of the Princely Academy.

The future chronicler climbed steadily through the boyar hierarchy, becoming Ceauș in the Moldavian military forces in 1785; he was Serdar in 1789. At age 34, Alecu became a Paharnic at the princely court of Michael Drakos Soutzos, before being moved to serve as Ispravnic in Neamț County. In 1800, under Prince Constantine Ypsilantis, Beldiman was appointed Pârcălab of Galați. Following his father's death, he became sole owner of several estates. One was Cornești, outside Iași; two others, Iezereni and Tețcureni, were in Bessarabia. Beldiman was married three times, but scholars provide contradictory details on this issue. Literary historian George Călinescu reports that Beldiman's first wife, name unknown, was a member of the Romano clan; the second was Ileana, sister of the Logothete and poet Costache Conachi, making him in-laws with Nicolae Vogoride, future Kaymakam of Moldavia. Genealogist Vasile Panopol corrects such accounts, noting that Ileana (or Elena) Conachi was Beldiman's first wife, followed by Elena Costandache. A sister of the Spatharios Gheorghe Costandache, she bought him an urban estate in Iași; they were still married to each other in 1823, but she presumably died shortly after. Both authors agree that Beldiman's final, childless, marriage was to Elena Greceanu.

Theater historian Ioan Massoff notes that Bedliman's earliest contributions to drama include his 1784 rendition of Pietro Metastasio's La clemenza di Tito—as Milosârdia lui Tit. Researcher Nicolae N. Condeescu cites him as the uncredited translator of Vincent Voiture's novel, Alcidales et Zelide, done at some point in the late 18th century. In or around 1799, he also probably completed a version of Eustathios Makrembolites and Godard de Beauchamps' Story of Hysmine and Hysminias. In parallel, Beldiman became identified as one of the earliest contributors to the popularization of Western theater. The beginnings of Moldavian own theatrical activity are dated to ca. 1800, when Conachi, Nicolae Dimachi and Dumitrache Beldiman produced a short series of puppet shows, with Romanian-language texts. They also wrote a comedy of their own, making Dumitrache's one of Moldavia's first playwrights. Another play, tentatively dated to 1811, was called Serdarul din Orhei ("The Serdar of Orhei"); historian Nicolae Iorga believes that it was penned by Alecu Beldiman.

Dumitrache and Alecu remained interested in both literature and politics; Filip withdrew to a monastery in 1792, while Iancu died later that same decade. According to philologist Gheorghe Bogdan-Duică, Alecu Beldiman's next translation was from Homer's Odyssey (as Odiseia lui Omir). Andreas Wolf, a Transylvanian Saxon physician, met the Beldimans ca. 1797, praising them as lovers of arts and literature. Bogdan-Duică hypothesizes that Beldiman handed his manuscript to Wolf, who took it to Hermannstadt and promised to publish it there. It shows the author's familiarity with, and reliance on, the French-style Romanization of Greek, but is above all infused with staples of the Moldavian dialect. Another similar text, tentatively attributed to Beldiman, showed up at Dorohoi, near Moldavia's border with Austrian Bukovina.

=== Literary fame ===
An unclear tradition claims that one of the Belidimans was involved in a project to unite Wallachia and Moldavia as a single "republic", with help from Napoleon Bonaparte. Following the Russian invasion of Moldavia in 1806, the youngest Beldiman brother interrupted his literary activities to serve in the occupation government. Alecu's own literary output became more notable following the Russo-Turkish War and the peace of Bucharest. Both Alecu Beldiman and Conachi had been chased out of their Bessarabian estates by the Russian occupation, which ultimately annexed the region as a Bessarabian Governorate; they settled in Iași as refugees. In 1815, Prince Scarlat Callimachi appointed Alecu an Aga of his citadel in Hârlău. At around that time, he also became involved in the thriving business of inn-keeping, establishing his own taproom in Bârlad. Beldiman was advanced to Postelnic in 1818, and finally became the Ispravnic of Iași in 1819, under Prince Michael Soutzos. An 1819 map by Giuseppe Bayardi shows that he owned a mansion on Iași's Sârbească Street. His estate grew to include parts of Popeni and Vinderei, in Tutova County, as well as several other townhouses in Iași. He also owned several hamlets populated by Romanies, which he kept as boyar slaves.

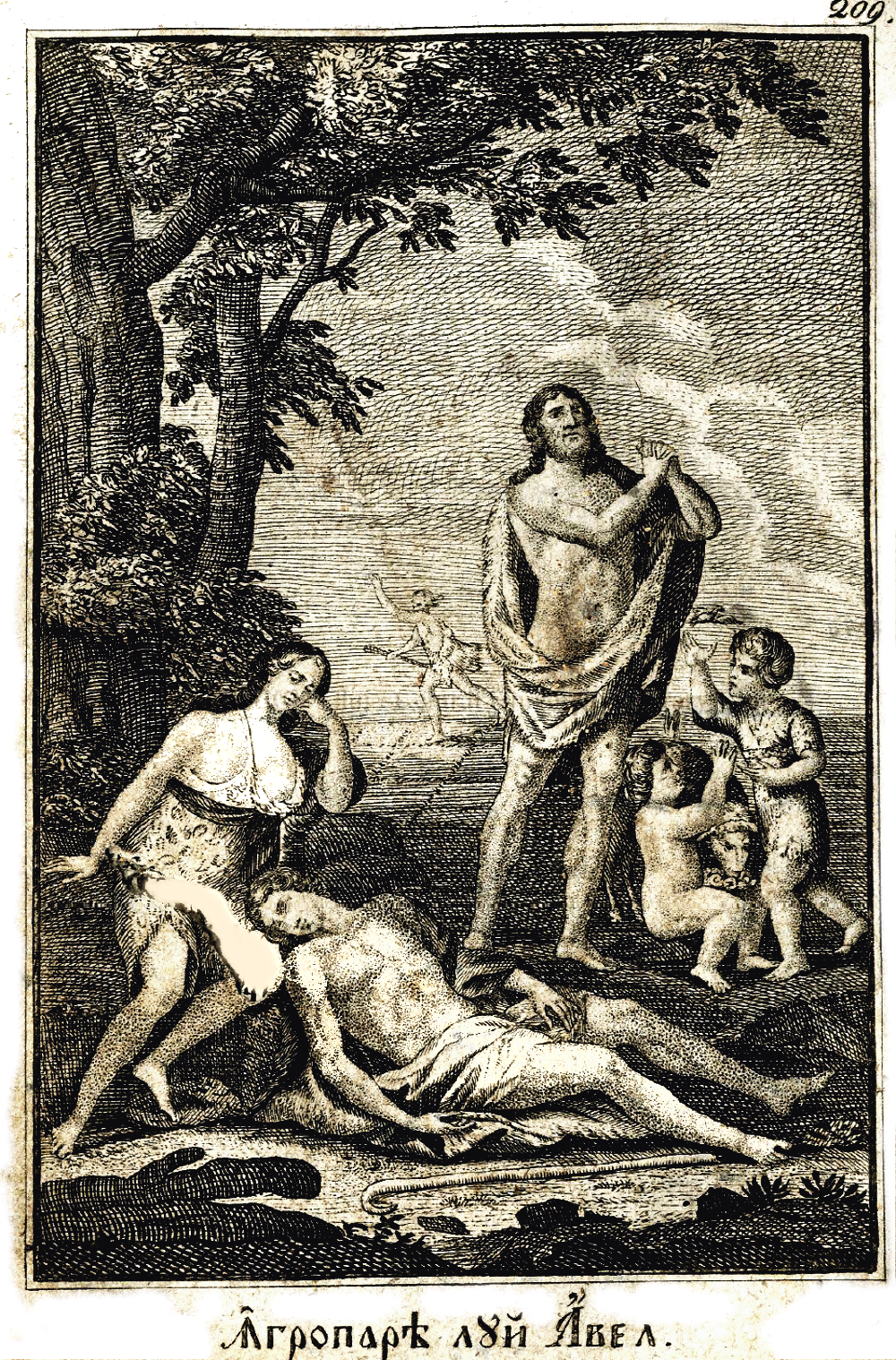
Abel's burial, as illustrated in the 1818 edition of Moartea lui Avel

At this new stage, Beldiman blended Romanian nationalism with an interest in modern education, declaring himself a direct contributor to the "material progress of the Romanian people". According to historian Neagu Djuvara, Beldiman closely resembles the Wallachian intellectuals of his era, specifically Naum Râmniceanu, Dionisie Eclesiarhul, and Zilot Românul, in being virulently anti-Greek and anti-Phanariote. Scholar Pompiliu Eliade sees the Beldimans and the Sturdzas as affiliates of the "National Party", which favored independence from the Ottomans and sought direct protection from the French Republic. However, Iorga also highlights the limits of Beldiman's nationalism: although he opted to stay in "Turkish Moldavia", he "never wrote as much as a verse, as much as a single line of prose" against Russian occupation in Bessarabia. Likewise, scholar Ovid Densusianu reads Beldiman as a Moldavian particularist, who was generally indifferent to the tribulations of Romanians in Wallachia and elsewhere.

Philologist Andreea Giorgiana Marcu notes that, as a translator of Western literature, Beldiman was necessarily a participant in the Age of Enlightenment. He resonated most with Neoclassicism, and especially with its "obviously moralizing" accounts. The Neoclassical trait of Beldiman's poems was also highlighted by literary historian Emil Manu; their "lucid moralism", Manu notes, makes him akin to La Rochefoucauld. Likewise, culture critic George Panu proposes that Beldiman and Conachi must have been closely familiarized with, and imitators of, Johan Gabriel Oxenstierna. Over 40 years, Beldiman arguably became the most prolific among Moldavia's contributors to Westernizing translations. As noted by Densusianu, Beldiman translated plays that were never intended for actual stage production, since there was no Moldavian theater to speak of. His texts had to introduce theatrical terminology for which there was yet no equivalent: he proposed obraz ("cheek" or "face") for "character", and schini for "scene". However, Eliade proposes that Beldiman was directly inspired to write for the stage by witnessing Moldavia's first-ever theatrical experiment, produced in December 1816 by Gheorghe Asachi.

By late 1817, Beldiman had completed his own version of Voltaire's Oreste, which was only published in 1820. He soon signed contracts with the Wallachian publisher, Zaharia Carcalechi, who was active in the literary circles of Habsburg Hungary. In 1818, Beldiman also put out Învățătură sau povățuire pentru facerea pâinii ("A Guide or Advisor to Bread-making"), ultimately based on a text by Christian Albert Rückert, but directly translated from the Greek version penned by Dimitrios Samurkasis (Dimitrie Samurcaș). Also that year, Beldiman completed a translation of Salomon Gessner's Der Tod Abels, from the French intermediary. It was published at Buda as Moartea lui Avel. Through his presence in the Habsburg realm, Beldiman was in contact with the "Transylvanian School", represented by poets such as Ion Budai-Deleanu. As a result, Iorga attributed to Budai-Deleanu a manuscript-poem called Menehmii sau frații de gemene, later discovered to have been Beldiman's translation of Jean-François Regnard's Les Ménechmes.

Beldiman followed up in 1820 with Istoria lui Numa Pompilie. This was a translation of Jean-Pierre Claris de Florian's Numa Pompilius, though Beldiman suppressed any mention of the real author. Its preface includes some of the earliest Romanian views on traductology: Beldiman complained about his struggles in adapting early modern Romanian to render complex phrases in French. As noted by linguist Gheorghe Ivănescu, Beldiman followed Iacob Stamati and other Moldavians in adopting a Wallachian spelling for some of his core vocabulary. Istoria consistently used giudecată (Romanian pronunciation: [dʒudekatə]; "trial" or "judgement") for the Moldavianized judecată ([ʒudekatə]).

Beldiman completed numerous other translations, without ever submitting them for print. Various scribes copied them by hand, and they enjoyed popularity in boyar circles. However, Beldiman discovered that the texts were being slowly altered in the process, and decided to create his own authorized copies. This process involved several younger scribes. One was Ioniță Sion, who took dictation from Beldiman in writing "all sorts of verse and stories"; he was not paid for the job, but was allowed to make and keep his own copies. By 1813, Matei Gane of Ciumulești had already collected and transcribed by hand Beldiman's various works. Beldiman penned, but never printed, other renditions of tragedies and stories by Antoine François Prévost (with Manon Lescaut), Madame Cottin, René-Charles Guilbert de Pixérécourt, Louis d'Ussieux, and various unknown authors. Reportedly, he also finished translated the Iliad, but this work, if it ever existed, remains lost.

=== Tragodiea Moldovei ===
The final stage of Beldiman's literary and political career was marked by the Greek War of Independence, part of which was fought on Moldavian soil. In early 1821, the country was invaded by Alexander Ypsilantis' Greek forces, comprising the Filiki Eteria and the Sacred Band. This occupation forced Beldiman out of Moldavia, and back into Bessarabia. The events, which culminated in an Ottoman incursion and a Greek defeat in the Battle of Dragashani, were narrated by Beldiman in his rhyming chronicle. It is most often called Tragodiea Moldovei ("Moldavia's Tragedy"), but is also known as Eterie sau jalnicele scene prilejuite în Moldova din resvrătirile grecilor, prin șeful lor Alexandru Ipsilanti venitu din Rusia la anul 1821 ("The Eteria or Awful Scenes Occurring in Moldavia Because of the Rebellions by Greeks under Their Leader Alexander Ypsilantis, Who Came in from Russia in 1821"). According to Călinescu, the work was unintentionally "buffoonish", reading like a "humorous rigmarole". The overall result ran at 4,260 lines of verse which, Călinescu argues, was of an "old-fashioned type" and "monotonous", similar to later works by Constantin Negruzzi.

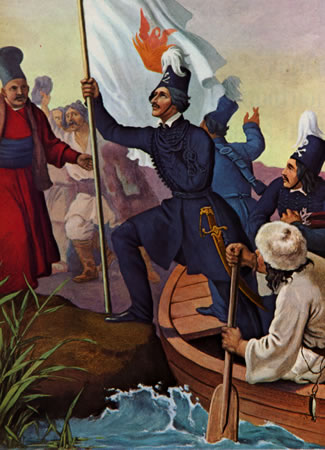
Alexander Ypsilantis crossing the Prut River into Moldavia; allegory by Peter von Hess

Scholar Gheorghe Cardaș views Beldiman as the final Moldavian representative of a "prolix, untalented" school of poets, which began in 1681 with the anonymous Chronological Poem of the Moldavian Rulers. Similarly, Densusianu notes that Beldiman demanded from his readers a patience that he never repaid. He was "not a poet, but only a versifier, and as such one in a string of mediocre writers." Moreover, his genre of choice, the "rhyming chronicle", was "unrewarding" and "manically" over-detailed, though he remained overall superior to Zilot, his Wallachian contemporary. According to Eliade, Tragodiea is a "long and tedious newspaper article, prosaic as no prose has ever been, amusing only because the author himself realizes that his work is so very difficult, and his ability so very limited." Eliade also finds that, being no longer disciplined by foreign grammar (as he was in his translations), Beldiman constructs incoherent phrases. His vocabulary is "flooded" with Greek, Ottoman, or Slavonic terms.

Panopol defends Beldiman's chronicle: "I for one find charm in his so-very-pedestrian lyrics, especially since, upon reading them, I find some historical clarity regarding that era of turmoil". According to historian Vlad Georgescu, Beldiman was still notable as the most erudite chronicler of his generation. As Călinescu writes, an "entertaining jolt" in the epic came wherever Beldiman described his contempt for various of his contemporaries: the "godless dog" Vasileios Karavias and the haughty but "so very cowardly" Stefan Bogoridi. Complex descriptions remain rare, as Beldiman often dismisses the Eterists and his other adversaries with just one epithet, sometimes bordering on the obscene. One line refers to a "Lividi Nicolaki, that base and ugly soul", who, according to Beldiman, had been appointed commander of Moldavia's Romanies by Ypsilantis' government. Researchers are unsure about whether this is a reference to Niccolò Livaditti, a Triestene painter who had been a member of the Carbonari.

Other aspects of the narrative were also polemical, reflecting Beldiman's brand of conservatism. In one episode of his epic, Beldiman sides with the local Turks, whom the Eterist invasion had decimated. Another one of his stanzas lambasts Tudor Vladimirescu, leader of the parallel uprising in Wallachia. As noted by Călinescu, Beldiman and Vladimirescu were both Romanian nationalists, but of different visions; the Moldavian poet described the Wallachian revolutionist as "deceitful", prone to demagoguery. Historian A. D. Xenopol also notes that Beldiman was sarcastic in his treatment of the Moldavian republican boyars, whom he called Decemviri.

The restoration of Ottoman rule was rendered complete by the Eterist defeat at Sculeni in June 1821. Beldiman, having been appointed Vornic, made the return trip to Iași. In November, he purchased the townhouse owned by a fellow boyar, the Wallachian Iordache Filipescu, in Păcurari neighborhood; it was here that he finished writing Tragodiea. His poem-chronicle purposefully refrained from documenting the entirety of Ioan Sturdza's reign, which began in 1822. One stanza circulates the notion that Sturdza was a "son of Moldavia", rather than a Phanariote, and expresses his belief that a "golden century" would follow. The Vornic soon returned to championing his version of boyar nationalism: in Tragodiea, he makes explicit references to the "national interest". From 1823, Beldiman preserved a copy of what he claimed to be Moldavia's Capitulation to the Ottomans, outlining the ancient rights of its inhabitants. The text expanded on earlier forgeries. Overall, he was more pro-Ottoman than Zilot and other chroniclers, being above all thankful that the Empire had defeated Ypsilantis.

=== Death and legacy ===
In reality, Beldiman was at odds with the new regime. As one of the more conservative boyars, he clashed with the monarch. In March 1824, with Dimachi and others, he authored a letter of protest against Prince Sturdza, which was addressed to his overlord, Sultan Mahmud II. During the same year, he was briefly imprisoned for his disobedience. Confined inside Tazlău Monastery, he produced his final set of poems, Stihuri ("Verse"). These are patriotic in tone, but noticeably skeptical of nationalism, explaining that, even though the Phanariotes had lost power, bad customs survived through native boyars; unusually in his context, he sided with the lower classes against the aristocrats. Several lines refer to the harsh conditions faced by travelers, noting that rainstorms had rendered infernal his trip to Tazlău. Stylistically, the Stihuri resemble both Neoclassicism and early Romantic poetry, introducing elements later found in works by Barbu Paris Mumuleanu.

Beldiman was ultimately released and made a discreet return to politics, living in relative seclusion for the rest of his life. His last published translation came out in 1824. It was a first volume of William Coxe's Travels into Poland, Russia, Sweden and Denmark, taken from a French version by Paul Henri Mallet. He died in January 1826, or at, earliest, December 1825—according to fellow writer Dimitrie Pastiescul, he still held a pen in his hand when this occurred. Buried at his family's favorite church of Talpalari, Beldiman left a large number of manuscripts, which were reportedly sold by the pound to a local collector. Both Dumitrache and Filip survived their brother's death, the former dying in 1831. Filip, better known under his monastic name "Filaret", was appointed Bishop of Roman and carateker of the Moldavian Metropolis. In 1842, he served as administrator of Moldavia, filling in for Prince Mihail Sturdza.

From his Romano marriage, Alecu had a daughter. Known as either Pulheria or Profira, she married into the Cantacuzino family. She was famous for raising her husband's illegitimate son, the half-Romani Dincă, who was formally her house slave. Her refusal to manumit him, and his subsequent suicide, resulted in mass support for abolitionism. Alecu's son, Vasile Beldiman, married a Mavrocordatos. His only notable public office was that of Caretaker (Epitrop) of Moldavian schools. His wife Elena Greceanu sold the Beldiman house in Păcurari to boyar Lupu Balș. It was demolished to make way for the Jockey Club Palace, itself demolished in 1966. Vasile died in 1853, and was survived by a son, Alexandru Beldiman, who was the head of Romanian Police and close friend of the United Principalities' first Domnitor, Alexandru Ioan Cuza. In this capacity, he failed to prevent Cuza's toppling by the "monstrous coalition" of February 1866, and came to oppose the regime of Carol I, founding the left-wing newspaper Adevărul. Cornești, still owned by this branch of the family, was passed to poet Dimitrie Anghel, and later to the Mavrocordatos.

Iordachi Beldiman, sometimes described as Alecu's son, was in fact one of his nephews, born to Dumitrache Beldiman. Iordachi married Catinca Dimachi, daughter of the writer. She was made famous by her affair with poet Alexandru Hrisoverghi; according to one account, Hrisoverghi died after jumping out a window in Iordachi's townhouse. Also a Vornic, Iordachi was noted for commissioning a gallery of portraits of Moldavian Princes. During the United Principalities era, he became a leading figure in Iași's conservative circles, helping Iacob Negruzzi establish the political review Constituțiunea. Alecu's niece, Maria or Marghioala, was a locally famous philanthropist, married to politician Scarlat Miclescu. Their son, Dimitrie S. Miclescu (1820–1896), participated in the 1848 revolutionary movement, as well as being a published poet. He became a noted agitator on the far-left of Romanian liberalism and renounced all claim to boyar privilege, including his family name.

Beldiman's translations continued to be read by young intellectuals in all Romanian-speaking areas: Constantin N. Brăiloiu, who went abroad to study in 1828, ordered copies of Oreste and Istoria lui Numa Pompilie, "so as not to forget his language". Ioniță Sion's manuscripts were preserved by his son, the poet-memoirist Gheorghe Sion. For decades, Tragodiea circulated in 23 handwritten copies, two of which were respectively owned by Nicolae Bălcescu and Alexandru Odobescu. In the 1840s, Mihail Kogălniceanu set himself the task of printing Beldiman's writings and documents as part of an anthology. In that generation, the lyrics served to inspire revolutionary poems, penned and published anonymously by Dimitrie Ralet. As Eterie sau jalnicele scene, Tragodiea was eventually printed in 1861, at the expense of an Alecu Balica; it was reissued in 1875 as Tragedia Moldovei.

By then, poet Vasile Alecsandri was actively campaigning for Beldiman to be included into the Romanian literary canon, while historian Bogdan Petriceicu Hasdeu was drawing attention to him as the founder of Romania's epic literature. In 1862, Beldiman's style was copied by Alexandru Pelimon, with his own versified account of the Vladimirescu revolt, published by C. A. Rosetti. In that context, philologist Alexandru Lambrior unsuccessfully proposed to set the Romanian literary standard exclusively on words used by Beldiman and Conachi. Beldiman's work was finally rediscovered in the 1890s. One of its promoters was the antiquarian George Ionescu-Gion, who insisted that Beldiman was without philosophical merit, but a genuine patriot. The same belief was expressed in 1910 by Xenopol, according to whom Beldiman was not significant as a poet, but voiced the "national sentiment in all its freedom". An unpublished set of Beldiman's poems, alongside similar samples by other Moldavians of his era, were collected for print by Paul Cornea and other literary scholars, and issued at Editura Minerva in 1982. Other texts included a Beldiman acrostic, kept in the original manuscript by poet Emil Gârleanu, and then by the Romanian Academy Library, but still not published in 1987.
