= List of churches established by Stephen the Great =

Stephen the Great, Prince of Moldavia, established a number of Romanian Orthodox churches and monasteries as ktitor. The tradition that he built one after every battle he won is untrue, but he did build certain ones in honor of victories and in memory of his fallen soldiers. Based on the carved inscriptions placed contemporaneously to his reign, Stephen built the following churches, plus an additional two that were added later based on local tradition, without indicating the date of construction. He almost certainly established additional churches (at least seven others are attributed to him), but these are the ones for which there is clear documentation.

Church	Location	Year built	Photo
Dormition of the Theotokos Church, Putna Monastery	Putna	1466-1469	
St. Procopius	Milișăuți	1487 (destroyed 1917)	
St. Nicholas	Kiliya, Ukraine	1482	
Holy Cross	Pătrăuți	1487	
St. Elias	Sfântu Ilie	1488	
St. George Church, Voroneț Monastery	Gura Humorului	1488	
Beheading of St. John the Baptist	Vaslui	1490	
St. Nicholas	Iași	1491-1492	
St. George	Hârlău	1492	
Dormition of the Theotokos	Borzești	1493-1494	
Ss. Peter and Paul Cathedral	Huși	1495	
St. Nicholas	Dorohoi	1495	
St. Nicholas Church, Popăuți Monastery	Botoșani	1496	
Holy Archangel Michael Church, Războieni Monastery	Războieni	1496	
Nativity of the Theotokos Church, Tazlău Monastery	Tazlău	1496-1497	
Ascension of the Lord Church, Neamț Monastery	Vânători-Neamț	1497	
Nativity of St. John the Baptist	Piatra Neamț	1497-1498	
St. John the New chapel and bell tower, Bistrița Monastery	Bistrița, Neamț	1498	
St. John (bell tower)	Piatra Neamț	1499	
Elevation of the Holy Cross	Volovăț	1500-1502	
Descent of the Holy Spirit Church, Dobrovăț Monastery	Dobrovăț	1503-1504	
Beheading of St. John the Baptist	Reuseni	1503-1504	
St. Parascheva	Râmnicu Sărat	1704 (inscription)	
Holy Archangels Michael and Gabriel	Scânteia	1846 (inscription)	
