= Petrino =

Petrino may refer to:

== People ==
- Petrino (surname)

== Places ==
- Petrino, Targovishte Province, village in Targovishte Province, Bulgaria
- Petrino, Resen, North Macedonia
- Petrino, Vologda Oblast, Russia
