= Epaminonda Bucevschi =

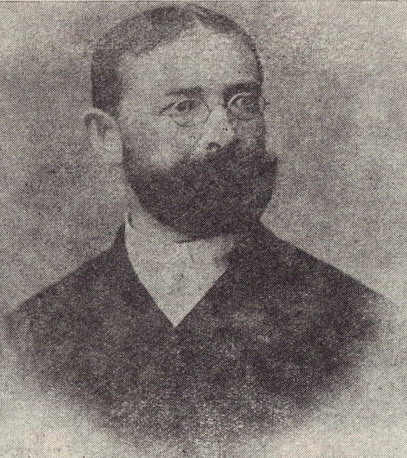

Epaminonda Bucevschi (March 3, 1843 – February 13, 1891) was an ethnic Romanian painter from the Duchy of Bukovina in Austria-Hungary.

Born in Iacobeni, north of Vatra Dornei, he studied at the theological seminary in Cernăuți from 1863 to 1867; this included a drawing component. He went on to the Academy of Fine Arts Vienna from 1868 to 1874; in 1872–1873, he was taught by Anselm Feuerbach and Joseph von Führich. He won first prize as the best student in 1872, and joined the Albrecht Dürer Society in 1873. He took study trips to Germany, France and Italy. He became a fashionable artist in Vienna, leading him to open a studio where he worked on icons, compositions, rococo pieces, majolica and portraits. He was friends with Viennese students Mihai Eminescu, Ciprian Porumbescu and Teodor V. Ștefanelli, who visited him often. Porumbescu found in him a source of material and moral support in his moments of struggle.

Upon the request of Silvestru Morariu-Andrievici, he accepted the position of diocesan painter. In 1871, he designed the exterior decor at Putna Monastery ahead of the congress of Romanian students. He initiated a new iconographic approach toward church painting in Bukovina. He assembled historical and mythical compositions, executing realist portraits. He painted and restored tens of churches. The Serbian Orthodox Cathedral in Zagreb remains a high point. He also worked on the Residence of Bukovinian and Dalmatian Metropolitans in Cernăuți. By studying iconography in the Gospel Book from Humor Monastery and in the churches he founded, he was able to make an informed conjecture about the appearance of Stephen the Great. He awakened an interest for fine arts in Bukovina. His work hangs at the museums in Suceava and Câmpulung Moldovenesc. He died in Cernăuți.
