= Petrino (surname) =

Petrino is a surname derived from the masculine given name Peter with the added diminutive suffix -ino. Notable people with the name include:

- Alexander von Petrino (1824–1899), Romanian nobleman and politician
- Bob Petrino Sr. (1937–2018), American football player and coach
- Bobby Petrino (born 1961), American football player and coach
- Dimitrie Petrino (1838–1878), Romanian poet
- Nick Petrino, American football player and coach
- Paul Petrino (born 1967), American football player and coach
- Vitor Petrino (born 1997), Brazilian mixed martial artist

== See also ==
- Petrino (disambiguation)
