= Tazlăul Mare oil field =

Oil field in Neamț County, Romania

Tazlăul Mare
- Country: Romania
- Region: Neamț County
- Offshore/onshore: onshore
- Operator: Europa Oil & Gas

Field history
- Discovery: 2010
- Start of development: 2014
- Start of production: 2015

Production
- Current production of oil: 5,000 barrels per day (~2.5×10^{5} t/a)
- Estimated oil in place: 30.6 million tonnes (~ 35.8×10^{6} m^{3} or 225 million bbl)
- Estimated gas in place: 8.5×10^{9} m^{3} 300×10^{9} cu ft

The Tazlăul Mare oil field is an oil field located in Tazlău, Neamț County. It was discovered in 2010 and developed by Europa Oil & Gas. The pre-drill Oil in place reserves of the Tazlăul Mare oil field are estimated to be 225 million barrels (30.6 million tonnes), and production will be centered on 5,000 barrels per day (790 m^{3}/d).
