= I. I. Mironescu =

Romanian prose writer and physician

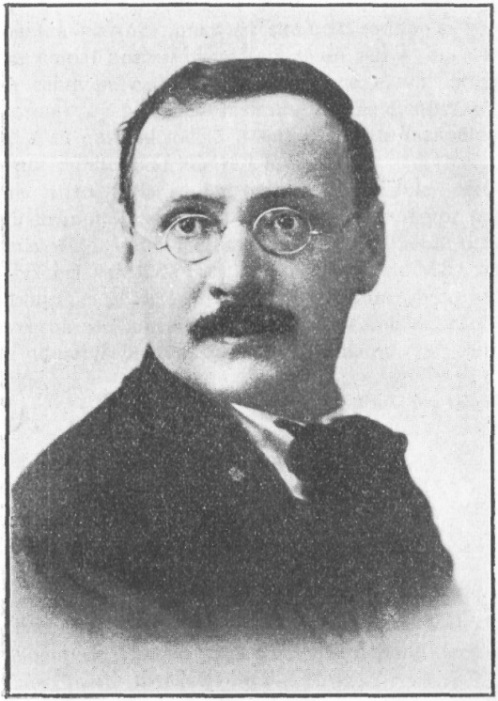
I. I. Mironescu

Ioan I. Mironescu (pen name of Eugen I. Mironescu; June 13, 1883 – July 22, 1939) was a Romanian prose writer and physician. A native of the Moldavia region, he headed a dermatology clinic and taught medicine at Iași, while also publishing several volumes of short humorous tales.

== Biography ==
Born in Tazlău, Neamț County to the teacher Ioan Mironescu and his wife Sofia (née Honcu), he attended primary school in his native village from 1889 to 1894. In Iași, where his schooling was often interrupted due to his frequent illnesses, he attended the National College in 1894, followed by the Boarding High School in 1896 and from 1900 to 1904. In the latter school, where he studied at the classical section, one of his teachers was Garabet Ibrăileanu. In the summer of 1904, he worked as a medical orderly in the Bacău area, and was then enlisted into an infantry regiment based at Piatra Neamț.

From 1905 to 1911, he attended the medical faculty of Iași University; following graduation, he went to the University of Berlin, where he audited courses in medicine and surgery. Back in Iași, he obtained a doctorate in 1912, the topic being leukocytosis in syphilis and its treatment. Beginning in 1912, he worked as a physician at Iași, Roznov, Chișinău and Slănic-Moldova, and also authored medical texts.

In the Second Balkan War, despite his medical training, he served as an ordinary soldier, but once hostilities were over, spent several months as head of a floating clinic meant to fight cholera in the Zimnicea-Caracal area. He then returned to Iași, went to Berlin for further studies, but hurried back as Germany entered World War I. From 1914 to 1916, he held a position at a therapeutic laboratory. While Romania was in the war from 1916 to 1918, he worked at an infectious disease hospital as a combat medic, himself contracting influenza and a recurring fever that left him with a weakened heart. Among his awards were the Military Virtue Medal and a knighthood in the Order of the Crown. A specialist in dermatology, he became a professor at the Iași medical faculty's pharmacology department in 1921, but in 1923 was transferred to serve as dermatology clinic director and professor, remaining until his death. He belonged to a number of scientific organizations. Mironescu also sat in the Assembly of Deputies. He died in his native village at the age of fifty-six.

Mironescu made his literary debut in 1906, publishing the sketch La cumătrie in Viața Românească, of which he was a founding member and recurring contributor. His writings also appeared in Însemnări ieșene and Însemnări literare. His published volumes (Sandu Hurmuzel, 1916; Oameni și vremuri, 1920; Într-un "colț de rai", 1930; Catiheții de la Humulești, 1938) include several sketches marked by an authentic folk humor. This bears echoes of Mironescu's talent as a teller of tales, largely in oral fashion, as recalled by contemporaries.

== Bibliography ==
- Sandu Hurmuzel (short stories), Bucharest, 1916
- Oameni și vremuri (tales), Iași, 1920
- Într-un "colț de rai" (tales), Bucharest, 1930
- Catiheții de la Humulești, Iași, 1938
- Tulie Radu Teacă, Bucharest, 1940 (revised edition, 1944)
- Scrieri alese, Bucharest, 1953
- Oameni și vremuri (anthology), Bucharest, 1959
- Furtună veteranul, Bucharest, 1961
- Scrieri, Bucharest, 1968
- Tulie Radu Teacă, Iași, 1987
