= Talpalari Church =

Heritage site in Iași County, Romania

Coordinates: 47°09′56″N 27°34′42″E

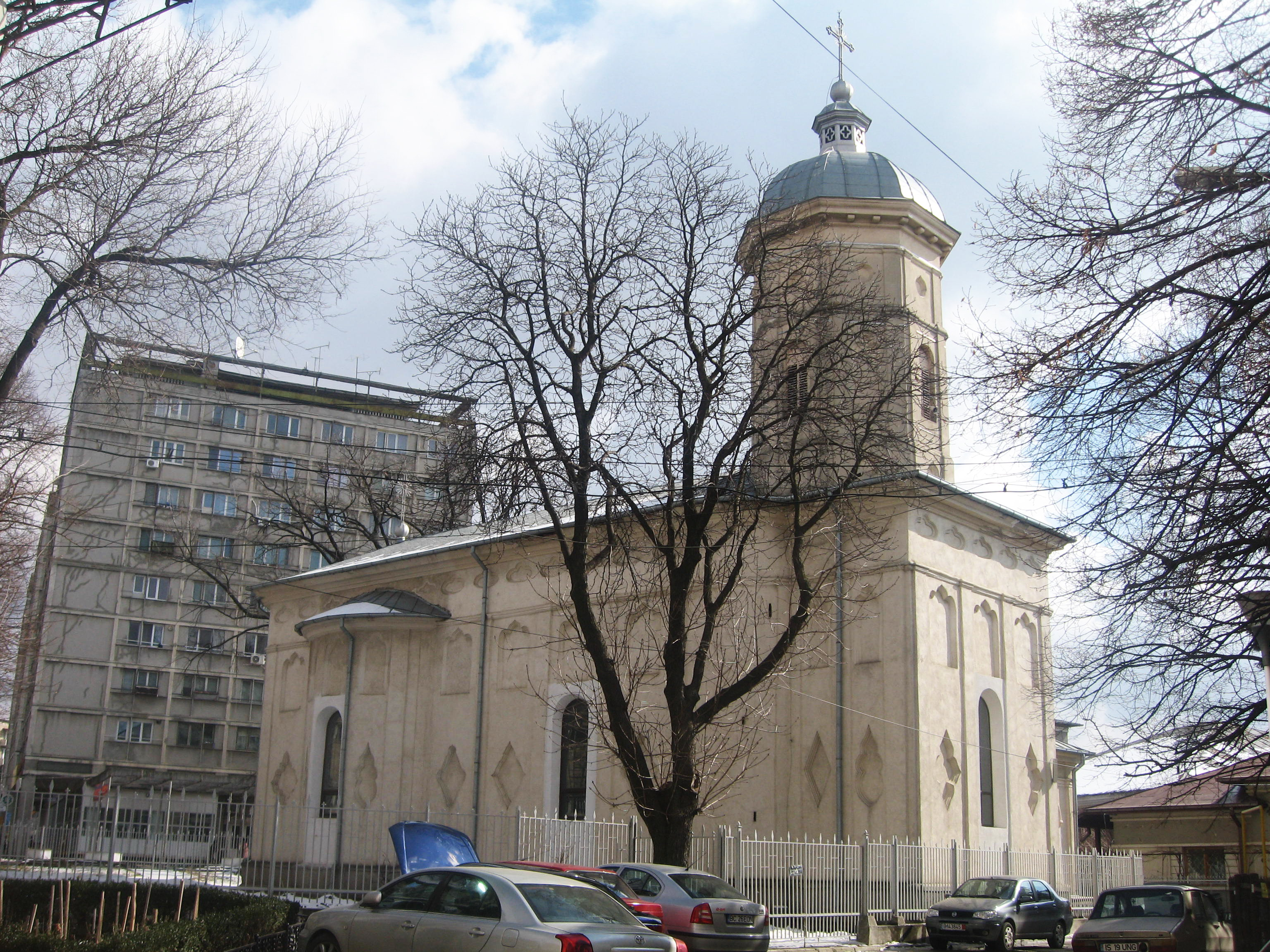
Talpalari Church

The Talpalari Church (Romanian: Biserica Talpalari) is a Romanian Orthodox church located at 3 Tălpălari Street in Iași, Romania. It is dedicated to the Nativity of Mary and to Elijah.

The first church on the site was built around 1640. The ktitor was vistiernic (treasurer) Iordache Cantacuzino, brother-in-law and close adviser to voivode Vasile Lupu. It was located on the city's northern edge and dedicated to the Nativity of Mary. The walls remained, but the church was rebuilt around 1760, and was covered with pine boards in 1797. In the 18th century, shoe-sole makers (tălpălari) settled in the area, giving rise to the church's popular name. Their guild maintained a candle in the church until the late 19th century; from early on, the church and its parishioners benefited from certain privileges and donations from the princes. Aside from the Cantacuzino family, which offered support to the church for 220 years, other prominent families were benefactors: Beldiman, Scorțescu, Cazimir, Hermeziu, Burghelea, Gane, Carp, Botezatu, Bosiasa. In 1828, the ban Atanasie Gosan willed the entire Mădârjești estate to the church, as well as land in Bucium (now a neighborhood of Iași), together with houses and orchards.

In July 1827, a devastating fire completely destroyed the church. A descendant of the original founders, vornic Dimitrie Cantacuzino-Pașcanu, rebuilt the structure. He and his wife Pulcheria are depicted in an oil painting, holding the church. During the period, Metropolitan Veniamin Costache, himself related to the Cantacuzenes, was preoccupied by the church's well-being. By 1835, reconstruction was complete, and a liturgy was celebrated in the new building for the opening of the nearby Academia Mihăileană. Subsequently, the church would serve as a chapel for the school. The church was practically ruined by 1884, when renovations took place, lasting until 1890. The walls were repaired, the walls and ceilings painted in oil, the iconostasis gilt, the balcony, doors and windows redone. The bell tower was also rebuilt, and two pavilions added to the south side of the church: one at the entrance, the other near the altar, above the crypt which contains the graves of benefactors.

The church is cross-shaped; the altar has a window on the eastern axis, while the nave had a semi-spherical cupola supported by four semicircular arches. The neo-Renaissance painting, done in 1886, has several large canvases, including two scenes near the entrance: Calvary and Christ Judged by Pilate. The wooden iconostasis is carved in a Baroque style; it has white columns with sculptures of gilt wood. Icons are arranged in the classical style. The exterior walls are decorated in a Constantinople Baroque on three registers of different dimensions.

Under the communist regime, the church's assets were seized. It was placed in danger by massive new construction, nearly sharing the fate of Academia Mihăileană, which was demolished in 1964. In 1953, a second dedication, to the prophet Elijah, was added. This was due to the fact that a filial church by that name, built in 1620, was demolished to make way for apartment blocks. After the Romanian Revolution, some repair work took place, including to the crypt, above which a Byzantine-style mosaic of the Resurrection was placed.

The church is listed as a historic monument by Romania's Ministry of Culture and Religious Affairs.

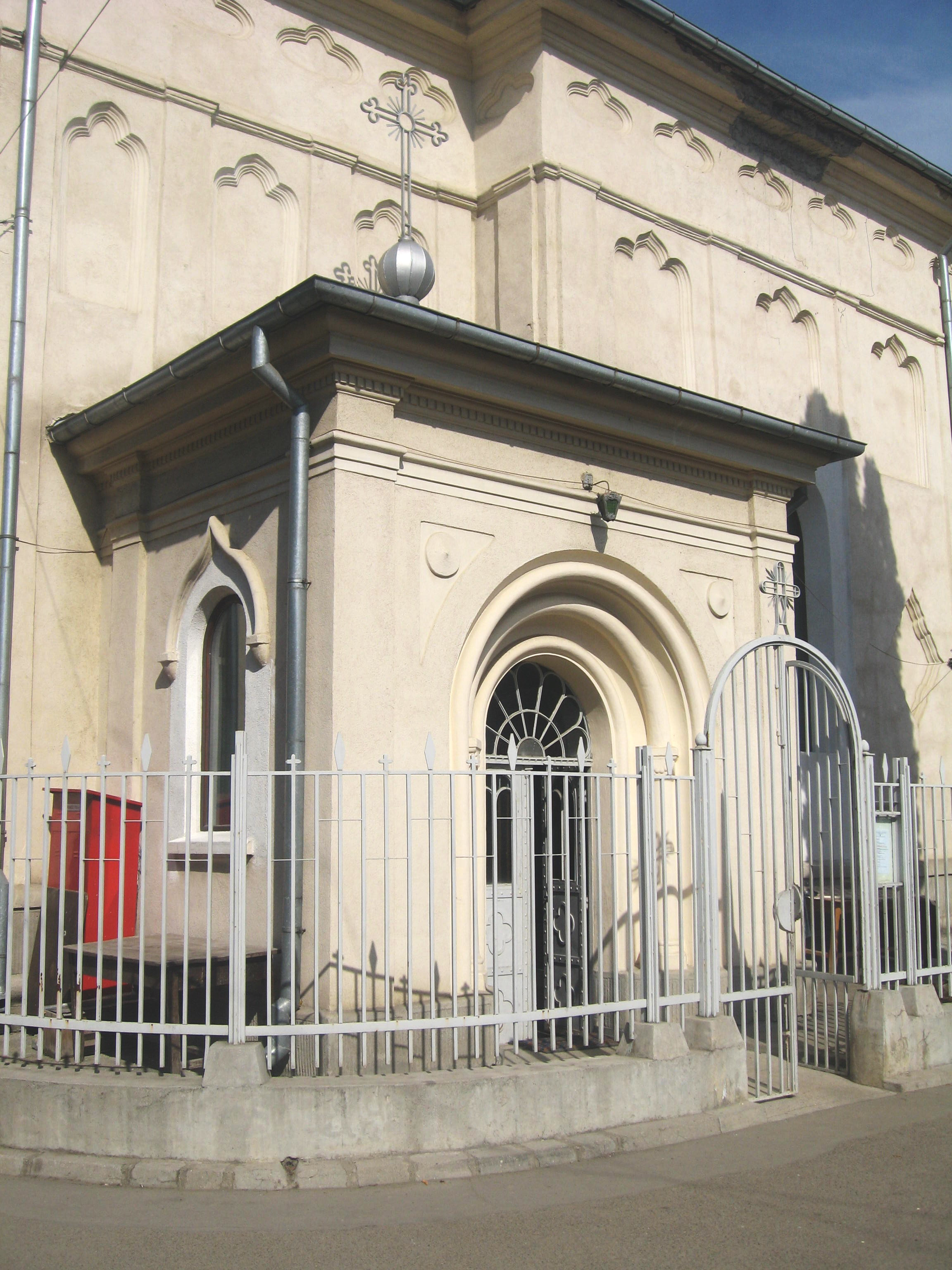
Entrance

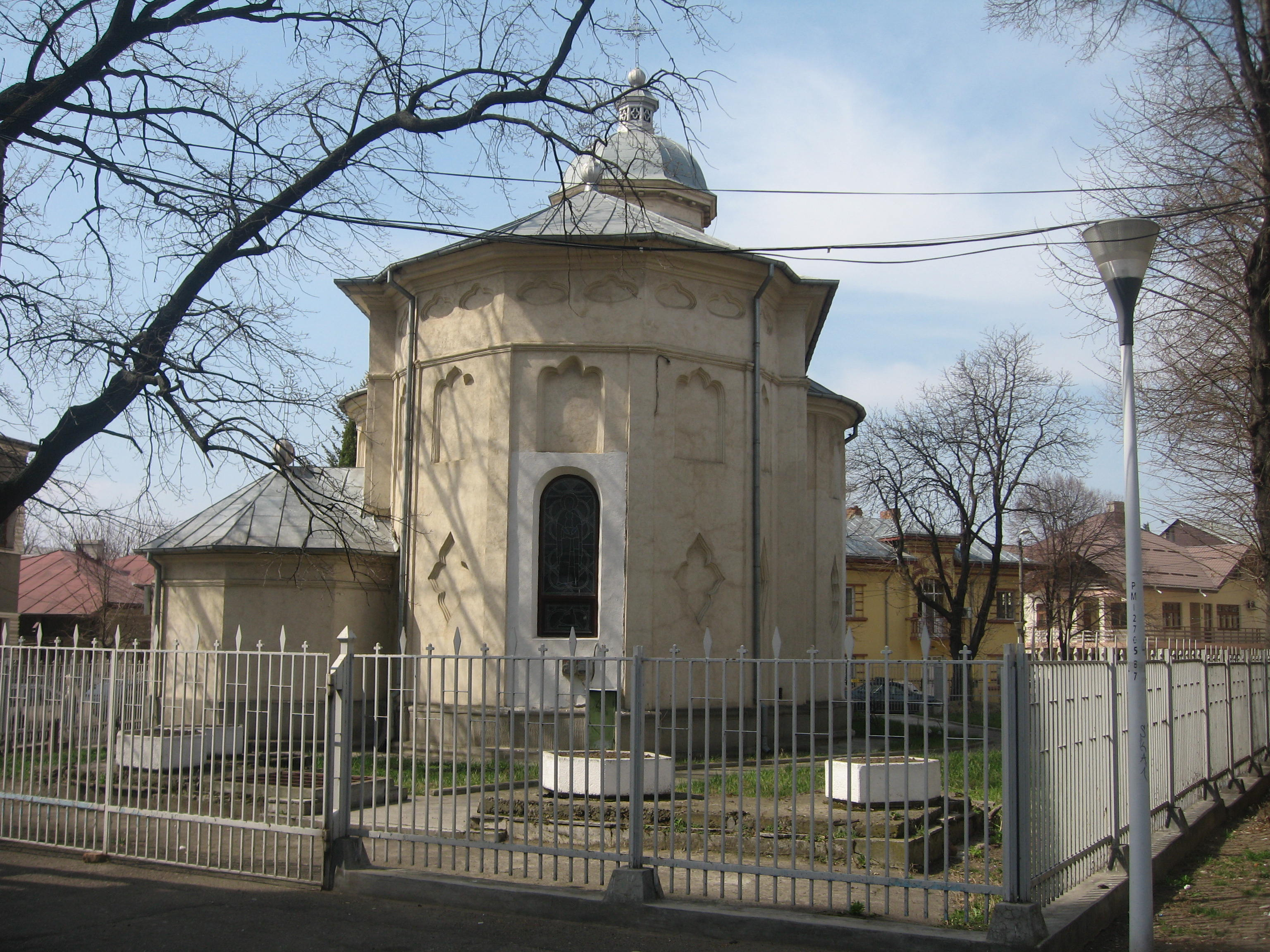
Apse

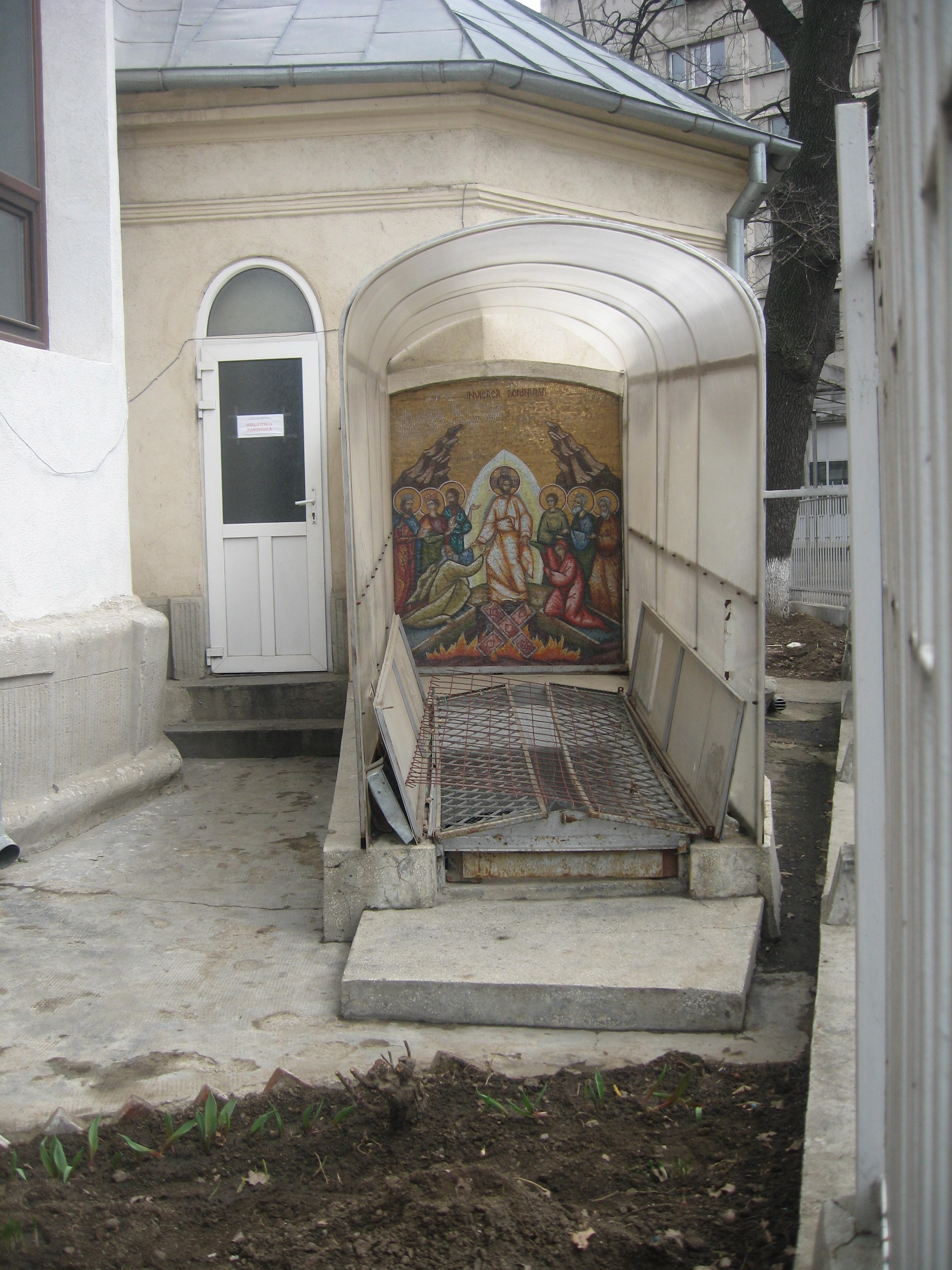
Crypt entrance

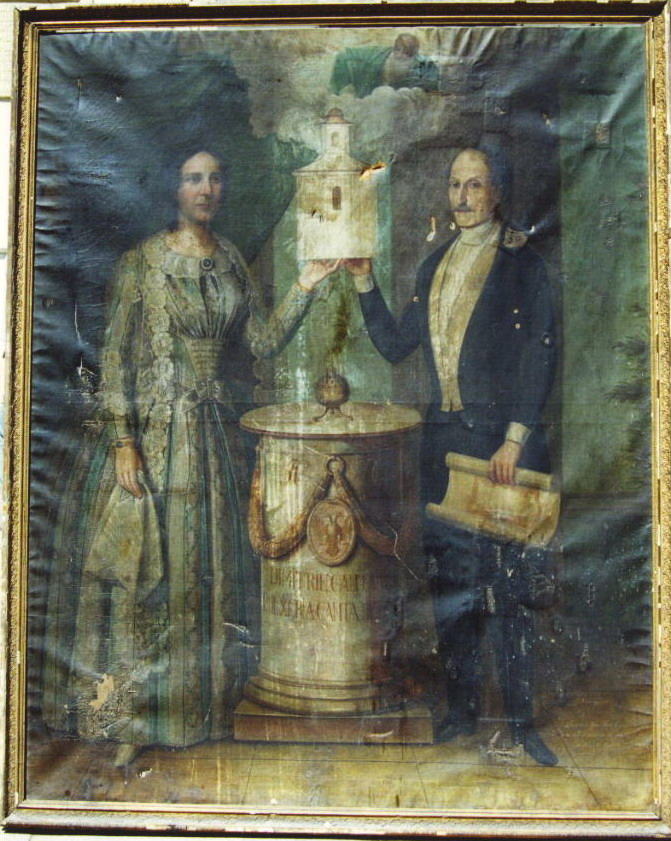
Painting of ktitors Dimitrie Cantacuzino-Pașcanu and his wife, Pulcheria
