= List of ambassadors of Italy to Romania =

Ambassador of Italy to Romania
- Ambasciatore d'Italia al Romania
- Incumbent; Alfredo Maria Durante Mangoni since July 16, 2021
- Style: His Excellency
- Inaugural holder: Annibale Strambio
- Formation: March 20, 1859
- Website: http://www.ambbucarest.esteri.it/ambasciata_bucarest/it/ambasciata/

Ambassadors of Italy have been sent to Romania from as early as October 27, 1878, when the Romanian Principality gained its independence from the Ottoman Empire (as a result of the Russo-Turkish War of 1877–1878).

Annibale Strambio was appointed Consul and Agent of the Kingdom of Sardinia in Bucharest soon after the emergence of the United Principalities through the 1859 union between Moldavia and Wallachia (at a time when, in the aftermath of the Crimean War, Sardinia was one of the European powers overseeing the new state). Between the two dates, Sardinia ensured Italian unification, with Strambio being the first to represent the new Italian state.

== Consuls and Agents (1859-1878) ==
Name	Date of appointment
Annibale Strambio	March 20, 1859
Francesco Teccio di Bayo	October 23, 1865
Romano Suzinno	February 22, 1867
Saverio Fava	September 27, 1868

== Ministers Plenipotentiary (1878-1945) ==
Name	Date of appointment
Saverio Fava	October 27, 1878
Giuseppe Tornielli Brusati di Vergano	December 5, 1879
Francesco Curtopassi	January 2, 1888
Emanuele Beccaria Incisa	February 3, 1895
Carlo Fasciotti	June 18, 1911
Alberto Martin Franklin	August 1, 1919
Pompeo Aloisi	March 1, 1923
Carlo Durazzo	October 1, 1925
Gabriele Preziosi	March 8, 1928
Ugo Sola	October 27, 1932
Pellegrino Ghigi	December 23, 1938
Renato Bova Scoppa	July 11, 1941

== Chargés d'Affaires (1945-1947) ==
Name	Date of appointment
Pietro Gerbore	March 13, 1945
Manlio Castronuovo	February 20, 1947

== Ministers Plenipotentiary (1947-1964) ==
Name	Date of appointment
Michele Scammacca del Murgo e di Agnone	October 17, 1947
Alberto Calisse	March 14, 1951
Francesco Lo Faro	May 22, 1955
Alberto Paveri Fontana di Fontana Pradosa	October 23, 1959

== Ambassadors (1964-) ==
Name	Date of appointment	observations
Alberto Paveri Fontana di Fontana Pradosa	July 15, 1964	
Niccolò Moscato	November 5, 1964	
Antonino Restivo	September 30, 1972	
Ernesto Quintino Bolasco	March 24, 1975	
Benedetto Santarelli	August 10, 1981	
Sergio Cattani	September 23, 1985	
Luigi Amaduzzi	November 12, 1988	
Bernardo Uguccioni	July 15, 1991	
Giuseppe de Michelis di Slonghello	January 16, 1995	
Anna Blefari Melazzi	April 30, 1998	
Stefano Ronca	May 12, 2003	
Daniele Mancini	November 7, 2005	
Mario Cospito	August 2008	January 2013
Diego Brasioli	February 2013	(*He was born in Rome in 1961): In 1985 he graduated from the Sapienza University of Rome.; In 1986 he entered the diplomatic service.; From 1988 to 1995 he was employed at the Italian Embassies in Pakistan and in Jordan.; He returned to Rome and served in the Middle East and Mediterranean Office of the General Directorate for Political Affairs of the Farnesina.; From 1999 to 2007 he was sent to Lebanon, at the Embassy of Italy in Beirut, and he was Consul General in Los Angeles.; From 2007 to 2010 he was the head of the Foreign Ministry Office responsible for the G8 political agenda, anti-terrorism and the fight against organized crime.; From 2010 to 2012 he was President of the Interministerial Committee for Human rights.
Marco Giungi	May 11, 2017	born October 4, 1962 in Ancona)
Alfredo Maria Durante Mangoni	July 16, 2021	
