= Petrino, Vologda Oblast =

Petrino Петрино
- Village
- Location within Vologda Oblast Location within Russia
- Coordinates: 59°25′N 37°54′E
- Country: Russia
- Region: Vologda Oblast
- District: Cherepovetsky District
- Time zone: UTC+3:00

Petrino (Russian: Петрино) is a rural locality (a village) in Voskresenskoye Rural Settlement, Cherepovetsky District, Vologda Oblast, Russia. The population was 86 as of 2002. There are 2 streets.

== Geography ==
Petrino is located 39 km (24 mi) north of Cherepovets (the district's administrative centre) by road. Voskresenskoye is the nearest rural locality.
