= Zaharia Carcalechi =

Austrian Aromanian Romanian-language publisher (1784/7–1856)

Bulgarian-language book published by Carcalechi in Bucharest in 1844

Zaharia Carcalechi (1784 or 1787—1856) was an Imperial Austrian-born Aromanian publisher in the Romanian language.

Born into an Aromanian family in Oradea, his father, a merchant, later moved the family to Brașov. Zaharia, after settling in the Hungarian capital Buda, worked as a typographer and helped popularize books in Romanian. Opening a bookstore, he edited books in Romanian with the help of the university press; these were written by authors from Transylvania as well as from the Danubian Principalities. He edited a collection of theological and philosophical teachings as well as travel notes by Dinicu Golescu. In 1821, the oldest Romanian-language literary magazine, Biblioteca românească ("The Romanian Library"), appeared under his name in Buda. This publication, which he sought to shape into an encyclopedia, included history, literature, cultural advertising, popular science, sundry information, practical advice and miscellanea. It circulated in Transylvania and in the Principalities. He benefited from the assistance of Emanuil Gojdu, a patron of Romanian publishing houses in Buda. After the initial edition, further issues appeared in 1829-1830 and 1834. As part of a shift among Romanian publishers from Buda to Bucharest, he renounced his post at the Buda university in 1837, setting up in the capital of Wallachia.
