= Barbu Paris Mumuleanu =

Barbu Paris Mumuleanu (1794 – May 21, 1836) was a Wallachian poet.

Born in Slatina, his father was originally from a village and sold trinkets. Initially employed as a logothete to the vistier (treasurer), he later moved to Bucharest. Spending several years there, he worked in the home of kaymakam Constantin Filipescu, who was a connoisseur of European poetry. This is the origin of Mumuleanu's familiarity with the verses of Alphonse de Lamartine, Victor Hugo and Lord Byron. His reading material included Anacreon, Athanasios Christopoulos, the Bible, Ioan Barac, the Văcărescu family poets, Costache Conachi, Hesiod, Homer and Ovid. He knew Greek and probably some French.

Mumuleanu made his published debut with Rost de poezii adecă stihuri, an 1820 book of poetry. Two others followed in 1825: Caracteruri and Plângerea și tânguirea Valahiei asupra nemulțemirii streinilor ce au derăpănat-o. These were accompanied by prefaces that advocated a national culture. Aesthetically, his works combine classical forms with Romantic inspiration. Most of his poems are erotic and bacchic in the style of Anacreon; two exceptions are an ode for the opening of Gheorghe Lazăr's school and a vaguely Voltairean ode to mankind. He was married and had at least three children; at the time of his death, Mumuleanu lived in Bucharest's Batiște district.
