= Tazlău =

- Commune
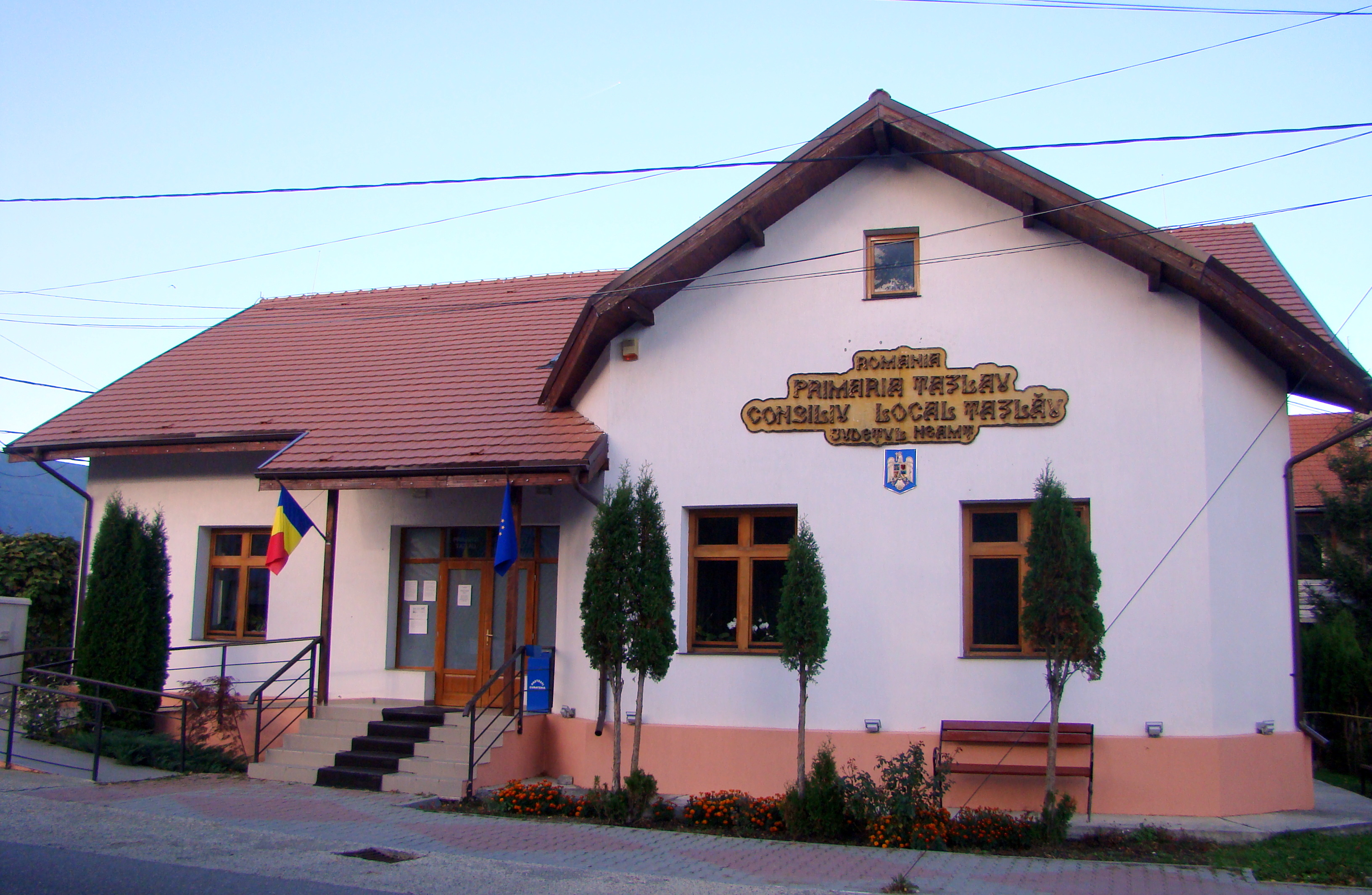
- Tazlău town hall

- Location in Neamț County

- Location in Romania
- Coordinates: 46°43′N 26°28′E
- Country: Romania
- County: Neamț

Government
  - Mayor (2020–2024): Ion Nechita (USR)
- Area: 177.56 km^{2} (68.56 sq mi)
- Elevation: 427 m (1,401 ft)
- Population (2021-12-01): 2,381
  - Density: 13.41/km^{2} (34.73/sq mi)
- Time zone: UTC+02:00 (EET)
  - Summer (DST): UTC+03:00 (EEST)
- Postal code: 617460
- Area code: +(40) 233
- Vehicle reg.: NT
- Website: tazlau.ro

Tazlău is a commune in Neamț County, Western Moldavia, Romania. It is composed of a single village, also named Tazlău.

Tazlău Monastery is located in the village.

== Geography ==
The commune is situated at the western edge of the Moldavian Plateau, in the foothills of the Tarcău Mountains. It lies at an altitude of 427 m (1,401 ft), on the banks of the river Tazlău.

Tazlău is located in the southern part of Neamț County, 32 km (20 mi) from the county seat, Piatra Neamț, on the border with Bacău County. It neighbors the following communes: Borlești to the north, Balcani to the south, Tarcău and Zemeș to the west, Rediu and Cândești to the east.

The Tazlăul Mare oil field is located on the territory of the commune.

Historical population
Year	Pop.	±%
1992	3,163	—
2002	3,013	−4.7%
2011	2,224	−26.2%
2021	2,381	+7.1%
Source: Census data

== Natives ==
- I. I. Mironescu (1883–1939), prose writer and physician
