= Beheading of St. John the Baptist Church, Vaslui =

Heritage site in Vaslui County, Romania

Coordinates: 46°38′01″N 27°43′53″E

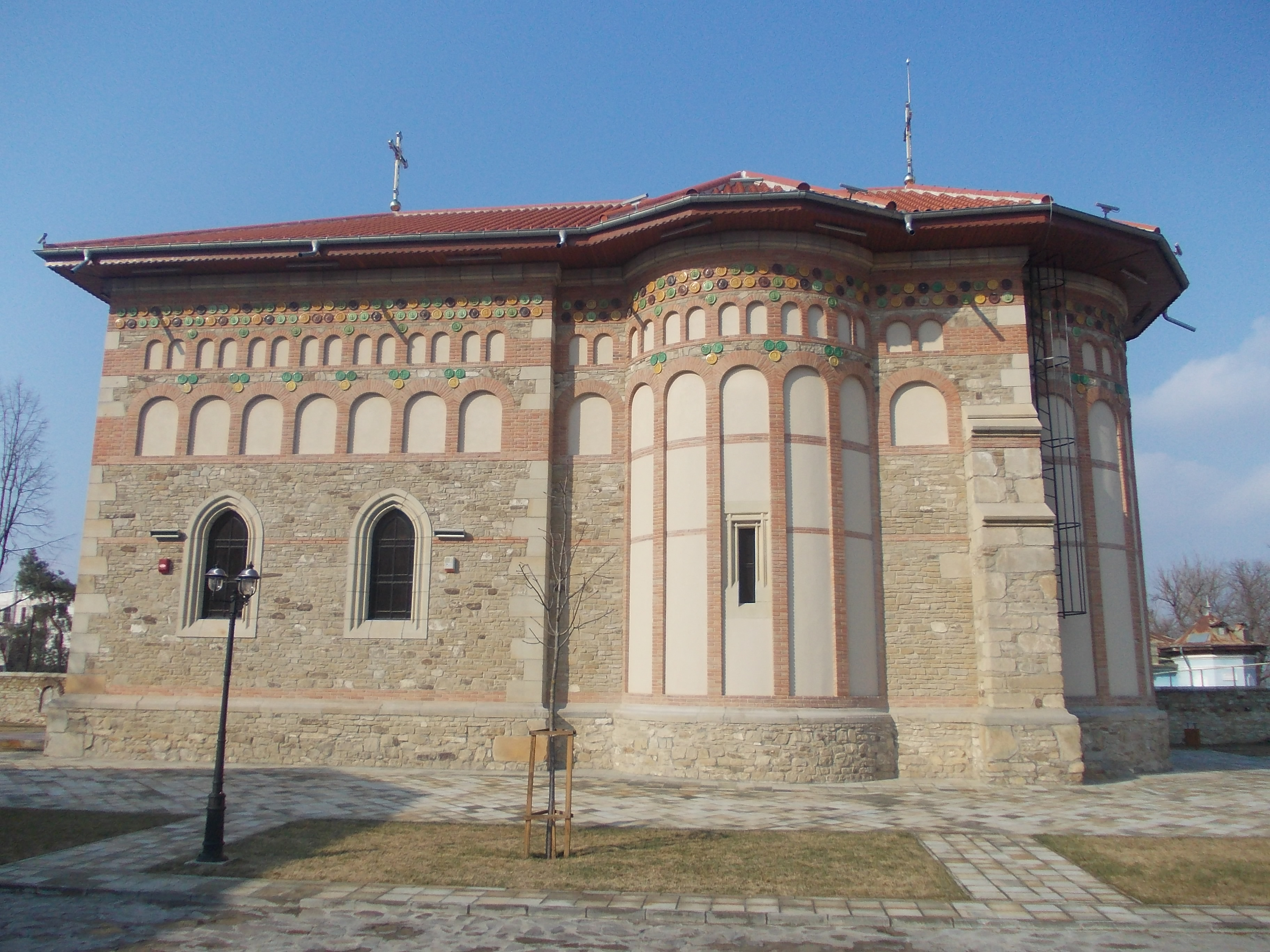
Beheading of St. John the Baptist Church

The Beheading of St. John the Baptist Church (Romanian: Biserica Tăierea Capului Sfântului Ioan Botezătorul) is a Romanian Orthodox church located at 58 Ștefan cel Mare Street, Vaslui, Romania. It is dedicated to the Beheading of John the Baptist.

The church was originally founded in 1490 by Stephen III of Moldavia, as a dependency of his princely court. It deteriorated over time and collapsed in 1818. In 1820, it was rebuilt by Maria Cantacuzino, the wife of high logothete Costachi Ghica, who owned Vaslui in the early 19th century. The present appearance results from the restoration work carried out in 1914–1928.

The architectural style is that prevalent in Moldavia under Stephen. Representative elements include the large vestibule and the colorfully decorated facades. It is the earliest in a series of distinct town churches built by Stephen.

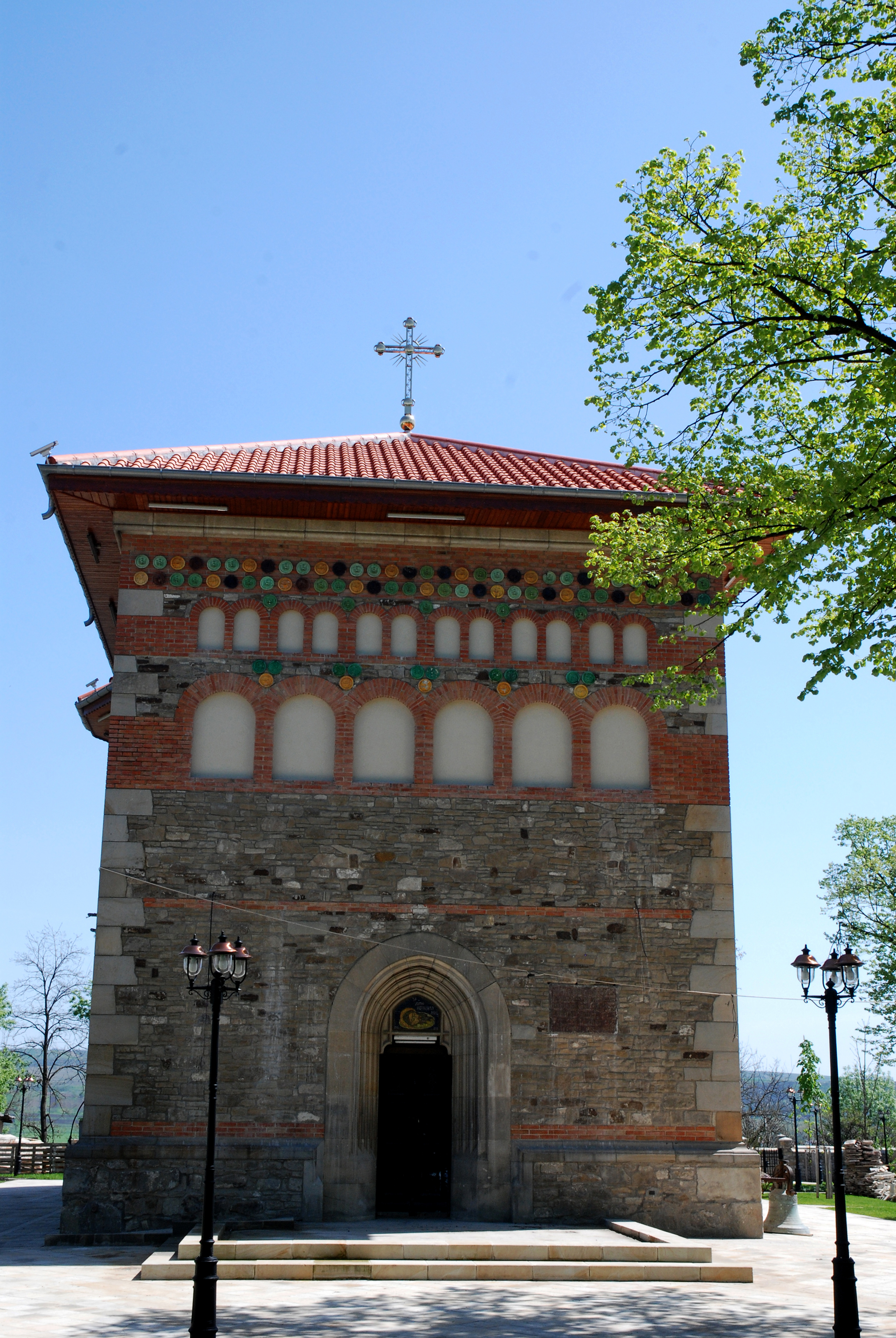
Western side of the church

Gheorghe Ioanide painted the interior in 1894, employing the neoclassical Romanian style. The stained glass windows add a decorative touch. Liturgical objects from the 18th and 19th centuries are preserved inside, including icons, silver items and religious books. The grave of the Șubin family, the final owners of Vaslui, is located nearby.

The church is listed as a historic monument by Romania's Ministry of Culture and Religious Affairs.
