= Huși Cathedral =

- Catedrala Episcopală din Huși
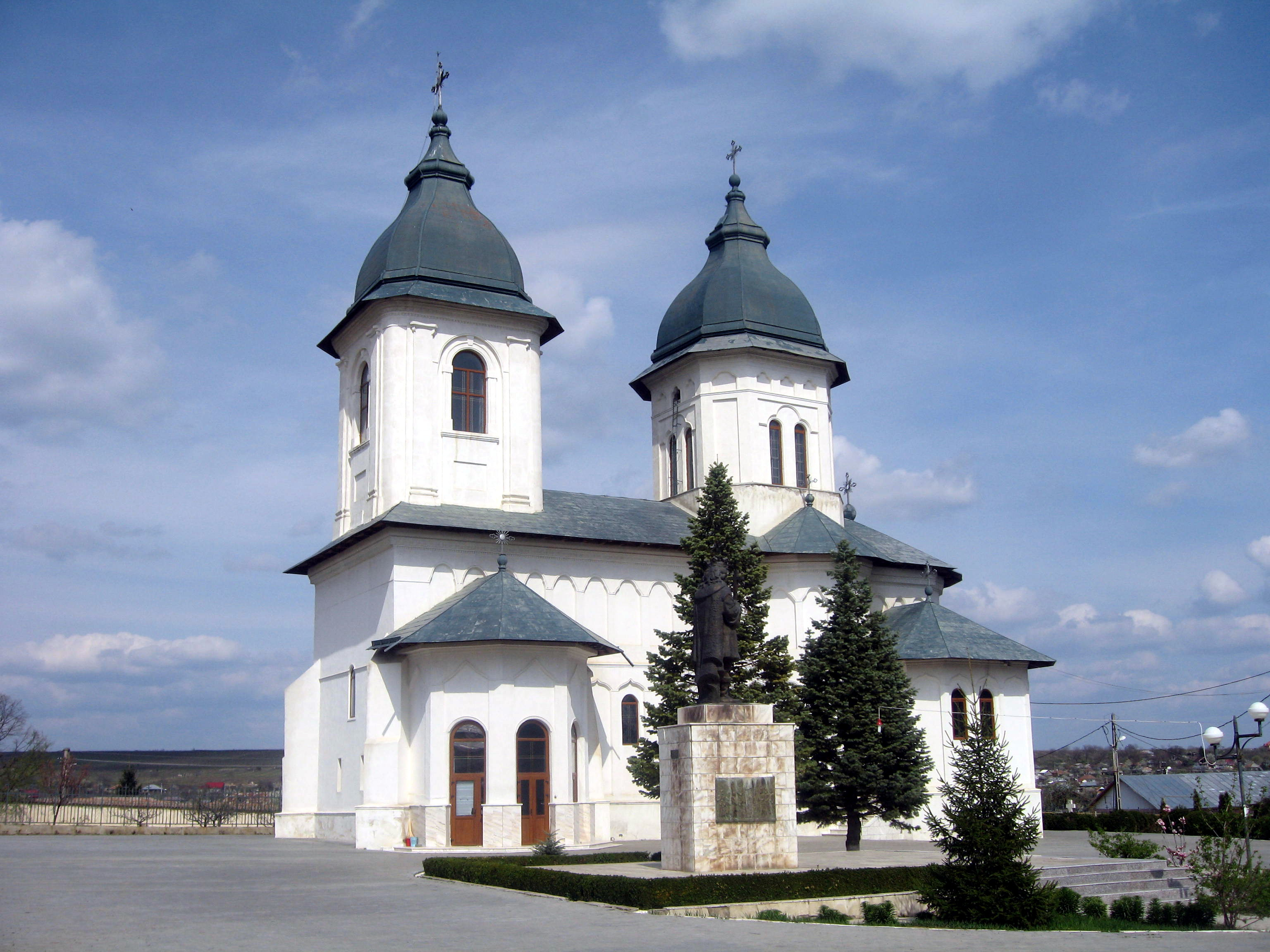
- Huși Cathedral
- 46.6767°N 28.0578°E
- Location: Huși
- Country: Romania
- Denomination: Romanian Orthodox Church

History
- Status: Cathedral
- Founded: 1495
- Founder: Stephen the Great
- Dedication: Saints Peter and Paul

Architecture
- Functional status: Active

Administration
- Diocese: Diocese of Huși

The Huși Cathedral (Romanian: Catedrala Episcopală din Huși) is a Romanian Orthodox cathedral in Huși, Vaslui County, Romania. The church was founded by Stephen the Great in 1495, before being rebuilt from the ground up by Bishop Inochentie of Huși between 1753-1756.

The cathedral, the bishop's palace, the princely houses' cellars, the bell tower and the surrounding wall were included in the list of historic monuments for Vaslui County in 2015, with the classification code VS-II-a-A-06839.

== Churchyard ==
Also in the churchyard is a wooden cross, which was carved by Archimandrite Mina Dobzeu, the Bessarabian monk who baptized Nicolae Steinhardt on March 15, 1960, in a communist prison.
