= Tazlău Monastery =

Coordinates: 46.7255°N 26.4628°E

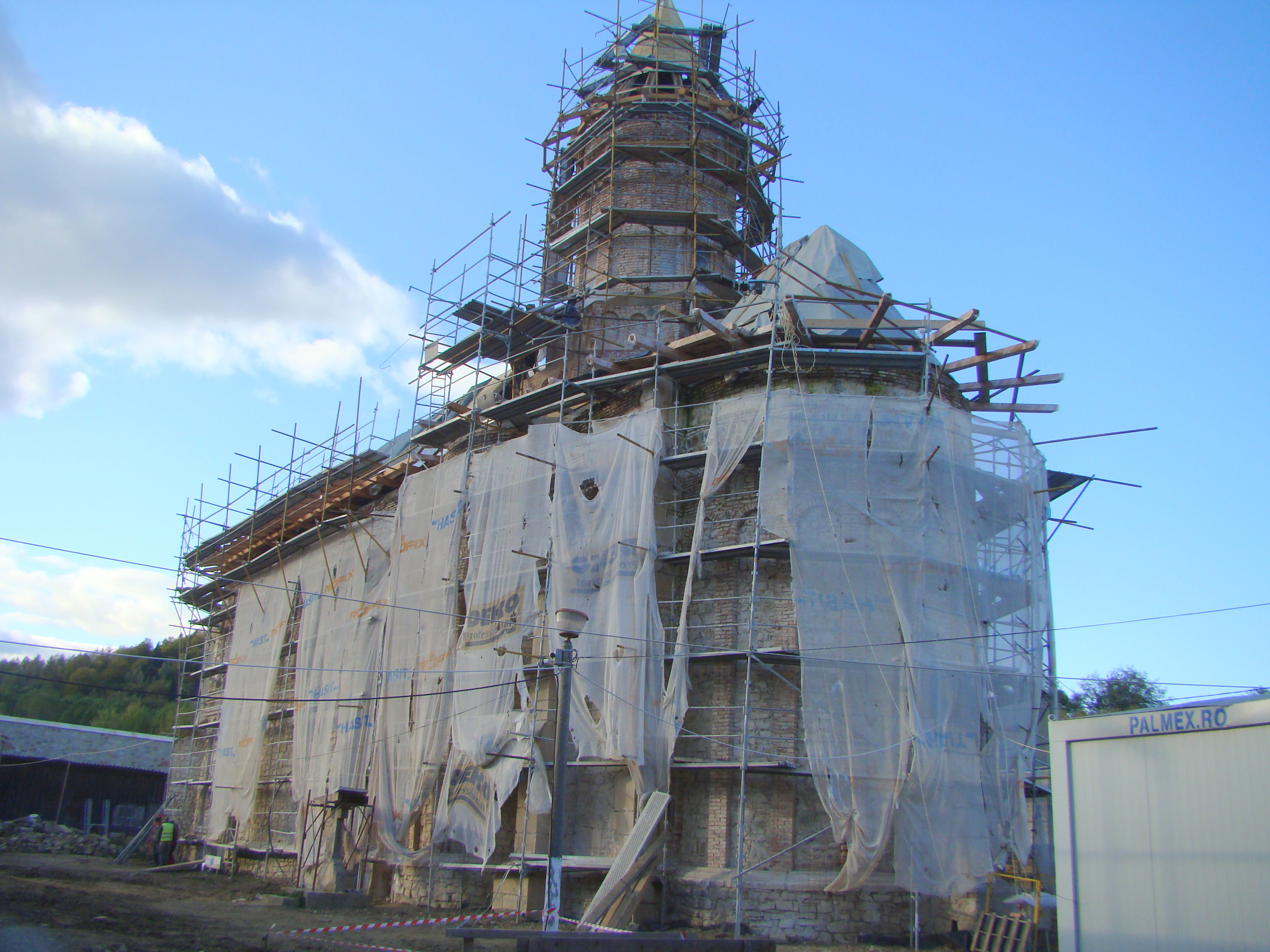
Tazlău Monastery in 2020

Tazlău Monastery (Romanian: Mănăstirea Tazlău) is a Romanian Orthodox Christian monastery located at 188 Ștefan cel Mare Street, Tazlău, Neamț County, Romania.

== History and description ==
Dedicated to the Nativity of Mary, the monastery was established in 1497, with prince Stephen the Great as ktitor. A wooden church build by Alexander the Good previously stood on the site. A fire in 1879 forced its closure. The church was rebuilt as a village parish in 1894. The bell tower was reconstructed in Russian style in 1902. In 1990, following the Romanian Revolution, monastic life returned to Tazlău.

The church was built of stone between 1496 and 1497. Trefoil in shape, with an altar, nave and vestibule, the walls are over a meter thick. The closed porch was added later, under Alexandru Lăpușneanu. The altar is lighted by two windows of differing sizes. The iconostasis, of carved linden wood, is painted and gilt. The nave has narrow apses, slightly pronounced, and is lighted by a northerly and a southerly window. The spire, which tops the nave, rests on four semicircular corners, forming a narrow circle. The vestibule has windows to the north and south, and is separated from the nave by a semicircular wall resting on two supports. The nave and vestibule windows are narrow, arched and covered in metal grilles; they are a meter high, and set some 3.5 m from ground level. The porch has two large rectangular windows framed in wood, also with a grille. Entry is through the south; the massive oak door is reinforced by metal. The western wall of the porch has lists of all the village's soldiers killed during World War I and II. The altar walls are covered in wood; in the nave, with white hexagonal and pentagonal alabaster; in the vestibule and porch, with plaques of quarried stone. The church roof is of white slate and extends well beyond the structure it covers.

The interior painting was redone in 1858-1859 by Greek artists, assisted by Romanians. It is realistic in style and mainly uses tempera. The contract specified oil painting was to be employed, but the Greeks only did so when supervisors were present. The western wall of the vestibule features an oil portrait of the ktitors. Located above the door, it depicts Stephen and his wife Maria Voichița between his sons Alexandru and Bogdan. The prince and his wife are shown holding the church in their hands, without the porch. He has a beard and long hair over his back, looking to the ground. She wears a green Byzantine costume with a wool coat on top, reaching from her shoulders to her feet. The inscription is in Romanian Cyrillic. Christ and an enthroned Mary are painted above the founders. The exterior decoration consists of two rows of small circular recesses beneath the roof. Additionally, there is a series of rectangular niches going around the facade.

The bell tower is located 15 m east of the church. The grounds are entered through a passage beneath it. The structure was initially built in Renaissance style under Petru Rareș. A 1988 renovation involved removing the roof and raising the wall, thus restoring the original style, lost during the 1902 repairs. The tower is 14 m high at the roof, 7 m long and 6 m wide. It has three bells; the largest, cast at Neamț Monastery, weighs 575 kg. The church was equipped with a stone defensive wall, in the manner of fortresses. This was equipped with ramparts and buttresses on the exterior. On the interior, the extensive foundations of the princely house are still preserved. Archaeological excavations on the north and west sides have uncovered remains of former monastic cells.

The monastery complex is listed as a historic monument by Romania's Ministry of Culture and Religious Affairs. Five components are given separate entries: the church; the palace, cellar and refectory ruins; the bell tower; the watchtower; and the defensive wall.
