= Dimitrie Petrino =

Romanian poet (1838–1878)

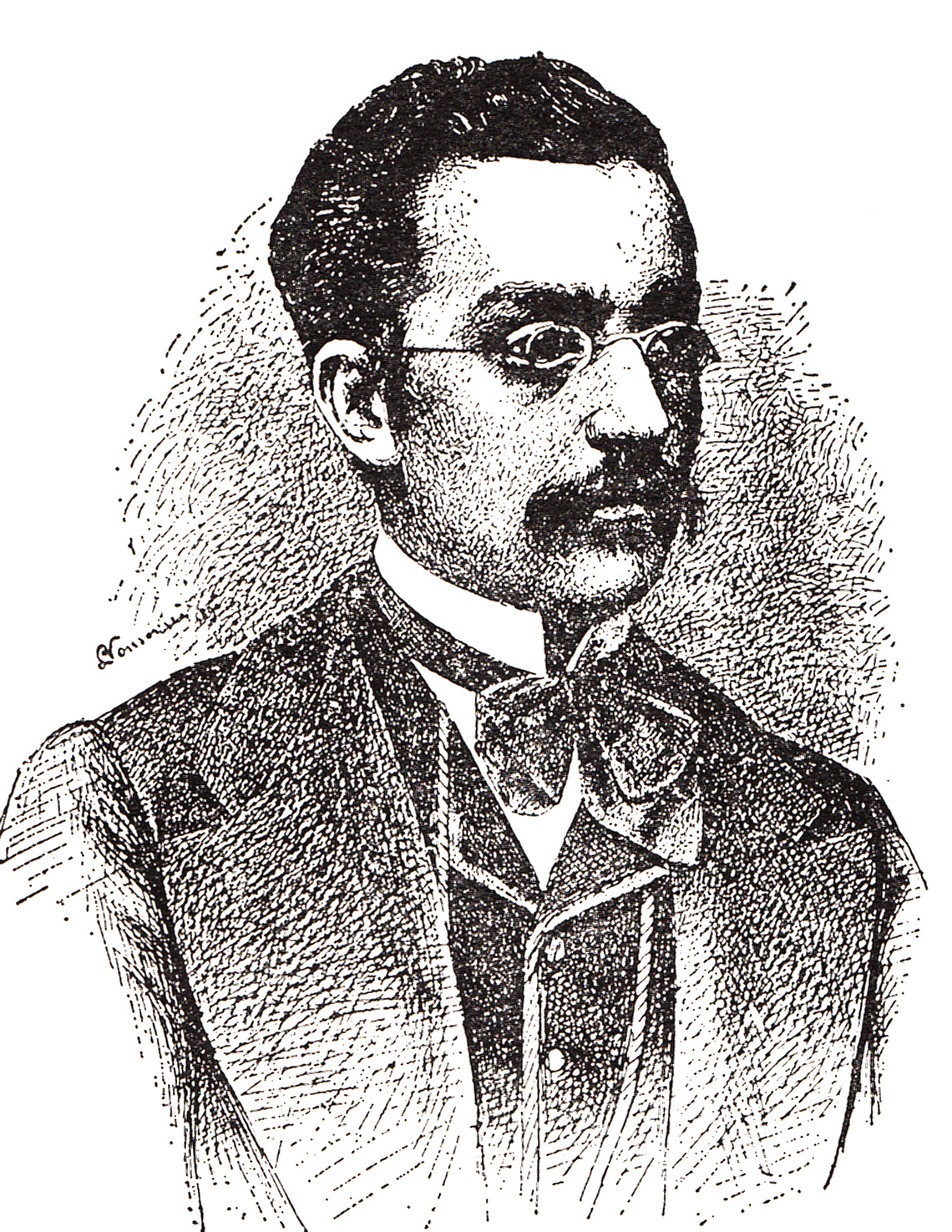
Dimitrie Petrino (posthumous portrait, 1891)

Dimitrie Petrino (1838 (?)—April 29, 1878) was a Bessarabian-born Romanian poet.

Born in Rujnița, a village in the Bessarabia Governorate's Soroca County within the Russian Empire, his parents were Petre Petrino, a rural landowner, and his wife Eufrosina (née Hurmuzachi). He studied at home under the guidance of a Nicolae Sbierea and perhaps of his uncles the Hurmuzachi brothers. As a young man, he travelled to Italy, Austria and Germany, adopting somewhat of a literary culture, albeit not in organized fashion. Between 1864 and 1867, he was a military officer at Botoșani in the Romanian Old Kingdom; after his wife's death, he again travelled abroad before settling in Czernowitz (Cernăuți), the capital of Bukovina region in Austria-Hungary. Returning to Romania in 1875, Petrino settled at Iași, where he became director of the Central Library. From 1876 to 1878, he was Andrei Vizanti's substitute as professor in the Romanian literature department of Iași University. In 1877, he was elected a corresponding member of the Romanian Academy.

His contributions appeared in Convorbiri Literare, Familia and Foaia Soțietății pentru literatura și cultura română în Bucovina. His verses appeared in several volumes: Flori de mormânt, 1867; Lumine și umbre, 1870; Raul, 1875; La gura sobei, 1876 and Legenda Murului, 1877. Although written in a pure and flowing language, they only manage to convey with difficulty the author's sentiments, however sincere, and to create the image of the satanic poet the reader feels he wishes to create. He died in Bucharest.
