= Popăuți Monastery =

Monastery in Botoșani, Romania

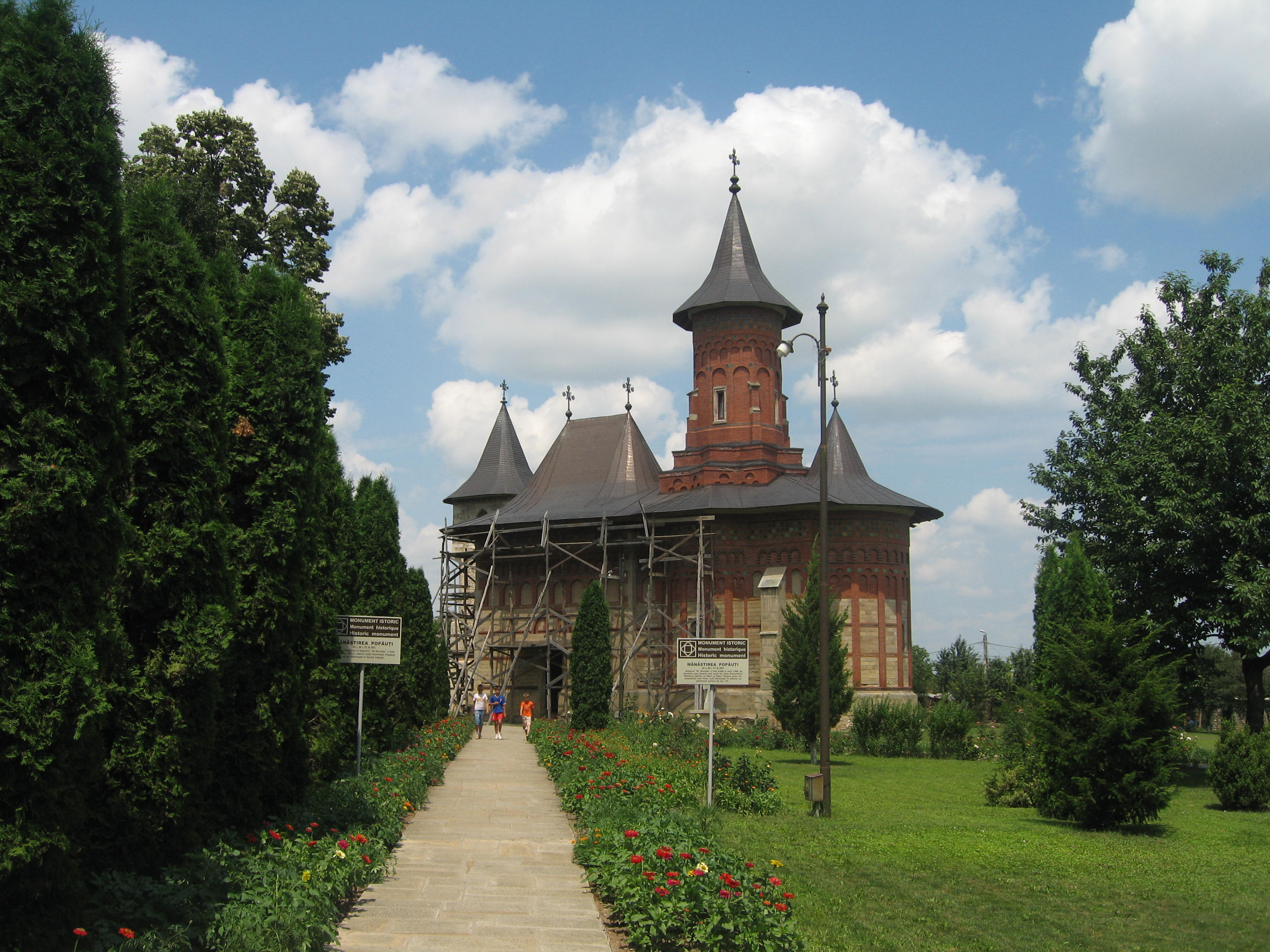
- Popăuți Monastery

- Location within Romania

Monastery information
- Established: 1496

People
- Important associated figures: Stephen III of Moldavia

Site
- Location: Botoșani, Botoșani County, Romania
- Coordinates: 47°45′21.3″N 26°38′44″E
- Visible remains: church, inner court and earthworks
- Public access: yes

Popăuţi Monastery is a monastery located in Botoșani, Romania, on Ştefan cel Mare Street no. 41, near the train station. It was founded in 1496 by the voivode Stephen the Great (1457-1504).

It is listed as a historic monument by Romania's Ministry of Culture and National Identity.
