= List of Romanians of Armenian descent =

A list of notable Romanians of Armenian descent:

== Arts ==
- Theodor Aman, painter, engraver and art professor
- Vartan Arachelian, journalist and writer
- Anda Călugăreanu, actress
- Corina Chiriac, singer, composer, lyricist, television director and actress
- Lorand Gaspar, poet
- Bedros Horasangian, writer, essayist, and journalist
- Garabet Ibrăileanu, literary critic
- Mihail Jora, composer and conductor
- Leon Kalustian, journalist
- Ioan Missir, novelist
- Petru Th. Missir, literary critic
- David Ohanesian, operatic baritone
- Harry Tavitian, jazz musician
- Krikor Zambaccian, art collector, founder of the Zambaccian Museum

== Politics and Administration ==
- Virgil Madgearu, politician, economist, and sociologist
- Basile M. Missir, politician
- Vasile Morţun, socialist activist
- Grigore Trancu-Iaşi, economist and politician
- Varujan Vosganian, economist and political figure
- Varujan Pambuccian, mathematician, information technologist and political figure
- Iacob Zadig, general

== Religion ==
- Vazgen I (1908–1994), Catholicos of Armenia from 1953 to 1994
- Zareh Baronian, theologian

== Sports ==
- Florin Halagian, football manager

== Others ==
- Manuc Bei, innkeeper, founder of Hanul lui Manuc
- Spiru Haret, sociologist, mathematician, physicist, and politician

== See also ==
- Armenians of Romania
- Lists of Armenians
