= Leon Kalustian =

Romanian journalist (1908–1990)

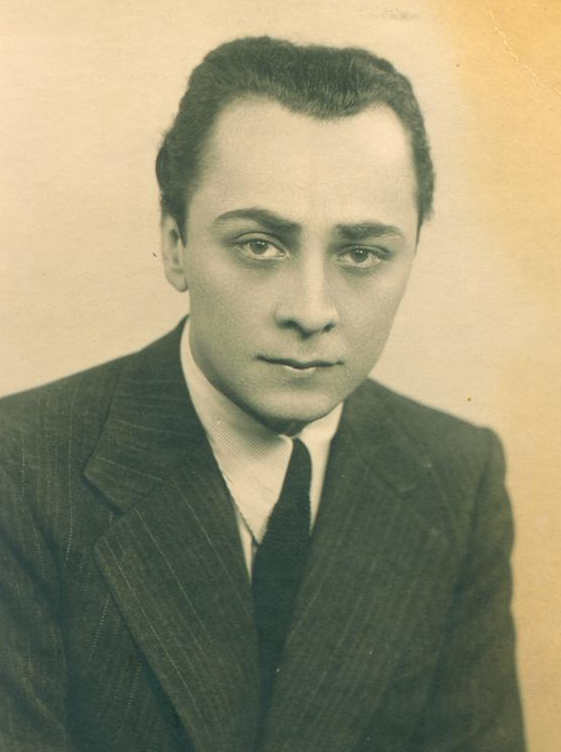
- Portrait photograph of Kalustian, c. 1930
- Born: October 17, 1908; Focșani, Kingdom of Romania
- Died: January 24, 1990 (aged 81); Focșani, Romania
- Occupations: Journalist, secretary, antiquarian bookseller, construction worker
- Writing career
- Pen name: Vladimir Elka, Kalvincar
- Period: 1926–1985
- Genres: Political fiction, biography, memoir, essay, sports journalism
- Website: Leonkalustian.ro

Leon or Levon Kalustian, also known as Calustian (Armenian: Լևոն Գալուստեան, Levon Kalustyan; October 17, 1908 – January 24, 1990), was a Romanian journalist, essayist and memoirist. An Armenian on his father's side, he abandoned his studies to work in the interwar press, taking editorial positions at Cuvântul, Curentul, and finally Mișcarea. As a left-winger who ultimately joined the Social Democratic Party, he took a side in public controversies, defending the political line espoused by Nicolae Titulescu and attacking Stelian Popescu. Kalustian was allegedly a collaborator of Siguranța's secret policemen, and remained close to the disgraced spy chief, Eugen Cristescu. While retiring from political journalism with the advent of a dictatorial regime, under the National Renaissance Front, he accepted various commissions from the Front, and was employed by its official newspaper România.

Identified as an enemy by the communist regime, which took over in 1948, Kalustian was detained without trial for some four years, and did penal labor as a steel fixer. He was then again arrested, and sentenced, for having kept and sold books banned by state censorship. Ultimately released in 1964, Kalustian was allowed to publish again from 1966. He was still exposed to acts of persecution and to constant surveillance by the Securitate, and harassed into becoming its informant. From the late 1970s, Flacăra magazine hosted his regular columns, leading both the public and the regime to rediscover him as a progressive author. Despite this take, Kalustian networked with anti-communists such as Nicolae Carandino and Corneliu Coposu, both predicting and working toward the eventual fall of communism. He lived to witness the Romanian Revolution of 1989, dying a month later in his native town of Focșani.

== Biography ==
=== Early life ===
Born in Focșani, his parents were Sarchis Kalustian (1867–1921) and Iulia (née Gherghel; 1876–1948). His father was from Ottoman Armenia, while his mother was an ethnic Romanian from Transylvania. Leon (or Levon) was the oldest of four children: two sisters, Vartuhi (1910–1998) and Satenig (1916–1996), and a brother, Manuil (1911–1985). The latter three lived their entire lives in the family home, at Tunelului Street 4. In late 1937, Kalustian's enemies at Universul daily circulated alleged fragments from the Kalustian file at Focșani's civil registry. These informed that Sarchis and Iulia were an unmarried couple, and non-citizens; he was a Gregorian Christian, and she a Catholic.

According to fellow Armenian Romanian journalist Bedros Horasangian, who conversed with him in the 1980s, Kalustian, "despite the ancient pedigree of [his] Armenian family, could not speak Armenian, but had instead splendidly mastered the Romanian language". He was generally identified as an Armenian, or more generally as a Levantine, by his literary peers, including Carandino and Victor Eftimiu. The latter reportedly viewed him as a figure out of a saray, "a tray of sorbet on his head". Young Leon attended one year of high school in his native town and beyond that was self-taught. His detractors at Universul report that his original employment was as a "servant boy in Ianculescu's barber shop, at Focșani." Settling early in the national capital Bucharest, his first published work appeared in Cuvântul newspaper in 1926; he was an editor for Cuvântul (1926–1927), Curentul (1928–1934), Mișcarea (1931–1932) and România (1938–1940). Other publications to which he contributed include Dimineața, Adevărul, Facla, Azi, Lumea Românească, Reporter, Adevărul Literar și Artistic, România Literară, Manuscriptum, and Luceafărul. Pen names he used included Democrit, Elka, Lucullus, Kalunkar, Al. Teodoru, Vladimir, L.K. and Kalvincar. The last one was formed from his surname and those of his fellow Facla columnists Carandino and Ion Vinea.

The early interwar years consolidated Kalustian's reputation as a "great erudite" and a leading socialist publicist. In June 1933, he married Iza Dora Aronovici, a Jewish woman from Vaslui nine years his senior. Although Kalustian's charm, which assured his place in high society, caused friction within the marriage, the union endured. As recounted by Carandino, Kalustian spent little time writing, and more time networking, managing to establish close rapports with politicians, from Alexandru Vaida-Voevod to Grigore Iunian. His youth was spent on "poker games, the racetrack, tea parties with the madams", as well as "success in women". During his Curentul stage, he sided with the left-wing sections of the National Peasants' Party (PNȚ). This implied taking up the fight against Carol Caraiman, the disgraced and exiled Crown Prince, who was attempting to return as King of Romania. Carol finally staged a coup against the Romanian Regency on June 6, 1930, isolating his opponents and taking the throne for himself; Kalustian and the "old political reporter" Paul Costin were tasked with removing anti-Carlist content from that night's edition of Curentul. These events, Kalustian notes, meant that Curentul had to move from "diatribes to dithyrambs" when it came to Carol; in order to ensure an "indirect transition", he was tasked with focusing all attention on the "Georgist" Liberals, which were new and radical arrivals on the Romanian political scene.

=== At Titulescu's side ===
The Georgists' eponymous leader, Gheorghe I. Brătianu, eventually asked the 21-year-old Kalustian, or "Vladimir Elka", to work at Mișcarea alongside Dem. Theodorescu (recommended by Kalustian as a "great and incomparable journalist"), Ion Pas, and Sergiu Milorian. Emerging as a feared polemicist, Kalustian defended democratic values and launched virulent attacks on Universul owner Stelian Popescu. As an adversary in such polemics, Petre Pandrea recorded his belief that Kalustian was an agent of the interwar secret service, or Siguranța, who primarily informed his superiors about the goings-on in journalist circles. More specifically, Universul claimed to expose Kalustian as "secret agent No. 48", noting that "such work, albeit in service to the state, does not call for Romanian citizenship." The claims were partly confirmed by a Siguranța report of November 1934, which suggests that he continued to work as an informant for Eugen Cristescu after the latter had been ousted from his position as director of that agency. According to that report, Kalustian and diplomat Nicolae Titulescu colluded with the PNȚ to have Cristescu reinstated.

A 1935 interview in Facla includes details on Kalustian's social and political outlook, including his statement that it was impossible not to write about the "social inequities [creating] two worlds, one of the satiated and the other of the famished". Early that year, Rampa announced that Kalustian had completed a political novel on the Škoda Affair, but that state censorship was sure to confiscate it: "The author will print it, though, if not for the general public then at least for his friends." The work was probably almost entirely based on public records of the scandal. In May, Zorile newspaper put out Kalustian's protest against the censoring of a conference by his friend, Silviu Rusu, in which Rusu wished to speak about Jiddu Krishnamurti; the audience was reportedly chased out by the Romanian Police. Kalustian's text intimated that Rusu was a fellow left-wing activist—though, according to scholar Liviu Bordaș, this was an exaggeration on his part.

During the early 1930s, Titulescu established his international profile as a peace activist, and was elected chairman of the League of Nations. Kalustian joined him on his international tours; a diary note by novelist Camil Petrescu reports a conversation between himself and Kalustian, in which the latter confided that he was hired to exaggerate Titulescu's impact of Europe's political affairs. After one appearance in Weimar Germany:

We went to a hotel and, once there, he asked me to write down my article on his conference. I wrote down the title: A Conference by Mr Titulescu. He said: "Come now, you're a smart boy... Why then have this 'a conference' business? Write down: 'A brilliant conference...'." I went on: "Last night, in front of a large audience". He: "What's this then, 'a large audience'? Write down: 'in front of a large and distinguished audience, comprising, among various others, Messrs Stresemann, Brüning', just add all their names, to hell with them."

In July 1936, Kalustian concentrated on warning his readers about the unchecked excesses of fascist paramilitaries from both the Iron Guard and the Lăncieri:

the capital's streets are taken over by gangs of blue- or green-shirted individuals, calling themselves 'students'. [...] they stalk from the darkness, to hit from behind, they jump, twenty armed beasts at a time, on just one man, who's unarmed, they empty their guns into peaceful men, they set alight firecrackers to conceal their own escape, they handle stilettos and set fie to newspapers—to those newspapers which stand up against the return to barbarity, to prehistory.

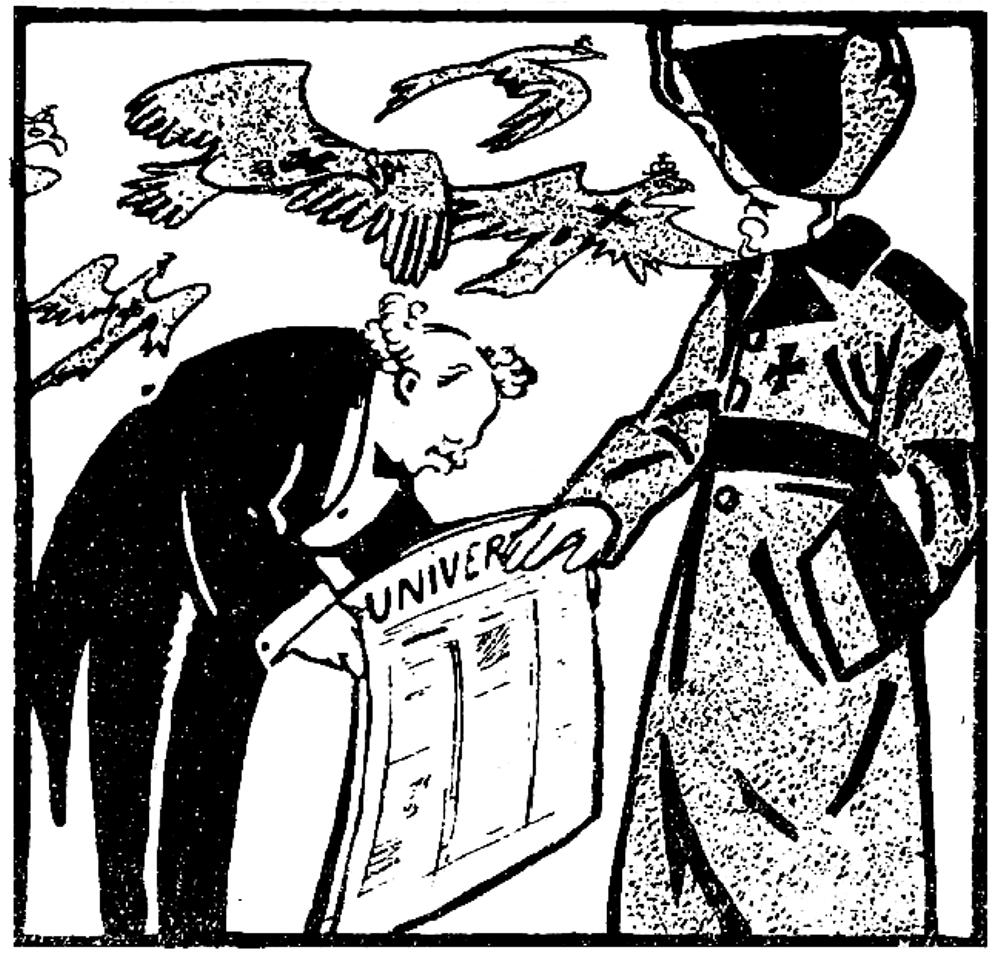
Interwar caricature of Stelian Popescu kowtowing to August von Mackensen

Kalustian's articles covered the assassination of Mihai Stelescu, founder of the dissident Crusade of Romanianism, by his former colleagues in the Guard. Kalustian confirmed for his readers that Stelescu had been "chopped to pieces", and sarcastically added: "They didn't eat him." In late 1936, writing for Dimineața, Kalustian took the side of petty clerks driven into poverty by the Great Depression, warning that a revolt was looming. During 1937, he published pieces defending his patron Titulescu after the latter had been sidelined by an informal coalition of his various enemies (whom Kalustian called "dunces").

=== Anti-Carlism and wartime ===
Writer Aurel Baranga worked with Kalustian at Lumea Românească in 1936–1937, describing him as a man of "sparkling, lively, unrelenting intelligence". Critic and left-wing essayist Șerban Cioculescu recalled in 1975 his "great satisfaction" at reading Kalustian's renewed attacks on "the immense nonentity that was Stelian Popescu, who had fashioned himself into an 'apostle' of nationalism and a great newspaperman". At the time, Universul saw Kalustian, Geo Bogza and Mircea Damian as press agents for the Jewish industrialist Max Auschnitt, "commissioned to besmirch, with their Judaic mud, with their filthy posters and rags, all men who espouse the notion of a Romanian rebirth". Kalustian rated as one of his accomplishments having published in Lumea Românească letters which showed Popescu to have been a "traitor" during the 1916–1918 occupation of southern Romania by the Central Powers. These documents purportedly evidenced that Popescu tied to reach a deal with August von Mackensen, who was overseeing the occupation forces.

By 1937, Kalustian was supporting Titulescu in his conflict with King Carol's camarilla. In November of that year, Titulescu made a return visit to Romania; Gavrilă Marinescu's Police closely monitored those in contact with him, including both Kalustian and Stelian Popescu. Kalustian reportedly claimed to have served time in prison, on Carol's orders, for his "biting articles against the camarilla". In early 1938, Carol's personal regime was set up at the detriment of all other parties, eventually establishing the catch-all National Renaissance Front (FRN). Kalustian quit political journalism, which he did not resume for forty years; as later noted by novelist Constantin Țoiu, "a gag was shoved into [Kalustian's] mouth" by the successive fascist governments. Kalustian was still featured with sports commentary in Cezar Petrescu's România, where, in September, he chronicled the national football team's defeat by a Greater Germany squad. According to Kalustian, this upset was only met possible by the annexations of March, whereby "first-rate" Austrian players had changed kits.

In his memoirs, diplomat Constantin Virgil Gheorghiu alleges that Kalustian had a more secretive role at România—namely, ensuing that the newspaper stayed in line with government policies dictated by Armand Călinescu, the FRN Interior Minister. Vartan Arachelian, a younger Armenian journalist who met Kalustian and Carandino later in their lives, argues that both were mostly unwilling to share details on their employment by România. As he notes, the collaboration with a newspaper of the authoritarian right clashed with their left-wing credentials, and also made them targets for retribution by the Romanian Communist Party. In his memoirs, Carandino made a note of his employment there and his good pay at a time when "many of my left-wing colleagues were unemployed"; he also recounts that Kalustian and Emil Serghie negotiated the terms of his recruitment. Overall:

Once dictatorships had settled in, [Kalustian] preferred to act from the shadows, to act a very important role which his friends, especially those on the left, were able to profit from. Unexpectedly, a truly worthy journalist was withdrawing from the spotlight, but without his presence being any less sensed."

Kalustian was also employed as a personal secretary by România's editor-in-chief, Cezar Petrescu. During April 1940, just before the fall of France, the two visited France and the United Kingdom. Kalustian used this occasion to meet up with the gravely ill Titulescu, one final time, at the Paris Ritz. Forty years later, he went public with the claim that Titulescu had entrusted him with all three copies of his final will, which he was to present to Iuliu Maniu, Ion Mihalache, and Savel Rădulescu, respectively. The text instructed them to have Titulescu's body reburied at Brașov "once peace will have been reinstated throughout the world". In August, România recorded Kalustian's presence in the group which saw Grigore Gafencu, the newly appointed Ambassador to the Soviet Union, off on his voyage to Moscow. In 1941, the Iron Guard established a "National Legionary State", leaving Kalustian as a silent witness of fascist violence. According to his own account, he was impressed and inspired when a "simple plowman", Marin Ailincăi of Tomești, undermined Guardist pretensions with his sarcastic wit.

=== Communist imprisonments ===
After the August 1944 coup and during the latter stages of World War II, Kalustian returned to public life as a moderate left-wing journalist, rejecting collaboration with the Communist Party. He joined the Romanian Social Democratic Party, whereupon he sided with the anti-communist inner-faction, formed around Constantin Titel Petrescu. He recorded rumors of devastation by the Soviet occupation forces, and, in late years, claimed that the Constantin Stere archive in Bucov had been destroyed by a Red Army squad; the information is contradicted by other accounts, which suggest that the Stere documents were either destroyed or scattered by an unnamed caretaker. The communized Siguranța began keeping him under watch. In 1945, one of its informants reported rumors from high-society, namely that Kalustian was an asset of the British Special Operations Executive, recruited into a network headed by chanteuse Maria Tănase.

Arrested in May 1951 under the early communist regime, Kalustian was held without trial for four years at Jilava, Gherla, and Văcărești prisons. In 1953, he also did time in the comparatively liberal camp of Onești, where he and aristocrat Mihail Dim. Sturdza worked as steel fixers. Sturdza reports that Kalustian was able to coax a prison guard into letting them communicate with the outside world by means of "little notes". In a 2009 article, his younger friend Florin Condurățeanu provided anecdotes from Kalustian's past, including one detaling his near-collapse from the constant labor (Condurățeanu reports this incident as having taken place at another prison facility, namely the Danube–Black Sea Canal).

Returning to Bucharest, Kalustian lived in relative seclusion, and refused travel about town unless it was in a friend's car. He also began writing daily editorials expressing his real thoughts on politics; with no possibility that they would actually be published, he kept them under lock and key. Between 1956 and 1960, having no other means of subsistence, he sold books clandestinely, an activity closely monitored by the Securitate secret police. His case officer, Idel Cohn, opened a file on Kalustian as a "clandestine antiquarian". In December 1960, a search of his home resulted in the seizure of hundreds of books, rare editions, manuscripts, documents, magazines, important works of Romanian and world literature. These had been acquired over time and came from his personal library; additionally, personal observations, notes and letters addressed to his family were impounded. Arrested the following day, Kalustian was tried in September 1961. The court sentenced him to eight years' imprisonment and confiscation of his entire property, the crime being distribution of banned publications. Among these were Stere's În preajma revoluției, Queen Marie's Povestea vieții mele, Mustul care fierbe by Octavian Goga and the Memoirs of King Carol I, all considered dangerous for the socialist order.

Following a mass amnesty, Kalustian was released from Gherla in April 1964. In 1966–1967, Ilie Purcaru commissioned him to write a series commemorating Titulescu in the provincial magazine Ramuri. In October 1967, militiamen descended on his home (located on Maria Rosetti Street) as part of an intimidation campaign against former political prisoners. Searching for books considered subversive, they sealed his large collection. Pandrea, himself newly released from prison, argues in his journal that some were avoiding Kalustian, whom they perceived as a Securitate informant. Pandrea did not dismiss this claim, but rather viewed it as irrelevant, since "those of us who are not natural-born conspirators will have no fear of agents." Arachelian notes that, through relentless "political persecution", Kalustian was indeed forced into becoming an informant.

Kalustian's first book, the 1975 Facsimile, appeared late; it comprised in large part his literary correspondence with teacher Nicolae Bănescu, and, Cioculescu notes, revealed the author's "exceptional sensitivity" and "frantic dedication" to his subject. The Bănescu letters expanded on historical-biographical studies on figures such as C. A. Rosetti, Nicolae Iorga and George Vâlsan, focusing on details that Kalustian selected as especially moving. Facsimile was followed by Conspirații sub cer deschis (1976), a selection of his anti-fascist, pro-democracy articles from 1936 to 1938. Both editions were curated by literary scholar Valeriu Râpeanu, under contract with Editura Eminescu. Conspirații... was positively reviewed by Ioan Enache in the Communist Party daily, Scînteia. According to Enache, Kalustian "provides today's reader with the reliable image of a tormented epoch, riddled with contradictions, as rendered from within and in lockstep with the events themselves. This book eloquently demonstrates the militant calling of our progressive press." In April 1977, the same newspaper also hosted Baranga's musings about Kalustian, signalling him as one who had stood on the "barricade against fascism", with "remarkable civic courage". Baranga also argued that the work was useful in an era of neo-fascism "across the continents"—referring to groups such as Ordine Nero.

In private, Kalustian enjoyed a good rapport with Armenian Arșavir Acterian, who had spent time in communist prisons for his affiliation with the Iron Guard; as reported by Horasangian, the two men jokingly competed as to who had been jailed longer (Kalustian won by only a few months), and exchanged anecdotes of real life. During the early 1970s, Kalustian also resumed his friendship with Carandino, himself a survivor of communist imprisonment; their other friend was another former inmate, the Jewish folklorist Harry Brauner. They attended a clandestine coffee shop on Hristo Botev Street, becoming known as the Three Musketeers. The group was able to connect with other journalists and Securitate men, and obtained regular access to foreign magazines. These were secretly taken out of packages received by a Securitate general, and circulated widely before being returned and re-sent. Kalustian also made return visits to Focșani, where, around 1974, he met the aspiring Armenian poet Varujan Vosganian, to whom he sent books (including Vosganian's first-ever dictionary).

=== Rediscovery ===
In December 1977, Kalustian was one of 21 men and women who expressed solidarity with the communist regime, against the dissident movement launched by Paul Goma; the list, which was kept in the Securitate archive, also included public intellectuals such as Constantin Abăluță, Eugen Barbu, Fănuș Neagu, Zigu Ornea, Marin Preda and Dan Zamfirescu. Though Kalustian returned to journalism in 1978, publishing a column in Adrian Păunescu's Flacăra, he continued to be monitored by the Securitate. This literary recovery was reportedly arranged by Arachelian, who also aired an interview with Kalustian for state television; this institution then produced a documentary film about the literary life at Casa Capșa, with Kalustian as the narrator. In 1980, poems about Kalustian, penned by his generation colleague Vlaicu Bârna, appeared in Bârna's collection Sandala lui Empedocle—critic Ovid Crohmălniceanu argues that they are among the more accomplished fragments of that volume. Kalustian was additionally featured as a raconteur in a Titulescu issue put out in early 1982 by Revista Română, which was published in four languages and circulated abroad.

Horasangian credits Kalustian's "discovery" to Păunescu, and notes that the columns produced as a result were "not at all bad"; in a 2014 retrospective, the younger journalist Sever Voinescu similarly credits Păunescu, but also sees Kalustian, "one of the most brilliant interwar journalists", as being used as an asset during a "deceptive relaxation" of the Romanian regime. Kalustian ultimately collected his columns in five volumes, which appeared to generally positive reviews between 1980 and 1985 as Simple note. Commenting on their literary classification, critic Al. Dobrescu found Kalustian the essayist to be midway between Iorga and Lazăr Șăineanu, "but without the former's stylistic vigor or the latter's meticulousness." Also according to Dobrescu, much of the information they communicated was already public knowledge—with notable exceptions whenever Kalustian discussed the lesser-known writers, from Constantin Beldie and Cora Irineu to Nicolae P. Leonăchescu. The critic was upset that Kalustian never seemed interested in recounting his personal meetings with N. D. Cocea and George Mihail Zamfirescu, with the articles on them veering into a "deluge of musings, either restrained or pathetic, about the human condition, the cruelties of life, and other such things." Another reviewer, Teodor Vârgolici, praised Simple note for the "masterful bridging of personal recollections and authentic document"—but disliked Kalustian's negative musings about diarist Gala Galaction, which he read as "personal resentments".

By 1982, Conspirații... had come to be used as evidence in the debates opposing national communists to liberal socialists. Speaking for the former camp, Constantin Sorescu noted that fragments of Carandino's articles had casually exposed good relations between Romanian nationalist figures of the interwar and various categories of Jews; he used such details against Ornea, who had begun exploring the history of Romanian antisemitism. One such episode referred to the collaboration between right-wing publicist Pamfil Șeicaru and Jewish book editor Lazăr Șaraga—Ornea, who stood accused of having ignored this episode in his book, responded that the collaboration, and Șeicaru's career as a whole, were only marginally relevant to his monograph; in his response to Sorescu, he paid tribute to Kalustian as a "venerable left-wing journalist". Sorescu also cited Kalustian as a source about the good relations supposedly existing between two capitalist exploiters—Popescu, who was a nominal antisemite, and Max Auschnitt. Sorescu argued that such details could disprove the claims advanced by Ornea.

Unconfirmed rumors circulating by word of mouth had it that Kalustian had been preparing a more acid set of memoirs, called Requiem la o meserie care nu mai există. The title, which translates to "Requiem to a Deceased Craft", was supposedly a jibe at the communist regime, which had destroyed journalism by attaching it to the propaganda apparatus. In that context, Carandino was also allowed to publish a book of memoirs, but only after a lengthy negotiation with the communist censors—according to Arachelian, Kalustian found the process to be ridiculous. Their works drew attention from other literati and political figures, leading them to establish an "Artists' Club" at the coffee shop on Sfinților Street. The owner, Gheorghe Florescu, recalls that they were joined there by Corneliu Coposu, once a regional PNȚ leader, and by film actor Cornel Coman. They would often discuss politics from an anti-communist perspective, though they had to interrupt themselves when a Securitate colonel stopped in for coffee. According to Florescu, during one such encounter in May 1980 (shortly after Coman's death) Kalustian made several accurate predictions about the outcome of the US presidential election, the eventual breakup of Yugoslavia, and the global fall of communism.

=== Final years ===
Florescu reports that, in early 1983, Kalustian and Carandino, together with lawyer Mircea Traian Biju, were engaged in a conspiracy to foment revolt against communist leader Nicolae Ceaușescu. Though noting that the Securitate was probably unaware of this activity, Florescu proposes that the Mossad was both aware and involved. In June of that year, thanks to the efforts of Păunescu and Dumitru Radu Popescu, the Romanian Writers' Union granted Kalustian an unofficial pension; his name later disappeared from the membership list. His wife died the following month, plunging him into grief; his apathy deepened after his brother died in 1985, and his desire to write steadily faded. A late contribution, praised by fellow author Gheorghe Tomozei for its "delicate ardor", was a review of the Romanian football team's performance at UEFA Euro 1984; another was his preface to a book of memoirs by the left-wing peasant activist Ion D. Isac, which was published by Editura Eminescu in 1987. It included Kalustian's personal recollection of electoral battles and anti-fascist alliances.

Bookseller Marius Nicolescu notes that, in the 1980s, Kalustian, like George Carabas and Radu Sterescu, was engaging in a semi-legal book trade: "Sometimes in defiance of the authorities and their laws, and sometimes with [their] indulgent complicity". At that stage, Florescu had come under surveillance for his participation in the black market in coffee and other goods; as he reports, the Securitate, which handled his interrogation, asked about his contacts with Kalustian and Carandino, whom it branded "enemies of the people". As a result, Florescu decided to end the "Artists' Club", and would only meet with his friends in Kalustian's apartment. During the 1984–1985 winter, the rooms were left unheated due to the Ceaușescu's austerity policies; unlike his friend and neighbor Alexandru Rosetti, Kalustian did not qualify for state assistance. In December, as Florescu faced arrest, Kalustian advised him to seek being beaten up in custody as the better alternative to a prison term. Arachelian recalls that, around 1987, all those who had read Carandino's samizdat, which included his clandestine memoirs, were briefly detained by the Bucharest Securitate, and threatened with prosecution.

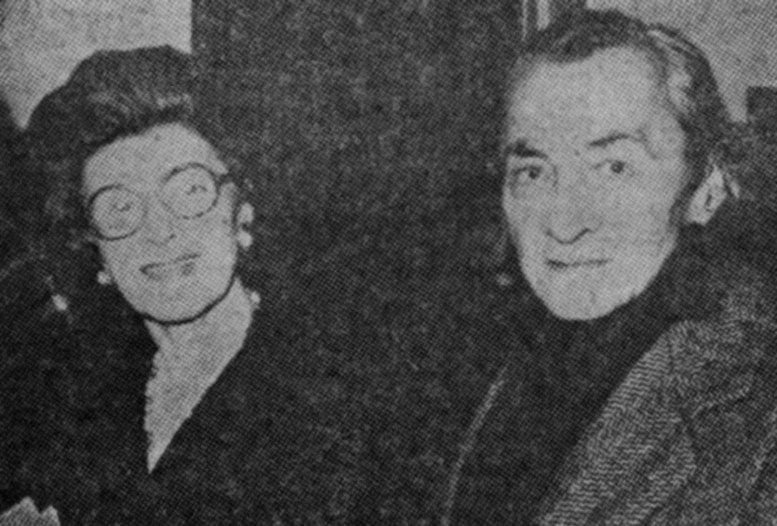
Elvira Godeanu and Kalustian receiving their Săptămîna awards, December 1988

During the final portion of the 1980s, the aging writer was socializing with Condurățeanu, to whom he confessed his dream of seeing Ceaușescu pilloried in Piața Romană. Condurățeanu also took him on daily visits to the Flacăra offices—so that Kalustian could still smell the print, claiming that he would die without this stimulus; Kalustian was also frequenting dining with actress Elvira Godeanu, but would embarrass her by falling asleep on her sofa. He was at Flacăra for the celebration of his 80th birthday in October 1988. As observed by his colleague Horia Pătrașcu, he still seemed "the youngest one in the room", despite visible signs of a medical condition. Daniela Mariano of Săptămîna, who was among the guests, notes that Kalustian structured his party as a lesson in journalism, impressing his juniors by reading out from a text he had contributed in 1930, and which still seemed fresh. In December, he and Godeanu visited Săptămîna's offices to receive awards for their respective lifetime achievements.

In October 1989, his health increasingly deteriorating, Kalustian returned to Focșani, where his two sisters cared for him until his death the following January. He was buried in the local Armenian cemetery, the service officiated by Zareh Baronian, who had reportedly assisted Kalustian during his final days. One month before his death, communism had been toppled in Romania. Pătrașcu believes that Kalustian was moved to tears by these events, which gave him a final grasp of personal freedom. Condurățeanu, who visited him to inform him of Ceaușescu's trial and execution, contrarily found him to be "enveloped in total indifference."

== Legacy ==
An obituary was penned by Paul Lăzărescu in the first post-revolutionary issue of Dreptatea, organ of the revived Christian Democratic National Peasants' Party. It celebrated Kalustian, a man of "unrelenting verve", for "never abdicat[ing], not for one moment, from the principles he espoused", and announced that he had been just been admitted into the Writers' Union. As Voinescu writes, his death had occurred just before Kalustian could have caught glimpse of post-revolutionary journalism, which had gone into terminal decline—a "second death". Arachelian, who published his own Simple note column in Datina magazine, credits Kalustian as the main source of information for his interwar-themed novel—the 1999 Noaptea bastarzilor. As he notes, that writing, along with the complementary novel Cartea regelui romantic și a fiilor fără de țară, is all that endures from the Kalustian–Arachelian conversations, in which the latter was tying to persuade the former into dictating a "subjective history" of Carol's reign.

Kalustian's own Facsimile was republished, in 2000, by Editura Ararat. His memory was invoked by his former friends and colleagues. His centennial in October 2008 was celebrated by Focșani officials, including Angel Tîlvăr, and the Union of Armenians of Romania, with the participation of Arachelian, Baronian, and Varujan Pambuccian; Ionuț Ladea completed a bust of Kalustian, but not in time to be unveiled for that ceremony. In 2013, Traian Dobrinescu made Kalustian, Carandino and Coposu characters in his novel, Cei morți înainte de moarte ("Men Who Died before Dying"). In January 2015, during ceremonies marking 25 years since Kalustian's death, a Kalustian Documentary Fund was established at Vrancea County Library.
