= Baronian =

Baronian (in Eastern Armenian Պարոնյան) or in Western Armenian Պարոնեան) is an Armenian surname that means "son of a Baron". It is thought to have originated in the Cilician Kingdom, when the Western term Baron, a title of nobility, came to replace its Armenian counterpart Nakharar. However, since the actual title of Baron was not always hereditary, descendants of Barons were designated with the surname Baronian to indicate the nobility of their ancestor. Eventually, the usage of the word Baron in Armenian evolved and is currently used in the same way as Mister is used in modern English. For example, a man whose last name is Baronian may be referred to as Baron Baronian in modern times, though his last name still implies that a remote ancestor likely held the Baron title of nobility. Baronian can be also written as Paronyan, particularly in Eastern Armenian.

Baronian / Paronyan may refer to:

- Hagop Baronian (pronounced in Eastern Armenian as Hakop Paronyan) (1843–1891), influential Ottoman Armenian writer, satirist, educator, and social figure in the 19th century
  - Paronyan Musical Comedy Theatre of Yerevan, Yerevan State Musical Comedy Theatre, main theatre named after Baronian above
- Jean-Baptiste Baronian, also known as Alexandre Lous (born 1942), French-language Belgian writer of Armenian descent, critic, essayist, children's book writer and novelist
- Zareh Baronian (1941–2017), Romania-born Armenian theologian, abbot, Archimandrite
