= Missir =

Missir is a surname used by three notable individuals of Armenian descent from Romania:

- Basile M. Missir (1843–1929), Romanian lawyer and politician
- Ioan Missir (1890–1945), Romanian lawyer, politician, and novelist
- Petru Th. Missir, Romanian literary critic, journalist, and jurist
