= Manoliu =

Manoliu is a Romanian surname. Notable people with the surname include:

- Gheorghe Manoliu (1888–1980), Romanian major general
- Lia Manoliu (1932–1998), Romanian discus thrower
- Petru Manoliu (1903–1976), Romanian novelist, essayist, and newspaper editor
