= Petru Manoliu =

Romanian novelist, essayist and newspaper editor

Petru Virgil Manoliu (Romanian pronunciation: [ˈpetru virˈd͡ʒil manoˈli.u]; January 28, 1903 – January 29, 1976) was a Romanian novelist, essayist, and newspaper editor. Shaped by philosophical readings, marked by a sense of anxiety and the influence of André Gide, much of his early literary work falls into the category of Trăirism. These traits are complemented by Manoliu's activities in cultural journalism, alternating between contributions to left-wing papers and support for the far-right and mystical philosophy of Nae Ionescu. By the time of World War II, he had also begun writing historical fiction and plays, penning anticommunist and anti-Soviet articles in the central newspapers.

Manoliu was persecuted and twice imprisoned by the communist regime in the 1950s, serving time on the building site of the Danube–Black Sea Canal. Banned from publishing upon his return, he focused instead on translation work, and achieved national recognition for his renditions from Thomas Mann. He nevertheless lived a secluded life, marked by poverty, and continued to write works which went unpublished, in particular diaries.

== Biography ==
=== Early life and debut ===
Born in Mihăileni, Botoșani County, his parents were the teacher Ion Manoliu and his wife Victoria (née Stavrat). After attending primary school in his native village, he went to high school in Botoșani and Iași. He later enrolled in the literature and philosophy faculty of the University of Bucharest, during which time he was hired by Petre P. Negulescu to work at the Romanian Academy Library. Manoliu had noted contributions in Bilete de Papagal (which he also edited, under director Tudor Arghezi), and, from 1930 to 1930, he was editor of the newspaper Curentul, and, in 1931, also put out Pământul magazine, based in Botoșani.

This was the beginning of a long career in the press, for which Manoliu sometimes used the pen names Erasm, Dr. Nicolai Flamel, Petru M., Pet. Man, and Arhiman. Around 1933, he was commissioned by Paul Zarifopol to translate Ortega y Gasset's Revolt of the Masses, published in Revista Fundațiilor Regale. His first standalone book was the 1935 novel Rabbi Haies Reful, followed in 1936 by Tezaur bolnav ("Sickly Treasure", 1936). He also published scattered poetry, generally inspired by the more depressing periods of his life, and evidencing strong influences from Mihai Eminescu.

Such works place him among the writers who regarded living as a mystical experience, a succession of revolutionary discontent, gratuitous gestures, and deep anguish—the "new generation" authors, or Trăirists. Animated by the idea of a role for his literary generation (based on this "new spirituality" of the 1930s), he formed part of a group of writers who sought to integrate Romanian culture into the wider European context, while giving it a specific national dimension: Mircea Eliade, Emil Cioran, Mihail Sebastian, Anton Holban, Constantin Noica, Mircea Vulcănescu, Nicolae Steinhardt, Petru Comarnescu, Petre Pandrea, and Edgar Papu. He carried out a prodigious correspondence with Cioran and Camil Petrescu, and also tried to engage Eliade in philosophical debates, acknowledging him as his intellectual superior.

=== Credința and Lumea Românească ===
Also a contributor to newspapers and magazines including România Literară, Cuvântul, and Discobolul, Manoliu is mainly known for his work in Sandu Tudor's Credința and Floarea de Foc, the spiritualized and left-leaning Orthodox periodicals. He was the former's editor in 1933–1938, being assigned his own column, Țintar ("Merels"). He was married to the sister of Ioan Missir, the Botoșani mayor and aspiring novelist, whose work he reviewed in Credința. Both Missirs were American-born and Armenian, related to the literary critic Petru Th. Missir.

During his stay there, Manoliu produced articles celebrating irrationalism and criticizing the old school of literary criticism. At Floarea de Foc, he attacked posthumously Titu Maiorescu, the skeptical conservative, claiming to show how Maiorescu had "lied to the world", and prophesying that he would be soon forgotten. Writing in 2002, philologist Elvira Sorohan commented: "[the article] was ridiculous, given who it was that wrote it." Like other "new generation" men, Manoliu was affiliated with Criterion club. He left during a public scandal, sparked when Credința attacked Criterion host Petru Comarnescu for his homosexuality, preferring to side with Tudor. He advised moderation as the former Criterion members drifted into far-right and far-left politics. In a 1934 article, he reflected all "foreign shirts", including the brown uniforms of Nazism and the red symbols of communism.

Around 1935, Manoliu also joined Zaharia Stancu's left-leaning paper, Azi, and, according to his own testimony, actually managed it to 1937. His apolitical stance was nonetheless touched by the Orthodoxist politics of Nae Ionescu, the far-right philosopher. By 1936, Manoliu's articles in Credința described Ionescu as a leader of men and a figure of mythical proportions. A year later, he defended Ionescu's political radicalism against accusations of phyletism, defining nation and nationalism as a "community of destiny". In 1945, looking back on the period, the essayist Eugène Ionesco described the "good-for-nothing" Manoliu as "made reactionary" and "imbecilic" by Ionescu.

Leaving Credința in 1938, Manoliu joined Stancu's Lumea Românească daily, serving as the latter's editor for one year. It was mainly an antifascist tribune, grouping together moderate left-wingers and writers affiliated with the underground Romanian Communist Party (Geo Bogza, George Macovescu, Stephan Roll). After a stint editing and writing for Petrescu's România (1939–1940), he spent the rest of World War II, to 1944, as editor of, and frequent contributor to, the daily Timpul. He also edited literary and political magazines such as Vremea, Discipolul, Convorbiri Literare, and Familia.

Manoliu returned to his work in fiction with Moartea nimănui ("Nobody's Death", 1939), a novel on moral degeneration, and Domnița Ralú Caragea (1939), a historical retelling of Rallou Karatza's activities. In 1940, he wrote a six-act historical play, Io, Ștefan Voievod. Featuring Stephen III of Moldavia as its central character, the work was only published in 2006. Ultimately graduating university in 1940, he joined the Romanian Writers' Society the following year.

=== World War II and communism ===
Following the start of Operation Barbarossa of 1941, in which Romania participated as a Nazi ally, Manoliu penned articles blaming the Soviets for the Katyn massacre, for which the perpetrators long denied responsibility. In 1943, he rejoined Tudor, Noica, Anton Dumitriu and others on a pilgrimage to Cernăuți, where they debated the topic of Orthodox spirituality. He also wrote Creangă (1944), a monograph on the life of writer Ion Creangă meant for popular consumption.

In 1945, the new communist-dominated government of Petru Groza banned Manoliu from publishing for a period of five years, accusing him of having written "articles with an anti-democratic character". In particular, what offended the authorities was his Katyn denunciation. Under the subsequent communist regime, Manoliu was forced into destitution, and retrained to work as a dental technician. He was eventually arrested, in circumstances that he himself failed to clarify, and then sent into internal exile at Costișa in Neamț County, but re-imprisoned after being caught reading (in 1958) a philosophical work by the self-exiled Cioran. Among the sites at which he was detained was Capul Midia, a forced labor camp that was part of the Danube–Black Sea Canal. He was part of a work team that also included fellow writer Barbu Brezianu (with whom he remained close friends), Oni Brătianu, and Bani Ghica. At Costișa, he wrote diaries, essays and play, most of them still unpublished. He lived in poverty, and was nicknamed Arlechinul ("The Harlequin") for the patches on his clothes.

As he remained barred from publishing fiction, Manoliu turned to translation, winning acclaim in this field. Reportedly, he was still snubbed by Stancu, by then the Romanian Writers' Union, but won his first contract with Thomas Mann's The Magic Mountain, taking over for Eugen Barbu. In 1967, it won him the Romanian Writers' Union. He completed a single-handed translation of Joseph and His Brothers, which ran at 1,220 pages. Other authors whom he rendered into Romanian include Jacques Bainville, Adelbert von Chamisso, Pierre Corneille, Ferenc Körmendi, D. H. Lawrence, Johannes Linnankoski, Jack London, and Jean Racine. He was steeped in philosophy, commenting on the works of Friedrich Nietzsche, Martin Heidegger and others. He spent his last three years at Mogoșoaia and, traumatized by his wife's suicide, cut himself off from his family.

== Novels and diaries ==
Manoliu alternated between essays and novels, the latter a blend of fiction with metaphysically-oriented essays. As noted by literary historian George Călinescu, his debut with the Jewish-themed Rabbi Haies Reful, taking place in a Moldavian market town at the dawn of the 20th century, is "confusing and lyrical". According to critic Nicolae Florescu, in this work and some of the later ones, Manoliu presents an epic fresco which confronts the tolerance of Romanians to the intolerance of foreigners and minorities.

Tezaur bolnav is inspired by André Gide, and focuses of the "Gidean" intellectual youth. As noted by critic Ovid Crohmălniceanu, its protagonists "always seem inclined to ask themselves questions as to the purpose of existence." Florescu sees Manoliu himself as possessed by a wish to declare his innermost thoughts and sentiments, a "sincerity that borders on the ridiculous". In Moartea nimănui, Manoliu's style is heavily indebted to Gide, but mainly recalls the proletarian literature of George Mihail Zamfirescu and Carol Ardeleanu. Set in the sugar mill of Chitila and in homeless shelters, it shows young intellectuals driven to destitution and despair, and introduces Mortaru, a homosexual character. According to Călinescu, its experimental nature "alienates the reader." This reading is supported by Crohmălniceanu, who notes: "The speculative torment is not without drama, but is greatly harmed by the lyricism of the exposition, which is all too impersonal."

Political repression pushed Manoliu away from his work as a novelist, but allowed him to carry on as a diarist. As noted by Florescu in 2008, his 1970s Jurnal de peregrin ("Pilgrim's Diary") "provides one of the most dramatic images of the aging intellectual, taken with the notion of failure and the awareness of his demise", a "despairing monologue, with no possibility of evading into the much richer past." Also according to Florescu, these last work mark Manoliu's return to his early idols, Ortega y Gasset and Mihai Eminescu.
