= Armenia–Romania relations =

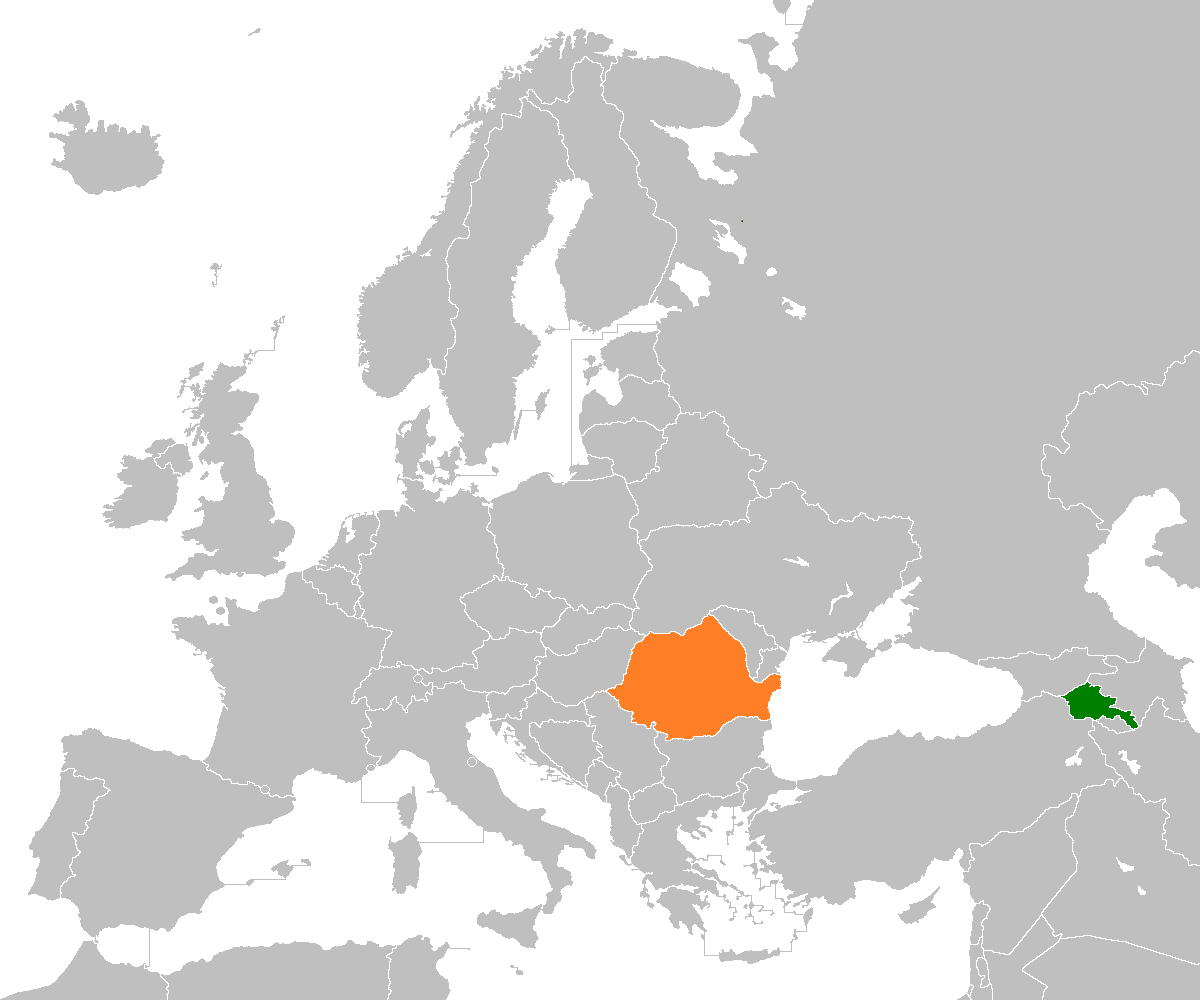

- Armenia: Romania

Armenia–Romania relations refer to the bilateral relations between Armenia and Romania. Both countries established diplomatic relations on 17 December 1991. Armenia has an embassy in Bucharest and Romania has an embassy in Yerevan. Both countries are members of the Organization of the Black Sea Economic Cooperation, the European Political Community, and the Council of Europe.

There are around 3,000 people of Armenian descent living in Romania. Modern relationships between Armenia and Romania are rooted in part in the modern history of the Armenian people. After the Armenian genocide of 1915, Romania was the first state to officially provide shelter and refugee camps to refugees from the area. In October 2007, the President of Armenia, Serzh Sargsyan, received a delegation headed by the Romanian Minister of National Defense, Teodor Meleșcanu, and noted that the Armenian-Romanian friendship was deeply rooted in history. He also noted that it was not by accident that Romania was the first country to formally recognize the independence of Armenia from the USSR.

== Armenian genocide recognition ==
Regarding Romania, in 2006, the President Traian Băsescu was asked if Romania would follow France and other Western states in recognizing the genocide. He then declared "we will not do anything affecting our neutrality in our relations with all the countries of the Black Sea region" and said Romania did not want to risk worsening relations with Turkey. Băsescu said Armenia was complicating Turkey's integration into the European Union by continuously raising the issue in the international community. However, over the next several years, pressure for Romania to recognize the event grew. In 2016, Cătălin Avramescu, advisor to the then ex-president Băsescu, said "Romania has special duty to recognize Armenian Genocide"; while the Romanian-Armenian politician Varujan Vosganian, who is president of the Union of Armenians of Romania, called on the Romanian Parliament in 2019 to do the same. In one poll, it was found that 72% of the Romanians surveyed were aware of the Armenian genocide.

== Diplomacy ==
Armenia

- Bucharest (Embassy)

Romania

- Yerevan (Embassy)

== See also ==
- Foreign relations of Armenia
- Foreign relations of Romania
- Armenians of Romania
- Armenia-NATO relations
- Armenia-EU relations
  - Accession of Armenia to the EU
