= Union of Armenians of Romania =

Union of Armenians of Romania Uniunea Armenilor din România Ռումինիայի Հայոց Միություն
- President: Varujan Vosganian
- Founded: 11 March 1990
- Headquarters: Bd. Carol I, Nr. 43, Sector 2, Bucharest
- Ideology: Armenian minority interests
- National affiliation: National Minorities Parliamentary Group
- Chamber of Deputies: 1 / 330
- Senate: 0 / 136
- European Parliament: 0 / 32

Website
- www.uniuneaarmenilor.ro

The Union of Armenians of Romania (Romanian: Uniunea Armenilor din România, UAR; Armenian: Ռումինիայի Հայոց Միություն, romanized: Ṙuminiayi Hayeri Miutʿyun, RHM) is an ethnic minority political party in Romania representing the Armenian community.

== History ==
The UAR contested the 1990 general elections, and despite receiving only 399 votes (0.003%), it won a single seat in the Chamber of Deputies under the electoral law that allows for political parties representing ethnic minority groups to be exempt from the electoral threshold. It has won a seat in every election since.

== Election results ==
Election	Chamber of Deputies			Senate		
Election	Votes	%	Seats	Votes	%	Seats
1990	399	0.00	1	–	–	–
1992	7,145	0.07	1			
1996	11,543	0.09	1	–	–	–
2000	21,302	0.20	1	–	–	–
2004	9,810	0.10	1			
2008	13,829	0.20	1	–	–	–
2012	10,761	0.15	1	–	–	–
2016	4,868	0.07	1	–	–	–

== See also ==
- Armenia–Romania relations
- Armenians of Romania
