= Ioan Missir =

Romanian politician

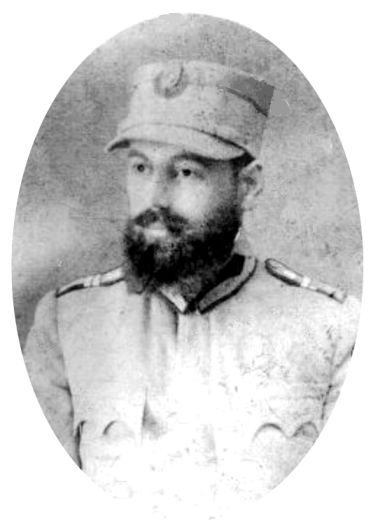
- Missir in army uniform

Mayor of Botoșani
- In office 1931–1932
- In office 1941–1944

Personal details
- Born: February 17, 1890 West Hoboken, New Jersey, United States
- Died: November 30, 1945 (aged 55) Botoșani, Kingdom of Romania
- Party: Democratic Nationalist Party
- Education: University of Bucharest
- Occupation: Lawyer, politician, novelist
- Known for: World War I memoirs, being the last mayor of Botoșani before the Soviet occupation of Romania

Military service
- Allegiance: Kingdom of Romania
- Branch/service: Romanian Land Forces
- Years of service: 1916–1918
- Rank: Captain
- Unit: 8th Light Infantry Regiment
- Battles/wars: World War I; Romanian campaign

Ioan Missir (February 17, 1890 – November 30, 1945) was a Romanian lawyer, politician and novelist. Born in the United States, he was raised in his father's native country from early childhood. There, he took part in World War I as an officer, worked as a lawyer and rose in local politics to become mayor. Missir's wartime experience informed his only novel, the 1937 Fata Moartă, which proved a resounding critical and commercial success.

== Biography ==
His father Bogdan came from a well-known Armenian family that included Petru Th. Missir. He married the Swiss schoolteacher Cécile Marchand, a native of Fribourg, and emigrated to the United States. Settling in Hudson County, New Jersey, he became a farmer; Ioan was the second of four children and was born in what was then West Hoboken, New Jersey (now part of Union City). The family business was only a moderate success; probably coupled with nostalgia, they returned home to Botoșani in 1894.

From 1897, Ioan Missir attended primary school there, followed by A. T. Laurian High School, from which he graduated in 1909. He subsequently enrolled in the law faculty of the University of Bucharest, completing it in 1913. For a time, he was secretary to his uncle Basile M. Missir, a prominent lawyer and politician. Disliking the role of lackey and perhaps bewildered by life in the capital city, he returned to the provincial Botoșani. (Missir had an abiding love for the town and the entire north of Moldavia; like his father, he enjoyed spending his free hours working the nearby vineyard they had inherited from a princely official.) He joined the local bar association but did not have very much time to practice law, as World War I was soon underway.

He volunteered and he was assigned with the rank of second lieutenant to the local light infantry (vânători) regiment. Sent to the Carpathian front, he took part in all the campaigns of 1916–1917. He eventually rose to the rank of captain, serving until his unit was demobilized after the Treaty of Bucharest.

After the war, he resumed the practice of law, also entering politics in the factions led by fellow townsman Nicolae Iorga. He was deputy mayor in 1919–1920 and mayor in 1931–1932 as well as in 1941–1944. In 1940, prior to the area's Soviet occupation, Missir was commander of the Cernăuți rail station. As mayor, he was the last to leave the evacuated Botoșani in March 1944, during the Uman–Botoșani Offensive. He died the following year, prematurely.

== Fata Moartă ==
Until the mid-1930s, there was no indication of Missir's interest in cultural life, except his apparent support for Crai nou magazine. Thus, his only published novel, Fata Moartă, appeared in early summer 1937 as a complete surprise. The previous autumn, he had given the manuscript to his brother-in-law Petru Manoliu; the author did not expect to be published, but did allow Manoliu to approach an editor. In a later interview, Missir noted that he began the book as a protest against those who objected to providing discounts on the Căile Ferate Române railway for decorated war veterans. In a sense, the novel is also a reply to Erich Maria Remarque's All Quiet on the Western Front. He started by writing the preface before composing the novel itself, working from a sketched outline and his prodigious memory. He also benefited from what Vladimir Streinu termed a "literary instinct": the action is set amidst the events it details, mainly in the present tense, and moves with great speed. The battle scenes follow in a quick succession of short phrases enriched by an eye for detail that is unsparing of the narrator, of his comrades and of the reader in its honesty. The protagonist, an officer, is given to frequent introspection; the book conveys the fear, the incompetence of the commanders and of those behind the front, the progressive degradation of spirit. The tension is punctured by devices such as jokes, scenes of de-lousing and amusing characters. Finally, a civilian perspective comes from letters sent by the protagonist's mother, and there is a closing episode dedicated to his devoted aide. The title ("The Dead Girl") refers to a contested plateau.

Fata Moartă was prefaced by Iorga and drew praise from important literary critics. It was awarded two coveted prizes: that of the Romanian Academy (for the 1937–1938 session) and that of the Romanian Writers' Society (for 1938), which granted him membership via a special exemption. The book went through five editions in the first eight years. Another one appeared in 1967, the passages on Bolsheviks and their deleterious actions cut by the censors of the communist regime. It was republished in 1977, and emerged in a complete version in 2006. It is seen as one of a handful of enduring Romanian novels of World War I. Although Missir published no other novels, he did write a manuscript about the Soviet occupation of Bessarabia and Northern Bukovina; this appears lost. Following the Romanian Revolution, his daughter donated a book of memoirs to the Museum of Romanian Literature.
