= Jean-Baptiste Baronian =

Belgian novelist (born 1942)

Jean-Baptiste Baronian born as Joseph Lous Baronian also known as Alexandre Lous (born 29 April 1942) is a French-language Belgian writer of Armenian descent. He was born in Antwerp, Belgium. Baronian is a critic, essayist, children's book writer and novelist.
