= Zareh Baronian =

Armenian theologian and abbot

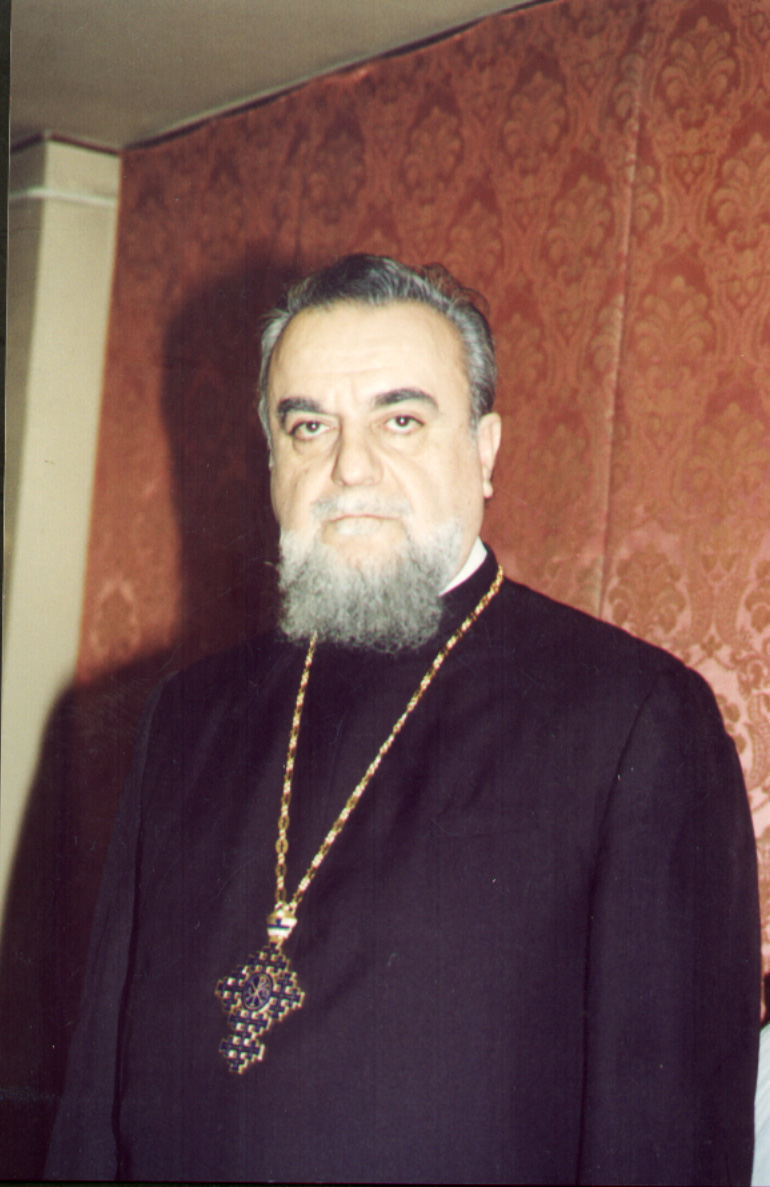
Zareh Baronian

Archimandrite Zareh Baronian (October 2, 1941 in Bucharest, Romania – April 13, 2017) was an Armenian-Romanian theologian and abbot.

== Biography ==
Zareh Baronian was born on October 2, 1941, in Bucharest, in a family of intellectuals, and was baptized Hagop. His father, the poet Zareh Bâlbul (literary pseudonym), was a teacher at the Armenian School in Bucharest, and his mother, Haiguhi, was a teacher of Armenian and German at primary school. His grandfather after his mother, Nerses Keropian, was a protopope of the Armenian Church in Bucharest, and both his maternal and paternal uncles were also priests.

After graduating from the Armenian Elementary School in Bucharest, with the support of the Ministry of Education and at the request of the school's directorate, he attended the Pedagogical High School in Yerevan(Armenia) from 1955, after which he worked as a teacher at the Armenian School in Bucharest from 1959 to 1961.
