= Petru Th. Missir =

Romanian literary critic, journalist and jurist

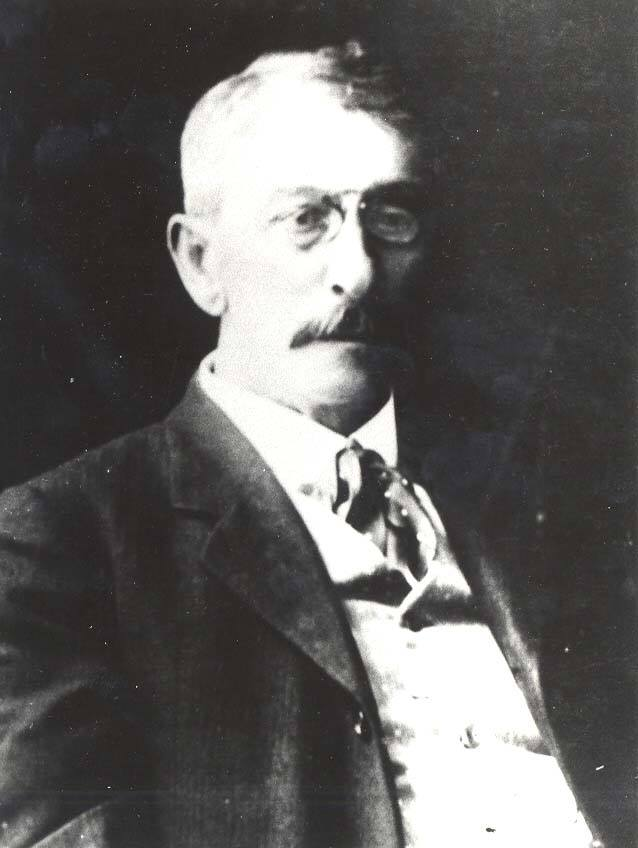
Petru Th. Missir

Petru Th. Missir (October 8, 1856 – June 10, 1929) was a Romanian literary critic, journalist and jurist.

Born in Roman, Principality of Moldavia, into a family of ethnic Armenian merchants, he graduated from Iași's National College in 1873. While a student at the University of Vienna's law faculty, he entered and became secretary of the România jună society. He later studied law at Berlin University, where he earned a doctorate in 1879. A member of Junimea, he also served as the organization's attorney; he was both a lifelong friend to Ion Luca Caragiale and close to Titu Maiorescu and Petre P. Carp. After working as a magistrate in Iași from 1880 to 1884, he taught both natural and international law at Iași University starting in 1884. From 1890, Missir was a professor at the University of Bucharest, and attended the Hague Conference on Private International Law in 1893. He was among the Junimea members who raised funds in defense of Mihai Eminescu. He edited the weekly Era nouă (1889-1900) and was part of the editing committee of Revista română (1902). In 1891, Era nouă became associated with the Constitutional Party, a Carp-led Junimist dissident faction of the Conservative Party, which it rejoined in 1900. In 1912, he was vice president of the Romanian Senate. The following year, he entered Take Ionescu's Conservative-Democratic Party. He was elected an honorary member of the Romanian Academy in 1926.
