= Varujan Vosganian =

Romanian politician, economist, essayist and poet

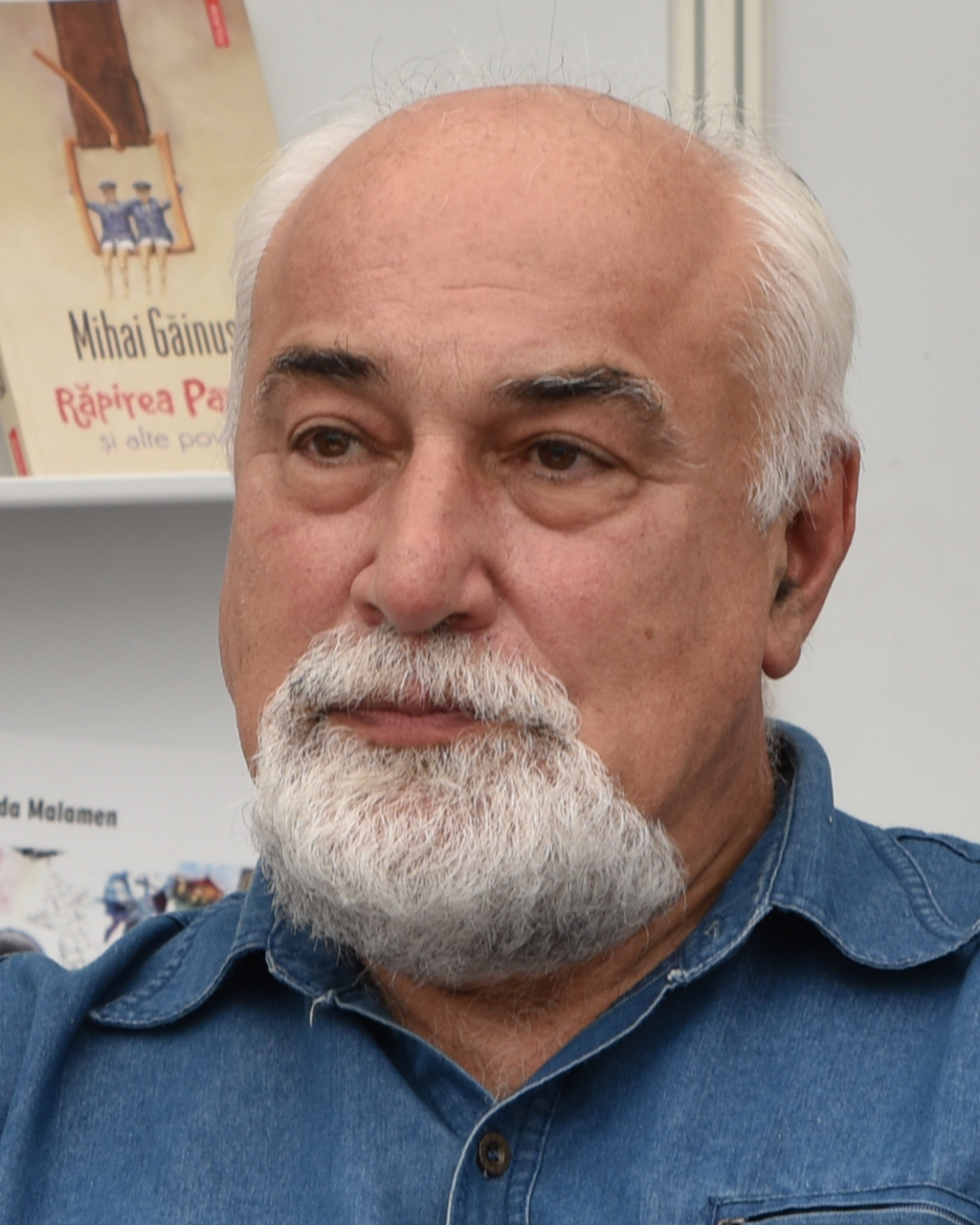

Minister of Economy and Finance
- In office 4 April 2007 – 22 December 2008
- Prime Minister: Călin Popescu-Tăriceanu
- Preceded by: Himself (Economy and Finance)
- Succeeded by: Adriean Videanu (Economy); Gheorghe Pogea (Finance)

Minister of Economy and Commerce
- In office December 2006 – 4 April 2007
- Prime Minister: Călin Popescu-Tăriceanu
- Preceded by: Codruţ Şereş
- Succeeded by: Himself (Economy and Finance)

Minister of Economy
- In office December 2012 – October 2013

Personal details
- Born: 25 July 1958 (age 68) Craiova, Romania
- Party: The Union of Armenians in Romania (Deputy during 1990–1996); Union of Right Forces (1996–2003, Senator during 1996–2000); National Liberal Party (2003–2015, Senator during 2004–2016); Alliance of Liberals and Democrats (Deputy during 2016–2020)
- Spouse: Mihaela Vosganian
- Children: Armine
- Education: Bucharest University of Economic Studies; University of Bucharest
- Awards: Movses Khorenatsi Medal
- Website: www.vosganian.ro

Varujan Vosganian (Romanian pronunciation: [varuˈʒan vosɡaˈnjan]; Armenian: Վարուժան Ոսկանեան, born on 25 July 1958) is a Romanian politician, economist, essayist and poet of Armenian origin. Vosganian was Romania's Minister of Economy and Commerce (2006–2008) in the Tăriceanu cabinet and Minister of Economy in the Ponta cabinet (2012–2013). He is the President of The Union of Armenians in Romania (UAR, 1990–present) and the Prime-vice president of the Union of Writers in Romania (2005–present). His books have been translated into more than 20 languages.

== Biography ==
Varujan Vosganian was born in Craiova to a family of Armenian ethnicity. His grandparents were survivors of the genocide against Armenian people which took place in the Ottoman Empire in 1915. Vosganian studied at the Alexandru Ioan Cuza High School in Focșani. He then studied Commerce at the Bucharest Academy of Economic Studies (graduated 1982) and Mathematics at the University of Bucharest (graduated 1991), gaining a Ph.D. in economics in 1998.

After participating in the Romanian Revolution in 1989, he has been a member of the Romanian Parliament since the first free elections in 1990. In 1990, he became president of The Union of Armenians in Romania and he was twice (1990–1992 and 1992–1996) elected a member of the Chamber of Deputies, and a Senator (1996–2000, on the lists of the Union of Right Forces, and 2004–2016, on the lists of the National Liberal Party). Between 1996 and 2003, he was the leader of the Union of Right Forces (Uniunea Forţelor de Dreapta), a right wing liberal party, which eventually merged into the National Liberal Party (PNL) in 2003. Having served as minister for Economy and Finance between 2006 and 2008, Vosganian was minister of commerce from 2012 to 2013.

Since 2016, he has been a member of the Chamber of Deputies on the lists of the Alliance of Liberals and Democrats for Europe (ALDE).

Along with non-fiction works on economics, Vosganian has also published many essays and literary texts, such as a volume of poems, short stories and novels. The international recognition came with The Book of Whispers (2009), translated in more than twenty languages. Presented in different events (public lectures, essays, workshops, screenings and dramatisations) in more than forty countries from all the continents, The Book of Whispers became the book-symbol against the crime of genocide.

Vosganian speaks Armenian, Romanian, English, French, Italian, and Spanish.

== Prizes and awards ==
Literary prizes and awards

- Prize of the Association of Writers in Bucharest for the best prose of the year – 1994
- Great Prize for Poetry Nichita Stănescu (Chișinău, Republic of Moldavia) – 2006
- Prize for the best book of the year, awarded by the Romania Literară literary magazine (2009)
- Prize for the best prose of the year, awarded by Convorbiri Literare literary magazine (2009)
- Prize for the best prose of the year, awarded by the Romanian Academy, 2009
- Prize for the best prose of the year and the Prize of readers, awarded by Observatorul Cultural Magazine (2010)
- Prize for the best prose of the year, awarded by Viața Românească Literary Magazine – 2010
- Prize for the best prose of the year awarded by Argeș literary magazine (2010)
- Nomination for the best prose of the year – Union of Writers in Romania (2009,2013)
- Niram Art Prize for poetry Tristan Tzara and for prose Mihail Sebastian, awarded by Niram Art Foundation, Madrid, 2010
- Nomination for the best translation of the year, Leipzig Bookfair, 2014
- The Angelus Award, The Prize of the Readers Natalia Gorbanevskaia and The Prize for the best translation of the year, Wrocław, 2016

Other Awards:

- Doctor Honoris Causa, awarded by Vasile Goldis University of Arad, 2006
- Romanian Academy Award for the contribution to the development of Romanian science and culture, 2006
- Gold Medal for Culture, awarded by the Government of Armenia, 2006, 2013
- Order "Nerses Shnorhali" awarded by the Catholicos of the Armenian Apostolic Church, 2006
- "Ordine della Solidarieta Italiana" awarded by President Giorgio Napolitano of Republic of Italy, 2008
- Order "Cilician Knight" awarded by the Great House of Cilicia Catholicosate, 2008
- "St. Andrew's Cross", awarded by the Romanian Patriarchate, 2008
- Medal "Movses Khorenatzi" awarded by President Serge Sarksian of Republic of Armenia, 2011
- Medal "William Saroyan" awarded by the Government of Armenia, 2012

== Publications ==
=== Economics ===
- Jurnalul de front: articole economice, Bucharest, Staff, 1994;
- Contradicțiile tranziției la o economie de piață, Bucharest, Expert, 1994;
- Reforma piețelor financiare din România, Iași, Polirom, 1999.

=== Literature ===
- Copiii războiului (The Children of War), novel, Polirom, 2016
- Cartea poemelor mele nescrise (The Book of my Unwritten Poems), poems, Cartea Românească, 2015 – around 2500 books sold
- Jocul celor o sută de frunze și alte povestiri (The Game of Hundred Leaves and Other Stories), stories, Polirom, 2013 – around 3500 copies sold
- Cartea șoaptelor (The Book of Whispers), novel, Polirom, Iasi, 2009, 2012 – more than 60.000 copies sold
- Iisus cu o mie de brațe (Jesus with a Thousand Arms), poems, Dacia, 2005
- Ochiul cel alb al reginei (The White Eye of the Queen), poems, bilingual (Romanian – English) Cartea Romaneasca, 2001
- Statuia Comandorului (The Statue of Commander), stories, Ararat, 1994
- Șamanul Albastru (The Blue Shaman) volume of poems, Ararat, 1994

Translations:

- A kék sámán (Șamanul Albastru), AB – ART (2009), poems, Hungarian translation
- El libro de los susurros (Cartea șoaptelor), Pre – Textos (2010), Spanish translation by Joaquin Garrigos
- Il libro dei sussurri (Cartea șoaptelor), Kellerdi Rovereto Trento (2011), Italian translation by Anita Natascia Bernacchia
- Șșukneri Matian (Cartea șoaptelor), Writers' Union of Armenia (2012), Antares (2014, second edition), Armenian translation by Sergiu Selian
- Sefer Halehishot (Cartea șoaptelor), Hakibbutz Hameuchad (2012), Hebrew translation by Any Shilon
- Le livre des chuchotements (Cartea șoaptelor), Editions des Syrtes (2013), French translation by Laure Hinckel și Marily Le Nir
- Viskningarnas bok (Cartea șoaptelor), 2244 (2013), Swedish translation by Inger Johansson
- Buch des Flüsterns (Cartea șoaptelor), Zsolnay Verlag (2013), Büchergilde Gutemberg (2015), German translation by Ernest Wichner
- Proșepnata kniga (Cartea șoaptelor), Avangard Print (2013), Bulgarian translation by Vanina Bojikova
- Suttogások könyve (Cartea șoaptelor), Orpheusz (2014), Hungarian translation by Zsolt Karácsony
- Livro dos Sussuros (Cartea șoaptelor), Digital edition (2015), Portuguese translation by Ernest Wichner
- Pecipeci name (Cartea șoaptelor), Ketabe Miamak (2015), Persan translation by Garoon Sarkisean
- Księga szeptów (Cartea șoaptelor), Książkowe Klimaty (2015), Polish translation by Joanna Kornaś-Warwas
- Het Boek der Fluisteringen (Cartea șoaptelor), Uitgeverij Pegasus (2015), Dutch translation Jan Willem Bos
- Kniha šepotů (Cartea șoaptelor), Havran (2016), Czech translation by Jarmila Horakova
- Igra na sto lista i drugi razkazi (Jocul celor o sută de frunze și alte povestiri), SONM (2016), Bulgarian translation by Vanina Bojikova
- Das Spiel der hundert Blätter (Jocul celor o sută de frunze și alte povestiri), Zsolnay Verlag (2016), German translation by Ernest Wichner
- Hviskingenes bok (Cartea șoaptelor), Bokvennen (2017), Norwegian translation by Steinar Lone
- Knjiga šapata (Cartea șoaptelor), Sandorf (2017), Croatian translation by Ana Brnardic Oproiu and Adrian Oproiu
- The Book of Whispers (Cartea șoaptelor), Yale University Press (2017), English translation by Alistair Ian Blyth

To be published in 2017–2018:

- Laguna Publishing House, Serbian translation of The Book of Whispers
- V.Books – XXI, Ukrainian Translation of The Book of Whispers

The Book of Whispers

Vosganian said during one of his interviews: "The book was written between 2003 and 2008. I do not know when I got the idea to write it, maybe I always had this thought. The Book of Whispers is, at the same time, autobiography, fiction and historical document. The characters and the events recounted are true. What I have added is the power of symbols. I used both the memory of my family and testimonies of survivors or historical documents. The book presents the biography of the twentieth century; The Armenian Genocide; The Communism in Eastern Europe; How to surpass a common trauma; How to choose between oblivion, revenge and forgiveness (the fundamental option of the human condition: to forgive – to revenge – to forget)."

== Other ==
- Founding member of the Romanian Society of Economy (SOREC)
- Member of the Board of International Experts of the Centre for European Policy Studies based in Brussels (1992–1995)
- Honorary member of the Scientific Council of the National Institute of Economic Foresight
- Senior Researcher of the National Institute of Economics in Romania
- Honorary Member of The Romanian Chamber of Commerce
