= Armenians in Romania =

Ethnic group in Romania

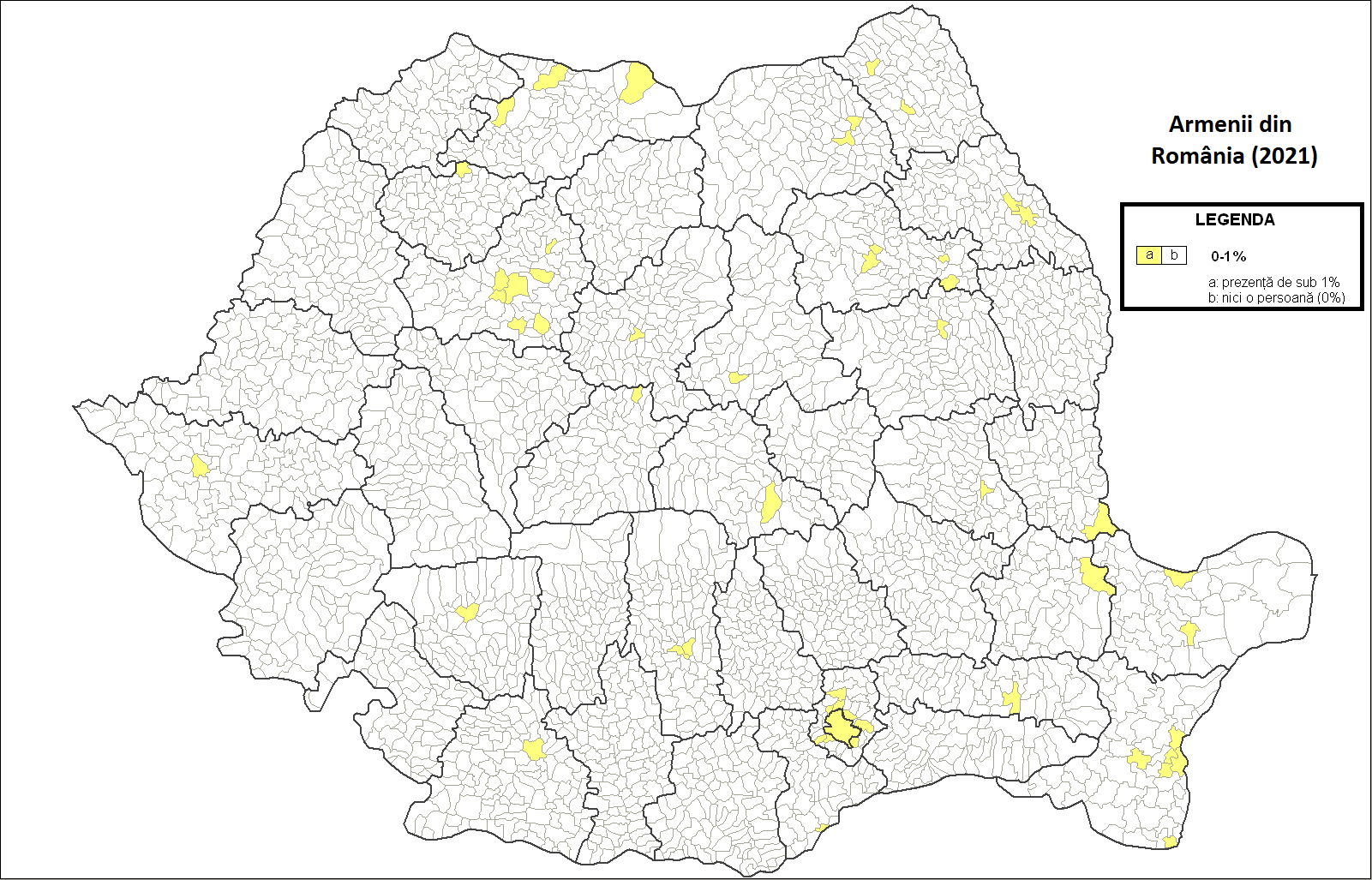

Total population
- 1,361 (2011 census); 10,000 (estimate)

Regions with significant populations
- Transylvania, Wallachia

Languages
- Armenian (Western Dialect), Romanian

Religion
- Armenian Orthodox Church, Armenian Catholic Church

Related ethnic groups
- Armenian diaspora

Armenians have been present in what are now the states of Romania and Moldova for over a millennium, and have been an important presence as traders since the 14th century. Numbering only in the thousands in modern times, they were culturally suppressed in the Communist era, but have undergone a cultural revival since the Romanian Revolution of 1989.

== History ==
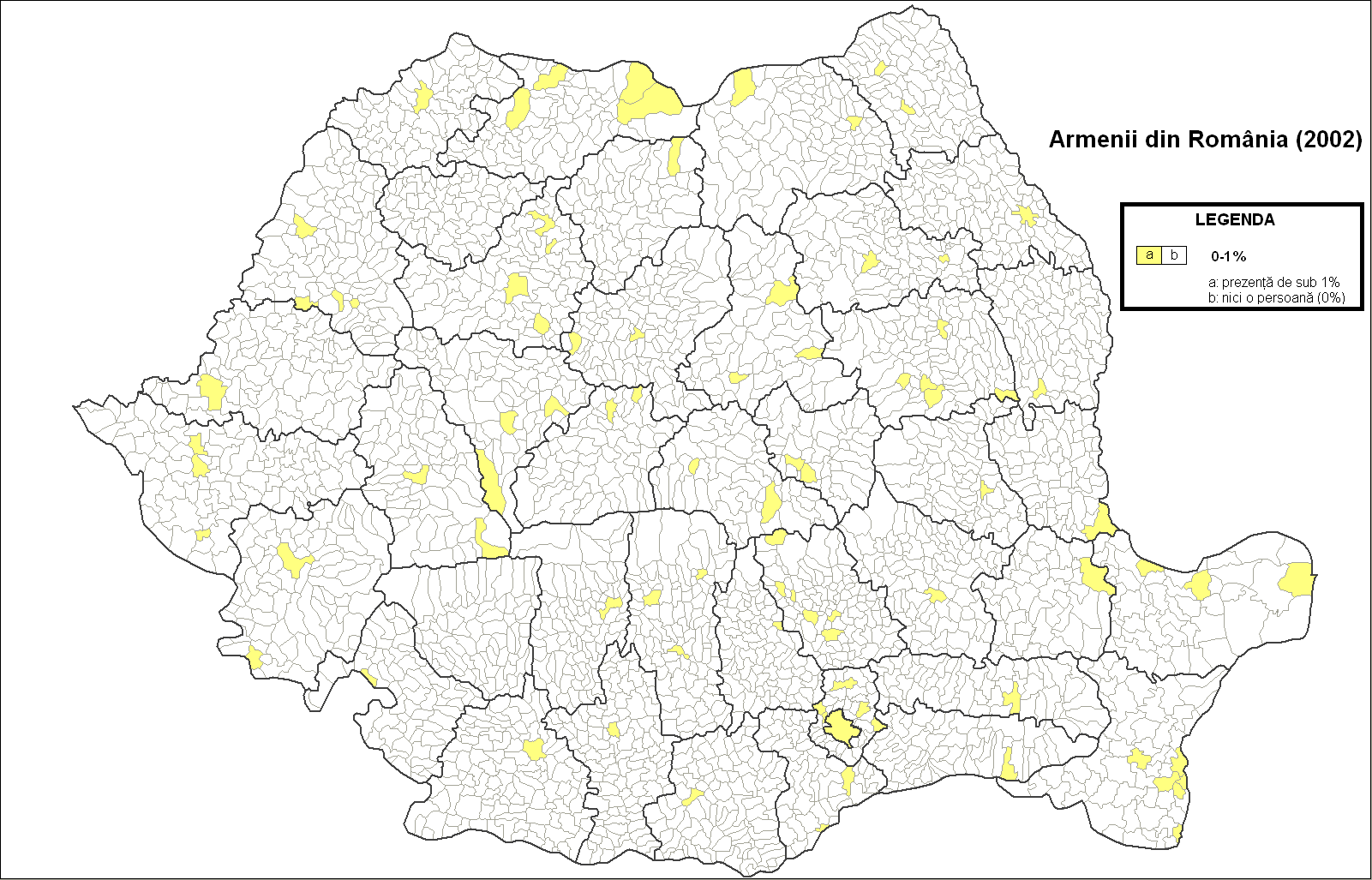
The distribution of Armenians in Romania (2002 census)

=== Danubian Principalities ===
The earliest traces of Armenians in what was later Moldavia are dated by 967 (recorded presence in Cetatea Albă). Early Armenian Diasporas stemmed in the fall of the Bagratuni rule (c. 885–1045) and other disasters, including the 13th-century Mongol invasion.

Armenian expatriates were awarded tax exemptions at different times in the Danubian Principalities' history. Encouraged to settle as early as the 14th century, they became a familiar presence in towns, usually as the main entrepreneurs of the community – for this, in early modern Botoșani and several other places, Armenians as a guild were awarded political representation and degrees of self-rule. A considerable number of noble families in the Principalities were of Armenian descent. In 1572–1574, John III the Terrible, grandson of Stephen the Great and son of Bogdan III and his Armenian concubine Serpega, was Hospodar (Prince) of Moldavia.

In Bucharest, an Armenian presence was first recorded in the second half of the 14th century – most likely, immigrants from the Ottoman-ruled Balkans, as well as from the area around Kamianets-Podilskyi and towns in Moldavia; throughout the 19th century, a large part of Armenian Bucharesters had arrived from Rousse, in present-day Bulgaria. The Gregorian Armenians were given the right to build a church around 1638 – it was rebuilt and expanded in 1685, but was damaged by the Russian attack during the 1768–1774 war with the Ottomans.

Citizenship was bestowed on the community only with the decision taken by the international protectorate over the two countries (instituted after the Crimean War and the ensuing 1856 Treaty of Paris) to extend civil rights to all religious minorities.

=== Transylvania ===
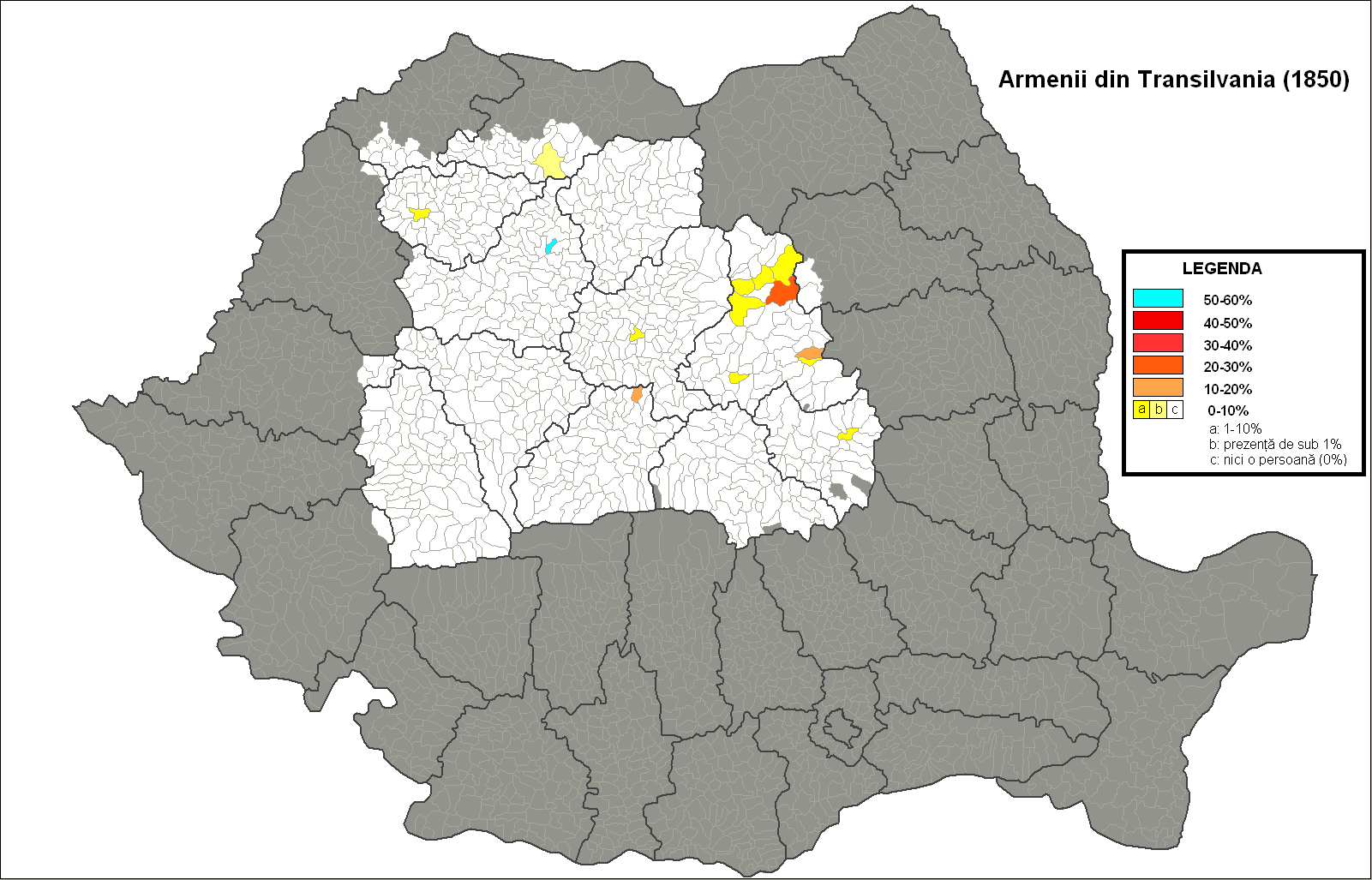
Armenians of Transylvania (1850)

Armenians were present from early on in Transylvania, clearly attested in a document issued by Hungarian King Ladislaus IV the Cuman (late 13th century). Here, they were even allowed to found their own trading towns, the most notable one being Gherla, called Armenopolis/Armenierstadt or Hayakaghak (Հայաքաղաք). The second important Armenian town in Transylvania is Dumbrăveni (Elisabethstadt).

Despite their increasing autonomy, the townspeople's adherence to the Roman Catholic Church was nonetheless demanded (a conversion begun through the efforts of a Botoșani-born prelate, Oxendius Vărzărescu, 1655–1715), and further submitted to forced integration by the Habsburg monarchy since the 18th century. The Ordinariate for Catholics of Armenian Rite in Romania is nowadays centered on Gherla, and is placed under the jurisdiction of the Romanian Roman-Catholic Church archbishops of Alba Iulia.

Most Armenians from Transylvania were magyarized in the last half of the 19th century.

=== Romania ===
After the Armenian genocide of 1915, Romania was the first state to officially provide political asylum to refugees from the area.

Following World War 1, Romania acquired territories including 40,000 Armenians (15,000 in Bessarabia, 20,000 in Transylvania, and 5,000 refugees), thereby raising the Armenian population of Romania to 50,000—they were represented by the Union of Romanian Armenians (headed by Harutiun A. Khentirian who would later become the honorary consul-general of Armenia in Romania in 1922–1924) which sought to gain them minority rights and to facilitate repatriation to Armenia. Despite cosigning the Treaty of Sèvres with Armenia, Romania withheld de jure recognition "pending the final determination of Armenia's boundaries and ratification of the Turkish peace treaty."

In 1940 about 40,000 Armenians lived in Romania. Under communist rule, Armenians started to leave the country, and Nicolae Ceaușescu's regime eventually closed all Armenian schools.

In the 1990s, after the dissolution of the USSR, the poor economic conditions in Armenia and the military conflicts in the Caucasus, Iraq or Lebanon caused a number of Armenians to seek a better future in Romania as emigrants or travel through Romania to Western Europe or the United States. Since the 1990s, Armenians of Romania enjoyed a cultural revival. As a state-recognized national minority, the Armenians of Romania have 1 seat in the Chamber of Deputies. The Armenians of Romania have 3 newspapers: Nor Ghiank, Ararat and the Romanian-funded Lăcașuri de cult.

== Churches and monasteries ==
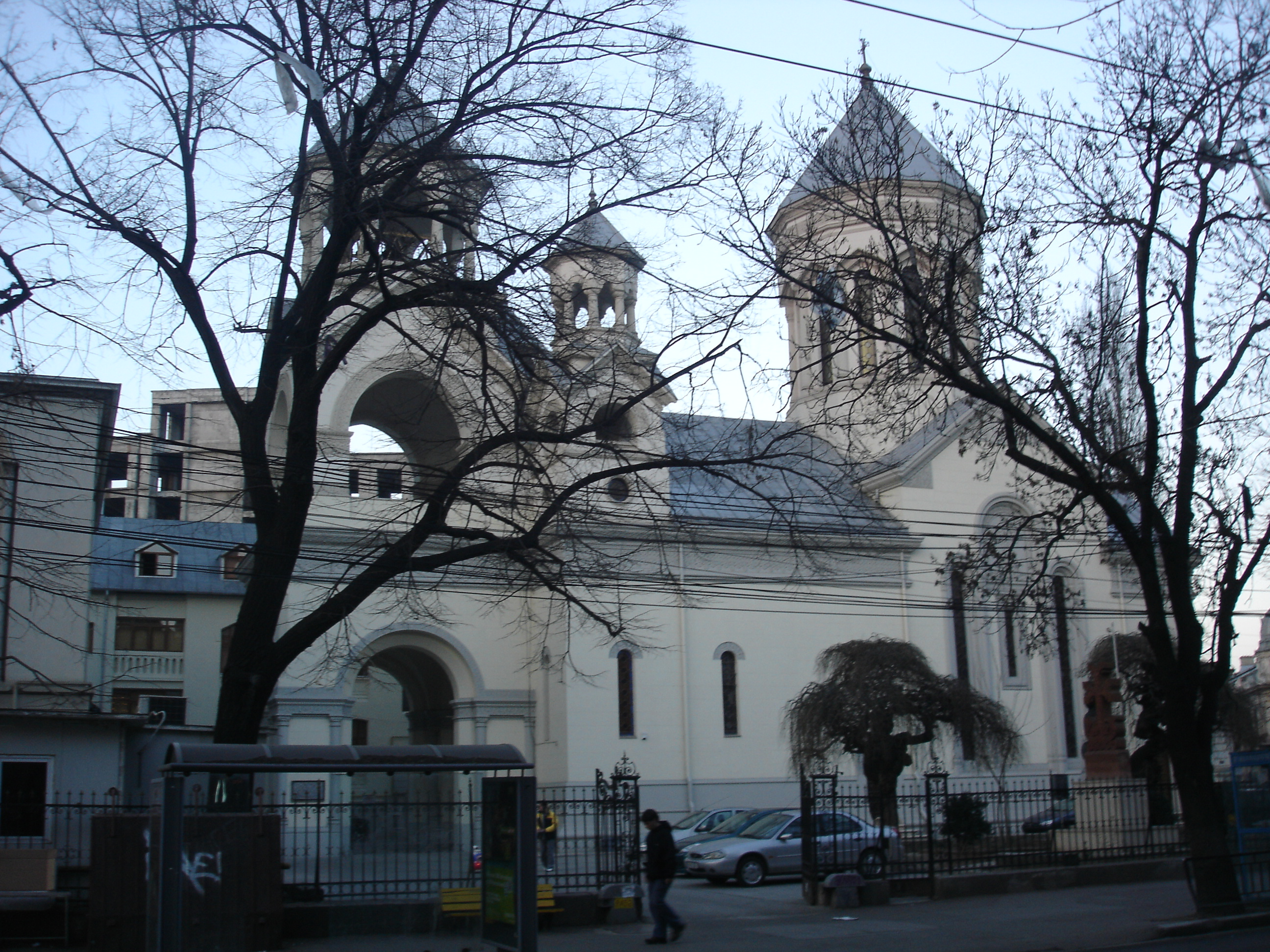
Armenian Church in Bucharest

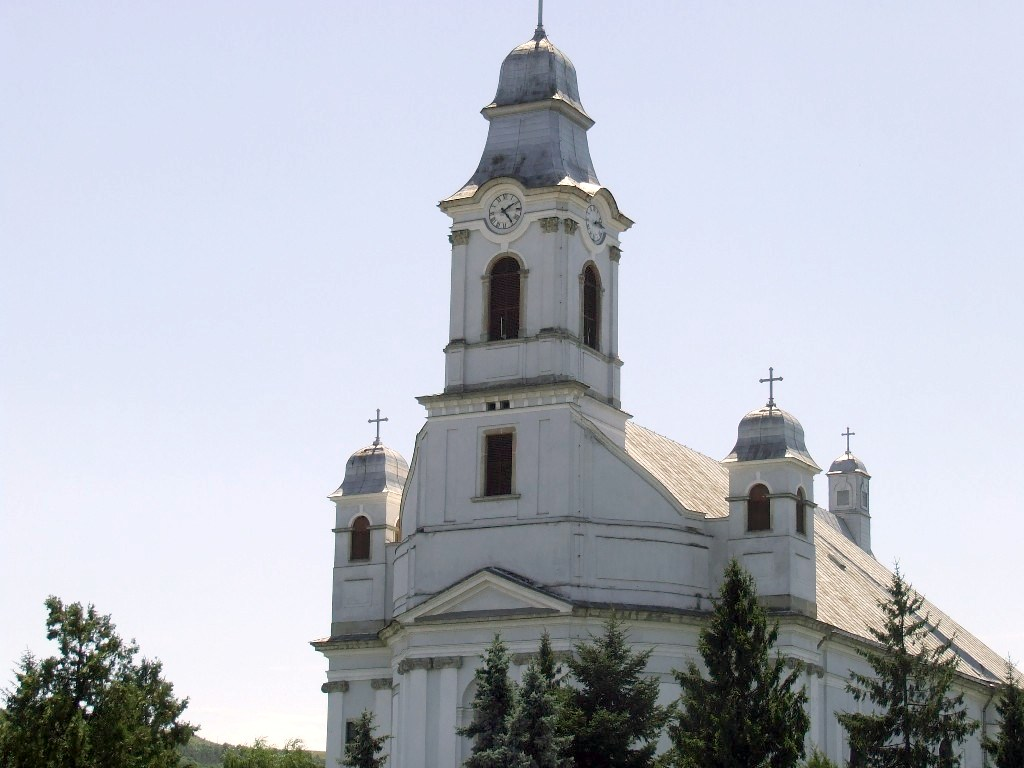
Armenian Catholic Holy Trinity Cathedral in Gherla

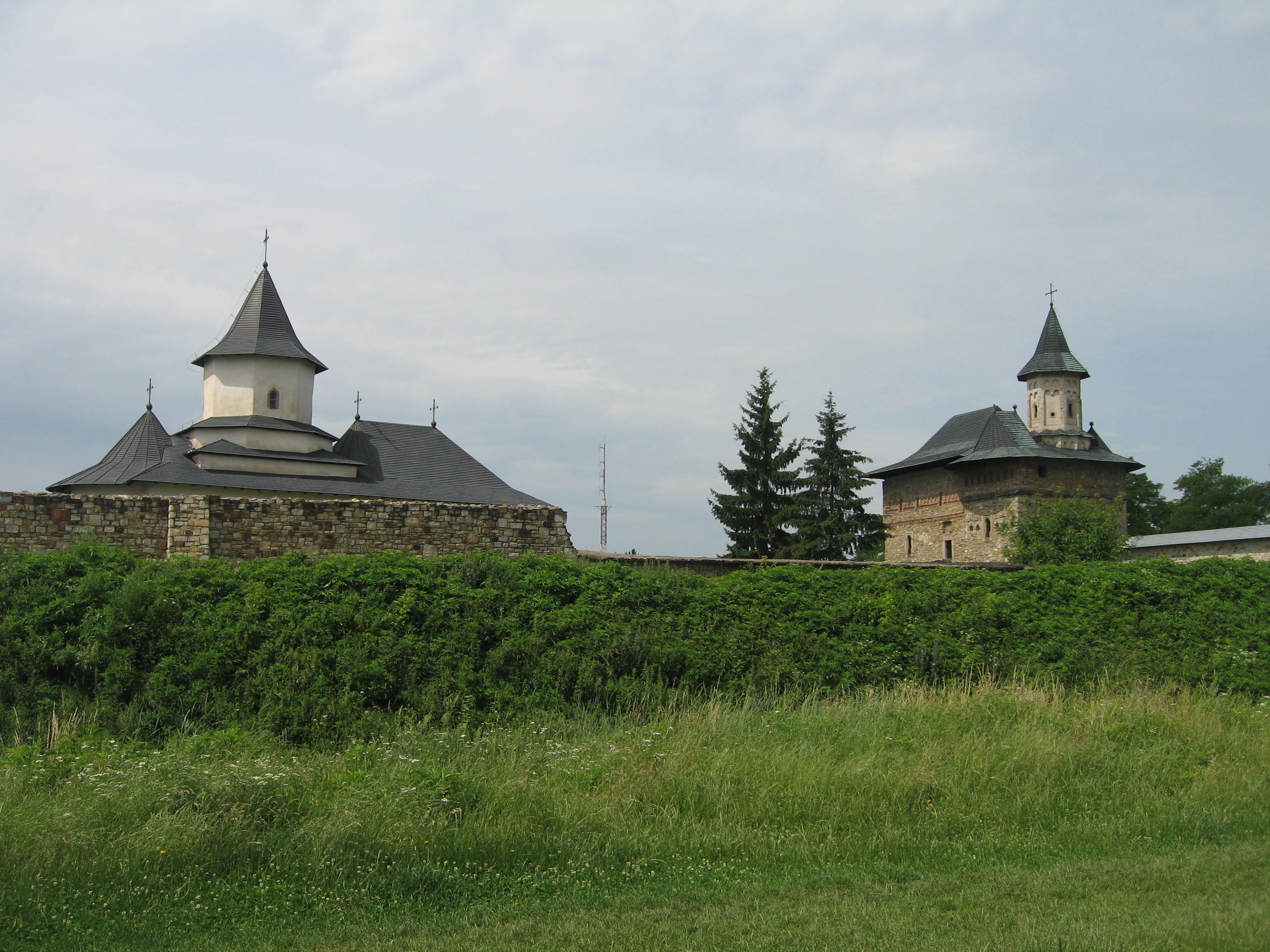
Zamca Monastery in Suceava

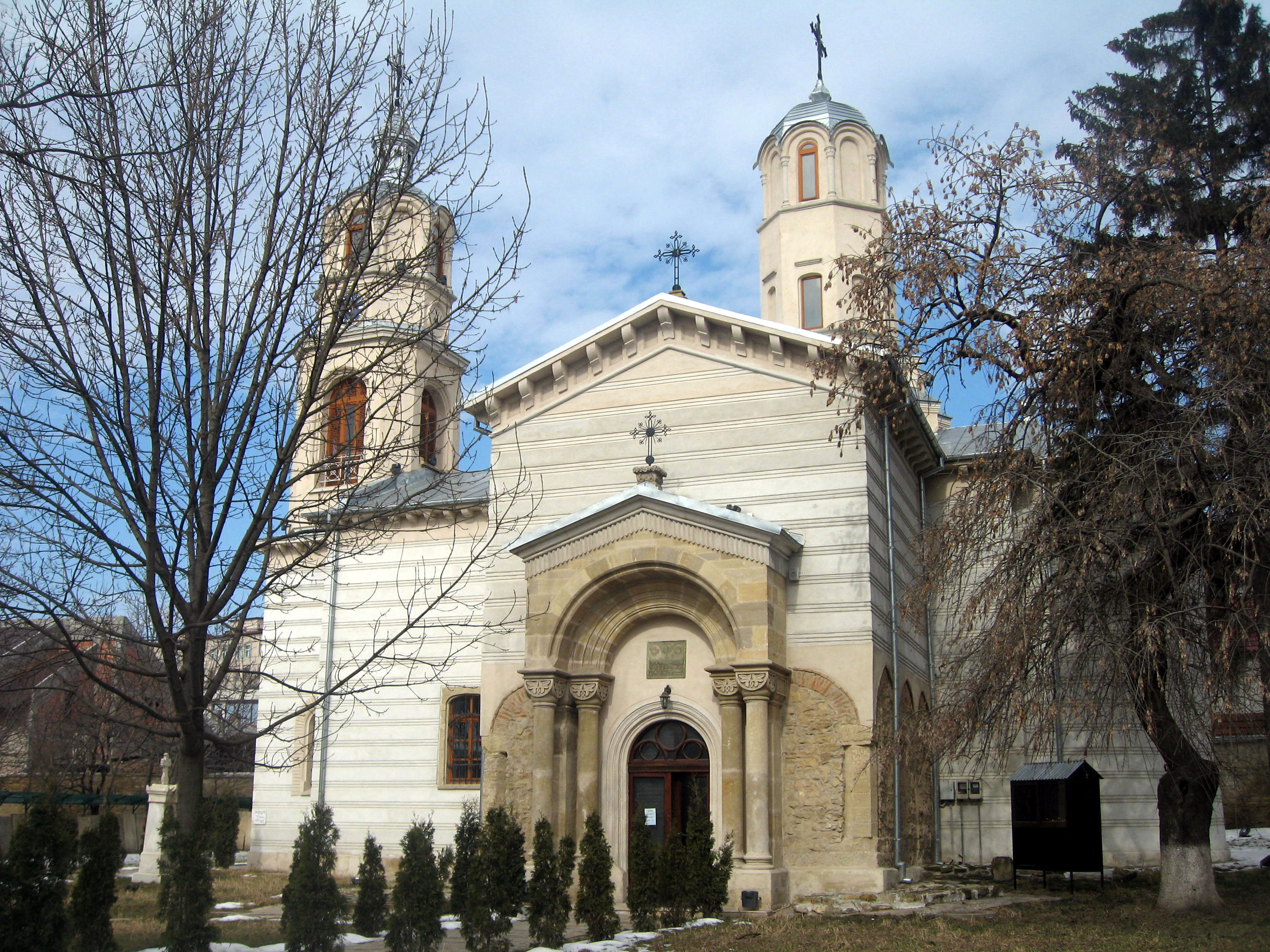
Armenian Church in Iași

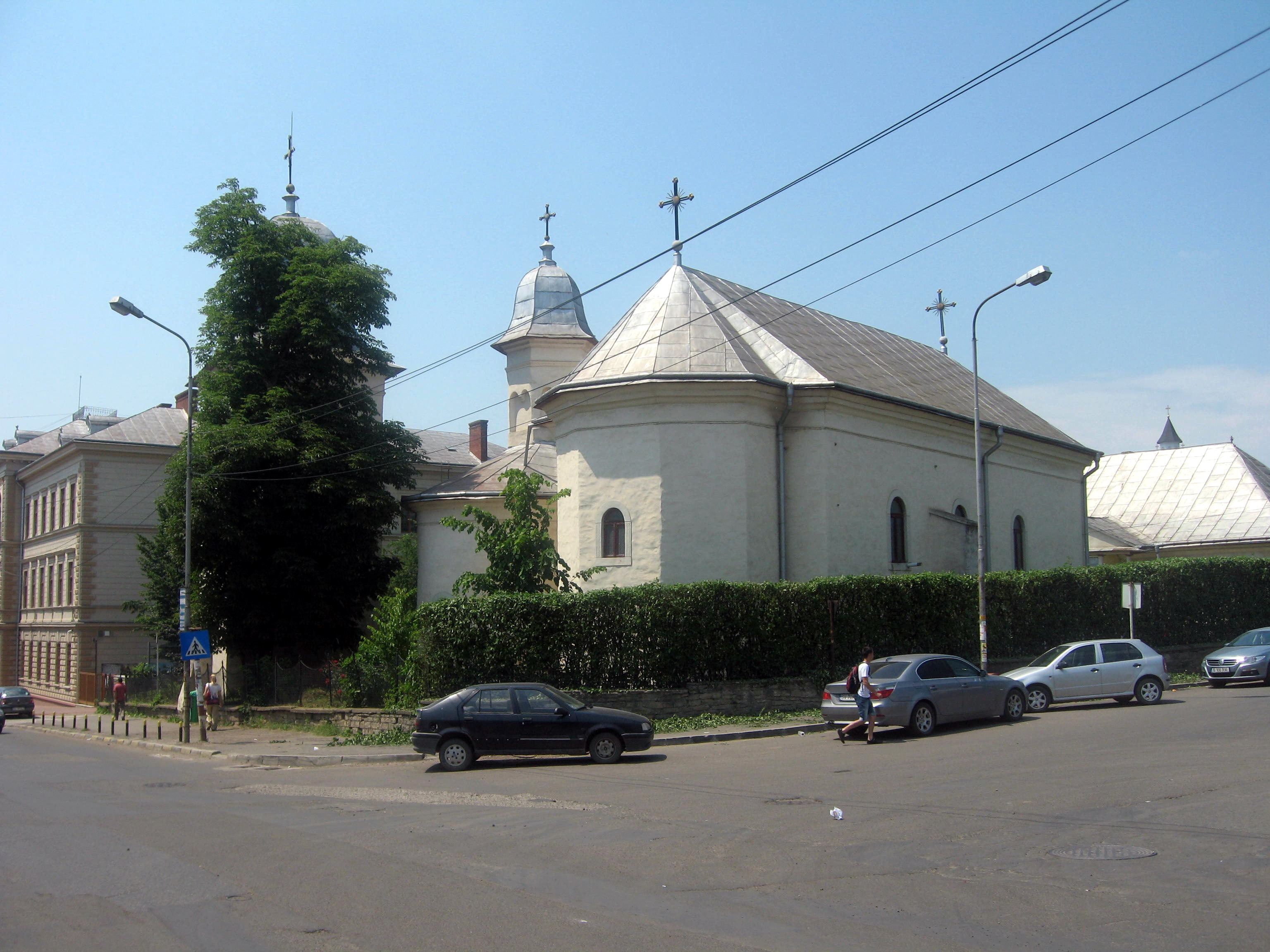
Armenian Holy Cross Church in Suceava

== Notable Romanians of Armenian descent ==
Romanians of Armenian descent have been very active in Romanian political, cultural, academic and social life. Most worthy of mention would be Vazgen I, Catholicos of Armenia, and Iacob Zadig, a general in the Romanian Army during World War I.

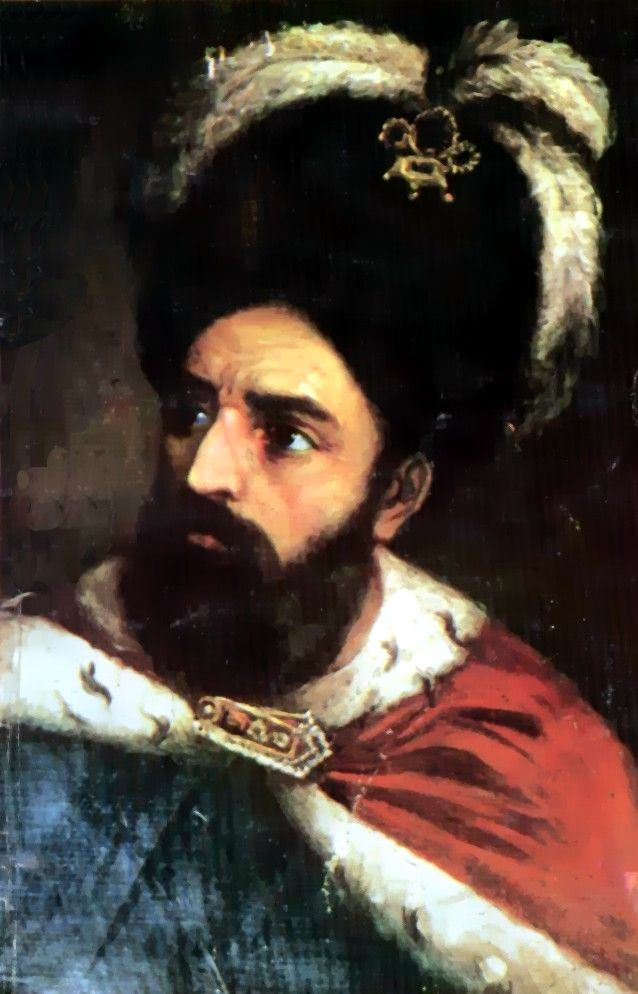
John III the Terrible

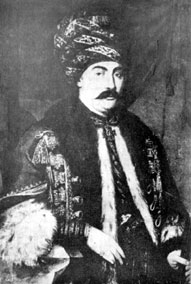
Manuc Bei

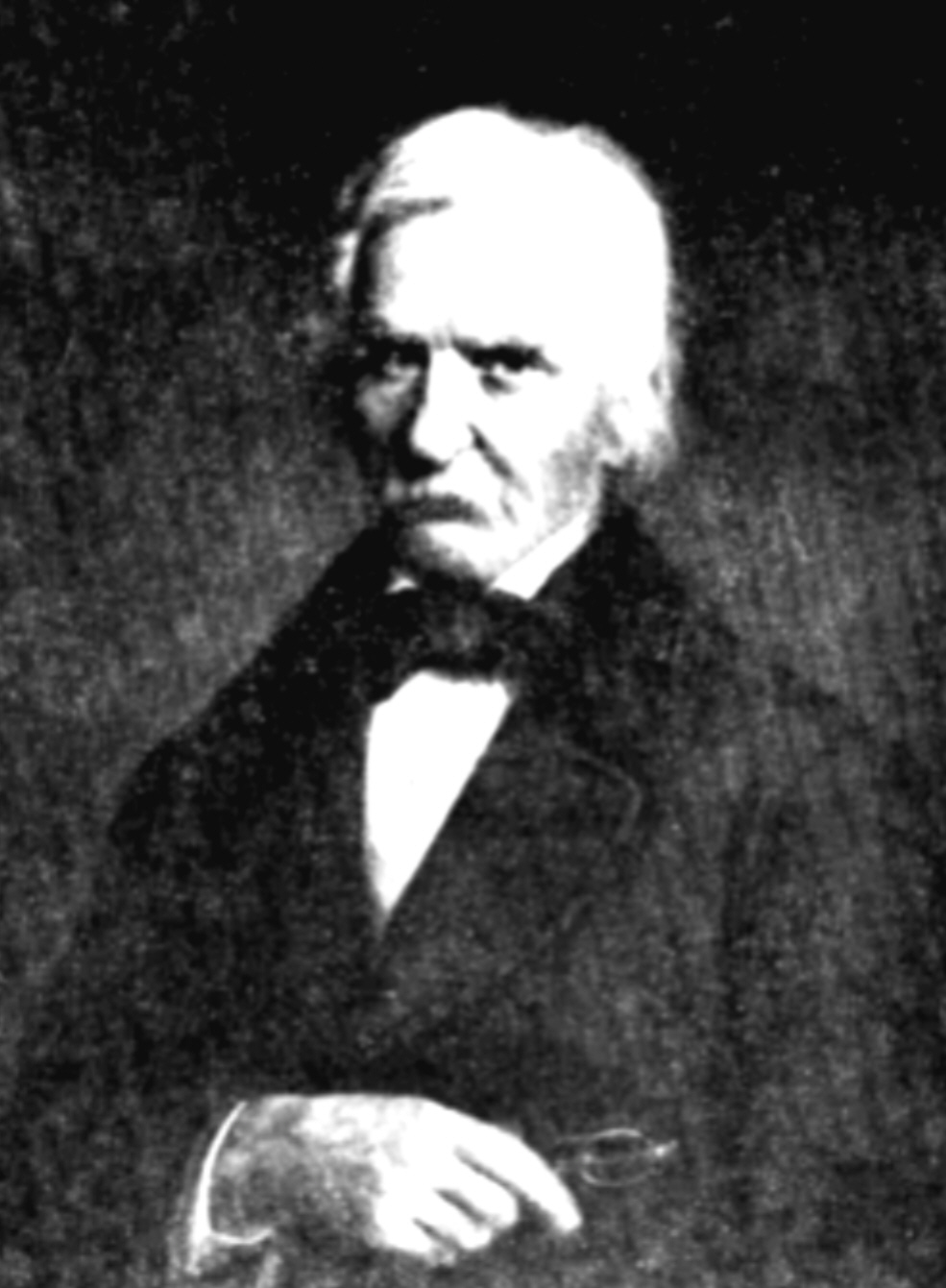
Gheorghe Asachi

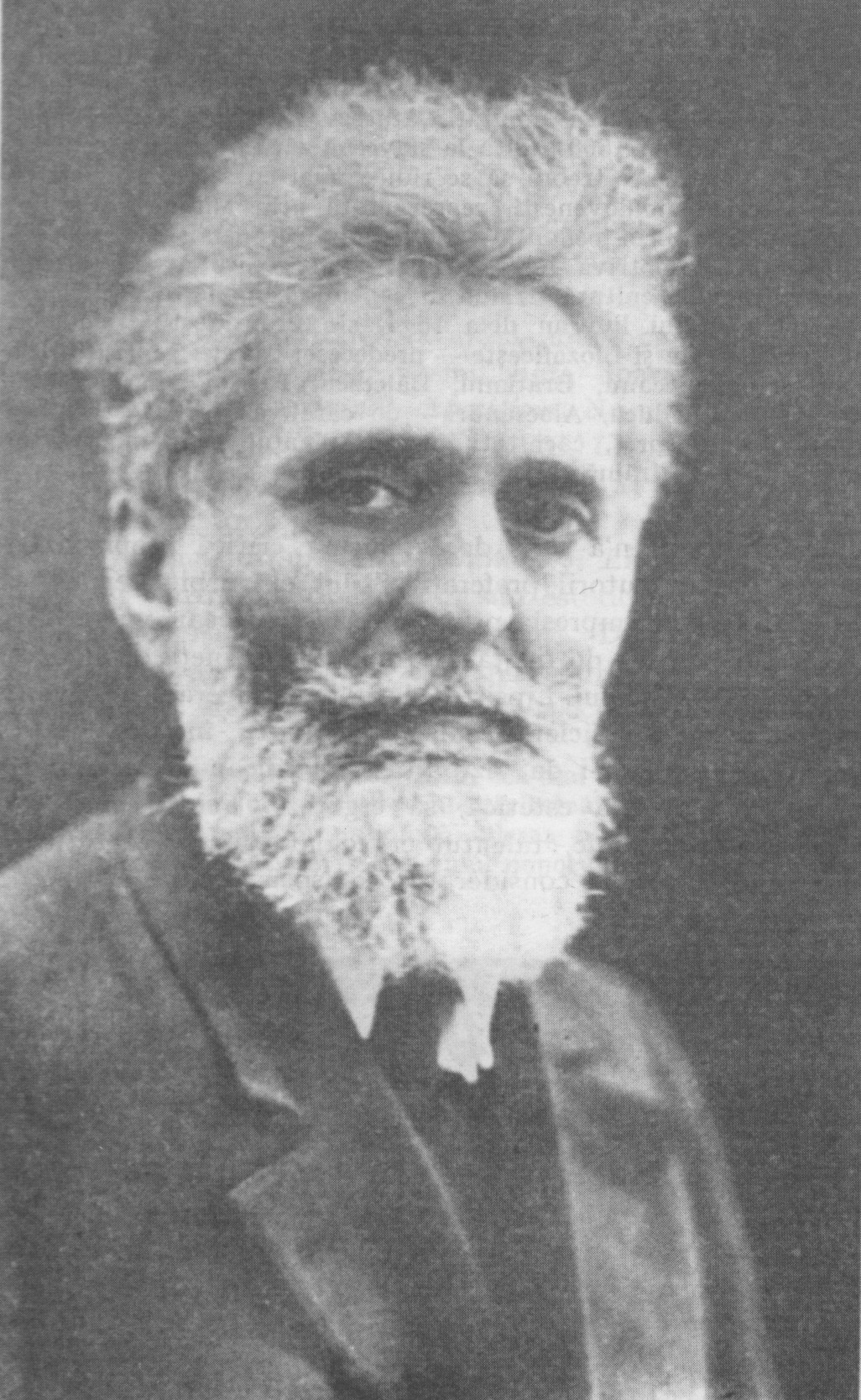
Garabet Ibrăileanu

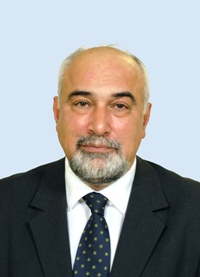
Varujan Vosganian

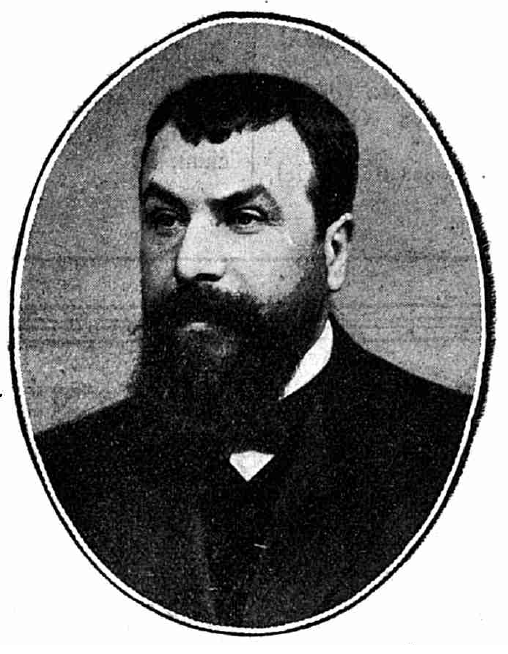
Vasile G. Morțun - journalist, politician, and art collector

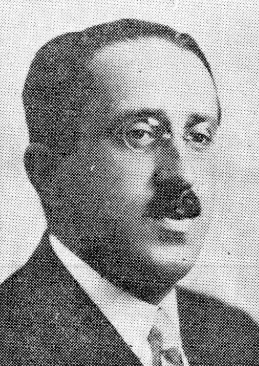
Virgil Madgearu, politician, prominent member and main theorist of the Peasants' Party

== See also ==
- Armenian diaspora in Europe
- Armenian-Romanian relations
- Armenians in Bulgaria
- Armenians in Hungary
- Armenians in Moldova
- Armenians in Serbia
- Armenians in Ukraine
- Gherla
- List of Romanians of Armenian descent
- Union of Armenians of Romania
