= Minister of National Defence (Romania) =

Minister of National Defense
- Ministerului Apărării Naționale (Romanian)

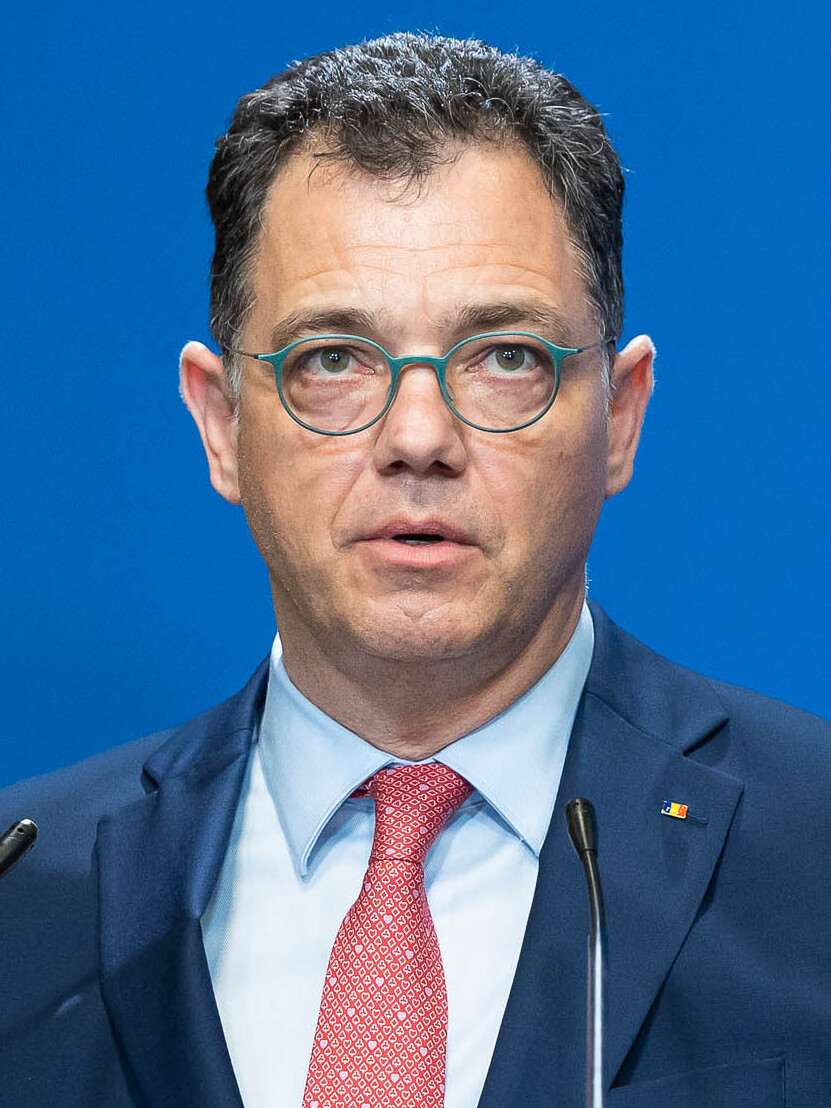
- Incumbent; Ștefan-Radu Oprea since 20 October 2026
- Ministry of National Defence
- Type: Minister
- Member of: The cabinet; Supreme Council of National Defence
- Reports to: The prime minister

The Romanian Minister of National Defence (Romanian: Ministerului Apărării Naționale) is the minister responsible for the Ministry of National Defence and the Romanian Armed Forces.

== List of officeholders ==
Romania used the Julian calendar until 1919, but all dates are given in the Gregorian calendar.

=== United Principalities (1861–1881) ===
No.	Portrait	Name (born–died)	Term of office			Political party	Cabinet	Ref.
No.	Portrait	Name (born–died)	Took office	Left office	Time in office	Political party	Cabinet	Ref.
Minister of War Ministru de Război
1		Prince; Ioan Grigore Ghica^{i} (1830–1881)	19 July 1861	29 September 1862	1 year, 72 days	Independent	Catargiu; N. Kretzulescu I	
2		General; Ion Emanoil Florescu^{i} (1819–1893)	30 August 1862	11 October 1863	1 year, 42 days	Independent	N. Kretzulescu I	
3		General; Alexandru Iacovache	12 October 1863	11 April 1864	182 days	Independent	Kogălniceanu	
4		General; Savel Manu (1824–1905)	12 April 1864	29 January 1866	1 year, 292 days	Independent	Kogălniceanu; Bosianu; N. Kretzulescu II	
5		Colonel; Alexandru Solomon (1834–1875)	30 January 1866	10 February 1866	11 days	Independent	N. Kretzulescu II	
6		Major; Dimitrie Lecca^{i} (1832–1888)	11 February 1866	10 May 1866	88 days	Independent	Ghica I	
(1)		Prince; Ioan Grigore Ghica^{ii} (1830–1881)	11 May 1866	5 August 1866	86 days	Independent	Catargiu I Ghica II	
7		Colonel; Nicolae Haralambie (1835–1908)	6 August 1866	7 February 1867	185 days	Independent	Ghica II	
8		General; Tobias Gherghely (1835–1883)	8 February 1867	23 May 1867	104 days	Independent	Ghica II; C.A. Kretzulescu	
9		General; Gheorghe Adrian (1820–1889)	24 May 1867	11 August 1868	1 year, 79 days	Independent	C.A. Kretzulescu; S. Golescu; N. Golescu	
–		Ion C. Brătianu^{i} (1821–1891) acting	12 August 1868	15 November 1868	95 days	Independent	N. Golescu	
10		Colonel; Ioan Alexandru Duca (1816–1889)	16 November 1868	13 January 1869	58 days	Independent	Ghica	
11		General; Gheorghe Manu^{i} (1833–1911)	14 July 1869	17 December 1870	1 year, 156 days	Independent	Ghica; Golescu; Epureanu I	
12		Colonel; Eustațiu Pencovici (1836–1899)	18 December 1870	10 March 1871	82 days	Independent	Ghica III	
13		General; Christian Tell (1808–1884)	11 March 1871	13 March 1871	2 days	Independent	Catargiu II	
(2)		General; Ion Emanoil Florescu^{ii} (1819–1893)	14 March 1871	26 April 1876	5 years, 43 days	Independent	Catargiu II; Florescu I	
(2)		General; Ion Emanoil Florescu^{ii} (1819–1893)	14 March 1871	26 April 1876	5 years, 43 days	National Liberal Party	Catargiu II; Florescu I	
14		General; Gheorghe Slăniceanu^{i} (1835–1885)	27 April 1876	1 April 1877	339 days	Independent	Epureanu II; Brătianu I	
15		General; Alexandru Cernat^{i} (1828–1893)	2 April 1877	19 August 1877	139 days	National Liberal Party	Brătianu I	
–		Ion C. Brătianu (1821–1891) acting	20 August 1877	17 March 1878	209 days	National Liberal Party	Brătianu I	
(15)		General; Alexandru Cernat^{ii} (1828–1893)	19 March 1878	24 November 1878	250 days	National Liberal Party	Brătianu I	
–		Ion C. Brătianu (1821–1891) acting	20 August 1877	17 March 1878	209 days	National Liberal Party	Brătianu II	
16		Colonel; Nicolae Dabija (1837–1884)	8 January 1879	10 July 1879	183 days	Independent	Brătianu II	
(6)		Major; Dimitrie Lecca^{ii} (1832–1888)	11 July 1879	28 April 1880	292 days	National Liberal Party	Brătianu III	
(14)		General; Gheorghe Slăniceanu^{ii} (1835–1885)	29 April 1880	8 June 1881	1 year, 40 days	Independent	Brătianu III; D. Brătianu	

=== Kingdom of Romania (1881–1947) ===
No.	Portrait	Name (born–died)	Term of office			Political party	Cabinet	Ref.
No.	Portrait	Name (born–died)	Took office	Left office	Time in office	Political party	Cabinet	Ref.
Minister of War Ministru de Război
1		Ion C. Brătianu^{ii}	1 August 1882	22 June 1884	1 year, 326 days	National Liberal Party	Brătianu IV	
2		General; Ștefan Fălcoianu	23 June 1884	12 January 1886	1 year, 203 days		Brătianu IV	
3		General; Alexandru Anghelescu	21 February 1886	4 November 1887	1 year, 256 days		Brătianu IV	
(1)		Ion C. Brătianu^{iii}	5 November 1887	23 March 1888	139 days	National Liberal Party	Brătianu IV	
4		General; Constantin Barozzi	23 March 1888	11 November 1888	233 days		Rosetti I	
5		General; Gheorghe Manu^{ii}	12 November 1888	4 November 1889	357 days		Rosetti II; Catargiu III	
6		General; Matei Vlădescu	5 November 1889	20 February 1891	1 year, 107 days		Manu	
7		General; Iacob Lahovary^{i}	21 February 1891	21 February 1894	3 years, 0 days		Florescu II; Catargiu IV	
8		Lascăr Catargiu	22 February 1894	11 June 1894	109 days	Conservative Party	Catargiu IV	
9		Constantin Poenaru	12 June 1894	3 October 1895	1 year, 113 days		Catargiu IV	
10		Constantin Budișteanu	4 October 1895	21 November 1896	1 year, 48 days		Sturdza I	
10		Constantin I. Stoicescu	21 November 1896	24 November 1896	3 days		Aurelian	
11		General; Anton Berindei	25 November 1896	10 April 1899	2 years, 136 days		Aurelian; Sturdza II	
(7)		General; Iacob Lahovary^{ii}	11 April 1899	13 February 1901	1 year, 308 days		Cantacuzino I Carp I	
12		D. A. Sturza	14 February 1901	21 December 1904	3 years, 311 days	National Liberal Party	Sturdza III	
(5)		General; Gheorghe Manu^{iii}	22 December 1904	11 March 1906	1 year, 79 days		Cantacuzino II	
13		General; Alexandru Averescu	13 March 1906	3 March 1909	2 years, 355 days		Sturdza IV; I. I. C. Brătianu I	
14		Toma Stelian	4 March 1909	31 October 1909	241 days		I. I. C. Brătianu I	
15		General; Grigore C. Crăiniceanu	1 November 1909	28 December 1910	1 year, 57 days		I. I. C. Brătianu I	
16		Nicolae Filipescu	29 December 1910	27 March 1912	1 year, 89 days		Carp II	
17		General; Ioan Argetoianu	29 March 1912	13 October 1912	198 days		Maiorescu I	
18		General; Constantin Hârjeu^{i}	14 October 1912	3 January 1914	1 year, 81 days		Maiorescu II	
19		Ion I. C. Brătianu^{i}	4 January 1914	14 August 1916	2 years, 223 days	National Liberal Party	I. I. C. Brătianu III	
20		Vintilă Brătianu^{i}	15 August 1916	9 July 1917	328 days	National Liberal Party	I. I. C. Brătianu III–IV	
(20)		Vintilă Brătianu^{ii}	9 July 1917	19 July 1917	10 days	National Liberal Party	I. I. C. Brătianu IV	
21		General; Constantin Iancovescu	20 July 1917	5 March 1918	228 days		I. I. C. Brătianu IV; Averescu I	
(18)		General; Constantin Hârjeu^{ii}	6 March 1918	23 October 1918	231 days		Marghiloman	
22		General; Eremia Grigorescu	24 October 1918	28 November 1918	35 days		Coandă	
23		General; Arthur Văitoianu	29 November 1918	26 September 1919	301 days		I. I. C. Brătianu V	
24		General; Ioan Rășcanu^{i}	27 September 1919	1 March 1920	156 days		Văitoianu; Vaida-Voevod I	
25		General; Traian Moșoiu	2 March 1920	11 March 1920	9 days			
(24)		General; Ioan Rășcanu^{ii}	12 March 1920	15 December 1921	1 year, 278 days		Vaida-Voevod I Averescu II	
26		General; Ștefan Holban	17 December 1921	18 January 1922	32 days		Ionescu	
(19)		Ion I. C. Brătianu^{ii}	19 January 1922	19 April 1922	90 days	National Liberal Party	I. I. C. Brătianu VI	
27		General; Gheorghe Mărdărescu	20 April 1922	29 March 1926	3 years, 343 days		I. I. C. Brătianu VI	
28		General; Ludovic Mircescu	30 March 1926	3 June 1927	1 year, 65 days		Averescu III	
29		General; Paul Angelescu^{i}	4 June 1927	9 November 1928	1 year, 158 days		Știrbey; I. I. C. Brătianu VII; V. I. C. Brătianu	
30		General; Henri Cihoski	10 November 1928	4 April 1930	1 year, 145 days		Maniu I	
31		Iuliu Maniu	5 April 1930	13 April 1930	8 days	National Peasants' Party	Maniu I	
32		General; Nicolae Condeescu	14 April 1930	18 April 1931	1 year, 4 days		Maniu I Mironescu I Maniu II; Mironescu II	
33		General; Amza C. Ștefănescu	19 April 1931	11 August 1932	1 year, 114 days		Iorga; Vaida-Voevod II	
34		General; Nicolae Samsonovici	11 August 1932	14 November 1933	1 year, 95 days		Vaida-Voevod III; Maniu III; Vaida-Voevod IV	
35		General; Nicolae Uica	14 November 1933	1 June 1934	199 days		Duca; Angelescu; Tătărăscu I	
36		Gheorghe Tătărescu	1 June 1934	26 July 1934	55 days	National Liberal Party	Tătărăscu I	
(29)		General; Paul Anghelescu^{ii}	27 July 1934	8 August 1937	3 years, 12 days		Tătărăscu I–II–III	
37		Aviation General; Radu Irimescu	28 August 1937	4 September 1937	7 days		Tătărăscu III	
38		Division General; Constantin Ilasievici	4 September 1937	27 December 1937	114 days		Tătărăscu III–IV	
39		Division General; Ion Antonescu^{i}	28 December 1937	30 March 1938	92 days	Mil.	Goga; Cristea I	
40		Division General; Gheorghe Argeșanu	30 March 1938	13 October 1938	197 days		Cristea II	
41		Division General; Nicolae Ciupercă	13 October 1938	1 February 1939	111 days		Cristea II	
42		Armand Călinescu	1 February 1939	21 September 1939	232 days		Cristea III; Călinescu	
43		Army Corps General; Ioan Ilcuș	21 September 1939	4 July 1940	287 days		Argeșanu; Argetoianu; Tătărăscu V	
44		General; Constantin Nicolescu	4 July 1940	4 September 1940	62 days		Gigurtu	
(39)		Division General; Ion Antonescu^{ii}	4 September 1940	27 January 1941	145 days	Mil.	Antonescu I–II	
45		General; Iosif Iacobici	27 January 1941	22 September 1941	238 days		Antonescu III	
(39)		Division General; Ion Antonescu^{iii}	22 September 1941	23 January 1942	123 days	Mil.	Antonescu III	
46		General; Constantin Pantazi	23 January 1942	23 August 1944	2 years, 213 days	Mil.	Antonescu III	
47		Army Corps General; Ioan-Mihai Racoviță	24 August 1944	5 November 1944	73 days	Mil.	Sănătescu I	
48		Army Corps General; Constantin Sănătescu	6 November 1944	6 December 1944	30 days	Mil.	Sănătescu II	
49		Army Corps General; Ion Negulescu	7 December 1944	6 March 1945	89 days	Mil.	Rădescu	
50		Army Corps General; Constantin Vasiliu-Rășcanu	7 March 1945	29 November 1946	1 year, 267 days	Mil.	Groza I	
51		Army Corps General; Mihail Lascăr	29 November 1946	27 December 1947	1 year, 28 days	Mil.	Groza II	

=== Socialist Republic of Romania (1947–1989) ===
No.	Portrait	Name (born–died)	Term of office			Political party	Cabinet	Ref.
No.	Portrait	Name (born–died)	Took office	Left office	Time in office	Political party	Cabinet	Ref.
Minister of War Ministru de Război
1		Army General; Emil Bodnăraș (1904–1976)	27 December 1947	3 October 1955	7 years, 280 days	Romanian Workers' Party	Groza II–III–IV; Gheorghiu-Dej I–II	
Minister of National Defence Ministrul Apărării Naționale
2		Army General; Leontin Sălăjan (1913–1966)	3 October 1955	28 August 1966	10 years, 329 days	Romanian Communist Party	Stoica I–II; Maurer I–II–III	
3		Army General; Ioan Ioniță (1924–1987)	29 October 1966	16 June 1976	9 years, 231 days	Romanian Communist Party	Maurer III–IV–V; Mănescu I–II	
4		Colonel General; Ioan Coman (born 1926)	16 June 1976	29 March 1980	3 years, 287 days	Romanian Communist Party	Mănescu II; Verdeț I	
5		Colonel General; Constantin Olteanu (1928–2018)	29 March 1980	16 December 1985	5 years, 262 days	Romanian Communist Party	Verdeț I Dăscălescu I–II	
6		Colonel General; Vasile Milea (1927–1989)	16 December 1985	22 December 1989 †	4 years, 6 days	Romanian Communist Party	Dăscălescu II	
–		Army General; Victor Stănculescu (1928–2016) acting	22 December 1989	26 December 1989	4 days	Romanian Communist Party	Dăscălescu II	

=== Romania (1989–present) ===
No.	Portrait	Name (born–died)	Term of office			Political party	Cabinet	Ref.
No.	Portrait	Name (born–died)	Took office	Left office	Time in office	Political party	Cabinet	Ref.
Minister of National Defence Ministrul Apărării Naționale
1		Army General; Nicolae Militaru	26 December 1989	16 February 1990	52 days	Mil.	Roman I	
2		Army General; Victor Stănculescu	16 February 1990	29 April 1991	1 year, 72 days	Mil.	Roman I–II	
3		Lieutenant General; Niculae Spiroiu	30 April 1991	6 March 1994	2 years, 310 days	Mil.	Roman III; Stolojan; Văcăroiu	
4		Gheorghe Tinca	6 March 1994	12 December 1996	2 years, 281 days	Social Democratic Party	Văcăroiu	
5		Victor Babiuc	12 December 1996	11 February 1998	1 year, 61 days	Democratic Party	Ciorbea	
6		Constantin Dudu Ionescu	12 February 1998	16 April 1998	63 days	Christian Democratic National Peasants' Party	Ciorbea	
(5)		Victor Babiuc	16 April 1998	13 March 2000	1 year, 332 days	Democratic Party	Vasile; Isărescu	
7		Sorin Frunzăverde^{i}	13 March 2000	28 December 2000	290 days	Democratic Party	Isărescu	
8		Ioan Mircea Pașcu	28 December 2000	28 December 2004	4 years, 0 days	Party of Social Democracy in Romania; Social Democratic Party	Năstase	
9		Teodor Atanasiu	28 December 2004	25 October 2006	1 year, 301 days	National Liberal Party	Tăriceanu I	
Minister of Defence Ministrul Apărării
(7)		Sorin Frunzăverde^{ii}	25 October 2006	10 April 2007	167 days	Democratic Party	Tăriceanu I	
10		Teodor Meleșcanu	10 April 2007	22 December 2008	1 year, 256 days	National Liberal Party	Tăriceanu II	
Minister of National Defence Ministrul Apărării Naționale
11		Mihai Stănișoară	22 December 2008	23 December 2009	1 year, 1 day	Democratic Liberal Party	Boc I	
12		Gabriel Oprea	23 December 2009	9 February 2012	2 years, 48 days	Indep./UNPR	Boc II	
12		Gabriel Oprea	9 February 2012	7 May 2012	88 days	Indep./UNPR	Ungureanu	
13		Corneliu Dobrițoiu	7 May 2012	20 December 2012	227 days	National Liberal Party	Ponta I	
14		Mircea Dușa	21 December 2012	17 November 2015	2 years, 331 days	Social Democratic Party	Ponta II–III–IV	
15		Mihnea Motoc	17 November 2015	4 January 2017	1 year, 48 days	Independent	Cioloș	
16		Gabriel-Beniamin Leș	4 January 2017	29 June 2017	176 days	Social Democratic Party	Grindeanu	
17		Adrian Țuțuianu	29 June 2017	5 September 2017	68 days	Social Democratic Party	Tudose	
18		Mihai Fifor	12 September 2017	20 November 2018	1 year, 69 days	Social Democratic Party	Tudose; Dăncilă	
(16)		Gabriel-Beniamin Leș	20 November 2018	4 November 2019	349 days	Social Democratic Party	Dăncilă	
19		Nicolae Ciucă	4 November 2019	25 November 2021	2 years, 21 days	Independent	Orban I–II	
20		Vasile Dîncu	25 November 2021	24 October 2022	333 days	Social Democratic Party	Ciucă	
–		Nicolae Ciucă acting	24 October 2022	1 November 2022	8 days	Independent	Ciucă	
21		Angel Tîlvăr	1 November 2022	23 June 2025	2 years, 234 days	Social Democratic Party	Ciucă; Ciolacu I–II	
22		Ionuț Moșteanu	23 June 2025	28 November 2025	158 days	Save Romania Union	Bolojan	
–		Radu-Dinel Miruță acting	28 November 2025	23 December 2025	25 days	Save Romania Union	Bolojan	
23		Radu-Dinel Miruță	23 December 2025	20 October 2026	301 days	Save Romania Union	Bolojan	
24		Ștefan-Radu Oprea	20 October 2026	Incumbent	1 day	Social Democratic Party	Niculescu	
