= List of heads of government of Romania =

This is a list consisting of all the heads of government of modern and contemporary Romania (i.e. prime ministers, both in full constitutional powers and acting or ad interim), since the formal unification of the United Principalities of Moldavia and Wallachia in 1862 to the present day.

The incumbent prime minister of Romania, as of 3 November 2026, is Luca Niculescu, who has been serving since 20 October 2026.

== Affiliations ==
The political stance of Romanian prime ministers prior to the development of a modern party system is given by the following affiliations in the table below:

C (Conservative)	MC (Moderate Conservative)
RL (Radical Liberal)	ML (Moderate Liberal)

The political stance of Romanian prime ministers after the development of a modern party system is given by the following affiliations in the table below:

PNL = National Liberal Party (historical)/(contemporary)	PC = Conservative Party
PNR = Romanian National Party	PP = People's Party
PNȚ/PNȚCD = National Peasants' Party/Christian Democratic National Peasants' Party	PCD = Conservative-Democratic Party
PND = Democratic Nationalist Party	PNC = National Christian Party
FRN = National Renaissance Front (from 1940 PN; Party of the Nation)	FP = Ploughmen's Front
PMR = Romanian Workers' Party (from 1965 PCR; Romanian Communist Party)	FSN = National Salvation Front
PDSR = Party of Social Democracy in Romania (from 2001 PSD; Social Democratic Party)	PSDR = Romanian Social Democratic Party
PDL = Democratic Liberal Party	UNPR = National Union for the Progress of Romania
ALDE = Alliance of Liberals and Democrats
Mil. = Military	Ind. = Independent

Ad interim/acting officeholders are denoted by italics.

== List of officeholders ==
=== United Principalities (1859–1881) ===
From 1859 to 1862, the two Romanian principalities (more specifically Moldavia and Wallachia) had their own government each, and a cabinet, seated in Iași and Bucharest respectively. In 1862, Prince Alexandru Ioan Cuza changed the Constitution and from then on there has been a single unified central government, permanently seated in Bucharest, the capital of Romania.

No.	Portrait	Name (Birth–Death)	Term of office			Political party	Elected	Cabinet	Domnitor (Reign)
No.	Portrait	Name (Birth–Death)	Took office	Left office	Time in office	Political party	Elected	Cabinet	Domnitor (Reign)
Presidents of the Council of Ministers (1862–1881)
1		Barbu Catargiu (1807–1862)	22 January 1862	8 June 1862 †	137 days	Con.	?	Catargiu	Alexandru Ioan Cuza (1859–1866)
—		Apostol Arsache (1789–1869) acting	8 June 1862	23 June 1862	15 days	Con.	—	Catargiu	Alexandru Ioan Cuza (1859–1866)
2		Nicolae Kretzulescu (1812–1900)	24 June 1862	11 October 1863	1 year, 109 days	Mod. Lib.	—	N. Kretzulescu I	Alexandru Ioan Cuza (1859–1866)
3		Mihail Kogălniceanu (1817–1891)	11 October 1863	26 January 1865	1 year, 107 days	Mod. Lib.	1864	Kogălniceanu	Alexandru Ioan Cuza (1859–1866)
4		Constantin Bosianu (1815–1882)	26 January 1865	14 June 1865	139 days	Mod. Lib.	—	Bosianu	Alexandru Ioan Cuza (1859–1866)
(2)		Nicolae Kretzulescu (1812–1900)	14 June 1865	11 February 1866	242 days	Mod. Lib.	—	N. Kretzulescu II	Alexandru Ioan Cuza (1859–1866)
5		Ion Ghica (1816–1897)	11 February 1866	10 May 1866	88 days	Mod. Lib.	Apr. 1866	Ghica I	Alexandru Ioan Cuza (1859–1866)
5		Ion Ghica (1816–1897)	11 February 1866	10 May 1866	88 days	Mod. Lib.	Apr. 1866	Ghica I	Carol I (1866–1914)
6		Lascăr Catargiu (1823–1899)	11 May 1866	13 July 1866	63 days	Con.	—	Catargiu I	Carol I (1866–1914)
(5)		Ion Ghica (1816–1897)	15 July 1866	21 February 1867	221 days	Mod. Lib.	Nov. 1866	Ghica II	Carol I (1866–1914)
7		Constantin A. Kretzulescu (1809–1884)	1 March 1867	5 August 1867	157 days	Rad. Lib.	—	C.A. Kretzulescu	Carol I (1866–1914)
8		Ștefan Golescu (1809–1874)	17 August 1867	29 April 1868	256 days	Rad. Lib.	1867	Golescu	Carol I (1866–1914)
9		Nicolae Golescu (1810–1877)	1 May 1868	15 November 1868	198 days	Rad. Lib.	1868	Golescu	Carol I (1866–1914)
10		Dimitrie Ghica (1816–1897)	16 November 1868	27 January 1870	1 year, 72 days	Mod. Con.	—	Ghica	Carol I (1866–1914)
11		Alexandru G. Golescu (1819–1881)	2 February 1870	18 April 1870	75 days	Mod. Lib.	1869	Golescu	Carol I (1866–1914)
12		Manolache Costache Epureanu (1823–1880)	20 April 1870	14 December 1870	238 days	Con.	—	Epureanu I	Carol I (1866–1914)
(5)		Ion Ghica (1816–1897)	18 December 1870	11 March 1871	83 days	Mod. Lib.	—	Ghica III	Carol I (1866–1914)
(6)		Lascăr Catargiu (1823–1899)	11 March 1871	31 March 1876	5 years, 20 days	Con.	—	Catargiu II	Carol I (1866–1914)
13		Ioan Emanoil Florescu (1819–1893)	4 April 1876	26 April 1876	22 days	Con.	—	Florescu I	Carol I (1866–1914)
(12)		Manolache Costache Epureanu (1823–1880)	27 April 1876	23 July 1876	87 days	PNL	—	Epureanu II	Carol I (1866–1914)
14		Ion Brătianu (1821–1891)	24 July 1876	13 March 1881	4 years, 232 days	PNL	—	I. Brătianu I	Carol I (1866–1914)
14		Ion Brătianu (1821–1891)	24 July 1876	13 March 1881	4 years, 232 days	PNL	—	I. Brătianu II	Carol I (1866–1914)
14		Ion Brătianu (1821–1891)	24 July 1876	13 March 1881	4 years, 232 days	PNL	—	I. Brătianu III	Carol I (1866–1914)

=== Kingdom of Romania (1881–1947) ===
No.	Portrait	Name (Birth–Death)	Term of office			Political party	Elected	Cabinet	King (Reign)
No.	Portrait	Name (Birth–Death)	Took office	Left office	Time in office	Political party	Elected	Cabinet	King (Reign)
Presidents of the Council of Ministers (1881–1947)
14		Ion Brătianu (1821–1891)	13 March 1881	9 April 1881	27 days	PNL	—	I. Brătianu III	Carol I (1866–1914)
15		Dumitru Brătianu (1818–1892)	10 April 1881	8 June 1881	59 days	PNL	—	D. Brătianu	Carol I (1866–1914)
(14)		Ion Brătianu (1821–1891)	9 June 1881	20 March 1888	6 years, 285 days	PNL	—	I. Brătianu IV	Carol I (1866–1914)
16		Theodor Rosetti (1837–1923)	23 March 1888	22 March 1889	364 days	PC	—	Rosetti I	Carol I (1866–1914)
16		Theodor Rosetti (1837–1923)	23 March 1888	22 March 1889	364 days	PC	—	Rosetti II	Carol I (1866–1914)
(6)		Lascăr Catargiu (1823–1899)	29 March 1889	3 November 1889	219 days	PC	—	Catargiu III	Carol I (1866–1914)
17		Gheorghe Manu (1833–1911)	5 November 1889	15 February 1891	1 year, 102 days	PC	—	Manu	Carol I (1866–1914)
(13)		Ioan Emanoil Florescu (1819–1893)	21 February 1891	26 November 1891	278 days	PC	—	Florescu II	Carol I (1866–1914)
(6)		Lascăr Catargiu (1823–1899)	27 November 1891	3 October 1895	3 years, 310 days	PC	—	Catargiu IV	Carol I (1866–1914)
(6)		Lascăr Catargiu (1823–1899)	27 November 1891	3 October 1895	3 years, 310 days	PC	1892	Catargiu IV	Carol I (1866–1914)
18		Dimitrie Sturdza (1833–1914)	4 October 1895	21 November 1896	1 year, 48 days	PNL	—	Sturdza I	Carol I (1866–1914)
19		Petre S. Aurelian (1833–1909)	21 November 1896	26 March 1897	125 days	PNL	—	Aurelian	Carol I (1866–1914)
(18)		Dimitrie Sturdza (1833–1914)	31 March 1897	30 March 1899	1 year, 364 days	PNL	—	Sturdza II	Carol I (1866–1914)
20		Gheorghe Grigore Cantacuzino (1833–1913)	11 April 1899	7 July 1900	1 year, 87 days	PC	—	Cantacuzino I	Carol I (1866–1914)
21		Petre P. Carp (1837–1919)	7 July 1900	13 February 1901	221 days	PC	—	Carp I	Carol I (1866–1914)
(18)		Dimitrie Sturdza (1833–1914)	14 February 1901	20 December 1904	3 years, 310 days	PNL	—	Sturdza III	Carol I (1866–1914)
(18)		Dimitrie Sturdza (1833–1914)	14 February 1901	20 December 1904	3 years, 310 days	PNL	1901	Sturdza III	Carol I (1866–1914)
(20)		Gheorghe Grigore Cantacuzino (1833–1913)	22 December 1904	12 March 1907	2 years, 80 days	PC	—	Cantacuzino II	Carol I (1866–1914)
(18)		Dimitrie Sturdza (1833–1914)	12 March 1907	27 December 1908	1 year, 290 days	PNL	—	Sturdza IV	Carol I (1866–1914)
(18)		Dimitrie Sturdza (1833–1914)	12 March 1907	27 December 1908	1 year, 290 days	PNL	1907	Sturdza IV	Carol I (1866–1914)
22		Ion I. C. Brătianu (1864–1927)	27 December 1908	28 December 1910	2 years, 1 day	PNL	—	I.I.C. Brătianu I	Carol I (1866–1914)
22		Ion I. C. Brătianu (1864–1927)	27 December 1908	28 December 1910	2 years, 1 day	PNL	—	I.I.C. Brătianu II	Carol I (1866–1914)
(21)		Petre P. Carp (1837–1919)	29 December 1910	27 March 1912	1 year, 89 days	PC	—	Carp II	Carol I (1866–1914)
(21)		Petre P. Carp (1837–1919)	29 December 1910	27 March 1912	1 year, 89 days	PC	1911	Carp II	Carol I (1866–1914)
23		Titu Maiorescu (1840–1917)	28 March 1912	31 December 1913	1 year, 278 days	PC	—	Maiorescu I	Carol I (1866–1914)
23		Titu Maiorescu (1840–1917)	28 March 1912	31 December 1913	1 year, 278 days	PC	1912	Maiorescu I	Carol I (1866–1914)
23		Titu Maiorescu (1840–1917)	28 March 1912	31 December 1913	1 year, 278 days	PC	—	Maiorescu II	Carol I (1866–1914)
(22)		Ion I. C. Brătianu (Note: Due to World War I, the Romanian government served in refuge at Iași, between 3 December 1916 and 29 November 1918.) (1864–1927)	4 January 1914	26 January 1918	4 years, 22 days	PNL	—	I.I.C. Brătianu III	Carol I (1866–1914)
(22)		Ion I. C. Brătianu (1864–1927)	4 January 1914	26 January 1918	4 years, 22 days	PNL	1914	I.I.C. Brătianu III	Ferdinand I (1914–1927)
(22)		Ion I. C. Brătianu (1864–1927)	4 January 1914	26 January 1918	4 years, 22 days	PNL	—	I.I.C. Brătianu IV	Ferdinand I (1914–1927)
24		Alexandru Averescu (1859–1938)	29 January 1918	4 March 1918	34 days	Mil.	—	Averescu I	Ferdinand I (1914–1927)
25		Alexandru Marghiloman (1854–1925)	5 March 1918	23 October 1918	232 days	PC	—	Marghiloman	Ferdinand I (1914–1927)
25		Alexandru Marghiloman (1854–1925)	5 March 1918	23 October 1918	232 days	PC	1918	Marghiloman	Ferdinand I (1914–1927)
26		Constantin Coandă (1857–1932)	24 October 1918	29 November 1918	36 days	Mil.	—	Coandă	Ferdinand I (1914–1927)
(22)		Ion I. C. Brătianu (1864–1927)	29 November 1918	27 September 1919	289 days (Note: During this time, Romania changed its calendar, from the Julian calendar to the Gregorian calendar, and 1 April 1919 became 14 April 1919 (the month of April only had 17 days that year).)	PNL	—	I.I.C. Brătianu V	Ferdinand I (1914–1927)
27		Artur Văitoianu (1864–1956)	27 September 1919	30 November 1919	64 days	Mil.	—	Văitoianu	Ferdinand I (1914–1927)
28		Alexandru Vaida-Voevod (1872–1950)	1 December 1919	13 March 1920	103 days	PNR	1919	Vaida-Voevod I	Ferdinand I (1914–1927)
(24)		Alexandru Averescu (1859–1938)	13 March 1920	16 December 1921	1 year, 278 days	PP	—	Averescu II	Ferdinand I (1914–1927)
(24)		Alexandru Averescu (1859–1938)	13 March 1920	16 December 1921	1 year, 278 days	PP	1920	Averescu II	Ferdinand I (1914–1927)
29		Take Ionescu (1858–1922)	17 December 1921	17 January 1922	31 days	PCD	—	Ionescu	Ferdinand I (1914–1927)
(22)		Ion I. C. Brătianu (1864–1927)	19 January 1922	27 March 1926	4 years, 67 days	PNL	—	I.I.C. Brătianu VI	Ferdinand I (1914–1927)
(22)		Ion I. C. Brătianu (1864–1927)	19 January 1922	27 March 1926	4 years, 67 days	PNL	1922	I.I.C. Brătianu VI	Ferdinand I (1914–1927)
(24)		Alexandru Averescu (1859–1938)	30 March 1926	4 June 1927	1 year, 66 days	PP	—	Averescu III	Ferdinand I (1914–1927)
(24)		Alexandru Averescu (1859–1938)	30 March 1926	4 June 1927	1 year, 66 days	PP	1926	Averescu III	Ferdinand I (1914–1927)
30		Barbu Știrbey (1873–1946)	4 June 1927	20 June 1927	16 days	Ind.	—	Știrbey	Ferdinand I (1914–1927)
(22)		Ion I. C. Brătianu (1864–1927)	21 June 1927	24 November 1927	156 days	PNL	—	I.I.C. Brătianu VII	Ferdinand I (1914–1927)
(22)		Ion I. C. Brătianu (1864–1927)	21 June 1927	24 November 1927	156 days	PNL	1927	I.I.C. Brătianu VII	Michael I (1927–1930)
31		Vintilă Brătianu (1867–1930)	24 November 1927	9 November 1928	351 days	PNL	—	V. Brătianu	Michael I (1927–1930)
32		Iuliu Maniu (1873–1953)	10 November 1928	6 June 1930	1 year, 208 days	PNȚ	—	Maniu I	Michael I (1927–1930)
32		Iuliu Maniu (1873–1953)	10 November 1928	6 June 1930	1 year, 208 days	PNȚ	1928	Maniu I	Michael I (1927–1930)
33		Gheorghe Mironescu (1874–1949)	7 June 1930	12 June 1930	5 days	PNȚ	—	Mironescu I	Carol II (1930–1940)
(32)		Iuliu Maniu (1873–1953)	13 June 1930	9 October 1930	118 days	PNȚ	—	Maniu II	Carol II (1930–1940)
(33)		Gheorghe Mironescu (1874–1949)	10 October 1930	17 April 1931	189 days	PNȚ	—	Mironescu II	Carol II (1930–1940)
34		Nicolae Iorga (1871–1940)	19 April 1931	6 June 1932	1 year, 48 days	PND	—	Iorga	Carol II (1930–1940)
34		Nicolae Iorga (1871–1940)	19 April 1931	6 June 1932	1 year, 48 days	PND	1931	Iorga	Carol II (1930–1940)
(28)		Alexandru Vaida-Voevod (1872–1950)	6 June 1932	19 October 1932	135 days	PNȚ	—	Vaida-Voevod II	Carol II (1930–1940)
(28)		Alexandru Vaida-Voevod (1872–1950)	6 June 1932	19 October 1932	135 days	PNȚ	1932	Vaida-Voevod II	Carol II (1930–1940)
(28)		Alexandru Vaida-Voevod (1872–1950)	6 June 1932	19 October 1932	135 days	PNȚ	—	Vaida-Voevod III	Carol II (1930–1940)
(32)		Iuliu Maniu (1873–1953)	20 October 1932	13 January 1933	85 days	PNȚ	—	Maniu III	Carol II (1930–1940)
(28)		Alexandru Vaida-Voevod (1872–1950)	14 January 1933	13 November 1933	303 days	PNȚ	—	Vaida-Voevod IV	Carol II (1930–1940)
35		Ion G. Duca (1879–1933)	14 November 1933	30 December 1933 X	46 days	PNL	—	Duca	Carol II (1930–1940)
35		Ion G. Duca (1879–1933)	14 November 1933	30 December 1933 X	46 days	PNL	1933	Duca	Carol II (1930–1940)
—		Constantin Angelescu (1870–1948) acting	30 December 1933	3 January 1934	4 days	PNL	—	Angelescu	Carol II (1930–1940)
36		Gheorghe Tătărescu (1886–1957)	3 January 1934	28 December 1937	3 years, 359 days	PNL	—	Tătărescu I	Carol II (1930–1940)
36		Gheorghe Tătărescu (1886–1957)	3 January 1934	28 December 1937	3 years, 359 days	PNL	—	Tătărăscu II	Carol II (1930–1940)
36		Gheorghe Tătărescu (1886–1957)	3 January 1934	28 December 1937	3 years, 359 days	PNL	—	Tătărăscu III	Carol II (1930–1940)
36		Gheorghe Tătărescu (1886–1957)	3 January 1934	28 December 1937	3 years, 359 days	PNL	—	Tătărăscu IV	Carol II (1930–1940)
37		Octavian Goga (1881–1938)	28 December 1937	10 February 1938	44 days	PNC	1937	Goga	Carol II (1930–1940)
38		Patriarch; Miron Cristea (1868–1939)	11 February 1938	6 March 1939 #	1 year, 23 days	FRN	—	Cristea I	Carol II (1930–1940)
38		Patriarch; Miron Cristea (1868–1939)	11 February 1938	6 March 1939 #	1 year, 23 days	FRN	—	Cristea II	Carol II (1930–1940)
38		Patriarch; Miron Cristea (1868–1939)	11 February 1938	6 March 1939 #	1 year, 23 days	FRN	—	Cristea III	Carol II (1930–1940)
39		Armand Călinescu (1893–1939)	7 March 1939	21 September 1939 X	198 days	FRN	—	Călinescu	Carol II (1930–1940)
39		Armand Călinescu (1893–1939)	7 March 1939	21 September 1939 X	198 days	FRN	1939	Călinescu	Carol II (1930–1940)
40		Gheorghe Argeșanu (1883–1940)	21 September 1939	28 September 1939	7 days	Mil.	—	Argeșanu	Carol II (1930–1940)
41		Constantin Argetoianu (1871–1955)	28 September 1939	23 November 1939	56 days	FRN	—	Argetoianu	Carol II (1930–1940)
(36)		Gheorghe Tătărescu (1886–1957)	25 November 1939	4 July 1940	222 days	FRN	—	Tătărescu V	Carol II (1930–1940)
(36)		Gheorghe Tătărescu (1886–1957)	25 November 1939	4 July 1940	222 days	FRN	—	Tătărescu VI	Carol II (1930–1940)
42		Ion Gigurtu (1886–1959)	4 July 1940	5 September 1940	63 days	PN	—	Gigurtu	Carol II (1930–1940)
43		Ion Antonescu (Note: From 14 September 1940, the Prime Minister title was styled Conducător for as long as Marshal Ion Antonescu remained in power as head of the Romanian government.) (1882–1946)	5 September 1940	23 August 1944	3 years, 353 days	Mil.	—	Antonescu I	Michael I (1940–1947)
43		Ion Antonescu (1882–1946)	5 September 1940	23 August 1944	3 years, 353 days	Mil.	—	Antonescu II	Michael I (1940–1947)
43		Ion Antonescu (1882–1946)	5 September 1940	23 August 1944	3 years, 353 days	Mil.	—	Antonescu III	Michael I (1940–1947)
44		Constantin Sănătescu (1885–1947)	23 August 1944	5 December 1944	104 days	Mil.	—	Sănătescu I	Michael I (1940–1947)
44		Constantin Sănătescu (1885–1947)	23 August 1944	5 December 1944	104 days	Mil.	—	Sănătescu II	Michael I (1940–1947)
45		Nicolae Rădescu (1874–1953)	7 December 1944	1 March 1945	84 days	Mil.	—	Rădescu	Michael I (1940–1947)
46		Petru Groza (1884–1958)	6 March 1945	30 December 1947	2 years, 299 days	FP	—	Groza I	Michael I (1940–1947)
46		Petru Groza (1884–1958)	6 March 1945	30 December 1947	2 years, 299 days	FP	1946	Groza II	Michael I (1940–1947)

=== Romanian People's Republic (1947–1965) / Socialist Republic of Romania (1965–1989) ===
No.	Portrait	Name (Birth–Death)	Term of office			Political party	Elected	Cabinet	Head of state (Term)
No.	Portrait	Name (Birth–Death)	Took office	Left office	Time in office	Political party	Elected	Cabinet	Head of state (Term)
Presidents of the Council of Ministers (informally Prime Ministers) (1947–1989)
46		Petru Groza (1884–1958)	30 December 1947	2 June 1952	4 years, 155 days	FP	—	Groza III	C. I. Parhon (Note: President of the Provisional Presidium of the Republic (1947–1948); President of the Presidium of the Great National Assembly (1948–1952)) (1947–1952)
46		Petru Groza (1884–1958)	30 December 1947	2 June 1952	4 years, 155 days	FP	1948	Groza IV	C. I. Parhon (1947–1952)
47		Gheorghe Gheorghiu-Dej (1901–1965)	2 June 1952	4 October 1955	3 years, 124 days	PMR	—	Gheorghiu-Dej I	Petru Groza (Note: President of the Presidium of the Great National Assembly) (1952–1958)
47		Gheorghe Gheorghiu-Dej (1901–1965)	2 June 1952	4 October 1955	3 years, 124 days	PMR	1952	Gheorghiu-Dej I	Petru Groza (1952–1958)
47		Gheorghe Gheorghiu-Dej (1901–1965)	2 June 1952	4 October 1955	3 years, 124 days	PMR	—	Gheorghiu-Dej II	Petru Groza (1952–1958)
48		Chivu Stoica (1908–1975)	4 October 1955	20 March 1961	5 years, 167 days	PMR	—	Stoica I	Petru Groza (1952–1958)
48		Chivu Stoica (1908–1975)	4 October 1955	20 March 1961	5 years, 167 days	PMR	1957	Stoica II	Ion Gheorghe Maurer (1958–1961)
49		Ion Gheorghe Maurer (1902–2000)	21 March 1961	28 March 1974	13 years, 7 days	PCR	1961	Maurer I	Gheorghe Gheorghiu-Dej (Note: President of the State Council) (1961–1965)
49		Ion Gheorghe Maurer (1902–2000)	21 March 1961	28 March 1974	13 years, 7 days	PCR	1965	Maurer II	Chivu Stoica (1965–1967)
49		Ion Gheorghe Maurer (1902–2000)	21 March 1961	28 March 1974	13 years, 7 days	PCR	—	Maurer III	Chivu Stoica (1965–1967)
49		Ion Gheorghe Maurer (1902–2000)	21 March 1961	28 March 1974	13 years, 7 days	PCR	—	Maurer IV	Nicolae Ceaușescu (Note: President of the State Council (1967–1974); President of Romania (1974–1989)) (1967–1989)
49		Ion Gheorghe Maurer (1902–2000)	21 March 1961	28 March 1974	13 years, 7 days	PCR	1969	Maurer V	Nicolae Ceaușescu (1967–1989)
50		Manea Mănescu (1916–2009)	28 March 1974	30 March 1979	5 years, 2 days	PCR	—	Mănescu I	Nicolae Ceaușescu (1967–1989)
50		Manea Mănescu (1916–2009)	28 March 1974	30 March 1979	5 years, 2 days	PCR	1975	Mănescu II	Nicolae Ceaușescu (1967–1989)
51		Ilie Verdeț (1925–2001)	30 March 1979	20 May 1982	3 years, 51 days	PCR	—	Verdeț I	Nicolae Ceaușescu (1967–1989)
51		Ilie Verdeț (1925–2001)	30 March 1979	20 May 1982	3 years, 51 days	PCR	1980	Verdeț II	Nicolae Ceaușescu (1967–1989)
52		Constantin Dăscălescu (1923–2003)	21 May 1982	22 December 1989 (Deposed)	7 years, 215 days	PCR	—	Dăscălescu I	Nicolae Ceaușescu (1967–1989)
52		Constantin Dăscălescu (1923–2003)	21 May 1982	22 December 1989 (Deposed)	7 years, 215 days	PCR	1985	Dăscălescu II	Nicolae Ceaușescu (1967–1989)

=== Romania (1989–present) ===
No.	Portrait	Name (Birth–Death)	Term of office			Political party	Elected	Cabinet (composition)	President (Term)
No.	Portrait	Name (Birth–Death)	Took office	Left office	Time in office	Political party	Elected	Cabinet (composition)	President (Term)
Prime Ministers (since 1989)
—		Council of the National Salvation Front de facto	22 December 1989	26 December 1989	4 days	FSN	—	Provisional	Itself (1989)
—		Petre Roman (born 1946)	26 December 1989	28 June 1990	1 year, 294 days	FSN	—	Roman I FSN	Ion Iliescu (1989–1996) (Note: Acting President until 20 June 1990.)
53		Petre Roman (born 1946)	28 June 1990	16 October 1991	1 year, 294 days	FSN	1990	Roman II FSN	Ion Iliescu (1989–1996)
53		Petre Roman (born 1946)	28 June 1990	16 October 1991	1 year, 294 days	FSN	—	Roman III FSN	Ion Iliescu (1989–1996)
54		Theodor Stolojan (born 1943)	16 October 1991	19 November 1992	1 year, 34 days	Ind.	—	Stolojan FSN–PNL–MER–PDAR	Ion Iliescu (1989–1996)
55		Nicolae Văcăroiu (born 1943)	19 November 1992	11 December 1996	4 years, 22 days	PSDR	1992	Văcăroiu FDSN→PSDR (Note: From 10 July 1993.)–PUNR	Ion Iliescu (1989–1996)
56		Victor Ciorbea (born 1954)	12 December 1996	30 March 1998	1 year, 108 days	PNȚCD	1996	Ciorbea CDR-USD-UDMR/RMDSZ	Emil Constantinescu (1996–2000)
—		Gavril Dejeu (born 1932) acting	30 March 1998	17 April 1998	18 days	PNȚCD	—	Ciorbea CDR-USD-UDMR/RMDSZ	Emil Constantinescu (1996–2000)
57		Radu Vasile (1942–2013)	17 April 1998	13 December 1999	1 year, 240 days	PNȚCD	—	Vasile CDR-USD-UDMR/RMDSZ	Emil Constantinescu (1996–2000)
—		Alexandru Athanasiu (born 1955) acting	13 December 1999	22 December 1999	9 days	PSDR	—	Vasile CDR-USD-UDMR/RMDSZ	Emil Constantinescu (1996–2000)
58		Mugur Isărescu (born 1949)	22 December 1999	28 December 2000	1 year, 6 days	Ind. (Note: Yet somewhat affiliated with the Romanian Democratic Convention (CDR) as he was later on the official presidential candidate of the revamped CDR 2000 in the 2000 Romanian general election.)	—	Isărescu CDR-USD-UDMR/RMDSZ	Emil Constantinescu (1996–2000)
59		Adrian Năstase (born 1950)	28 December 2000	21 December 2004	3 years, 359 days	PSD	2000	Năstase (PSDR–PDSR)→PSD (Note: PSDR and PDSR merged into the PSD on 16 June 2001.)–PUR	Ion Iliescu (2000–2004)
—		Eugen Bejinariu (born 1959) acting	21 December 2004	28 December 2004	7 days	PSD	—	Năstase (PSDR–PDSR)→PSD–PUR	Traian Băsescu (2004–2014) (Note: Suspended in 2007 for 33 day (replaced by Nicolae Văcăroiu as acting president) and in 2012 for 48 days (replaced by Crin Antonescu as acting president).)
60		Călin Popescu-Tăriceanu (born 1952)	29 December 2004	22 December 2008	3 years, 359 days	PNL	2004	Tăriceanu I PNL–PD–PUR/PC (Note: Until 4 December 2006.)–UDMR/RMDSZ	Traian Băsescu (2004–2014)
60		Călin Popescu-Tăriceanu (born 1952)	29 December 2004	22 December 2008	3 years, 359 days	PNL	—	Tăriceanu II PNL–UDMR/RMDSZ	Traian Băsescu (2004–2014)
61		Emil Boc (born 1966)	22 December 2008	6 February 2012	3 years, 46 days	PDL	2008	Boc I PD-L–PSD	Traian Băsescu (2004–2014)
61		Emil Boc (born 1966)	22 December 2008	6 February 2012	3 years, 46 days	PDL	—	Boc II PDL–UDMR/RMDSZ–UNPR	Traian Băsescu (2004–2014)
—		Cătălin Predoiu (born 1968) acting	6 February 2012	9 February 2012	3 days	Ind.	—	Boc II PDL–UDMR/RMDSZ–UNPR	Traian Băsescu (2004–2014)
62		Mihai Răzvan Ungureanu (born 1968)	9 February 2012	7 May 2012	88 days	Ind.	—	Ungureanu PDL–UDMR/RMDSZ–UNPR	Traian Băsescu (2004–2014)
63		Victor Ponta (born 1972)	7 May 2012	22 June 2015	3 years, 46 days	PSD	—	Ponta I USL (PNL–PSD–PC)	Traian Băsescu (2004–2014)
63		Victor Ponta (born 1972)	7 May 2012	22 June 2015	3 years, 46 days	PSD	2012	Ponta II USL (PNL–PSD–PC–UNPR)	Traian Băsescu (2004–2014)
63		Victor Ponta (born 1972)	7 May 2012	22 June 2015	3 years, 46 days	PSD	—	Ponta III PSD–UNPR–PC–PLR–UDMR/RMDSZ	Traian Băsescu (2004–2014)
63		Victor Ponta (born 1972)	7 May 2012	22 June 2015	3 years, 46 days	PSD	—	Ponta IV PSD–UNPR–ALDE	Klaus Iohannis (2014–2025)
—		Gabriel Oprea (born 1961) acting	22 June 2015	9 July 2015	17 days	UNPR	—	Ponta IV PSD–UNPR–ALDE	Klaus Iohannis (2014–2025)
(63)		Victor Ponta (born 1972)	9 July 2015	29 July 2015	20 days	PSD	—	Ponta IV PSD–UNPR–ALDE	Klaus Iohannis (2014–2025)
—		Gabriel Oprea (born 1961) acting	29 July 2015	10 August 2015	12 days	UNPR	—	Ponta IV PSD–UNPR–ALDE	Klaus Iohannis (2014–2025)
(63)		Victor Ponta (born 1972)	10 August 2015	5 November 2015	87 days	PSD	—	Ponta IV PSD–UNPR–ALDE	Klaus Iohannis (2014–2025)
—		Sorin Cîmpeanu (born 1968) acting	5 November 2015	17 November 2015	12 days	ALDE	—	Ponta IV PSD–UNPR–ALDE	Klaus Iohannis (2014–2025)
64		Dacian Cioloș (born 1969)	17 November 2015	4 January 2017	1 year, 48 days	Ind.	—	Cioloș Technocratic	Klaus Iohannis (2014–2025)
65		Sorin Grindeanu (born 1973)	4 January 2017	29 June 2017	176 days	PSD	2016	Grindeanu PSD–ALDE	Klaus Iohannis (2014–2025)
66		Mihai Tudose (born 1967)	29 June 2017	16 January 2018	201 days	PSD	—	Tudose PSD–ALDE	Klaus Iohannis (2014–2025)
—		Mihai Fifor (born 1970) acting	16 January 2018	29 January 2018	13 days	PSD	—	Tudose PSD–ALDE	Klaus Iohannis (2014–2025)
67		Viorica Dăncilă (born 1963)	29 January 2018	4 November 2019	1 year, 279 days	PSD	—	Dăncilă PSD–ALDE (Note: Until 27 August 2019.)	Klaus Iohannis (2014–2025)
68		Ludovic Orban (born 1963)	4 November 2019	7 December 2020	1 year, 33 days	PNL	—	Orban I PNL	Klaus Iohannis (2014–2025)
68		Ludovic Orban (born 1963)	4 November 2019	7 December 2020	1 year, 33 days	PNL	—	Orban II PNL	Klaus Iohannis (2014–2025)
—		Nicolae Ciucă (born 1967) acting	7 December 2020	23 December 2020	16 days	PNL	—	Orban II PNL	Klaus Iohannis (2014–2025)
69		Florin Cîțu (born 1972)	23 December 2020	25 November 2021	337 days	PNL	2020	Cîțu PNL–USR PLUS (Note: Until 7 September 2021.)–UDMR/RMDSZ	Klaus Iohannis (2014–2025)
70		Nicolae Ciucă (born 1967)	25 November 2021	12 June 2023	1 year, 199 days	PNL	—	Ciucă CNR (PSD–PNL–UDMR/RMDSZ)	Klaus Iohannis (2014–2025)
—		Cătălin Predoiu (born 1968) acting	12 June 2023	15 June 2023	3 days	PNL	—	Ciucă CNR (PSD–PNL–UDMR/RMDSZ)	Klaus Iohannis (2014–2025)
71		Marcel Ciolacu (born 1967)	15 June 2023	6 May 2025	1 year, 325 days	PSD	—	Ciolacu I CNR (PSD–PNL)	Klaus Iohannis (2014–2025)
71		Marcel Ciolacu (born 1967)	15 June 2023	6 May 2025	1 year, 325 days	PSD	2024	Ciolacu II PSD–PNL–UDMR/RMDSZ	Ilie Bolojan (2025) (Note: Acting President from 12 February to 26 May.)
—		Cătălin Predoiu (born 1968) acting	6 May 2025	23 June 2025	48 days	PNL	—	Ciolacu II PSD–PNL–UDMR/RMDSZ	Ilie Bolojan (2025)
—		Cătălin Predoiu (born 1968) acting	6 May 2025	23 June 2025	48 days	PNL	—	Ciolacu II PSD–PNL–UDMR/RMDSZ	Nicușor Dan (2025–present)
72		Ilie Bolojan (born 1969)	23 June 2025	20 October 2026	1 year, 119 days	PNL	—	Bolojan PSD (Note: Until 25 April 2026.)–PNL–USR–UDMR/RMDSZ	Nicușor Dan (2025–present)
73		Luca Niculescu (born 1971)	20 October 2026	Incumbent	14 days	Ind.	—	Niculescu PSD	Nicușor Dan (2025–present)

Note: Romania used the Julian calendar prior to April 1919, so all dates before that are given in the Julian calendar; all dates after that are given in the Gregorian calendar.

== See also ==
- Prime Minister of Romania
  - List of heads of government of Romania by time in office
- List of heads of state of Romania
- President of Romania
  - List of presidents of Romania
  - List of presidents of Romania by time in office

== Bibliography ==
- Nicolae C. Nicolescu, Șefii de stat și de guvern ai României (1859–2003), Editura Meronia, Bucharest, 2003
- Stelian Neagoe, Istoria guvernelor României de la începuturi – 1859 până în zilele noastre – 1995, Editura Machiavelli, Bucharest, 1995
