= Second Ion Ghica cabinet =

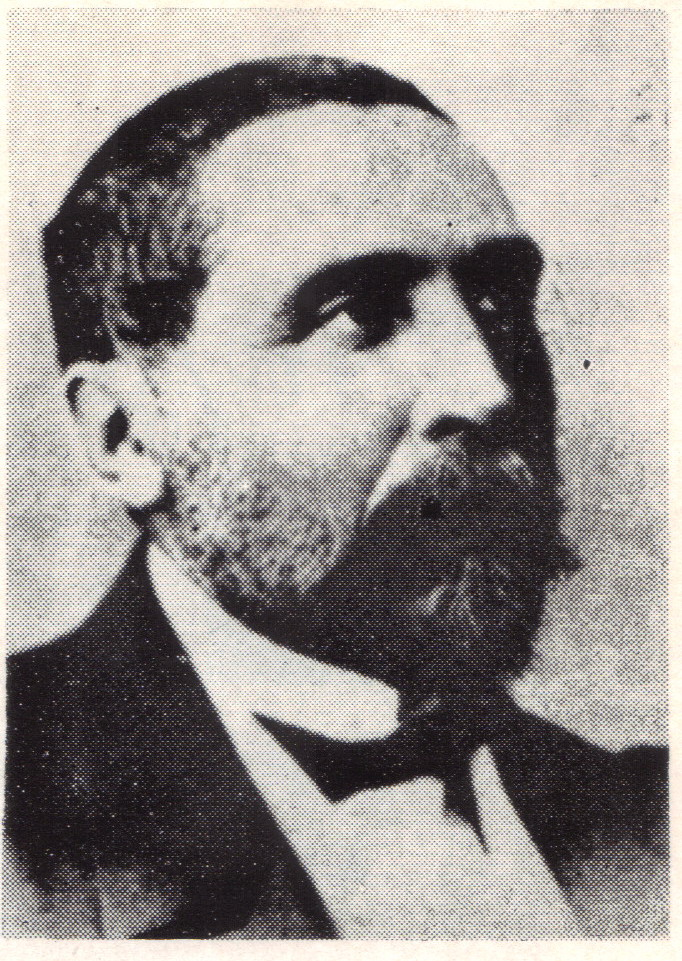
Ion Ghica

The second cabinet of Ion Ghica was the government of Romania from 15 July 1866 to 21 February 1867.

== Composition ==
The ministers of the cabinet were as follows:

- President of the Council of Ministers:

- Ion Ghica (15 July 1866 – 21 February 1867)

- Minister of the Interior:

- Ion Ghica (15 July 1866 – 21 February 1867)

- Minister of Foreign Affairs:

- George Barbu Știrbei (15 July 1866 – 21 February 1867)

- Minister of Finance:

- Petre Mavrogheni (15 July 1866 – 21 February 1867)

- Minister of Justice:

- Ion C. Cantacuzino (15 July 1866 – 21 February 1867)

- Minister of War:

- Col. Ioan Grigore Ghica (15 July – 6 August 1866)
- Col. Nicolae Haralambie (6 August 1866 – 8 February 1867)
- Gen. Tobias Gherghely (8–21 February 1867)

- Minister of Religious Affairs:

- C. A. Rosetti (15–19 July 1866)
- Ion Strat (19 July 1866 – 21 February 1867)

- Minister of Public Works:

- Dimitrie Sturdza (15 July 1866 – 21 February 1867)

Preceded by First Lascăr Catargiu cabinet	Cabinet of Romania; 15 July 1866 – 21 February 1867	Succeeded by Constantin A. Kretzulescu cabinet
