= Third Ion C. Brătianu cabinet =

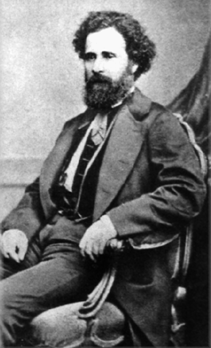
Ion C. Brătianu

The third cabinet of Ion C. Brătianu ruled Romania from 11 July 1879 to 9 April 1881.

== Composition ==
The ministers of the cabinet were as follows:

- President of the Council of Ministers:

- Ion C. Brătianu (11 July 1879 - 9 April 1881)

- Minister of the Interior:

- Mihail Kogălniceanu (11 July 1879 - 17 April 1880)
- (interim) Ion C. Brătianu (17 April - 15 July 1880)
- (interim) Anastase Stolojan (15 - 20 July 1880)
- Alexandru Teriachiu (20 July 1880 - 9 April 1881)

- Minister of Foreign Affairs:

- Vasile Boerescu (11 July 1879 - 9 April 1881)

- Minister of Finance:

- Dimitrie Sturdza (11 July 1879 - 16 February 1880)
- (interim) Ion C. Brătianu (16 - 25 February 1880)
- Ion I. Câmpineanu (25 February - 15 July 1880)
- (interim) Ion C. Brătianu (15 July - 24 October 1880)
- Ion C. Brătianu (24 October 1880 - 9 April 1881)

- Minister of Justice:

- Anastase Stolojan (11 July 1879 - 29 July 1880)
- Dimitrie Gianni (29 July 1880 - 9 April 1881)

- Minister of War:

- Col. Dimitrie Lecca (11 July 1879 - 29 April 1880)
- Gen. Gheorghe Slăniceanu (29 April 1880 - 9 April 1881)

- Minister of Religious Affairs and Public Instruction:

- Nicolae Kretzulescu (11 July 1879 - 22 January 1880)
- (interim) Vasile Boerescu (22 January - 20 July 1880)
- Vasile Conta (20 July 1880 - 9 April 1881)

- Minister of Public Works:

- Ion C. Brătianu (11 July 1879 - 24 October 1880)
- Col. Nicolae Dabija (24 October 1880 - 9 April 1881)

| Preceded by Second Ion C. Brătianu cabinet | Cabinet of Romania; 11 July 1879 - 9 April 1881 | Succeeded by Dimitrie Brătianu cabinet |
