= First Lascăr Catargiu cabinet =

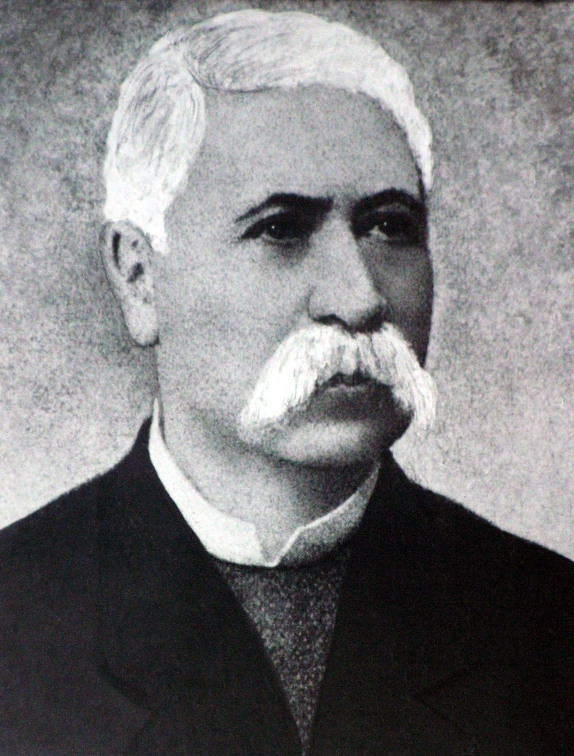
Lascăr Catargiu

The first cabinet of Lascăr Catargiu was the government of Romania from 11 May to 13 July 1866.

== Composition ==
The ministers of the cabinet were as follows:

- President of the Council of Ministers:

- Lascăr Catargiu (11 May – 13 July 1866)

- Minister of the Interior:

- Lascăr Catargiu (11 May – 13 July 1866)

- Minister of Foreign Affairs:

- Petre Mavrogheni (11 May – 13 July 1866)

- Minister of Finance:

- Ion C. Brătianu (11 May – 13 July 1866)

- Minister of Justice:

- Ion C. Cantacuzino (11 May – 13 July 1866)

- Minister of War:

- Gen. Ioan Grigore Ghica (11 May – 13 July 1866)

- Minister of Religious Affairs and Public Instruction:

- C. A. Rosetti (11 May – 13 July 1866)

- Minister of Public Works:

- Dimitrie Sturdza (11 May – 13 July 1866)

Preceded by First Ion Ghica cabinet	Cabinet of Romania; 11 May 1866 – 13 July 1866	Succeeded by Second Ion Ghica cabinet
