= I. C. Brătianu (disambiguation) =

I. C. Brătianu may refer to:

- Ion C. Brătianu, a Romanian politician
- I. C. Brătianu, Tulcea, a commune in Tulcea County, Romania
- Ion Brătianu National College (Pitești) in Pitești, Romania
