= Dimitrie Brătianu cabinet =

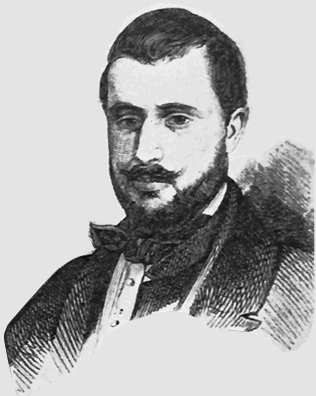
Dimitrie Brătianu

The cabinet of Dimitrie Brătianu ruled Romania from 10 April to 8 June 1881.

== Composition ==
The ministers of the cabinet were as follows:

- President of the Council of Ministers:

- Dimitrie Brătianu (10 April – 8 June, 1881)

- Minister of the Interior:

- Eugeniu Stătescu (10 April – 8 June, 1881)

- Minister of Foreign Affairs:

- Dimitrie Brătianu (10 April – 8 June, 1881)

- Minister of Finance:

- Col. Nicolae Dabija (10 April – 28 April 1881)
- Dimitrie Sturdza (28 April – 8 June 1881)

- Minister of Justice:

- Mihail Pherekyde (10 April – 8 June, 1881)

- Minister of War:

- Gen. Gheorghe Slăniceanu (10 April – 8 June, 1881)

- Minister of Religious Affairs and Public Instruction:

- V. A. Urechia (10 April – 8 June, 1881)

- Minister of Public Works:

- Col. Nicolae Dabija (10 April – 8 June, 1881)

Preceded by Third Ion C. Brătianu cabinet	Cabinet of Romania; 10 April 1881 - 8 June 1881	Succeeded by Fourth Ion C. Brătianu cabinet
