= First Ion Ghica cabinet =

Government of Romania in 1866

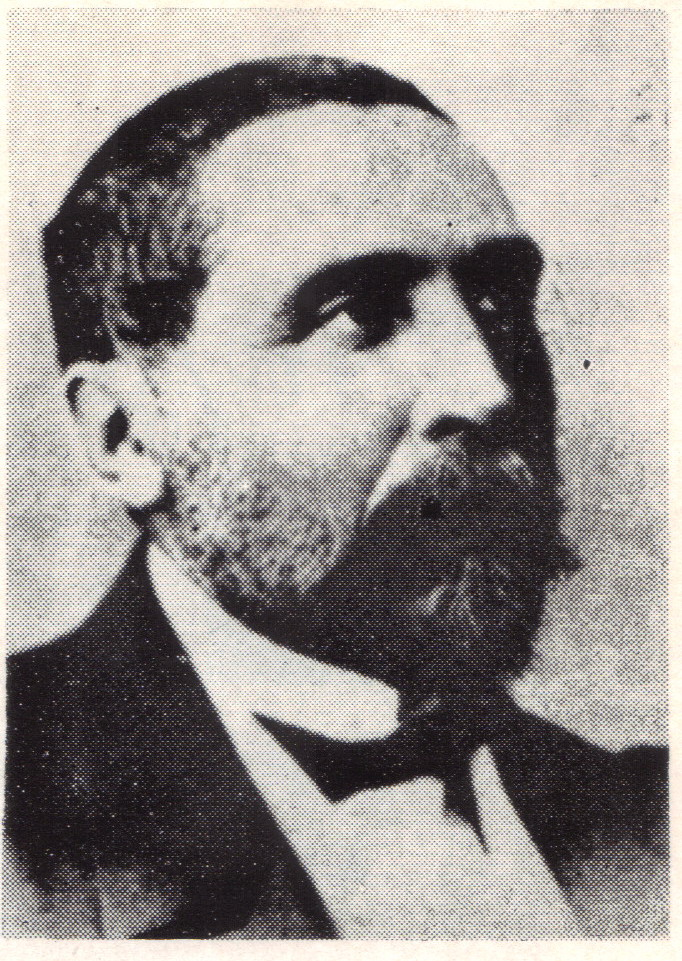
Ion Ghica

The first cabinet of Ion Ghica was the government of Romania from 11 February to 10 May 1866.

== Composition ==
The ministers of the cabinet were as follows:

- President of the Council of Ministers:

- Ion Ghica (11 February - 10 May 1866)

- Minister of the Interior:

- Dimitrie Ghica (11 February - 10 May 1866)

- Minister of Foreign Affairs:

- Ion Ghica (11 February - 10 May 1866)

- Minister of Finance:

- (interim) Dimitrie Sturdza (11 - 16 February 1866)
- Petre Mavrogheni (16 February - 10 May 1866)

- Minister of Justice:

- Ion C. Cantacuzino (11 February - 10 May 1866)

- Minister of War:

- Maj. Dimitrie Lecca (11 February - 10 May 1866)

- Minister of Religious Affairs:

- C. A. Rosetti (11 February - 10 May 1866)

- Minister of Public Works:

- Dimitrie Sturdza (11 February - 10 May 1866)

Preceded by Second Nicolae Kretzulescu cabinet	Cabinet of Romania; 11 February 1866 - 10 May 1866	Succeeded by First Lascăr Catargiu cabinet
