= 23 August (disambiguation) =

23 August is a day of the Gregorian calendar.

23 August may also refer to:

- King Michael's Coup, in Romania, which took place on 23 August 1944

== Places in Romania ==
- 23 August, Constanța, a commune
- 23 August, a village in Zăvoi, Caraş-Severin
- 23 August, a village in Malovăț, Mehedinţi
- I. C. Brătianu, Tulcea, a commune known as 23 August until 1996

== Other uses ==
- 23 August Works, now part of FAUR S.A., a Romanian industrial engineering and manufacturing company
