= Second Ion C. Brătianu cabinet =

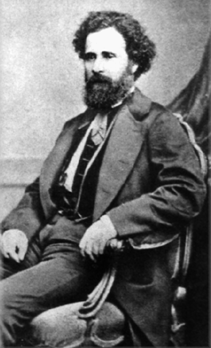
Ion C. Brătianu

The second cabinet of Ion C. Brătianu ruled Romania from 25 November 1878 to 10 July 1879.

== Composition ==
The ministers of the cabinet were as follows:

- President of the Council of Ministers:

- Ion C. Brătianu (25 November 1878 – 10 July 1879)

- Minister of the Interior:

- Ion C. Brătianu (25 November 1878 – 10 July 1879)

- Minister of Foreign Affairs:

- Ion I. Câmpineanu (25 November 1878 – 10 July 1879)

- Minister of Finance:

- Dimitrie Sturdza (25 November 1878 – 10 July 1879)

- Minister of Justice:

- Eugeniu Stătescu (25 November 1878 – 10 July 1879)

- Minister of War:

- (interim) Ion C. Brătianu (25 November 1878 – 8 January 1879)
- Col. Nicolae Dabija (8 January 1879 – 10 July 1879)

- Minister of Religious Affairs and Public Instruction:

- George Cantilli (25 November 1878 – 10 July 1879)

- Minister of Public Works:

- Mihail Pherekyde (25 November 1878 – 10 July 1879)

Preceded by First Ion C. Brătianu cabinet	Cabinet of Romania; 25 November 1878 - 10 July 1879	Succeeded by Third Ion C. Brătianu cabinet
