= First Ion C. Brătianu cabinet =

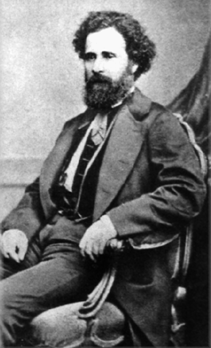
Ion C. Brătianu

The first cabinet of Ion C. Brătianu ruled Romania from 24 July 1876 to 24 November 1878.

== Composition ==
The ministers of the cabinet were as follows:

- President of the Council of Ministers:

- Ion C. Brătianu (24 July 1876 – 24 November 1878)

- Minister of the Interior:

- George Vernescu (24 July 1876 - 27 January 1877)
- Ion C. Brătianu (27 January 1877 - 26 March 1878)
- C. A. Rosetti (26 March - 17 November 1878)
- (interim) Mihail Kogălniceanu (17 - 24 November 1878)

- Minister of Foreign Affairs:

- Nicolae Ionescu (24 July 1876 - 25 March 1877)
- (interim) Ion I. Câmpineanu (25 March - 3 April 1877)
- Mihail Kogălniceanu (3 April 1877 - 24 November 1878)

- Minister of Finance:

- Ion C. Brătianu (24 July 1876 - 27 January 1877)
- Dimitrie Sturdza (27 January - 21 February 1877)
- (interim) Ion C. Brătianu (21 February - 20 August 1877)
- (interim) Ion I. Câmpineanu (20 August - 23 September 1877)
- Ion I. Câmpineanu (23 September 1877 - 24 November 1878)

- Minister of Justice:

- Eugeniu Stătescu (24 July 1876 - 27 January 1877)
- Ion I. Câmpineanu (27 January - 23 September 1877)
- Eugeniu Stătescu (23 September 1877 - 24 November 1878)

- Minister of War:

- Col. Gheorghe Slăniceanu (24 July 1876 - 2 April 1877)
- Col. Alexandru Cernat (2 April - 20 August 1877)
- (interim) Ion C. Brătianu (20 August 1877 - 17 March 1878)
- Gen. Alexandru Cernat (17 March - 24 November 1878)

- Minister of Religious Affairs and Public Instruction:

- Gheorghe Chițu (24 July 1876 - 31 October 1878)
- (interim) Ion C. Brătianu (31 October - 24 November 1878)

- Minister of Public Works:

- Dimitrie Sturdza (24 July 1876 - 5 January 1877)
- (interim) George Vernescu (5 - 27 January 1877)
- Ioan Docan (27 January - 21 August 1877)
- Petre S. Aurelian (21 August 1877 - 26 March 1878)
- (interim) Ion C. Brătianu (26 March 1878 - 24 November 1878)

Preceded by Second Epureanu cabinet	Cabinet of Romania; 24 July 1876 - 24 November 1878	Succeeded by Second Ion C. Brătianu cabinet
