= Ștefan Golescu cabinet =

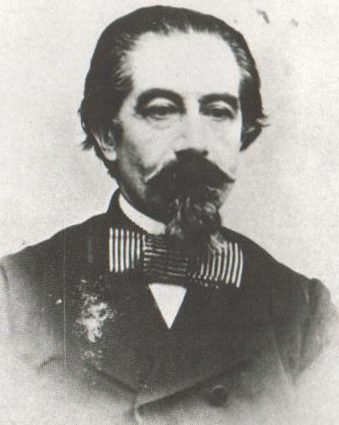
Ștefan Golescu

The cabinet of Ștefan Golescu was the government of Romania from 17 August 1867 to 29 April 1868.

== Composition ==
The ministers of the cabinet were as follows:

- President of the Council of Ministers:

- Ștefan Golescu (17 August 1867 – 29 April 1868)

- Minister of the Interior:

- Ștefan Golescu (17 August 1867 – 13 November 1867)
- Ion C. Brătianu (13 November 1867 – 29 April 1868)

- Minister of Foreign Affairs:

- Alexandru Teriachiu (17 August 1867 – 1 November 1867)
- (interim) Ștefan Golescu (1 - 13 November 1867)
- Ștefan Golescu (13 November 1867 – 29 April 1868)

- Minister of Finance:

- Ludovic Steege (17 August 1867 – 1 October 1867)
- (interim) Grigore Arghiropol (1 – 27 October 1867)
- Ion C. Brătianu (27 October – 13 November 1867)
- (interim) Ion C. Brătianu (13 November 1867 – 29 April 1868)

- Minister of Justice:

- Anton I. Arion (17 – 29 August 1867)
- Grigore Arghiropol (29 August – 13 November 1867)
- Anton I. Arion (13 November 1867 – 29 April 1868)

- Minister of War:

- Col. Gheorghe Adrian (17 August 1867 – 29 April 1868)

- Minister of Religious Affairs:

- Dimitrie Gusti (17 August 1867 – 29 April 1868)

- Minister of Public Works:

- Dimitrie Brătianu (17 August 1867 – 13 November 1867)
- Panait Donici (13 November 1867 – 29 April 1868)

Preceded by Constantin A. Kretzulescu cabinet	Cabinet of Romania; 17 August 1867 – 29 April 1868	Succeeded by Nicolae Golescu cabinet
