= Nicolae Golescu cabinet =

Government of Romania in 1868

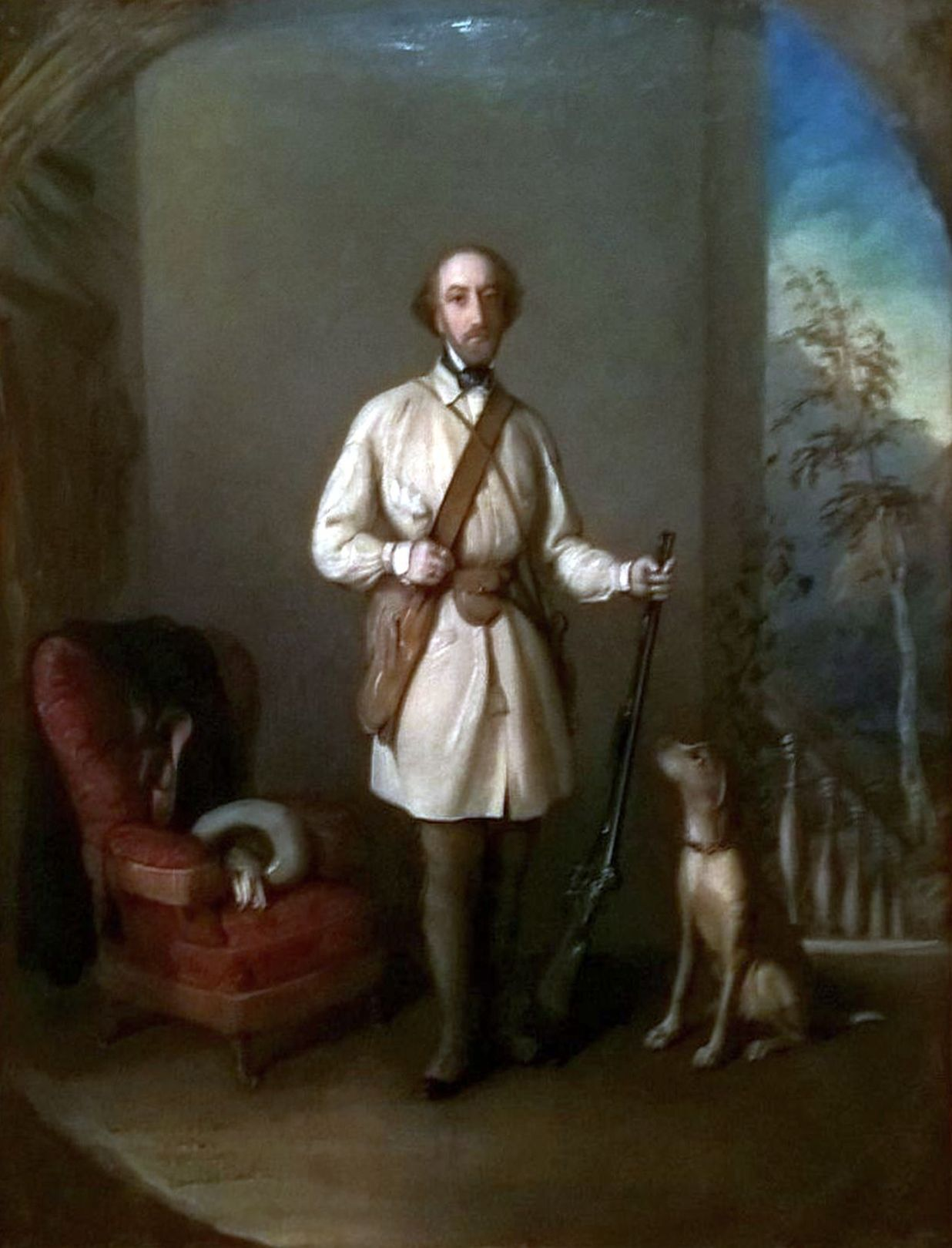
Portrait of Nicolae Golescu by Constantin Daniel Rosenthal

The cabinet of Nicolae Golescu was the government of Romania from 1 May to 15 November 1868.

== Composition ==
The ministers of the cabinet were as follows:

- President of the Council of Ministers:

- Nicolae Golescu (1 May - 15 November 1868)

- Minister of the Interior:

- Ion C. Brătianu (1 May - 12 August 1868)
- (interim) Anton I. Arion (12 August - 2 November 1868)
- Anton I. Arion (2 - 15 November 1868)

- Minister of Foreign Affairs:

- Nicolae Golescu (1 May - 15 November 1868)

- Minister of Finance:

- (interim) Ion C. Brătianu (1 May - 12 August 1868)
- Ion C. Brătianu (12 August - 15 November 1868)

- Minister of Justice:

- Anton I. Arion (1 May - 2 November 1868)
- Constantin Eraclide (2 - 15 November 1868)

- Minister of War:

- Col. Gheorghe Adrian (1 May - 12 August 1868)
- (interim) Ion C. Brătianu (12 August - 15 November 1868)

- Minister of Religious Affairs and Public Instruction:

- Dimitrie Gusti (1 May - 15 November 1868)

- Minister of Public Works:

- Panait Donici (1 May - 15 November 1868)

Preceded by Ștefan Golescu cabinet	Cabinet of Romania; 1 May 1868 - 15 November 1868	Succeeded by Dimitrie Ghica cabinet
