= Constantin A. Kretzulescu cabinet =

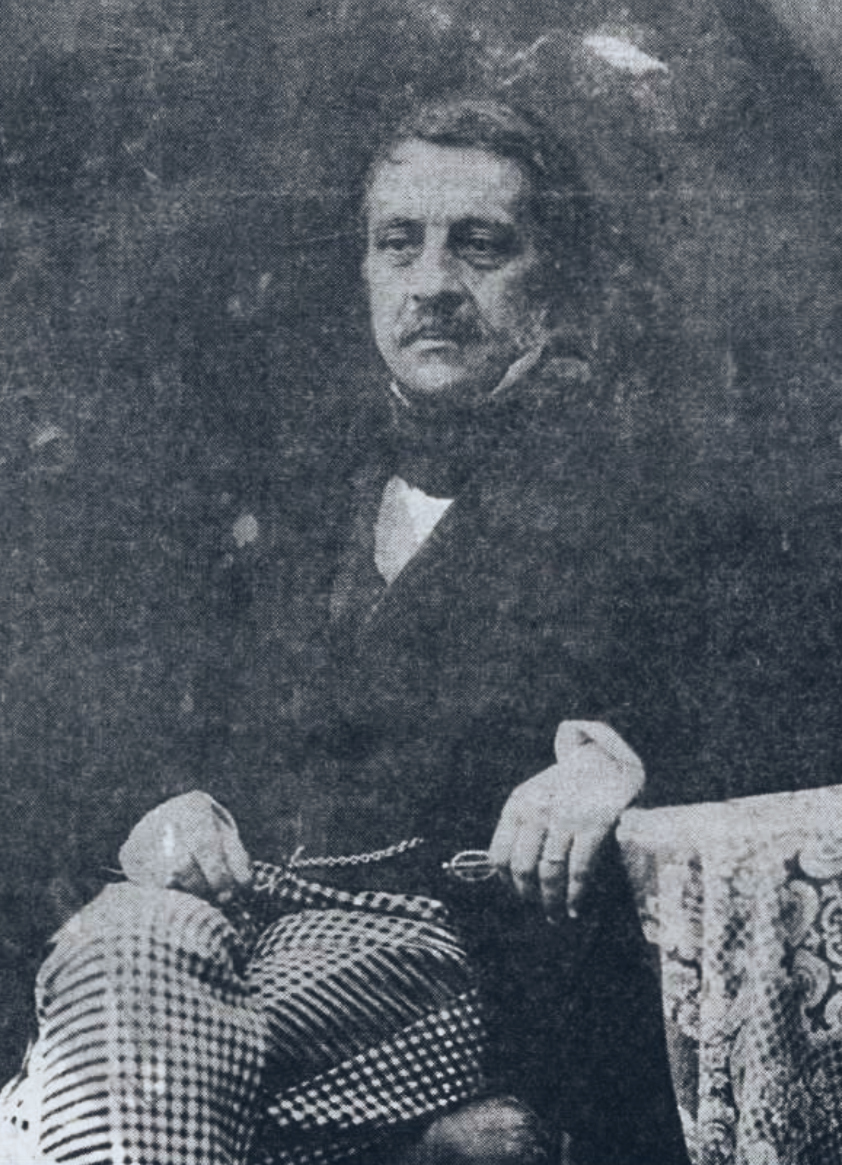
Constantin A. Kretzulescu

The cabinet of Constantin A. Kretzulescu was the government of Romania from 1 March to 5 August 1867.

== Composition ==
The ministers of the cabinet were as follows:

- President of the Council of Ministers:

- Constantin A. Kretzulescu (1 March – 5 August 1867)

- Minister of the Interior:

- Ion C. Brătianu (1 March – 5 August 1867)

- Minister of Foreign Affairs:

- Ștefan Golescu (1 March – 5 August 1867)

- Minister of Finance:

- Alexandru Văsescu (1 March – 5 August 1867)

- Minister of Justice:

- Constantin A. Kretzulescu (1 March – 5 August 1867)

- Minister of War:

- Col. Tobias Gherghely (1 March – 24 May 1867)
- Col. Gheorghe Adrian (24 May – 5 August 1867)

- Minister of Religious Affairs:

- Dimitrie Brătianu (1 March – 5 August 1867)

- Minister of Public Works:

- (interim) Dimitrie Brătianu (1 March – 5 August 1867)

Preceded by Second Ion Ghica cabinet	Cabinet of Romania; 1 March 1867 – 5 August 1867	Succeeded by Ștefan Golescu cabinet
