= Nicolae Dabija (general) =

Romanian general

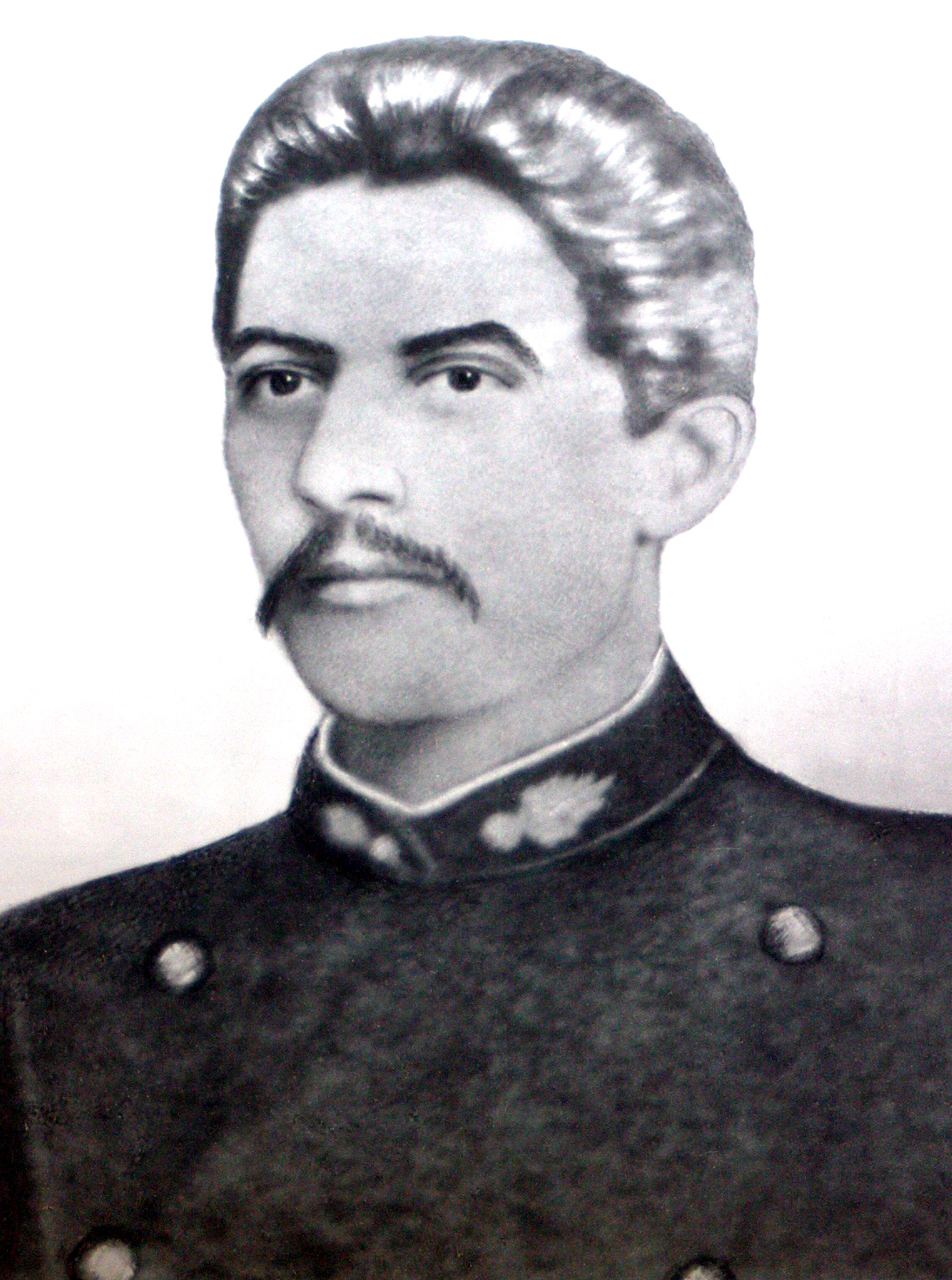
- Born: August 15, 1837; Huși, Vaslui County, Moldavia
- Died: 1 December 1884 (aged 47); Paris, France
- Education: Academia Mihăileană; School of Applied Artillery
- Military career
- Allegiance: Romania
- Branch: Army
- Rank: Brigadier general
- Conflicts: Romanian War of Independence

17th Minister of War
- In office 8 January 1879 – 10 July 1879
- Prime Minister: Ion Brătianu
- Preceded by: Alexandru Cernat
- Succeeded by: Dimitrie Lecca

Minister of Finance
- In office 10 April 1881 – 11 April 1881
- Prime Minister: Dimitrie Brătianu
- Preceded by: Ion C. Brătianu
- Succeeded by: Dimitrie Sturdza

Minister of Public Works
- In office 24 October 1880 – 9 April 1881
- Prime Minister: Ion Brătianu

Nicolae Dabija (15 August 1837, Huși. Vaslui County, Moldavia – 1 December 1884, Paris) was a Romanian general and politician.

Born in Huși, in 1837, he attended the Academia Mihăileană in Iași. In 1858 he was sent to France to attend the School of Applied Artillery in Metz. After graduation, he returned to Romania, joining the army, initially with the artillery.

His military career advanced, and in 1864 he was appointed subdirector of the artillery. He participated in the Romanian War of Independence (1877–1878), as commander of the Infantry Division Artillery, taking part in the battles of the Romanian Army at Plevna and Vidin.

After the war, Col. Nicolae Dabija entered politics, being attracted by the liberal doctrine. He held several political and administrative functions in the governments that governed Romania after 1878: Minister of War (18 January – 10 July 1879), interim Minister of Finance (10–27 April 1881) and Minister of Public Works several times (24 October 1880 – 9 April 1881, 10 April – 8 June 1881, 9 June 1881 – 31 July 1884).

The English company "Danube and Black Sea Railway Kustenge Harbor" built between 1856 and 1862 the Constanța-Cernavodă railway through Dobrogea. Per the Treaty of Berlin (1878), Dobrogea was given to Romania, the English company requested the redemption of the railway by the Romanian state, demanding 18,752,706 golden lei. Dabija, as representative of the Romanian state, and the delegate of the English company signed on 9 November 1882, the repurchase agreement for the sum of 16,800,000 lei, ratified on 21 May 1882 by the Assembly of Deputies, and paid in a lump sum in 1882.

In 1883 Nicolae Dabija was promoted to the rank of Brigadier General. He died only one year later (1 December 1884) in Paris, aged 47.
