= Gabriel-Beniamin Leș =

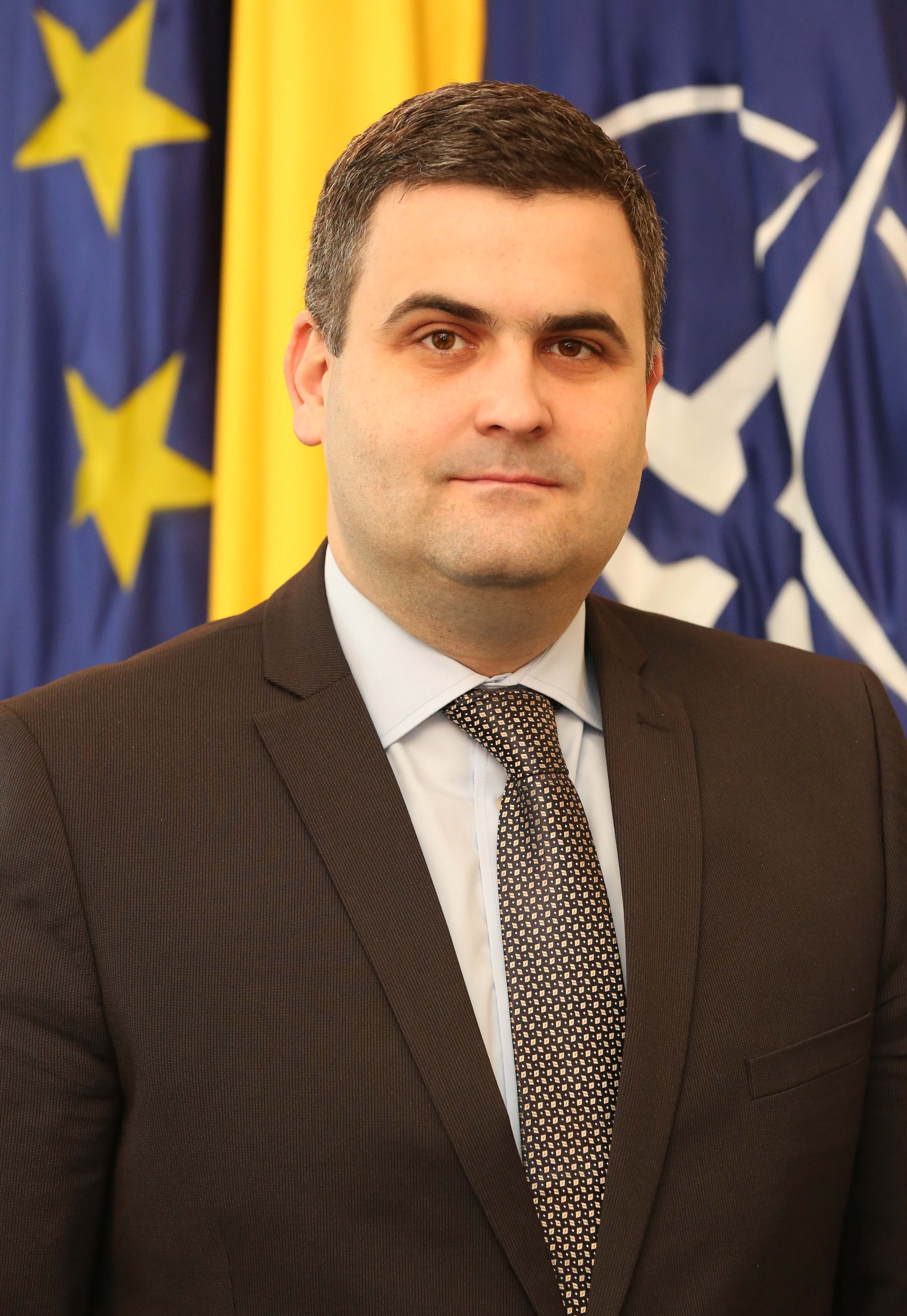
Official portrait.

Gabriel-Beniamin Leș (born December 23, 1975, Satu Mare, Satu Mare County) is a Romanian military, political and government figure who was Minister of National Defense from 2018 to 2019.

== Biography ==
He was born on December 23, 1975 in Satu Mare, Satu Mare County. He graduated from the Faculty of Marketing at West University of Timișoara in 2002. In 2004, he graduated from the Vasile Goldiș Western University of Arad, specializing in accounting. Since 1994, he has worked as a designer, and in 2000, he became the economic director of a company in his hometown. In 2003, he became a member of the Social Democratic Party of Romania.

From 2004 to 2008, he served as Deputy Mayor of Satu Mare, and in 2009, he became Deputy Prefect (government representative) of Satu Mare County. He later became the executive director of the agency's branch dealing with payments and interventions in the agricultural market. From October 2015 to October 2016, he served as State Secretary for Armaments of the Romanian Ministry of National Defence. In the 2016 Romanian parliamentary election, he was elected to the Senate of Romania for Satu Mare Constituency No. 32.

On January 5, 2017, he assumed his duties as Minister of National Defense in the Grindeanu Cabinet, a position he held until June 29, 2017. He returned to this position in November 2018 in the Dăncilă Cabinet (until 4 November 2019).
