= Nicolae Haralambie =

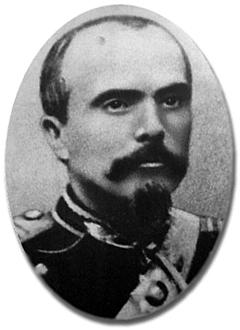
Nicolae Haralambie

Nicolae Haralambie (August 27, 1835 in Bucharest – April 3, 1908 in Bucharest) was a Romanian soldier and politician.

In 1861, he headed the Bucharest police. As a colonel, he took part in the dethronement of Prince Alexandru Ioan Cuza in 1866, subsequently serving in a regency alongside Lascăr Catargiu and Nicolae Golescu.

He served as War Minister from August 6, 1866, to February 7, 1867.

On July 7, 1874, together with Ion Ghica and a third person, Haralambie performed a flight over Bucharest in a hydrogen balloon named "Mihai Bravul".

He returned to the Romanian Army in 1877, taking part in the War of Independence as a brigadier general, and fighting with distinction at the battles of Smârdan and Vidin. Elected senator in 1879, Haralambie joined a coalition that took down the Ion Brătianu government.
