= Second Epureanu cabinet =

19th-century Romanian government

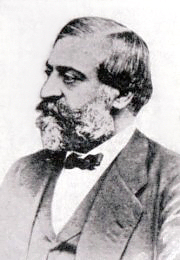
Manolache Costache Epureanu

The second cabinet of Manolache Costache Epureanu was the government of Romania from 27 April to 23 July 1876.

== Composition ==
The ministers of the cabinet were as follows:

- President of the Council of Ministers:

- Manolache Costache Epureanu (27 April - 23 July 1876)

- Minister of the Interior:

- George Vernescu (27 April - 23 July 1876)

- Minister of Foreign Affairs:

- Mihail Kogălniceanu (27 April - 23 July 1876)

- Minister of Finance:

- Ion C. Brătianu (27 April - 23 July 1876)

- Minister of Justice:

- Mihail Pherekyde (27 April - 23 July 1876)

- Minister of War:

- Col. Gheorghe Slăniceanu (27 April - 23 July 1876)

- Minister of Religious Affairs and Public Instruction:

- Gheorghe Chițu (27 April - 23 July 1876)

- Minister of Public Works:

- Manolache Costache Epureanu (27 April - 23 July 1876)

Preceded by First Florescu cabinet	Cabinet of Romania; 27 April 1876 - 23 July 1876	Succeeded by First Ion C. Brătianu cabinet
