= Alexandru Cernat =

Romanian general

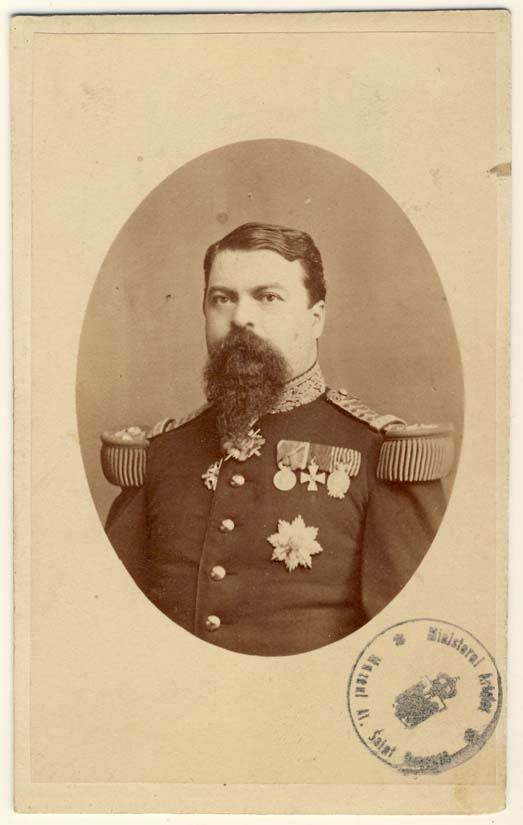
- General Alexandru Cernat
- Born: 17 January 1828; Galați or Vârlezi, Principality of Moldavia
- Died: 8 December 1893 (aged 65); Bucharest, Kingdom of Romania
- Burial place: Bellu Cemetery, Bucharest
- Military career
- Allegiance: Principality of Moldavia; United Principalities; Romania
- Branch: Moldavian Army; Romanian Land Forces
- Service years: 1851–1891
- Rank: Brigadier general (1873); Major general (1877)
- Commands: 5th Infantry Regiment; 4th Territorial Division; 2nd Army Corps
- Conflicts: Romanian War of Independence
- Awards: Honorific Sign, silver Honorific Sign, golden Military Virtue Medal, 1st class Order of the Star of Romania, Grand Officer class Order of St. George, 4th class Order of Saint Anna, 2nd class

16th Minister of War of the United Principalities
- In office 2 April 1877 – 19 August 1877
- Prime Minister: Ion Brătianu
- Preceded by: Gheorghe Slăniceanu
- Succeeded by: himself
- In office 19 March 1878 – 24 November 1878
- Prime Minister: Ion Brătianu
- Succeeded by: Nicolae Dabija

Chief of the Romanian General Staff
- In office 1881–1882
- Prime Minister: Ion Brătianu
- Preceded by: Gheorghe Slăniceanu
- Succeeded by: Gheorghe Slăniceanu

Alexandru Cernat (17 January 1828 – 8 December 1893) was a Romanian general and politician.

He was born in either Galați, or in nearby Vârlezi according to other sources, the son of Eustațiu and Teodosia Cernat. After attending elementary school in Galați, he enrolled in the military school in Iași. Upon graduation he entered the Moldavian Army in 1851 as a cadet, advancing in rank to second lieutenant (1852), lieutenant (1855), captain (1857).

After the personal union of Moldavia and Wallachia in 1859 he joined the Romanian Army.

He was promoted then promoted as major (1860), lieutenant colonel (1863), colonel (1866).

In 1869 he was awarded the silver 'Honorific Sign' for 18 years of continuous military service.

He was then promoted as brigadier general in 1873. Also in 1873, Cernat was given command of the 4th Territorial Division, with headquarters in Iași.

During this time he contributed to the creation of rules for the training of military units.

In 1876 he was awarded the golden 'Honorific Sign' for 25 years of uninterrupted service in the army.

In April 1877, he was named minister of war, serving until August, when he was made commander of operations during the Romanian War of Independence.

During this time he made sure that the mobilization of the Romanian Army was carried out in good conditions and in good time. Cernat insured that the quality of the equipment would be improved, that portable weapons, cannons and ammunition would be provided, and sped up the instruction of reserves. In order that the Russian Army would be protected and that any Ottoman incursions north of the Danube would be pushed back, he contributed to the organization of troops to cover the southern border Romania.

Cernat personally led the units in successful battle at Griviţa No. 1 Redoubt. As a reward for his skilfulness as a commander, the Tsar of Russia, Alexander II awarded him with the Order of St. George 4th class. He then led the assault against the Ottoman troops stationed at Griviţa No. 2 Redoubt, as well as other actions around Plevna, Bucov, Opanez, Etropole and the fortress of Oryahovo. At Plevna, he supported the successful strategy and carrying out of encircling the troops of Osman Nuri Pasha. Osman was then forced to capitulate. For the skilful way he carried out his duty on the battlefield, he was awarded the Military Virtue Medal 1st class.

On the 5th of December 1877 Cernat was promoted to major general. He received the task of coordinating the Romanian troops on both banks of the Danube in order to eliminate the last pockets of Ottoman resistance around the fortress of Vidin.

Following the end of hostilities, he was again minister of war from February to November 1878. He resigned following disagreements with the government of the day and domnitor Carol I, and, upon his own request, took command of the 2nd Infantry Division. From 1881 to 1882, he was Chief of the Romanian General Staff. From 1882 to 1883 Cernat was the director of the National Military Circle. He commanded the 2nd Army Corps from March 1883 to December 1891, when he retired from the military after 40 years of service.

During his career, he received numerous awards, including the Military Virtue Medal 1st class (1877), the Order of the Star of Romania Grand Officer class, the Order of St. George 4th class (1877), and the Order of Saint Anna, 2nd class.

Cernat worked for the National Liberal Party, being elected as MP and senator in 1864–1888. He was deputy-president of the Senate in several sessions.

Cernat died on 8 December 1893 in Bucharest, and was buried at Bellu Cemetery in Bucharest, his headstone being designed by the sculptor Ioan Georgescu.

Streets in Bucharest, Galați, Iași, and Sibiu bear his name.
