= Petre Mavrogheni =

Romanian politician

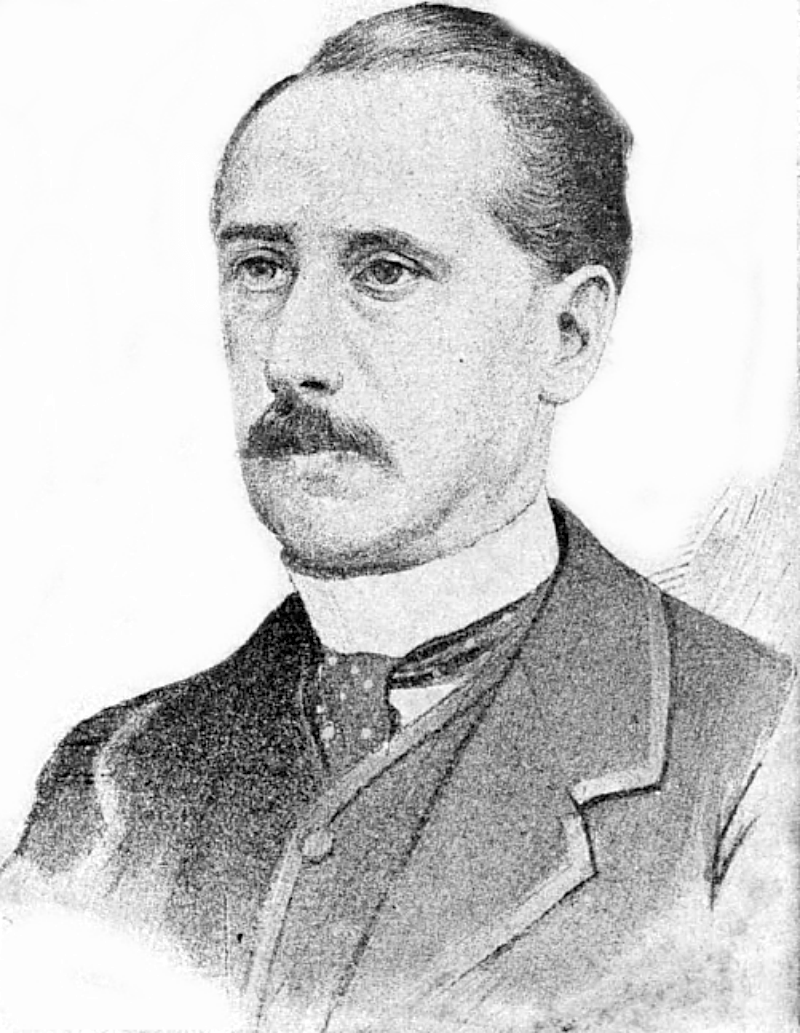

Minister of Foreign Affairs
- In office 11 May 1866 – 13 July 1866
- Monarchs: Alexandru Ioan Cuza; Carol I of Romania
- Prime Minister: Lascăr Catargiu
- Preceded by: Ion Ghica
- Succeeded by: George Barbu Știrbei

Minister of Finance of Principality of Romania
- In office 16 February 1866 – 10 May 1866
- Prime Minister: Ion Ghica
- Preceded by: Dimitrie Sturdza
- Succeeded by: Ion C. Brătianu
- In office 15 July 1866 – 21 February 1867
- Prime Minister: Ion Ghica
- Preceded by: Ion C. Brătianu
- Succeeded by: Alexandru Văsescu
- In office 11 March 1871 – 7 January 1875
- Prime Minister: Lascăr Catargiu
- Preceded by: Dimitrie Sturdza
- Succeeded by: Gheorghe Grigore Cantacuzino

Personal details
- Born: November , 1819 Iași, Moldavia
- Died: April 20, 1887 (aged 67–68) Vienna, Austria-Hungary
- Spouse: Olga Mavrogheni

Petre Mavrogheni (November 1819 – 20 April 1887) also known as Petru Mavrogheni was a Romanian politician who served as the Minister of Foreign Affairs from 11 May until 13 July 1866 and as the Minister of Finance.

== Life and career ==
Petre was born in Iași, Moldavia in 1819 into noble Mavrogheni family. He was a conservative politician who started his career as prefect of Galați in 1849. He then served as the Minister of Finance of Principality of Moldavia in 1861, after which he held the office of Minister of Finance of Romania, serving three terms from 16 February 1866 to 10 May 1866, from 15 July 1866 to 21 February 1867, and from 11 March 1871 to 7 January 1875. He also held the office of Minister of Foreign Affairs from 11 May until 13 July 1866. Mavrogheni was then the Ambassador of Romania to Italy in 1881–1882, to the Ottoman Empire in 1882–1885, and to Austria-Hungary in 1885–1887.

In 1855, Mavrogheni along with Mihail Kogălniceanu drafted a bill for legislation which would abolish the slavery of the Roma minority in Moldavia. On 22 December 1855 the law was voted on and slavery was abolished.
