= Isărescu cabinet =

Isărescu I
- 114th Cabinet of Romania

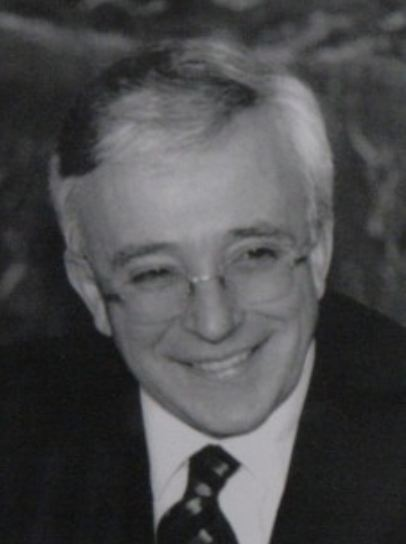
- Mugur Isărescu, circa 1999
- Date formed: 22 December 1999
- Date dissolved: 28 December 2000

People and organisations
- Head of state: Emil Constantinescu
- Head of government: Mugur Isărescu
- Member party: PNȚ-CD, PNL, PD, UDMR
- Status in legislature: Majority
- Opposition party: PDSR, PRM
- Opposition leader: Ion Iliescu, Corneliu Vadim Tudor

History
- Election: -
- Outgoing election: 26 November 2000
- Legislature term: 1996–2000
- Budget: One
- Predecessor: Vasile
- Successor: Năstase

The Isărescu Cabinet was the 114th cabinet of Romania, incumbent between 22 December 1999 and 28 December 2000. It was led by Mugur Isărescu. It was a coalition cabinet formed between the winner of the elections, CDR (Convenția Democrată Română, the Romanian Democratic Convention, which included PNȚCD, PNL, PER), USD (Uniunea Social Democrată, the Social Democratic Union, which included PD and PSDR), and UDMR.

== Members ==
Coalition members: PNȚ-CD, PD, PNL, UDMR, and Independent ministers

Office	Name	Party	Period
Prime Minister	Mugur Isărescu	Independent	22 December 1999 – 28 December 2000
Minister of State	Mircea Ciumara	PNȚ-CD	22 December 1999 – 28 December 2000
Minister of State, Minister of Justice	Valeriu Stoica	PNL	22 December 1999 – 28 December 2000
Minister of State, Minister of Health	Gábor Hajdú	UDMR	22 December 1999 – 28 December 2000
Minister of State, Minister of Foreign Affairs	Petre Roman	PD	22 December 1999 – 28 December 2000
Minister of National Defense	Victor Babiuc	PD	22 December 1999 – 13 March 2000
Minister of National Defense	Sorin Frunzăverde	PD	13 March 2000 – 28 December 2000
Minister of Finance	Decebal Traian Remeș	PNȚ-CD	22 December 1999 – 28 December 2000
Minister of Culture	Ion Caramitru	PNȚ-CD	22 December 1999 – 28 December 2000
Minister of Public Works	Nicolae Noica	PNȚ-CD	22 December 1999 – 28 December 2000
Minister of Agriculture	Ioan Avram Mureșan	PNȚ-CD	22 December 1999 – 28 December 2000
Minister of Industry and Commerce	Radu Berceanu	PD	22 December 1999 – 28 December 2000
Minister of Labor	Smaranda Dobrescu	PD	22 December 1999 – 28 December 2000
Minister of Environment	Romică Tomescu	PNȚ-CD	22 December 1999 – 28 December 2000
Minister of Transport	Traian Băsescu	PD	22 December 1999 – 26 June 2000
Minister of Transport	Anca Boagiu	PD	26 June 2000 – 28 December 2000
Minister of Interior	Constantin Dudu Ionescu	PNȚ-CD	22 December 1999 – 28 December 2000
Minister of Education	Andrei Marga	PNȚ-CD	22 December 1999 – 28 December 2000
Minister of Public Office	Vlad Roșca	PNȚ-CD	22 December 1999 – 28 December 2000
Minister of Youth and Sport	Crin Antonescu	PNL	22 December 1999 – 28 December 2000
Sources: Appointments on 22 December 1999, appointments on 13 March 2000, appointments on 26 June 2000, and end of terms on 28 December 2000
