= Eugeniu Stătescu =

Romanian politician

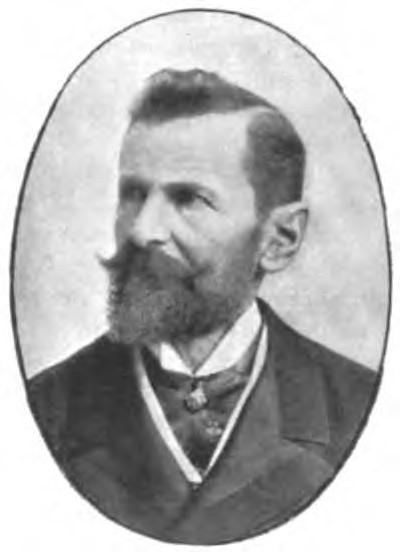

Minister of Internal Affairs
- In office 10 April 1881 – 8 June 1881
- Monarch: Carol I of Romania

Minister of Foreign Affairs
- In office 9 June 1881 – 30 July 1881
- Monarch: Carol I of Romania
- Preceded by: Dimitrie C. Brătianu
- Succeeded by: Dimitrie A. Sturdza

Personal details
- Born: 25 December 1836 Bucharest, Wallachia
- Died: 30 December 1905 (aged 69) Bucharest, Kingdom of Romania
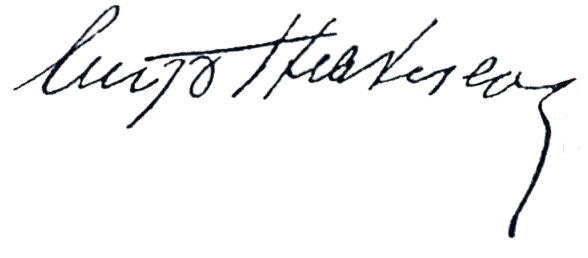
- Signature

Eugeniu Stătescu (25 December [O.S. 13 December] 1836 – 30 December [O.S. 18 December] 1905) was a Romanian politician. He was a close associate of prime minister Ion C. Brătianu and one of the founders of the National Liberal Party in the country. Stătescu held several positions in the Romanian government between 1876 and 1902, including:

- Minister of Justice
- Minister of Foreign Affairs
- Minister of Internal Affairs
- President of the Senate

He was one of the signatories of the Act of Proclamation of the Kingdom of Romania signed by King Carol I and Queen Elisaveta.

== See also ==
- Foreign relations of Romania
