= Dimitrie Ghica cabinet =

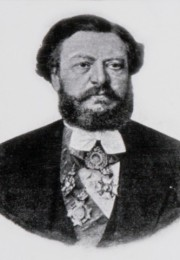
Dimitrie Ghica

The cabinet of Dimitrie Ghica was the government of Romania from 16 November 1868 to 27 January 1870.

== Composition ==
The ministers of the cabinet were as follows:

- President of the Council of Ministers:

- Dimitrie Ghica (16 November 1868 - 27 January 1870)

- Minister of the Interior:

- Mihail Kogălniceanu (16 November 1868 - 24 January 1870)
- Dimitrie Ghica (24 - 27 January 1870)

- Minister of Foreign Affairs:

- Dimitrie Ghica (16 November 1868 - 26 August 1869)
- (interim) Mihail Kogălniceanu (26 August - 28 November 1869)
- Nicolae Calimachi-Catargiu (28 November 1869 - 27 January 1870)

- Minister of Finance:

- Alexandru G. Golescu (16 November 1868 - 27 January 1870)

- Minister of Justice:

- Vasile Boerescu (16 November 1868 - 21 January 1870)
- (interim) Dimitrie Ghica (21 - 24 January 1870)
- Gheorghe Grigore Cantacuzino (24 - 27 January 1870)

- Minister of War:

- Col. Alexandru Duca (16 November 1868 - 14 July 1869)
- Col. George Manu (14 July 1869 - 27 January 1870)

- Minister of Religious Affairs and Public Instruction:

- Alexandru Papadopol-Calimah (16 - 24 November 1868)
- Alexandru Crețescu (24 November 1868 - 12 December 1869)
- George Mârzescu (12 December 1869 - 27 January 1870)

- Minister of Public Works:

- (interim) Dimitrie Ghica (16 November 1868 - 26 August 1869)
- Dimitrie Ghica (26 August 1869 - 27 January 1870)

Preceded by Nicolae Golescu cabinet	Cabinet of Romania; 16 November 1868 - 27 January 1870	Succeeded by Alexandru G. Golescu cabinet
