= I. C. Brătianu, Tulcea =

I. C. Brătianu
- Commune
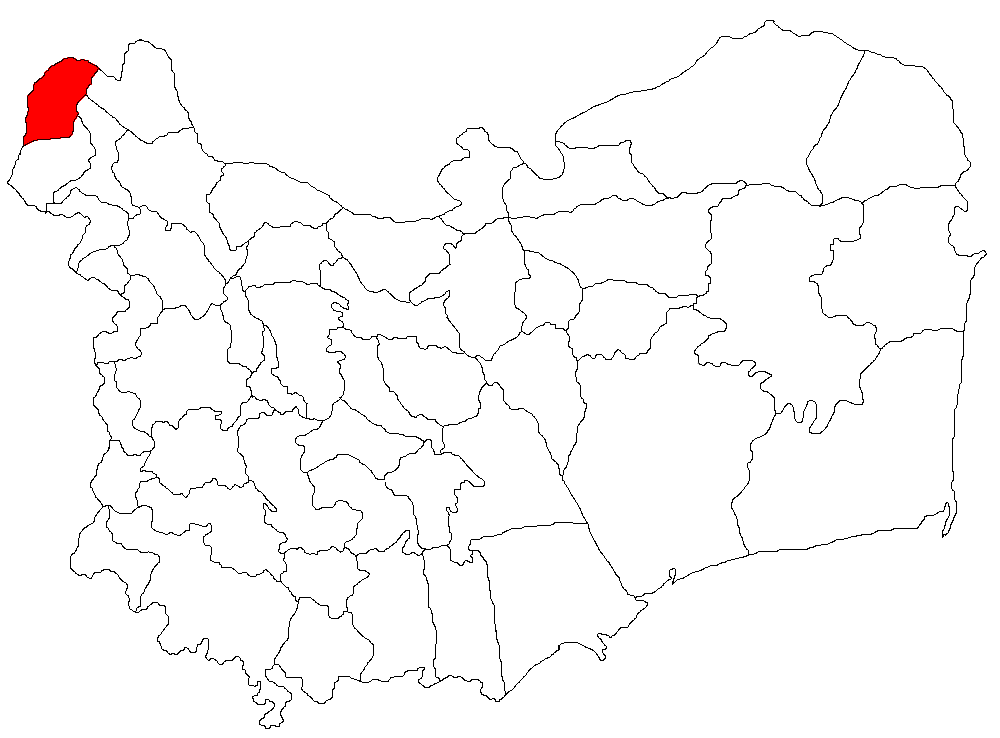
- Location in Tulcea County

- Location in Romania
- Coordinates: 45°22′34″N 28°4′39″E
- Country: Romania
- County: Tulcea

Government
  - Mayor (2020–2024): Iordan Alexe (PNL)
- Area: 48.77 km^{2} (18.83 sq mi)
- Population (2021-12-01): 1,143
  - Density: 23/km^{2} (61/sq mi)
- Time zone: EET/EEST (UTC+2/+3)
- Postal code: 827205
- Vehicle reg.: TL
- Website: www.icbratianu.ro

I. C. Brătianu (Azaclău or Zaclău until 1907; I. C. Brătianu from 1907 to 1944; 23 August during the Communist era and until 1996) is a commune in Tulcea County, Northern Dobruja, Romania. It is composed of a single village, I. C. Brătianu. It was named after Ion C. Brătianu, Prime Minister of Romania.
