= Anton I. Arion =

Romanian politician

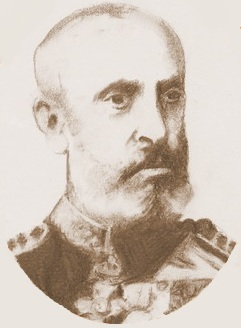
Anton I. Arion

Anton I. Arion (1824–1897) was a Romanian politician who served as the Minister of Interior (12 August 1868 – 16 November 1868) and Minister of Justice (19–29 August 1867 and 13 November 1867 – 29 April 1868).

He was born the son of clucer of Ioniță Arion, former president of the Bucharest Tribunal, and his wife, Ana Merișan. In 1849, he married Elisa Sofia Slătineanu Lupoianu.
