= Ion C. Cantacuzino (politician) =

Romanian politician

Ion C. Cantacuzino (also, Ioan C. Cantacuzino; 12 September 1825 – 20 April 1878) was a Romanian politician and Minister of Justice.

Of Wallachian origins, Cantacuzino was born in Iași, Moldavia in 1825, the son of Constantin Canacuzino and Zoe Slătineanu, thus a nephew of Ion Ghica. The Cantacuzino family were prominent in both Danubian Principalities and after the union of Moldavia with Wallachia, in Romania. After studying in Paris, he returned to the country where he achieved rose in prominence: initially as head of the French Department of the Ministry of Foreign Affairs, then in the judiciary, where he became President of the Court of Appeal in Bucharest, in 1858.

He was involved in Wallachia politics, being a member of the Ad hoc Divans following the election of 1857, and of the Elective Assembly of January 1859. After United Principalities were formed, he served as minister in several governments (of justice and of religious affairs and public instruction) and chairman of the Court of Cassation. He died in Vienna in 1878.
