= Dimitrie Lecca =

Romanian politician (1832–1888)

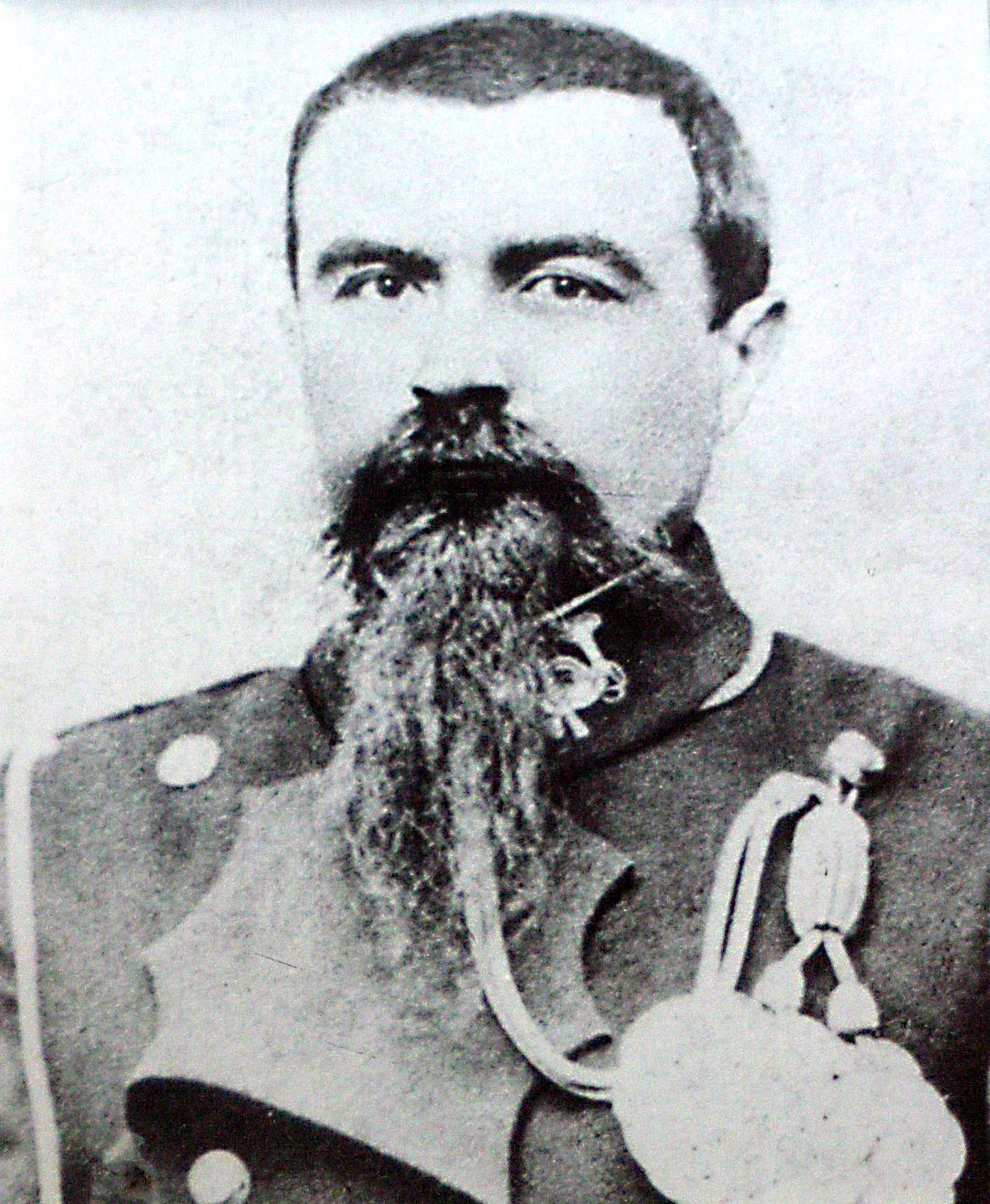
Dimitrie Lecca as major

Dimitrie Lecca (2 December 1832–4 July 1888) was a Moldavian-born Romanian officer and politician.

== Biography ==
Born in Tecuci, he was the son of paharnic (royal cup-bearer) Gheorghe Lecca (said to be a descendant of Leca of Cătun) and of Maria Negură; he had a sister, Ruxandra, and two brothers, Ioan and Gheorghe. He studied at the École d'application de l'artillerie et du génie in Metz and at the École d'état-major in Saumur from 1852 to 1853. After returning home, he entered the Moldavian Army, soon to become the Romanian Army, and was made a major in 1863. He commanded the elite battalion that guarded the princely palace in Bucharest on the night of 22 February 1866. In cahoots with the conspirators against domnitor Alexandru Ioan Cuza, he allowed into the palace the officers who forced the ruler's abdication.

Lecca served as War Minister immediately afterward, from February to May 1866, under Ion Ghica. Promoted colonel in 1868, he resigned from the army in 1872 and entered politics. A member of the National Liberal Party founded in 1875, he was elected to the Assembly of Deputies in 1876. He returned to service to fight in the Romanian War of Independence, again serving as War Minister under Ion C. Brătianu from July 1879 to April 1880. Lecca was Assembly President twice: October 1882 to March 1883, and October 1883 until his death at Radomirești in July 1888. He was buried in the village's Dealu Mare Church; years later, Lecca's tomb was desecrated by the communist authorities, who had it covered with a floor.
