= Dumitru Brătianu =

Romanian politician (1818–1892)

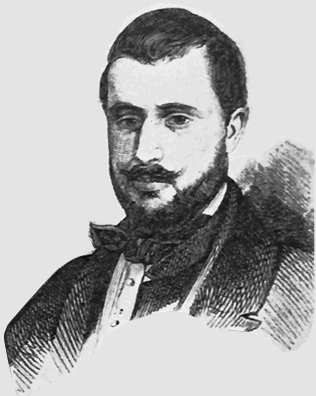

15th Prime Minister of Romania
- In office 10 April 1881 – 8 June 1881
- Monarch: Carol I
- Preceded by: Ion C. Brătianu
- Succeeded by: Ion C. Brătianu

Minister of Foreign Affairs
- In office 10 April 1881 – 8 June 1881
- Prime Minister: himself
- Preceded by: Vasile Boerescu
- Succeeded by: Eugeniu Stătescu

Mayor of Bucharest
- In office March 1866 – March 1867
- Preceded by: Constantin I. Iliescu
- Succeeded by: Panait Costache

Personal details
- Born: 1818 Pitești, Wallachia
- Died: June 8, 1892 (aged 73–74) Ştefăneşti, Kingdom of Romania
- Party: National Liberal Party
- Parents: Dincă Brătianu (father); Anastasia Brătianu (née Tigveanu) (mother)
- Relatives: Ion C. Brătianu (brother)
- Education: University of Paris

Dumitru C. Brătianu (Romanian pronunciation: [duˈmitru brətiˈanu]; 1818 – 8 June [O.S. 27 May] 1892) was the Prime Minister of Romania and Minister of Foreign Affairs from 10 April 1881 until 8 June 1881.

Born in Pitești, he was the son of stolnic Dincă Brătianu and his wife, Anastasia Brătianu (née Tigveanu), and the older brother of Ion C. Brătianu. For his studies, he went to Paris, where he took the baccalauréat in 1835 and, after one year of medical school, he studied law at the University of Paris, obtaining his law degree in 1841. In April 1848, he returned to his home country and participated in the Wallachian Revolution of 1848. After the revolution was suppressed, Dumitru Brătianu went into exile, only returning to Wallachia in July 1857.

As mayor of Bucharest, he witnessed a major event in Romania's history: the arrival of King Carol I of Hohenzollern-Sigmaringen, the first king of Romania. Brătianu received Carol I near the Băneasa Forest, where he gave a speech to over 30,000 people. Brătianu was a member of the Macedo-Romanian Cultural Society.
