= Dimitrie Sturdza =

Romanian statesman and author (1833–1914)

Dimitrie A. Sturdza
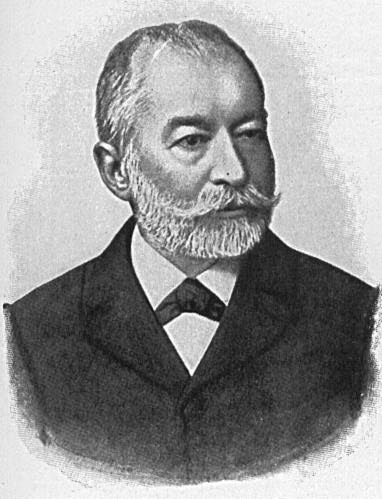

18th Prime Minister of Romania
- In office 12 March 1907 – 27 December 1908
- Monarch: Carol I
- Preceded by: Gheorghe Grigore Cantacuzino
- Succeeded by: Ion I. C. Brătianu
- In office 14 February 1901 – 20 December 1904
- Monarch: Carol I
- Preceded by: Petre P. Carp
- Succeeded by: Gheorghe Grigore Cantacuzino
- In office 31 March 1897 – 30 March 1899
- Monarch: Carol I
- Preceded by: Petre S. Aurelian
- Succeeded by: Gheorghe Grigore Cantacuzino
- In office 4 October 1895 – 21 November 1896
- Monarch: Carol I
- Preceded by: Lascăr Catargiu
- Succeeded by: Petre S. Aurelian

13th President of the Senate of Romania
- In office 20 February 1897 – 31 March 1897
- Monarch: Carol I
- Preceded by: Dimitrie Ghica
- Succeeded by: Eugeniu Stătescu

Personal details
- Born: 10 March [O.S. 26 February] 1833 Miclăuşeni, Moldavia
- Died: 21 October [O.S. 8 October] 1914 Bucharest, Kingdom of Romania
- Resting place: Bellu Cemetery, Bucharest
- Party: National Liberal Party
- Parents: Alexandru 'Alecu' Sturdza-Miclăuşanu; Ecaterina Sturdza
- Occupation: Statesman; author

Dimitrie A. Sturdza (Romanian pronunciation: [diˈmitri.e ˈsturza], in full Dimitrie Alexandru Sturdza-Miclăușanu; 10 March [O.S. 26 February] 1833 – 21 October [O.S. 8 October] 1914) was a Romanian statesman and author of the late 19th century, and president of the Romanian Academy between 1882 and 1884. He was an aristocrat and member of the House of Sturdza.

== Biography ==
Born in Miclăuşeni, Moldavia, and educated in Iași at the Academia Mihăileană, he continued his studies in Germany at Munich, Göttingen, Bonn, and Berlin. He took part in the political movements of the time.

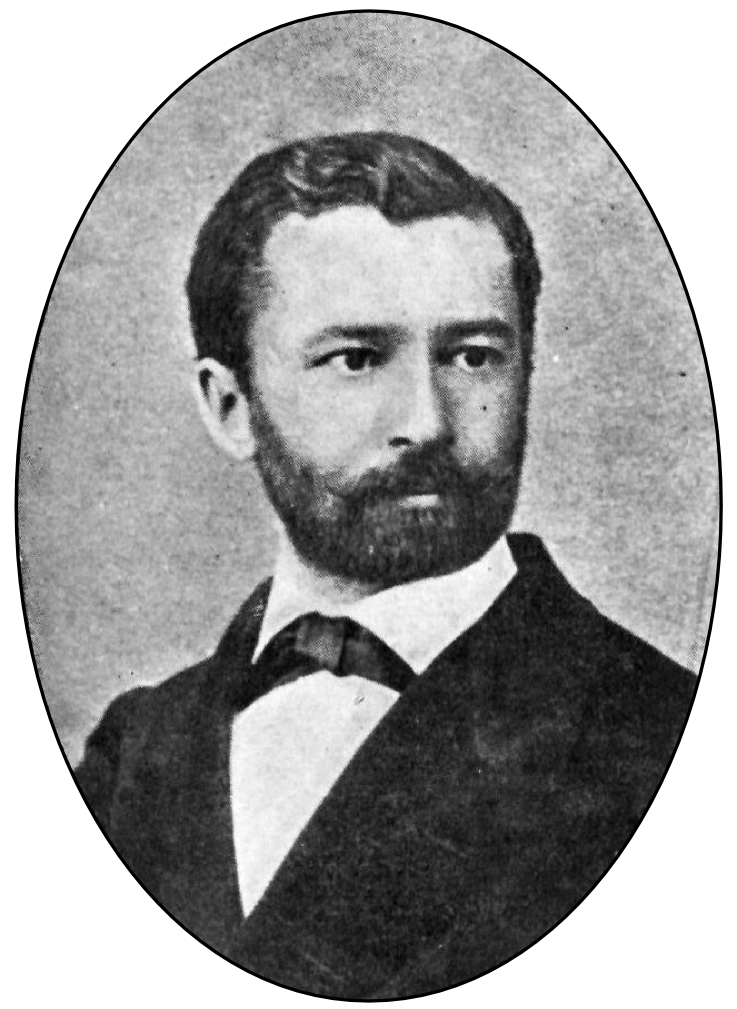

Sturdza was private secretary to Prince Alexandru Ioan Cuza in the early years of his reign. During this time he also held a couple of ministerial posts in the Moldavian government (Minister of Cults and Education - 1859, Minister of Public Works - 1861). He afterwards turned against the increasingly unsanctioned rule of Cuza, becoming one of the most zealous promoters of his overthrow. In 1866, he joined Ion C. Brătianu and others in the deposition of Cuza and the election of Prince Charles of Hohenzollern (later King Carol I of Romania). He was a founding member of the National Liberal Party (1875). In the cabinets of Brătianu, 1876–88, he repeatedly held ministerial posts.

In 1892 he was elected leader of the National Liberal Party in succession to Brătianu, and was four times Prime Minister. During his last term in office, in 1907, Sturdza was called by King Carol I to handle the crisis created by the peasants' revolt of March.

Although noted for his capacity for work, he was also a nationalist, resentful of "aliens" (in line with the anti-Jewish policies of his party), and supported blocking non-Romanians from a large number of social positions. Sturdza was a notorious antisemite, supporting measures such as the expulsion of Romanian Jews, and he was known for his opposition towards the naturalization of the Jews in Romania. He was responsible for the exile of Romanian Jewish intellectuals Moses Gaster and Lazăr Şăineanu. Nevertheless, he expressed support for the emerging Zionist movement: he supported the organization of the 1881 Focșani Zionist Congress and, in an 1886 interview for New York Herald, he declared that "the idea of a Jewish state is an exceptional idea" and that "the creation of a Jewish state is the only solution for the Jewish Question".

He was appointed permanent secretary of the Romanian Academy, and became a recognized authority on Romanian numismatics. As secretary of the academy he was instrumental in assisting the publication of the collections of historic documents made by Constantin Hurmuzachi (30 vols., Bucharest, 1876–1897), and other acts and documents, as well as a number of minor political pamphlets of transitory value.

His son Alexandru D. Sturdza, by then a Colonel in the Romanian Army, defected to the Germans in 1916, during World War I.

== Works ==
- La Marche progressive de la Russie sur le Danube (1878)
- Uebersicht der Münzen und Medaillen des Fürstentums Rumänien (1874)
- Europa, Russia, Romania (1888)
- La question des portes de fer et des cataractes du Danube (1899)
- Charles I., roi de Roumanie (1899 et seq.)
- Otu, Petre, Georgescu, Maria: Durchleuchtung eines Verrats. Der Fall des Oberst Alexandru D. Sturdza. Lektor Verlag. Hainburg. 2022.

== See also ==
- Sturdza family

== Notes ==
Preceded by Lascăr Catargiu	Prime Minister of Romania; 15 October 1895–2 December 1896	Succeeded by Petre S. Aurelian
Preceded by Petre S. Aurelian	Prime Minister of Romania; 12 April 1897–23 April 1899	Succeeded by Gheorghe Cantacuzino
Preceded by Petre P. Carp	Prime Minister of Romania; 27 February 1901–4 January 1906	Succeeded by Gheorghe Cantacuzino
Preceded by Gheorghe Cantacuzino	Prime Minister of Romania; 24 March 1907–9 January 1909	Succeeded by Ion I. C. Brătianu
