= Ion C. Brătianu =

Romanian politician (1821–1891)

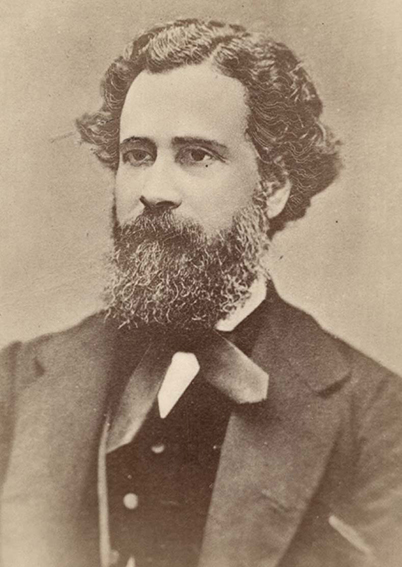

14th Prime Minister of Romania
- In office 9 June 1881 – 20 March 1888
- Monarch: Carol I
- Preceded by: Dumitru Brătianu
- Succeeded by: Theodor Rosetti
- In office 24 July 1876 – 9 April 1881
- Monarch: Carol I
- Preceded by: Manolache Costache Epureanu
- Succeeded by: Dumitru Brătianu

Personal details
- Born: 2 June 1821 Pitești, Wallachia
- Died: 4 May 1891 (aged 69) Ștefănești, Argeș, Argeș County, Kingdom of Romania
- Resting place: Vila Florica, Ștefănești
- Party: National Liberal Party
- Spouse: Pia Brătianu (m. 1858)
- Children: 8, including Ionel, Dinu and Vintilă
- Parents: Constantin „Dincă” Brătianu; Anastasia "Sica" Brătianu, née Tigveanu
- Relatives: Dumitru Brătianu (brother), Ion Pillat (grandson)
- Occupation: Politician

Ion Constantin Brătianu (Romanian pronunciation: [iˈon brətiˈanu]; 2 June [O.S. 21 May] 1821 – 4 May [O.S. 22 April] 1891) was one of the major political figures of 19th-century Romania. He was the son of Dincă Brătianu and the younger brother of Dumitru Brătianu, as well as the father of Ion I. C. Brătianu, Dinu Brătianu and Vintilă Brătianu.

== Biography ==
=== Early life ===
Born to wealthy boyars based in Pitești, the main town of the Argeș region in the Principality of Wallachia, he entered the Wallachian Army in 1838, and in 1841 started studying in Paris. Returning to his native land, Brătianu took part, with his friend C. A. Rosetti and other young politicians including his brother, in the 1848 Wallachian Revolution, and acted as police prefect in the provisional government formed that year.

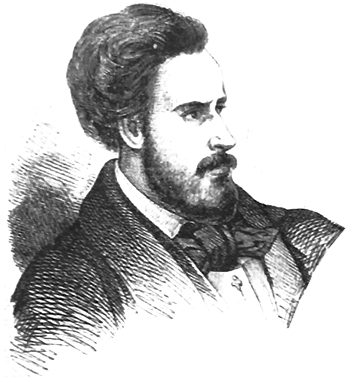
Brătianu in 1848, detail of a group portrait of Provisional Government members

The restoration of Russian and Ottoman authority shortly afterwards drove him into exile. He took refuge in Paris and endeavoured to influence French opinion in favor of the proposed union and autonomy of the Romanian Danubian Principalities. In 1854, however, he was sentenced to a fine and three months' imprisonment for sedition and later confined in a lunatic asylum; in 1856, he returned to Wallachia with his brother – afterwards one of his foremost political opponents.

=== Under Cuza and in the opposition ===
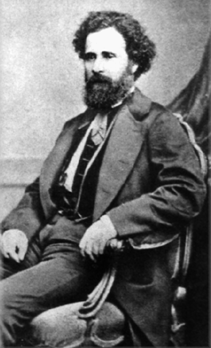

As a member of the National Party or Partida Naţională, he was in favor of the union of the Danubian Principalities, Wallachia and Moldavia. In 1875, during the reign of Alexander Ioan Cuza (r. 1859–1866), Brătianu founded the National Liberal Party (PNL), which became a major political formation until the Communist takeover and again after the 1989 overthrow of their regime. Opposition to the land reform united the emerging Liberals and Conservatives against the Domnitor (ruling prince) and his inner circle. Both parties comprised mainly landowners who allied to block legislation in the Chamber, causing Cuza to impose an authoritarian government in May 1864. The two-party alliance, remembered as the monstrous coalition, opted for the removal of Cuza. Brătianu took part in the deposition of 1866 and in the subsequent election of Carol I, under whom he held several ministerial appointments throughout the next four years.

Nonetheless, his relationship with the new Prince was the source of several crises. Notably, Brătianu would point to the benefits of a republican project (which Rosetti and his left wing of the Liberal Party had never ceased advocating). Thus, when the experimental Republic of Ploiești was created in 1870 around a Liberal group, Ion Brătianu was arrested as the inspirational figure, but was soon released.

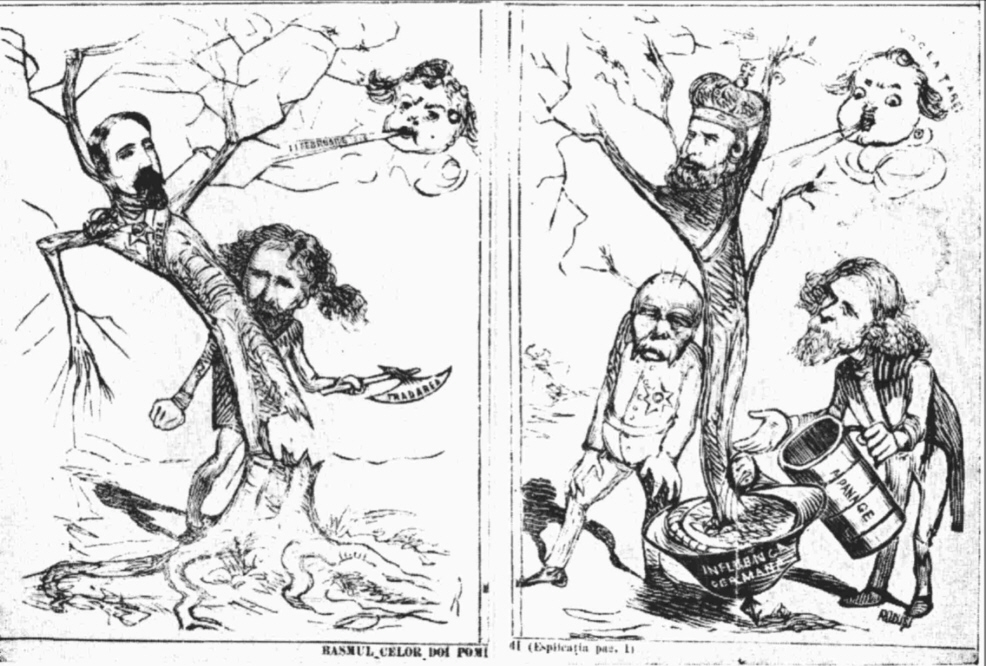
Anti-dynasty cartoon, published in Ghimpele, 1872. Left: Alexander Ioan Cuza betrayed by Brătianu; right: Carol I, supported by Otto von Bismarck and Brătianu, feeding off of German influence and economic privilege

In 1871, the Liberals organized protests in favor of France – just defeated in the Franco-Prussian War – and implicitly against the German Empire, the Conservatives and Prince Carol. The moment showed the weaknesses of the Liberals, as well as Carol's resolution: the Prince called on Lascăr Catargiu to form a stable and reliable government. The change in tactics forced the Liberals to form their loose tendency as a real party in 1875. Alongside several liberal tenets, the new formation took a further step towards advocating protectionism and persecution of Jewish Romanians (see History of the Jews in Romania). In 1876, aided by C. A. Rosetti, Brătianu formed a Liberal cabinet, which remained in power until 1888; this marked his coming to terms with Carol.

=== Prominence ===
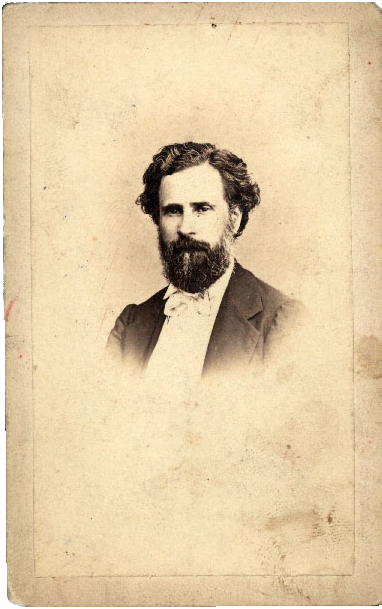
Ion C. Brătianu postcard, Atelier Franz Dusche. King Ferdinand I National Military Museum.

The government took steps to remove the country from Ottoman vassalage; however, it differed from the Conservatives in that they saw the main threat to Romania as coming from Austria-Hungary. The Liberals were of the generation that had truly brought Romanians in Transylvania to the country's attention; on the other hand, Catargiu had signed an agreement with the Austrian monarchy that awarded it commercial privilege in Romania – while quieting its suspicion toward Romanian irredentism. Brătianu's government did not disturb this climate after the Russian alliance proved unsatisfactory, and the two parties resorted to assisting Romanian cultural ventures in Transylvania (until World War I).

He aligned the country with Russia as soon as the Russo-Turkish War of 1877–1878 began, which included a campaign against Ottoman strongholds south of the Danube known in Romania as the Romanian War of Independence. While Romania emancipated itself from Ottoman tutelage, Brătianu, who remained as the head of a second cabinet in 1878–79, had to accommodate a prolonged Russian occupation, and the Congress of Berlin saw Russia seizing Southern Bessarabia, the only part of Bessarabia still under Romanian control (Romania was awarded Northern Dobruja in return).

After the war, the Principality of Bulgaria appeared and began searching for a prince. According to Nikolay Pavlovich Ignatyev, Brătianu supported the election of Prince Carol I as monarch of Bulgaria, intending to establish a personal union.

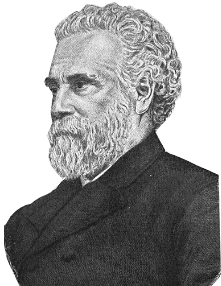
Ion C. Brătianu in later life

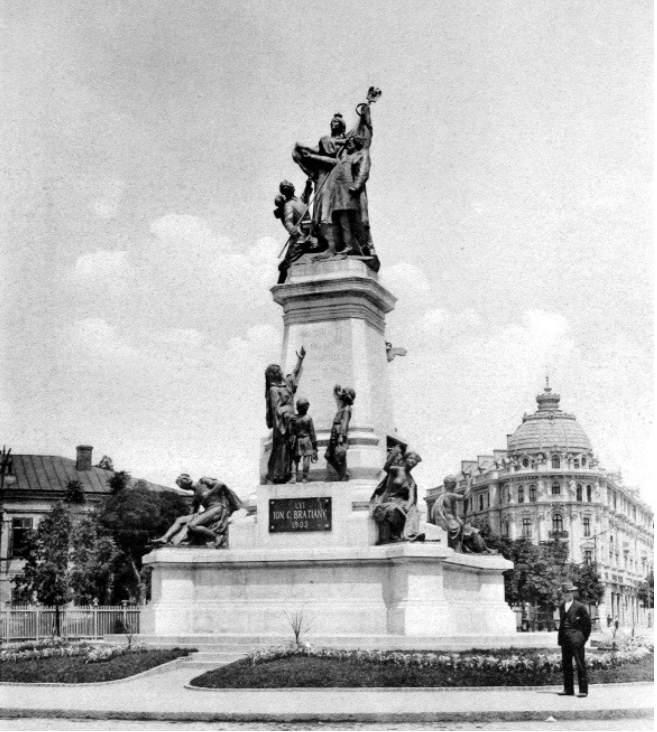
Monument to Ion C. Brătianu (sculptor Ernest Henri Dubois), unveiled in Bucharest in 1903 and removed in 1948

The Congress also pressured the Liberals to discard discriminatory policies, and the government agreed to allow Jews and Dobrujan Muslims to apply for citizenship (with a 10-year probation) but continued forbidding foreign-born people or non-citizens from owning land. However, Brătianu had anti-Semitic views, publishing discriminatory laws and being responsible for the exile of various Jewish Romanian intellectuals. The most famous Jewish intellectual exiled by Brătianu was Moses Gaster, at the initiative of Dimitrie A. Sturdza.

The Brătianu government introduced most modern reforms in the administrative, educational, economic and military fields. It celebrated its main success in 1883, when the Liberals managed to have the 1866 Constitution of Romania amended – enlarging the number of electors and establishing a third electoral college, which gave some representation to peasants and urban employees. The move was not radical, and it served to secure Liberal political ascendancy: the first elections under the new law brought them an overwhelming majority.

In 1886, after a meeting with Carol I and the Bulgarian prince Alexander of Battenberg, Brătianu informed the Bulgarian diplomat Grigor Nachovich that Alexander had requested a Balkan confederation under Carol’s leadership. This turned out to be a misunderstanding.

After 1883 Brătianu acted as sole leader of the party, owing to a quarrel with Rosetti, his ally for nearly forty years. His long tenure, without parallel in Romanian history, rendered Brătianu extremely unpopular, and at its close his impeachment appeared inevitable. But any proceedings against the minister would have involved charges against the king, who was largely responsible for his policy, and the impeachment was averted by a vote of parliament in February 1890.

=== Other activities ===
Besides being the leading statesman of Romania during 1876–1888, Brătianu attained some eminence as a writer. His French language political pamphlets — Mémoire sur l'empire d'Autriche dans la question d'Orient (1855), Réflexions sur la situation (1856), Mémoire sur la situation de la Moldavie depuis le traité de Paris (1857), and La Question religieuse en Roumanie (1866) — were all published in Paris.

== In memoriam ==
Many places, schools and streets in Romania are named after him, including:

- The commune I. C. Brătianu in Tulcea County
- The Ion C. Brătianu National College in Pitești
- The I. C. Brătianu National College in Hațeg
- The Ion C. Brătianu Boulevard in central Bucharest
- I. C. Brătianu Plaza in Timișoara
- The Mihail Kogălniceanu-class river monitor, Ion C. Brătianu (F-46)
