= Nicolae Voinov =

Romanian politician (1834–1899)

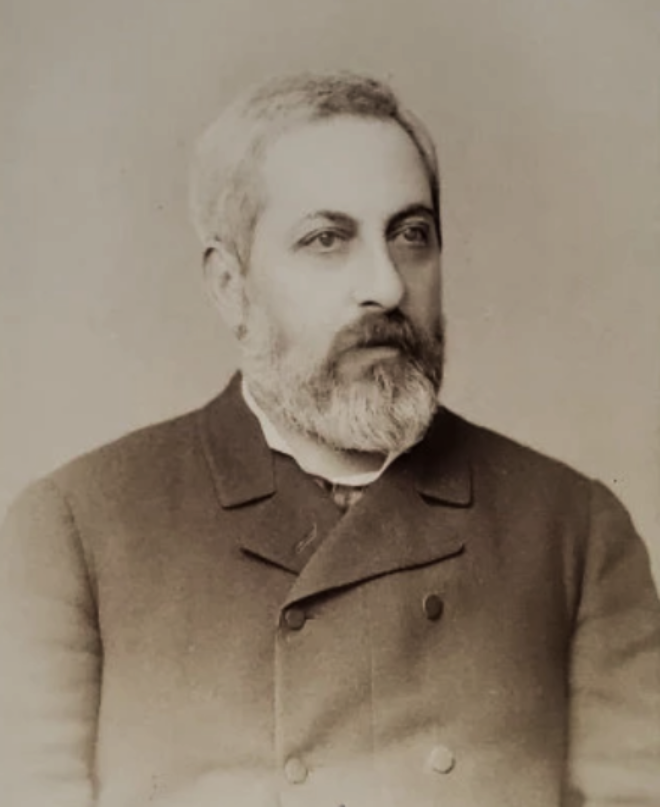
- Photograph of Voinov by Franz Mandy, c. 1880

Romanian Minister of Justice
- In office 16 November 1883 – 16 January 1885
- Preceded by: Gheorghe Chițu (interim)
- Succeeded by: Ion I. Câmpineanu (interim)

Member of the Assembly of Deputies of Romania
- In office April 1866 – May 1871
- In office 10 June 1876 – 3 February 1877
- In office May 1883 – November 1894
- Constituency: Putna County

Member of the Senate of Romania
- In office January 1877 – 1 March 1877
- Constituency: Roman County
- In office April 1877 – May 1883
- Constituency: Putna County

Personal details
- Born: 1834 Focșani, Moldavia
- Died: 29 May 1899 (aged 64–65) Bucharest, Kingdom of Romania
- Party: Free and Independent Faction (c. 1872–1882); Sincere Liberal (1882–1883); PNL (1883–1886); United Opposition (1889–1891); Junimea/Constitutionalist (1891–1899)
- Spouse: Eliza Corbu (m. 1867; died 1889)
- Children: Dimitrie Desilă Voinov (adopted)
- Profession: Jurist, journalist, librarian, archivist, poet

Nicolae T. Voinov, also Niculai, Neculai or Nicu Voinov (1834 – 29 May 1899), was a Romanian jurist and politician, whose career was intimately tied to the city of Focșani. He was born there as the son of an Aromanian settler (whose Ottoman citizenship was cited by adversaries as proof that Voinov Jr was not qualified for naturalization). In his twenties, he embraced the tenets of Romanian nationalism, primarily calls for the political unification of Moldavia and Wallachia. He served as a judge and prosecutor in the resulting United Principalities, being also sent to the Assembly of Deputies of Romania, where he represented Putna County. From his debut in political life, Voinov expressed himself as a radical-liberal: his unrestrained opposition to Jewish emancipation dovetailed with his endorsement of democratization, unicameralism, and peasant interests. He joined the Free and Independent Faction, and came into conflict with the conservative caucus that supported Lascăr Catargiu, and at one point engineered Catargiu's prosecution for fraud.

During the late 1870s, Voinov served in the Senate; his first term was blocked by opposition from Mihail Kogălniceanu, but he managed to return just as the Romanian War of Independence was starting. He took a minority position against breaking off ties with the Ottomans, but afterwards supported the military effort. His antisemitism resurfaced after the 1878 Treaty of Berlin, when he successfully blocked efforts to naturalize most of Romania's resident Jews. As the independent Romanian Kingdom was being created, he was welcomed into George D. Vernescu's Sincere Liberal Party—but soon after joined the consolidated National Liberal Party, which was enacting his cherished electoral reform, by expanding suffrage. Voinov was then co-opted as Minister of Justice in the fourth Brătianu cabinet; he only served as such between late 1883 and early 1885, with his mandate entangled in controversies over the selection of judges and prosecutors. Shortly after resignation, he was publicly slapped by one of his former subordinates.

Reappearing as an independent critic of the National Liberals (primarily for what he saw as their indifference to Focșani's well-being), Voinov was pushed into an uneasy alliance with Catargiu's Conservative Party, and in 1889 joined the "United Opposition", which regrouped the more uncompromising antagonists. At that time, he became vocal in his critique of centralizing policies, arguing that Western Moldavia was being discriminated against. Publicly shunned by Conservatives such as Nicolae Blaremberg, he switched his allegiance to the Junimea faction, which he equated with true liberalism. When Junimea became a "Constitutionalist Party" in 1891, Voinov was co-opted as a full member and regional boss; he accepted its alliances with Catargiu, but criticized the latter's policies, and several times stood up to the Junimist leader, Petre P. Carp. Unlike the Constitutionalist core, Voinov opposed any relaxation of the inherited antisemitic policies, while defending Romanian socialists—a group which had come to include his adoptive son, the biologist Dimitrie Voinov. Voinov Sr failed to gain the public trust, and a seat in Parliament, in the mid-to-late 1890s. He died just as his loss in the May 1899 election was being announced.

== Early life ==
Voinov was born in Focșani in 1834. At that time, Moldavia was a vassal subject of the Ottoman Empire, but governed more directly by the Russian Empire (under the Regulamentul Organic arrangement). Medical historian Radu Iftimovici describes the Voinovs as having Aromanian origins, with their ancestral home located at Veles, in Ottoman Rumelia. In a November 1890 speech, Voinov described himself as an ethnic Romanian, while noting that he also had a regional, Moldavian, identity, and that he believed it was "not a crime" to mention the latter. As early as 1877, the Allgemeine Zeitung reported that Voinov was an ethnic Bulgarian, and this was also claimed in 1890 by one of his political adversaries, Grigore Tocilescu, who also called him "a stranger to the country and its language." A formal inquest made in 1877 by Nicolae Haralambie concluded that Voinov was only a Romanian (and a Moldavian) through his mother, whereas his father had been born a foreign subject. As Haralambie noted, this did not invalidate Nicolae himself from having full political rights, since his father had also been fully naturalized under the Regulamentul criteria.

Voinov was an adherent of the Romanian Orthodox Church, and publicly stated his faith. He was educated in Moldavia (according to Haralambie, he had "attended Romanian schools and displayed Romanian feelings"). He entered literary records in 1857, when he published a poem that celebrated the return of southern Bessarabia to Moldavia, upon the end of the Crimean War. Young Voinov's political sympathies soon gravitated toward the larger agenda of Romanian nationalism, which looked forward to a political union between Moldavia and Wallachia. As such, he wrote for the unionist newspapers Zimbrul and Stéoa Dunărei. On 7 February 1857, the latter published an open letter of protest by nationalist boyars and commoners, including Voinov. These men warned that the Ottomans were already rigging the legislative elections of July. During the repeat election of 1858, he and Alecu D. Holban were briefly arrested by the Moldavian government, which still opposed the nationalist project; the two young men had angered the regime by attending a unionist gala, and by dressing up in Romanian folk costume.

Voinov's first government job was as a stenographer for the Central Commission in Focșani, which had been set up as a federal body of the United Principalities. In mid-1859, he was also the commission's librarian and archivist, working with lists of books and documents provided to him by the activist and historian Mihail Kogălniceanu. He first served as a prosecutor and then, from 1862 to 1864, presided over the Putna County tribunal. His contacts there Vasile Mălinescu, a former deputy in the ad hoc Divan, whom he came to describe as both an icon of the liberal politics and his personal best friend. In October 1864, Voinov was made government attorney of the appellate court of Fălciu County. He was eventually attracted by professional politics: after local elections in late 1864, he served on Fălciu's administrative council, alongside Kogălniceanu.

While embarking on this career path, Voinov also married Eliza Corbu, who was a distant relative of Alexandru Averescu, the future Marshal of Romania. In 1867, the couple adopted Eliza's infant nephew, Dimitrie Desilă, whose mother had died of tuberculosis. Following elections in April 1866, Voinov was sent to the Assembly of Deputies, which was also shaping a new constitutional framework under Domnitor Carol I. In that context, Voinov and his colleague Nicolae Ionescu unsuccessfully campaigned for unicameralism; Voinov's claim was that creating a Senate would alienate the masses, and reduce support for the constitution itself. Though he himself later accepted a senatorial seat, he was always critical of the census suffrage and the electoral colleges, arguing that the conservative caucus had managed to split Romania along a system of "castes".

== Antisemitic legislator ==
Voinov also co-sponsored a bill submitted by Theodor Lateș, which aimed to stop all Jewish immigrants at the country's external borders. Their proposal, while backed by Ionescu and Ion Heliade Rădulescu, was also struck down by the voting majority. He was reelected a deputy for the third college of Putna in November 1866, and reelected in December 1867. The Assembly was investigating the death of deputy Scarlat Vârnav, and the pogrom it had sparked in Bârlad—itself prompted by allegations that the notoriously antisemitic Vârnav had been poisoned by the Jews. Voinov sided with the antisemites: while not endorsing their claims about Vârnav's death, he argued that the violence was in fact stoked by secretive Jews, and then blamed on the Romanians. In April 1868, he adhered to a bill that proposed denying Jews any civil rights, citing the "imperious necessity to guarantee the Romanians against Jewish exploitation". The text also described Judaism as inherently hostile to "the burdens and duties of modern society", alleging that its religious message "[strove] to preserve [the Jews'] complete individuality as a privileged and separate race".

In tandem, Voinov advocated for the sharecroppers, protesting initiatives that would have allowed the landed gentry to protect their estates with "armies" of wardens and gamekeepers. The young deputy also involved himself in other controversies: in a March letter to the Assembly, he claimed that three officers of the Civic Guard had stormed into his Focșani offices and had threatened to kill him, unless he retracted his critique of their institution. By his own account, he had stood up for Kogălniceanu, who was being threatened with expulsion from the Assembly due to immoral conduct. Since in later years he became Kogălniceanu's enemy, he also came to regret his initial stances. Still a practicing lawyer, he was attached to the bar association in Iași County in or around 1868, and from May 1870 represented government at the appellate court in Focșani. By December 1869, the Romanian land fund had sold him the Mitroaioa estate, outside Dălhăuți (in Râmnicu Sărat County), though he was warned for failing to make his payments.

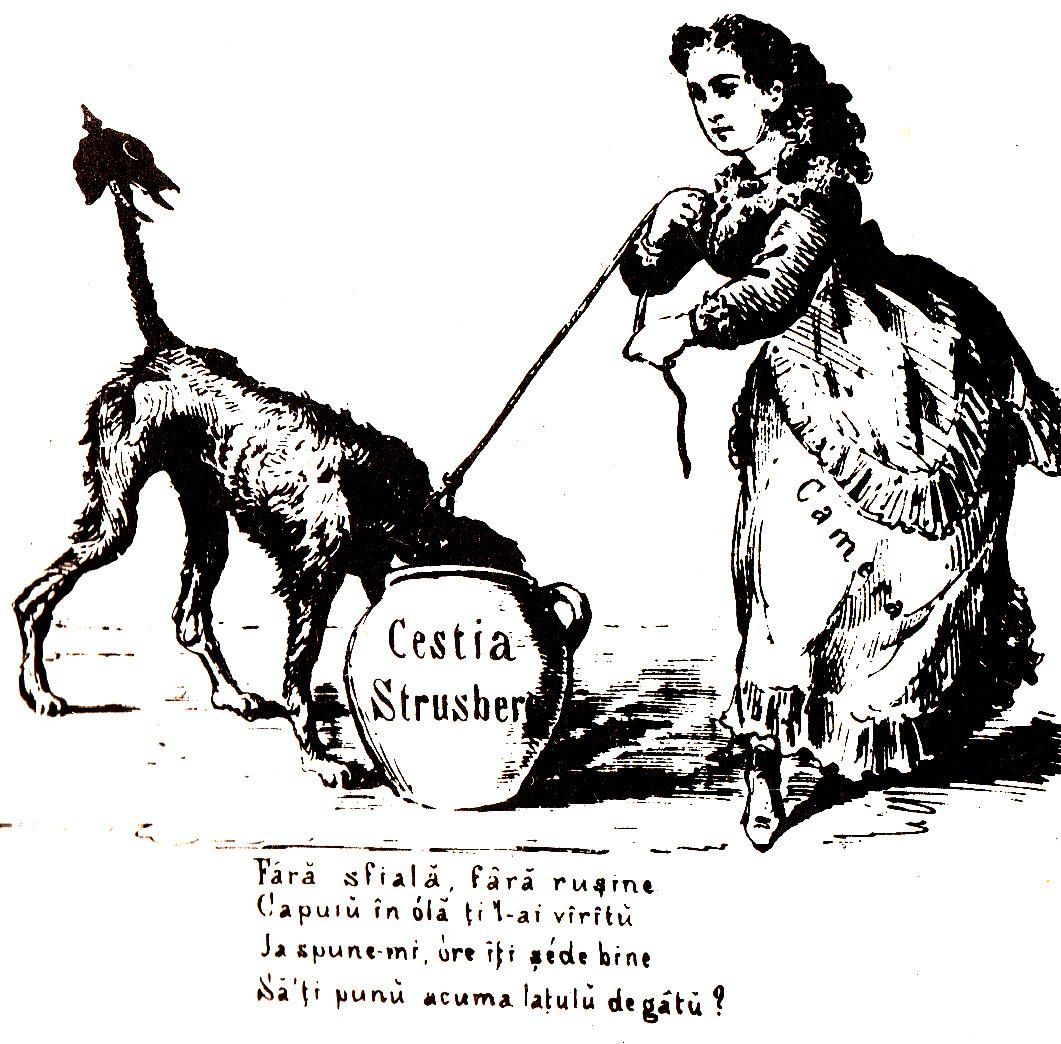
The Assembly tethering a Pickelhaube-wearing dog caught eating from a pot marked "Strousberg Affair". May 1871 cartoon in the liberal Ghimpele

The liberal caucus split into quarreling factions ahead of new elections in March 1869. Voinov, who was reconfirmed as deputy, came to endorse a thin majority formed around Kogălniceanu. In November 1869, he openly rejoiced that this coalition, which had sowed division in the other parliamentary groups, had managed to elect Kogălniceanu as vice president of that chamber. Voinov was still worried about the prospects of Jewish naturalization, which he believed was a secret policy of the Ghica ministry. In December, he grilled Vasile Boerescu, the Justice Minister, about supposed encounters between Borescu and Lord Clarendon; Voinov identified Clarendon as the representative of international Jewish interests. In March 1870, Voinov confronted the Prime Minister, Dimitrie Ghica, about the "Strousberg Affair"—namely, the build-transfer-operate railways contract between the Romanian state and the Jewish investor Bethel Henry Strousberg, whose businesses were being exposed as nearing bankruptcy. Ghica responded by noting that the original contract had been vetted by the Kingdom of Prussia, the French Empire, as well as, tacitly, by Voinov's own party.

Reconfirmed as deputy with elections in March 1870, Voinov took a moderate stance, opposing Ghica's criminal investigation for the Strousberg deal. In August, the country witnessed a failed rebellion against Domnitor Carol. The would-be insurgent, Alexandru Candiano-Popescu, was arrested on the sport, having forfeited his parliamentary immunity. Released by November, Candiano personally thanked Voinov for having raised the issue in the Assembly. Also then, Voinov chaired a parliamentary commission tasked with investigating Candiano's detainment. In presenting his report, he observed that the suspect's reintegration into the Assembly would not offer him immunity from prosecution, and also dismissed claims that he and the others had validated public disorder by bringing up a rebel's constitutional rights.

== Against Catargiu and Kogălniceanu ==
The uprising had taken place concurrently with the war between France and Prussia, in which Voinov and other liberals sided with the former camp. In February 1871, registered as a justice of the peace in Ploiești, he donated 12 lei for the peasants of Franche-Comté. He and Nicolae Fleva were candidates at Putna's third college for elections of May 1871, in opposition to the right-wing Catargiu cabinet. They were defeated, but, as a local observer claimed, only through fraudulent procedures personally introduced by Prefect Dimitrie Nicolaide. In the aftermath, Voinov himself claimed that, during government personally targeted him and his family with terror tactics. Specifically, he reported that his townhouse in Focșani was menacigly surrounded by Dorobanți cavalrymen, who presented themselves as his government-appointed protectors. Starting in June, he and Fleva served as attorneys for a group of Focșani citizens who claimed that they have been physically assaulted up by the police forces. Together, they filed a civil suit against Nicolaide.

During his political hiatus, Voinov was Putna's government attorney (appointed June 1872). He was one of the major figures of the Free and Independent Faction, which represented Moldavian (or, more narrowly, Western Moldavian) interests within the liberal coalitions. Unlike other Factionalists, he opposed the establishment in 1875 of a consolidated National Liberal Party (PNL), since the group's agenda mentioned full independence from the Ottoman Empire as a cherished ideal. He maintained that the remaining links with the Ottomans were in the country's best interest. Alongside Ionescu, he campaigned for the Assembly elections of June 1876, informing peasant voters about their political rights. On 10 June, he was elected "nearly unanimously" by Putna's third college, alongside Ștefan Sihleanu and Trifan Boiu. He now supported an investigative committee that would prosecute the previous administration. With Alexandru Gheorghiu and Andrei Vizanti, he handled the inquiry at the Ministry of Religious Affairs. From August 1876, he sat on a seven-man panel that presented the Assembly's case against Lascăr Catargiu and other former ministers before the High Court of Cassation and Justice. In a ramification of the scandal, his colleague on that panel, Petru Șoarec, was sued by a Catargiu-era prefect, Gheorghe Rosnovanu, for having performed a warrantless search on Rosnovanu's property. Voinov stepped in as Șoarec's legal counsel.

The mid-to-late 1870s brought the Eastern question to the forefront of European affairs. Romania initially watched from the side as a series of Serbian–Ottoman Wars took place in the Balkans, though the PNL's Epureanu cabinet also attempted to assist in the humanitarian effort; Voinov was critical of the Ottomans, since they had refused to allow in a Romanian Red Cross ambulance, but also advised against any form of escalation. During this heated period, Voinov created additional controversy by running in a by-election for the second-college Senate seat of Roman County, held in January 1877. According to the Allgemeine Zeitung, he agreed to do so by embracing a cause of the liberal, or "Red", caucus, which was "only weakly represented" in the Senate. However, Voinov had not yet resigned his seat in the Assembly, which was legally questionable—prompting some of his new colleagues to demand that the results be invalidated. He ultimately resigned as deputy on 3 February; some members of the majority, in particular Iorgu Pruncu, still tried to make him reconsider, noting that he had fulfilled his duties in the Catargiu investigation.

The election continued to be disputed into late February, in particular after objections regarding his citizenship qualifications were brought up by senators Kogălniceanu and Panait Cazimir. The discussion was viewed as exhausted and ended by vote on 23 February, leading Kogălniceanu to register his complaint. In an open letter of 24 February, Voinov outlined his newfound disdain toward Kogălniceanu, while informing his voters that he himself remained a "loyal soldier of honest liberalism". The issue was revisited on 1 March, when Voinov's mandate was invalidated. Though public perception was that he had been ousted as a non-citizen, the Senate had brought up another concern, determining that the voters' roll used in January had been corrupted by Catargiu. Voinov was defended not just by his followers, but also, in part, by the right-wing daily Timpul, which noted that Senate had a double-standard. According to Timpul, Kogălniceanu was cruel toward the Factionalists, and especially toward Voinov; instead of pursuing the citizenship question, he had presented his colleagues with a technicality, ensuring that Voinov would go out "through the back door". Forty-three of Voinov's voters issued a public protest, in which they suggested that Kogălniceanu had a deal with "Focșani's reactionaries".

== War of Independence ==
Now qualifying among the major landowners of Western Moldavia, Voinov re-entered the Senate with the first-college election of April 1877, winning Putna with 26 votes against Gheorghe Apostoleanu's 25. The one-vote margin was invoked by Apostoleanu as grounds for a revote. In his reply, Voinov indicated that the pivotal voter was one of Apostoleanu's own relatives, otherwise known to have repeatedly voted for liberal candidates. Over the following months, Romania was itself dragged into the Ottoman crisis. Voinov (in the Senate) and Ionescu (as deputy) stood out for opposing the 1877 independence war, part of a decisive Russo–Turkish War. Once the majority had voted for going to war, Voinov no longer objected—in October, alongside figures such as I. F. Robescu and Panaite Tufelcică, he established a committee that purchased arms for the undersupplied infantrymen. His wife Eliza also joined a Red-Cross committee that collected 700 lei over its first day of activity.

As the war was coming to an end, Voinov had given his endorsement to the first Brătianu cabinet, which had Kogălniceanu at Foreign Affairs. In February 1878, he stood up to the conservative leaders Ghica, Boerescu, and Petre P. Carp, who had interpellated the administration regarding its Russian policies, and in particular its cession of southern Bessarabia. Voinov now argued that the cabinet had done all in its power to secure European guarantees, and that the opposition was being unfair. On 13 February, he and Dimitrie Gianni co-wrote the motion of confidence, which passed through Senate 39 votes to 2 (and 2 abstentions).

Voinov also returned to representing the most radically antisemitic side of the liberal caucus: in 1878, he virulently opposed international pressures toward lifting citizenship restrictions; in that context, he proposed explicitly excluding any of the resident Jews from obtatining naturalization. By April of that year, he was also opposing election-reform bills advanced by the right-wing senators. In his allocution, he declared that the existing laws, while imperfect, had created a third-college of urbanites, whom he saw as the country's most responsible voters. Voinov proposed that merging these precincts with the peasant collages, as had been proposed by the conservatives, was inherently a downgrade—since peasants were "more likely to be influenced by government." He had by then registered another setback, in January 1878, when the Catargiu prosecution was simply withdrawn. This outcome incensed Catargiu himself, who had wanted his name cleared by the country's supreme court.

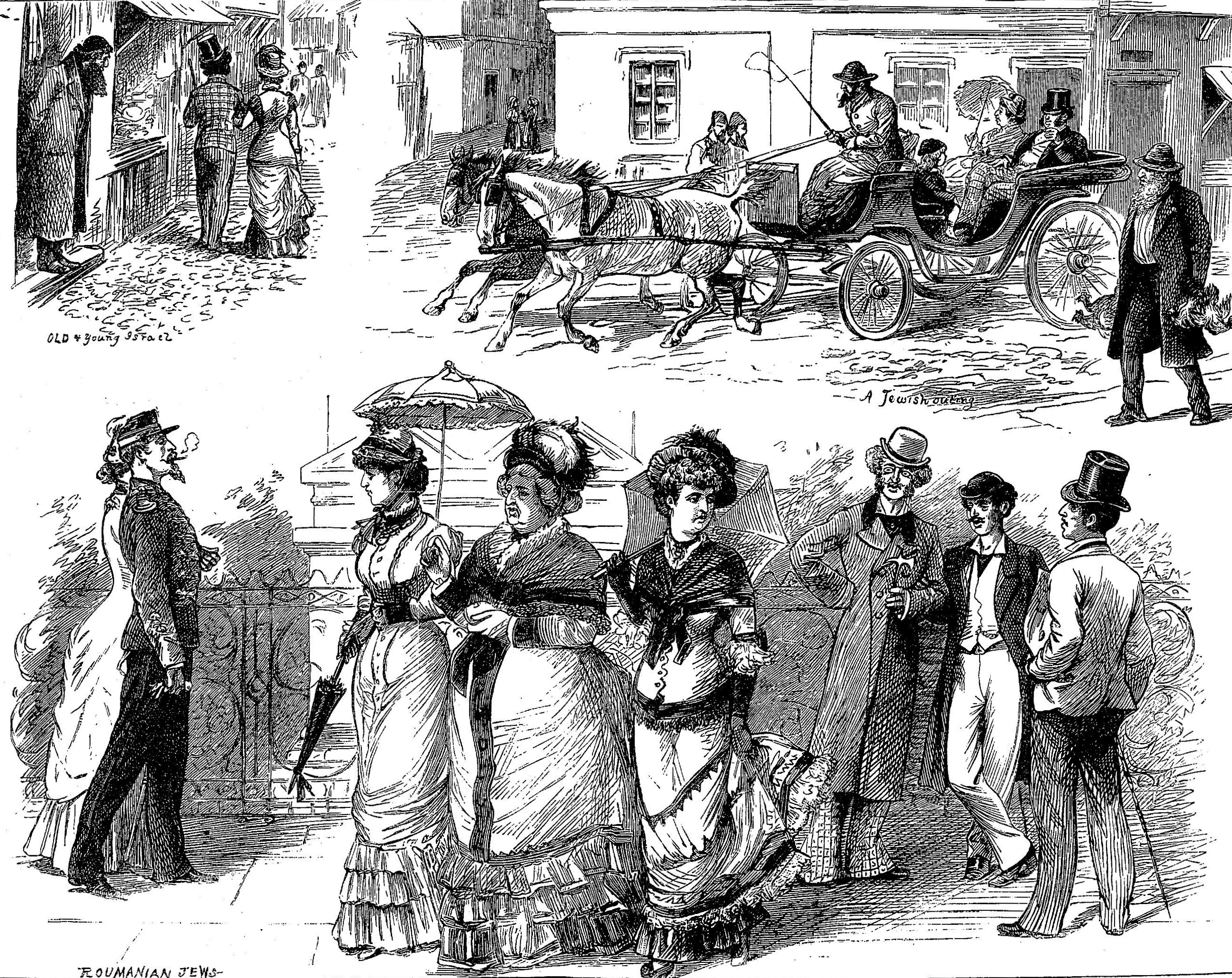
Sketches of Jews from Galați, in an 1879 reportage for The Graphic

Romania obtained independence through the Treaty of Berlin in July 1878. At the end of this process, in December 1878, Voinov softened his stances on naturalization and religious discrimination, proposing a constitutional amendment that granted citizenship to the Muslims of Northern Dobruja. He remained opposed to Jewish emancipation, and, later that month, managed to obtain consensus against the lifting of anti-Jewish provisions. He reportedly did so by initially advancing an emancipation law through the Senate, then waiting on the Assembly to propose a more restrictive bill, and, finally, by introducing the Assembly text for a vote in the Senate. In that context, Voinov, Ionescu, Alecu D. Holban and Pantazi Ghica also acted as lawyers for a group of citizens from Darabani, accused of having beaten up a group of Jews tenants who had not paid up on their leases. The latter, represented in court by Titu Maiorescu, lost the jury trial.

According to an editorial in Romanulu, Voinov was ambivalent in his opposition to the PNL and the second Brătianu cabinet: like the other Factionalists, he "feared a right-wing's ministry more than a national-liberal party cabinet". On 28 February 1879, he had a verbal joust with Boerescu. The latter accused him of having stoked antisemitism for demagogic reasons. Voinov rejected that claim, noting that he himself did not want Romania isolated from Europe; he made his adversary concede that the Treaty of Berlin had never asked for the Jews to be naturalized as a bloc, and that therefore there was no real opposition to selective Jews being emancipated.

== Vernescu ally and "independent liberal" ==
Voinov was reelected senator in Putna during the race for office in May 1879. He became somewhat opposed to the third Brătianu cabinet, which was pushing through a constitutional amendment to lift religious restrictions on naturalization, which would have allowed some Jews to acquire citizenship, and would have reduced Romania's international isolation. Voinov and Vasile Alecsandri tried to oppose this measure, advancing a Senate bill which would have barred all such attempts. It was defeated 53 votes to 1—the one vote was Voinov's, while Alecsandri abstained. In late 1880, he accused government of favoring Wallachians and discriminating against Moldavians. Speaking for the PNL majority, Dimitrie Sturdza denied the allegation, claiming instead that government clerks were only selected on a meritocratic basis.

A while after, upon observing irregularities during the first-college by-election in Tutova County, Voinov contended that the liberal camp was allowing fraud and intimidation to happen when in power, but complained about such features when in the opposition. In January 1881, he was recruited by Ionescu's new Factionalist group of "moderate liberals from across the Milcov"—closely aligned with Emanoil Protopopescu-Pake and G. Dem. Teodorescu, who put out Binele Public gazette. Its other noted members were Holban, Andrei Vizanti, and Sandu Miclescu.

In May 1881, the newly independent country upgraded itself into a "Kingdom of Romania". Later that year, Voinov was moving closer to the PNL and its fourth Brătianu cabinet. At the time, he was being tipped as the next Justice Minister. On 4 November, Carol (now King of Romania) made Voinov a Commander of the Crown of Romania. In March 1882, Voinov was again pitted against the cabinet, now refusing to support its plan for acquiring and nationalizing a a railway to the sea. Prime Minister Ion C. Brătianu appeared in the Senate to present his case; in his speech, he referred to Voinov's position as "well-meaning and disinterested", but misguided, while promising to the senators that a regular train service would turn Northern Dobruja into "Romania's garden". Voinov also stood against senator Grigore Sturdza, who presided upon his own ultra-conservative party (the National-Democrats), and who wanted special laws for regulating relations between landowners and sharecroppers. Voinov's winning position was that all such labor conflicts needed to be addressed by common-law procedures.

During 1880, while the right-wing forces began coalescing into a Conservative Party, the liberals were again becoming split by regional and ideological loyalties. Much of the old Factionalist group was absorbed by George D. Vernescu's Sincere Liberal Party, which had a moderate anti-PNL stance. In 1882–1883, Voinov and Ștefan C. Șendrea were Vernescu's allies in the Senate; in early 1883, when government proposed amendments to the constitution, with the goal of expanding suffrage, they voted in favor. At the time, Voinov expressed consternation that the Conservatives were opposed to such revisions, "when all people are aware that the electoral law should really be modified." He confronted his old enemy Catargiu, who was now the Conservative leader, with a persiflage in the Senate. As noted by Romanulu, he was now the "flagbearer of the 'independent liberals' in the Senate", though he still rejected claims that Vernescu had taken the Conservatives' side in the dispute. To the right of the Conservatives, G. Sturdza intervened to declare that Voinov wanted to unify the electoral colleges so as to dilute the voting power of the upper classes and the intelligentsia at large. This he viewed as unacceptable, proclaiming it an attack on "the very bones and flesh of our social organism".

In November 1882, Voinov also spoke out against the draft, arguing that forcing Jews to serve under arms would give them grounds for demanding citizenship. The constitutional revision, meanwhile, divided the Sincere Liberal caucus: ahead of the May 1883 election, Vernescu sided with the Catargiu in opposing any changes, and was followed in this by many of the old Factionalists, establishing the Unified Opposition Committees. Voinov himself was moving closer to the establishment. In March 1883, he signed the PNL's electoral manifesto. During the actual election, he was put up by government for an Assembly seat, in Putna's first college. He defeated the Opposition Committees' Ion Prodan, 86 votes to 26. In June, the monarch visited Iași, and invited him to his banquet.

== PNL minister ==
On 16 November 1883, Voinov became the kingdom's (and the PNL's) Justice Minister. This required him to be replaced at the Putna appealate court, with his position there going to Virgiliu Poenaru on 30 November. Immediately after, his work came to be scrutinized by the press, with allegations of favoritism—he stood accused of having downgraded a young magistrate, effectively putting his career on hold, and of having instead promoted a judge whom the appellate court had wanted punished for incompetence. In February 1884, the citizens of Râmnicu Sărat spoke of Voinov as "flouting the judiciary", upon noticing how a judge, appointed by the minister himself, was relocated from the town after only two weeks of service. On the liberal left, C. A. Rosetti praised the minister's measures, arguing that he was fighting against the political bosses' control over magistrates. Rosetti argued that Voinov's courage had helped expose a problem that nobody else dared discuss openly. By then, the inner-PNL divisions were being observed and exploited by a conservative group, Junimea, which was engaged in discreet negotiations with D. Sturdza of the National-Liberal right. As Junimist leader, Petre P. Carp urged Sturdza to rid the party of incompetent figures, from Voinov to Gheorghe Chițu and from Ion I. Câmpineanu to Petre S. Aurelian.

In March 1884, Voinov complained that his project to introduce litigation taxes (to be redirected into a magistrates' salary fund) had been effectively gutted by Senate. In June, he was reportedly contested by liberal students at the University of Bucharest, especially those of Western Moldavian provenance. They wanted him ousted and replaced with Anastase Stolojan. The minister, meanwhile, became involved in overseeing construction works at Ocnele Mari Prison; in August 1884, he signed a ministerial address that proposed denouncing the construction agreement, noting that builders A. Moscovici and M. Littman were not fulfilling their part of the deal. He took a 20-day leave during September and October, when the responsibilities of the post were temporarily assumed by Câmpineanu.

After spending most of that time abroad, Voinov announced the date of his return as 14 October. Brătianu still trusted him. In October, while he mapped out elections under the newly expanded suffrage, the Prime Minister proposed to have Voinov run for the second-colleague Assembly seat in Putna; according to the local paper Vocea Putneĭ, this was also a sign that Voinov was beloved by his Focșani constituents. He took 253 out of 442 votes, emerging as the first-placed deputy for that division. He was also elected for a backup seat in Teleorman County's first college, on a ticket that he shared with Brătianu himself. The latter took 111 votes, placing first; Voinov was a close second, with 108. On 19 November, he opted for the Putna seat.

By December 1884, Voinov was being criticized by his former backer Rosetti. At stake was his having demoted George Alecsianu from his position at the Dolj County tribunal, which carried no official explanation. Voinov resigned from the cabinet shortly after completing a year at the ministry, and on 16 January 1885 was replaced by Câmpineanu (again in an interim capacity). His departure was said by Lupta newspaper to have reflected his controversial status in the government team, and to have then pushed him into the anti-PNL camp. More specifically, Romanulu linked his fall to an election-related scandal: during the campaign climax, physician and deputy Alexandru Cătulescu had been gravely assaulted by the Focșani's police chief, Iorgu Costescu. On 1 February 1885, while walking outside Hotel Hugues of Bucharest, Voinov himself was approached and slapped by a former prosecutor, Emil Mavrocordat. During his subsequent indictment procedures, Mavrocordat argued that Voinov had committed illegal acts, by having him arbitrarily downgraded. Meanwhile, the outrage felt by Voinov led him to announce that he was also resigning as Putna deputy, but his colleagues persuaded him to reconsider. He nonetheless refused to press charges against Mavrocordat, who was exclusively investigated for disorderly conduct.

== Return as PNL opponent ==
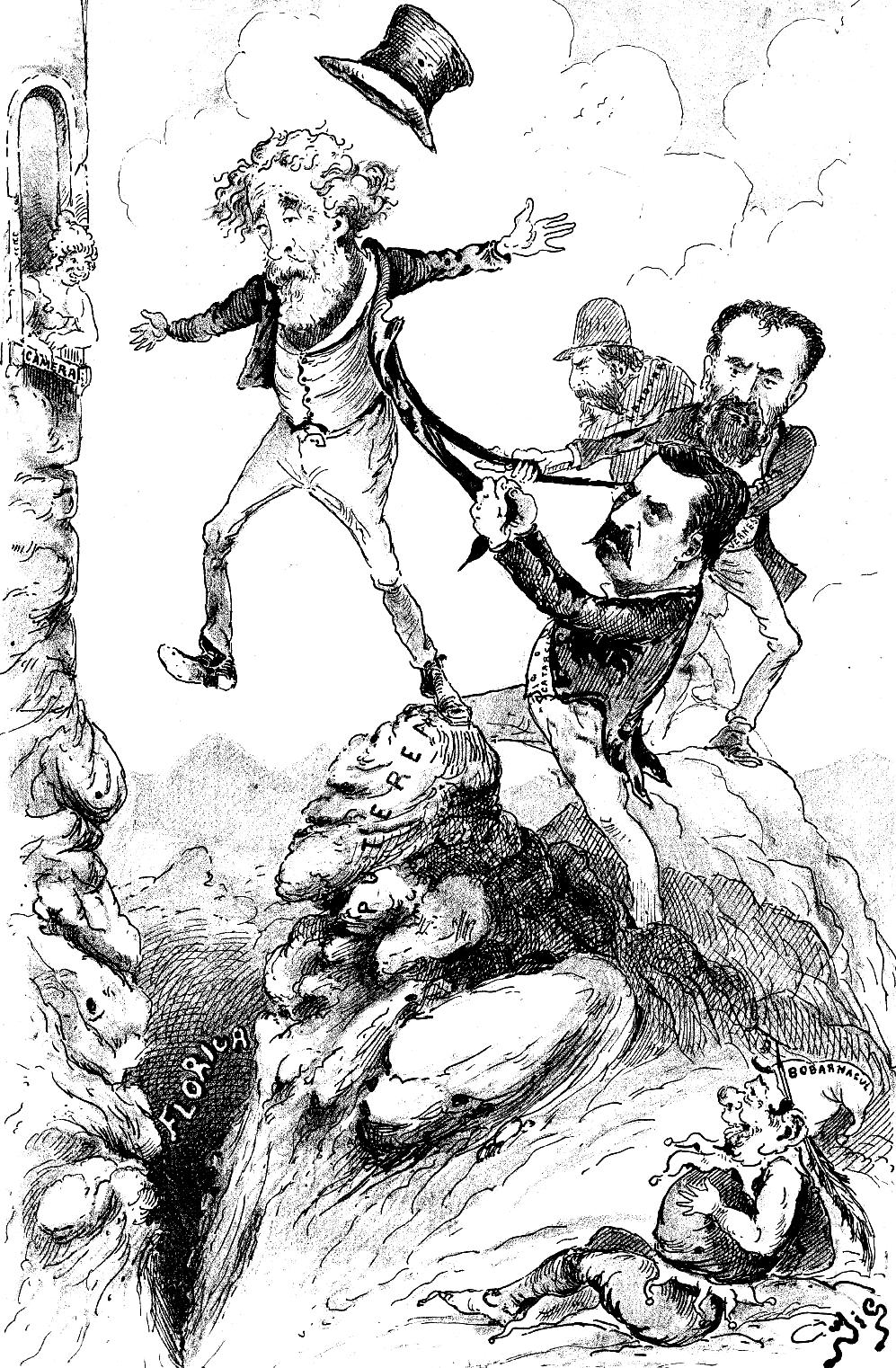
Ion C. Brătianu being held down by the emerging United Opposition (represented here by Lascăr Catargiu, George D. Vernescu, and Alexandru Lahovary). February 1886 cartoon by Constantin Jiquidi

In late 1885, Voinov went public with his critique of the administration. At the time, he alleged that another Focșani's PNL mayor, Nicolae Săveanu, had defrauded the tobacco monopoly. He formulated the charges as a citizen's complaint, registered with the regional prosecutor. By December, Voinov and fellow deputy Iancu Marghiloman were primarily focused on denouncing irregularities at the state railways company. During January 1886, he had a publicized dispute with D. Sturdza, who was handling the department for Religious Affairs. As part of this exchange, he alleged that Romanian Catholics had organized religious schools as an "anti-national" network; Sturdza dismissed these claims as exaggerated and needlessly divisive. Also then, Voinov appeared before his Focșani voters, attacking Brătianu's economic policies. He informed them that the regime had prepared a monopoly on alcohol sales, and was also readying to prolong a commercial treaty with Austria-Hungary. Voinov declared that both these stances were morally bankrupt, and indicated that he would not vote for them as they went before the Assembly. In a contrary move, he agreed to be Costescu's attorney, representing him before a jury court which was set to uphold or reject the policeman's prison sentence.

In January 1886, Voinov came to clash with the ministers, who had proceeded to abolish Focșani's appellate court, moving it to Galați; at the time, he was appearing before that tribunal to defend subprefect Costache Chiva and Adjud mayor Vasile Nădejde, accused of having battered a local Jewish man. In March of that year, he spoke about the court's future in the Assembly, arguing that government was being facetious in claiming that the move to Galați would help Romanianize Northern Dobruja. He declared being "very grieved that, as an ancient member of the liberal party, who has grown old fighting under its banner, he would find himself in the pathetic position of fighting against that very party, which is seeking to deal a fatal blow to Focșani". On 7 March, Putna's deputies gathered in Voinov's home, debating whether they should all resign in protest; the talks were inconclusive. Voinov himself continued to favor mass resignations, and, at a rally in April, suggested that "intransigent candidates" be put up nationally for any new election.

Though his colleagues had returned to the Assembly, Voinov continued to be largely absent from the sessions, prompting the PNL's Constantin M. Ciocazan to inquire whether his seat was not in fact vacant. Cătulescu intervened to assure him that Voinov had agreed to continue working through the Assembly, rather than resigning from it. Returning to his seat by May 1886, the former Factionalist joined Ionescu in sounding the alarm about government's tax hike, opposing in particular any levy on flour and salted fish. In September, after Premier Brătianu had escaped an assassination attempt, Voinov was producing various open letters which claimed that the new Justice Minister, Eugeniu Stătescu, was needlesly politicizing the affair. This stance annoyed the PNL's George Sion, who responded in kind. Sion assessed that Voinov had been a much more controlling and corrupt minister, who had insisted on becoming "the head of [Putna's] goons" at election-time.

In December 1886, Voinov manifested his anger that the treaty with Austria-Hungary was being steamrolled through the Assembly, and could be seen banging his fist on the parliamentary table. By January of the next year, he was participating in meetings held in Marghiloman's Bucharest home. These approached the issue of unification between the radicalized "United Opposition" (OU), which had taken to the streets, and Junimea, which acted as the loyal opposition. Voinov sided with the Junimist Carp in describing the OU as "conspirators", and in rejecting any umbrella alliance. On the OU side, Dumitru Brătianu (the Prime Minister's brother and leading foe) chided him for "talk[ing] like a prosecutor, which is not quite fair." As deputy, Voinov also demanded that a PNL politico, Mihail Pherekyde, be criminally investigated for having provoked the opposition's Nicolae Fleva to a duel (a practice which, though formally outlawed, was tolerated as guided by matters of honor). Stătescu agreed to his demands and ordered such an investigation; however, when the matter passed back to the deputies for approval, Voinov declined to vote on it, and was ridiculed by the PNL press as indecisive and performative.

== Toppling Brătianu ==
During December 1887, Voinov supported the cabinet's proposal to set up an emergency fund for assisting destitute peasants—though he also expected a rider that "would make all malfeasance impossible." General Radu Mihai, as the head of Internal Affairs, took umbrage at his suggestion, claiming that it was an insult aimed at the government, and at Mihai himself. According to the opposition paper L'Indépendence Roumaine, this feigned indignation distracted the Assembly from discussions on the bill. In defiance of Carp's moratorium, various Junimist deputies had by then joined the OU, which acquired an unexpected boost. Alongside Fleva and Gheorghe Mârzescu, Voinov prepared for the January 1888 election, organizing anti-government protests throughout Western Moldavia. As reported on 10 January by Vocea Covurluiuluĭ, his victory was a likely shoe-in, "despite all sabotage by the current administration". Eventually, however, he decided against running for the Assembly, and instead registered himself in scheduled elections for the second senatorial college in Focșani.

Nationally, the Assembly race was only narrowly won by the PNL, and the legislature's split vote only served to deepen the political crisis. On 16 March, after an escalation of violent repression in Bucharest, Voinov signed up to a letter of all opposition leaders in Putna (including fomer enemy D. Nicolaide). This document announced that the Brătianu regime had engineered its own downfall. Days after, Carol stepped in to create a Junimea cabinet, under Theodor Rosetti. On 23 April, after Focșani had dissolved its commune, Voinov and Gheorghe Apostoleanu joined the interim city government. The local elections of June witnessed tactical local alliances between the OU and the Junimists; Voinov himself was backed by both groups for the race in Focșani. Although he was still a public critic of the OU, his subsequent victory was claimed by that group as one of its successes.

During the recall elections in October 1888, Voinov ran in Putna's first college as a "dissident liberal", while his ally Apostoleanu represented the Conservatives. They were both elected—he took 192 votes out of 284. After his victory there, Voinov gave confidence to the second Rosetti cabinet, suggesting that it was fully compatible with his own liberal ideals. At opposition summits held at Bucharest's Hôtel de France, he suggested that, instead of pursuing support from the Conservatives, the Junimists should have sought to obtain some conditional PNL backing. In December, the PNL's organ Voința Națională rejoiced that the right-wing section of Junimea, represented by "the government paper" Epoca, had come to reject Voinov as incompetent.

Over the following weeks, Voinov participated in debates about the repression of newly formed socialist clubs, and about attempts to invalidate the mandate of a far-left deputy, Vasile Morțun; Voinov now stood for universal toleration, objecting to the crackdown. By then, Nicolae and Eliza's adoptive son, Dimitrie Voinov, was acquiring his own fame as a biologist and writer. During his studies at the University of Paris, Dimitrie defied his conservative father by embracing scientific socialism. As a result, Nicolae reduced his allowance. In January 1888, Voinov Sr continued to express regret that the socialists were being chased under Theodor Rosetti's watch, and with Ionescu's approval. Though he noted that socialism had no prospects in Romania ("where there is much land and few laboring hands"), he also insisted that "the socialists will soon be avenged for all these indignities, for even his own son [...] is a socialist." On 19 January 1889, he himself ran for Assembly chairman, but only got one vote out of 130; the office went to Constantin Grădișteanu, with 82 votes.

In March 1889, during a verbal joust with the OU's Ionaș Grădișteanu and Iancu Cozadini. Voinov described Grădișteanu as a client of the Junimists, which his adversary regarded as libel; for his part, Cozadini suggested that Voinov himself had had a "Junimist's evolution". The latter claim was embraced by Lupta editorialist Constantin Bacalbașa, who called out Junimea as a "monstrous party"—with a left-wing populated by Voinov, Constantin Stroici, and other "liberal elements", while the right accommodated "reactionaries", from Nicolae Filipescu to Voinov's foe, Emil Mavrocordat. In April 1889, as Carol appointed a third Catargiu cabinet and forced the other parties to restructure their alliances, Voinov joined the OU. In May, he submitted a bill to have the appellate court moved back from Galați.

== Against Manu ==
The OU now clashed with the Conservatives, and Voinov followed suit. In June 1889, he interrupted a speech by the Conservative Nicolae Blaremberg, in a manner that Blaremberg viewed as excessively rude. Instead of continuing with his main arguments, the speaker focused his ire on Voinov, alleging that, as minister, he had "ordered the soldiers to shoot down our youths, in the streets", and mocking his liberalism as both pretentious and cynical; reporting on this, Adevărul newspaper joined in, adding that Voinov was a "political eunuch" (scapet politic). Voința Națională observed that Blaremberg had met Voinov with other, stronger, words of scorn, including Să taci, canalie ("Be quiet, you scumbag"). The incident was also mentioned by Romanulu, who saw it as a nadir of Romanian parliamentarism.

During November 1889, Voinov presented himself in the race for the Assembly's vice presidency, but withdrew, worrying that the Conservatives would not accept him. According to a Junimist tribute, he directed his peers to vote for Holban, who ended up as the winner. Lupta derided such initiatives, arguing that Voinov was in every way one of Carp's visible clients, and as such a "lateral Junimist". Also then, Voinov was in the loyal opposition to the Conservatives' Manu cabinet; his relationship with Gheorghe Manu, reportedly soured around March 1889, since the Prime Minister wanted Nicolaide as his Putna prefect. Lupta claimed at the time that, though Carp had ordered him to be his rapporteur on the national budget, Voinov only prepared a "minuscule report", and did not show up in the Assembly to read it himself (it was finally read out by Teodor Nica).

In May 1889, Voinov also fought against making Rucăr into an urban commune, noting that this apparent upgrade would also lift restrictions on its settlement by Jews. He claimed that intermediary towns were already "flooded with Jews", and that "most of Rucăr's properties will end up in Hebrew hands, just like that." Ahead of local elections in November 1890, he organized rallies in Putna; Adevărul claims that he focused on supporting the OU's incumbent councilors, even though they had rarely showed up for work. In that context, he reported being threatened by a government man, with the words: "I'll break your bones". On 22 November, as Catargiu used his time in the Assembly to ridicule the Junimist project as "people with no party", Voinov stepped in to answer. He defined the Conservatives as "reactionaries" who had only absorbed portions of the PNL as a ruse; he also defined Junimea as truly liberal, since it "remains grounded in constitutionalism". He nonetheless opposed a game law advanced by the Junimist Stroici, since he saw it as catered to upper-class interests. He described himself as an instinctual defender of "the rural folk".

While helping to establish a Putna chapter of the nationalist Cultural League for the Unity of All Romanians, Voinov sided with Ionescu in criticizing Bucharest for its centralism. In one of his speeches, he observed that Manu's cabinet had no Moldavian ministers, and that Manu himself had almost no interest in Moldavian affairs. In January 1891, Constantin Langa's new group, the League for the Defense of Moldavia's Interests, invited Voinov, Catargiu, Kogălniceanu, and other "distinguished Moldavians" to attend its banquet in Iași, which also doubled as a rally in support of administrative devolution. Langa's journal, Ecoul Moldoveĭ, admiringly cited Voinov's belief that Wallachia was treating Moldavia as a conquered province, rather than as an equal, by having non-natives appointed to most government offices. Censured as "separatists" by the Conservative press, Voinov and Ionescu were congratulated by Adevărul's Alexandru Beldiman. The PNL papers, which also noted that Cozadini had joined in Voinov's protest, argued that they had set a dangerous precedent, and had opened the way for "foreigners" to undermine the kingdom's unity.

== With Junimea ==
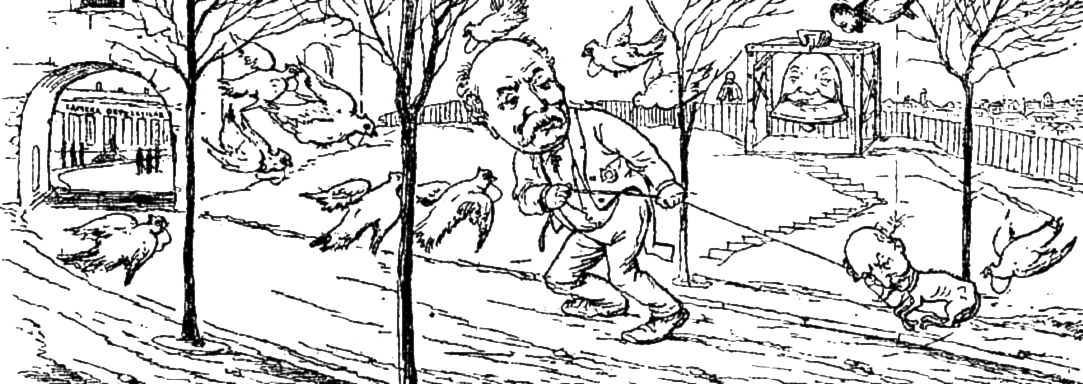
Haĭ la deal, Samurache! ("Let's you and I go uphill, pooch!"), in an 1893 cartoon by Jiquidi. Lascăr Catargiu as the master, Junimist speaker Petre P. Carp as his lapdog, pulled up the slope of Dealul Mitropoliei to support the government

The Conservative Florescu cabinet called for legislative elections in April 1891. In addition to running again as deputy (against a tactical alliance between government men and the local PNL), Voinov was a delegate of Putna's peasant voters, in an all-opposition sweep of that college. On 11 April, he also won the one of the Assembly's first-college seats, with 192 votes; Nicolae Săveanu of the PNL came in second, with 183. On 21 June, he spoke in the Assembly about Kogălniceanu's death, calling him a "great patriot" and asking for the session to be suspended as a sign of grief. From mid-1891, Voinov was finally recruited by Junimea—in its political avatar, the "Constitutional Party", which was led by Carp. Late that year, the fourth Catargiu cabinet was installed, with Carp's support, and with a view to merging the Constitutionalists and the Conservatives as one party. Voinov followed the trend: already in August, his opponents in Focșani reported that he and the Conservative chapter had agreed on restoring Nicolaide as prefect. Adevărul also claimed that the new subprefect, A. Cristodorescu, was Voinov's godson and tenant farmer, and that the Focșani mayor, Dumitru Țanu Vidrașcu, was his "trusted man", within a political machine.

In December, Voinov participated in the 6-man Junimist conclave which decided on the party's strategy against detractors from the PNL. With new elections in February 1892, he was again sent to the Assembly by Putna's first college—Lupta and Universul referred to him as a government-backed candidate. Late that month, he was the Junimist proposal for the governmental arc's bureau in the Assembly, but vetoed by Catargiu's men. In June 1892, at the height of the "Transylvanian Memorandum" affair, Voinov led nationalist rallies in Focșani, protesting for the rights of Romanians in the Hungarian realm. Adevărul reports that, by September 1892, he and Constantin A. Ressu were considering the creation of an "Anti-Catargiu League", made up of disgruntled Conservatives and ambitious Junimists. Voinov continued to involve himself in debates about naturalization, and, in December 1892, asked the Assembly to reject Lazăr Mărculescu's bid for citizenship. He claimed that Mărculescu, a Jewish man, "only wanted the right of nativity so as to draw a pension."

Tensions between Voinov and the Catargiu government were apparent in January 1893: he was visibly upset by the cabinet's invitation to attend a gala at the National Theater Bucharest, since it presumed that he and all other deputies would take second-rate seats in the parterre. Days later, Voinov and Ressu questioned Catargiu's project for expanding the Gendarmerie, describing it as an attempt to facilitate voter intimidation in future elections. Voinov also stood up to Carp's proposal for a legal revision that would have added rights for non-naturalized Jews, but met strong opposition from his own camp; at the time, Voinov sided with the young antisemite A. C. Cuza in filibustering against the Carp bill. In April, Voinov and Ressu were mildly opposed to the Junimist tax hikes (which elevated taxes on locally produced items to where they matched tariffs). Voinov advised for a postponement of the bill, observing that its consequences would touch the entire country. When a tax riot broke out in Bucharest, he reportedly sought refuge at a police station.

Also in April 1893, Voinov criticized Carp's insistence on making tax and free-trade policies central to the cabinet agenda; his intervention was furiously interrupted by Nicolae Filipescu, the Conservative deputy and Mayor of Bucharest. Filipescu declared Voinov a man of unusual "political versatility", and an infiltrator in the parliamentary majority. In November 1894, the PNL's Barbu Ștefănescu Delavrancea, who had come to deride ideological divisions, made a similar point about Voinov. While calling Voinov a "man of value", Delavrancea pressed him to admit that he had asked Focșani's voters to vote for Catargiu, without ever adopting the "Conservative" label for himself. At the time, the Putna deputy was embracing economic liberalism in line with Carp's: when a government project to privatize the tannery in Bucovăț came up for vote in the Assembly, he campaigned for it, reportedly stating that "there is no worse manager than the state".

== Final years ==
In October 1894, Carol assigned the premiership to the PNL's Dimitrie Sturdza, who inaugurated his first cabinet. Junimea was in the opposition for the November election; Voinov and Dumitru Simionescu-Râmniceanu stood as its candidates for Senate's first college in Putna, their homes allegedly watched by police agents. They both lost to a PNL list headed by Săveanu. Voinov was by then a widower, Eliza having died while traveling abroad, in July 1889. Upon his own return to Romania, Dimitrie won a professorship at the University of Iași (November 1892); he also fathered a son, Réné, who died in April 1894, at the age of four.

Still active with the Constitutionalists as head of their Putna action committee (from February 1896), Voinov was twice rewarded for his services to the state—he was an officer of the Star of Romania and had been promoted to grand officer of the Crown of Romania. In late March 1896, he welcomed Carp for a banquet in Focșani. He presented himself in by-elections for the senatorial seat in January 1897, but was defeated by a PNL man, I. F. Robescu. In November 1897, he assisted in the prosecution of Gheorghe Vaianț, accused of having terrorized voters on Săveanu's orders.

In December 1897, after Putna senator George Orleanu had unexpectedly died, Voinov announced that he would run for the vacant seat. The race, which took place on 13 January 1898, saw him losing to the PNL's George G. Meitani, 139 votes to 106. Later that year, he was elected dean of the Putna bar and represented in court the Adevărul staff, accused of libel by the PNL industrialist Radu Porumbaru. Although a leftist, Voinov Jr was by then marginally active at Junimea, joining the editorial board of its magazine, Convorbiri Literare, just before the close of 1899. He supported and popularized Darwinism, which was also endorsed by the Junimea cultural ideologue, Titu Maiorescu.

Voinov Sr was predeceased by another grandson, the eight-year-old Toto, in March 1899. At the time, Nicolae was preparing another first-college Assembly run, for the scheduled election. The count, published on 28 May, saw him taking the next-to-last position, with 69 votes out of 551. Voinov died on 29 May while visiting Dimitrie in Bucharest; these circumstances required that his body be transported for burial at Focșani. The cause of death was not precisely indicated, though reports either mention a "brief suffering" or explain that he had been "ill for some time". Some of the documents that detail his 1850s work as a unionist are displayed at the Focșani Museum of the Union. Known as a collector of medieval and early modern Moldavian manuscripts, he had donated several of these to the National Museum in 1884.
