= 1892 Romanian general election =

- February–March 1892

All 112 eligible seats in the Senate All 183 seats in the Assembly of Deputies
- Turnout: 68.1% (Senate); 68.6% (Assembly)
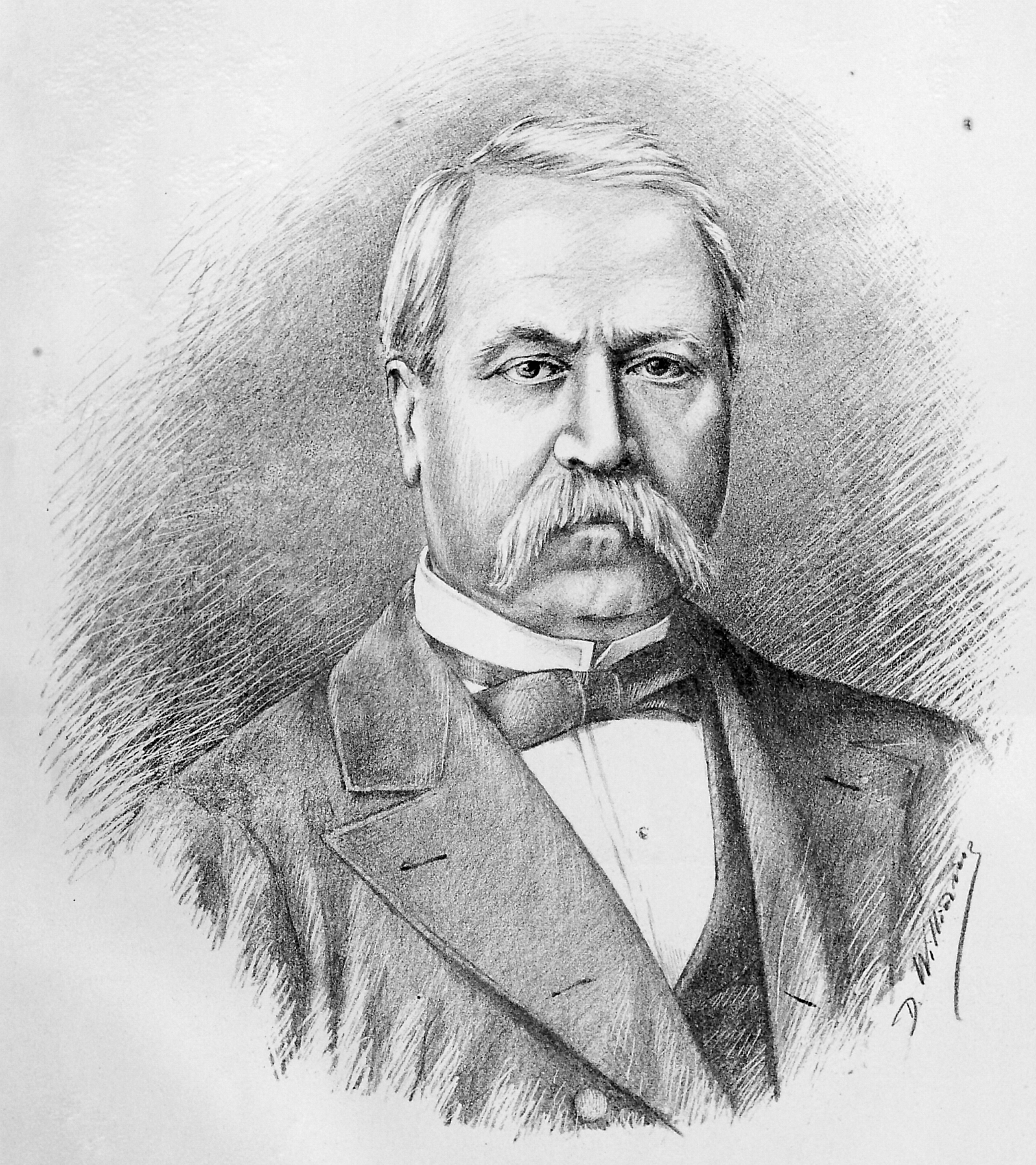

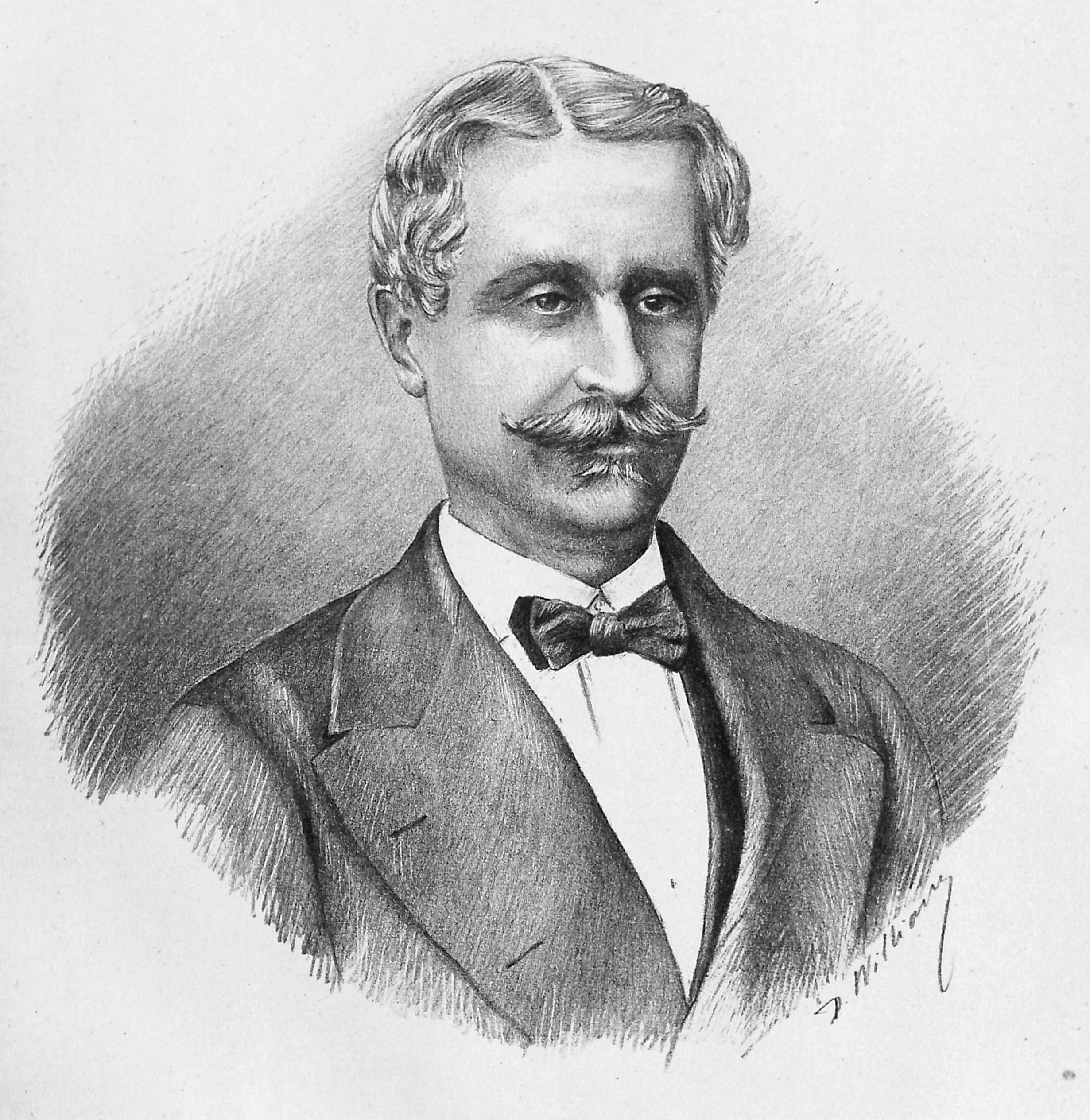
	Majority party	Minority party
Leader	Lascăr Catargiu	Dimitrie Brătianu
Party	Consolidated Conservative	PNL
Leader since	1880	1891
Seats won	205 (148 in the Assembly)	≈50 (32–35 in the Assembly)
Seat change	▲	▼

General elections were held in the Kingdom of Romania in February–March 1892, ending in a major victory for the incumbent Conservative Party cabinet. The elections reunited the mainstream Conservatives, under Prime Minister Lascăr Catargiu, with the breakaway Junimea faction. The cabinet which organized and won the election, then governed to 1895, reunited three doyens of Romanian conservatism: Catargiu, Petre P. Carp, and Take Ionescu. All three represented the political line most favored by Carol I, King of Romania.

The elections for both Assembly and Senate were unusually free in their historical context, but still noted for their various irregularities. The Opposition, led by the National Liberal Party (PNL), was poorly prepared for the race, having failed to reunite around a common platform.

The years 1891–1893 witnessed the defeat and passing of a liberal founders' generation, under brothers Ion and Dimitrie Brătianu, and the ascendancy of a new party elite, under Dimitrie Sturdza. This interval was used by Carp for the advancement of various fiscal and administrative reforms, some of which were violently resisted by the middle- and lower-class population. The period also rekindled debates about the census suffrage, contributing to the emergence of a small Social Democratic Workers' Party in 1893.

== Context ==
During most of 1891, Romania had a "Liberal Conservative Party" cabinet headed by Ioan Emanoil Florescu, but maneuvered by Catargiu, the Interior Minister; it was supported in the Assembly by George D. Vernescu and his "Sincere Liberal" group, which had torn itself off from the PNL. According to cultural historian Z. Ornea, Vernescu had "poisoned his relations with the [national] liberals to such a degree that, unable to return into the fold, he made it his mission to take up a comfortable and authoritative seat on the leadership of the conservative party." The Junimea society had by then drifted away from Catargiu's party, declaring their incompatibility with Vernescu, as well as with Catargiu's left-wing partner, George Panu. From June 1889, the Junimists under Titu Maiorescu where an autonomous "Constitutional Party", formed around the newspapers Epoca and România Liberă. The Catargiu–Florescu alliance had replaced another Conservative cabinet, headed by General Gheorghe Manu, and conditionally supported by Junimea. The latter's fall had marked the definitive divorce between the Conservatives and Junimea: as Minister of Education, Maiorescu had failed to pass his law on schooling reform, and had withdrawn the Constitutionalists from the coalition.

Lacking Junimist support, Florescu's administration won the elections of April 1891 with an inconsistent majority. The PNL-led Opposition had 60 of 183 deputies, including 7 Junimists and Vasile Morțun, the maverick socialist. However, they also signified a defeat for prominent PNL figures: Panu, Nicolae Fleva, and party leader Ion Brătianu, who died soon after this personal deception.

In early November, Florescu's coalition fell apart: King Carol I and various Conservative politicians demanded Vernescu's expulsion, and a "Conservative concentration"—that is to say, an ideologically coherent government, with the inclusion of Junimea delegates. Conflicts also erupted between Catargiu and Vernescu, over the appointment of Nicolae Moret Blaremberg as Minister of Justice, and over Vernescu's vetoing of Catargist candidates in the parliamentary bureaus. The government was split by other historic rivalries—Florescu and Pache Protopopescu, the Mayor of Bucharest, had both defected from Vernescu's party, and only had conditional support from Catargiu. At the time, Protopopescu resigned from his post, giving Vernescu a token victory.

On November 18, Catargiu, Iacob Lahovary and Constantin Olănescu resigned from the cabinet, leaving Florescu without parliamentary backing. Florescu attempted to present the king with a reformed cabinet, but was snubbed by the latter; Catargiu was given a mandate to form his cabinet, which took office nine days later. On December 9, however, a consolidated opposition of PNL and "Sincere Liberal" parliamentarians passed a motion of no confidence. The king called in early elections, but obtained from Catargiu a promise to form the "Conservative consolidation" before that time. He refused to consider a PNL cabinet under Dimitrie Sturdza, because he felt that the party was in disarray after Brătianu's death, and also because Catargiu, unlike many of the PNL doctrinaires, fully endorsed Romania's participation in the Triple Alliance.

On November 15, Catargiu had visited Maiorescu in his home, for the first time in over a decade of mutual antipathy. The consolidation pact was sealed by December 12, when the Catargiu cabinet came to include three Junimists: Petre P. Carp, Menelas Ghermani, and Alexandru Marghiloman; also joining the team, and weakening the Opposition, was a popular former PNL cadre, Take Ionescu.

== Campaign and results ==
By February 13, the government had presented its comprehensive program: "It promises various welcome reforms, such as the improvement of fortunes for the small landowners and industrialists, the immovability of judges, the reorganization of sanitation services, a partial reorganization of the army, possibly the reduction of tariffs, and education reform." This move prompted the various liberal factions to speed up their own merger, although, as noted by Conservative journalist Constantin Bacalbașa, they were "taken up by surprise, disorganized, [...] divided into four factions, with no single government platform."

The elections were widely seen as marred by irregularities, and to some degree fraudulent. According to Bacalbașa: "as always in Romania, the administration's pressures [on the voters] ran very high." However, Ornea suggests that they were overall "free elections", "more relaxed" that usual, and offering genuine legitimacy to the consolidation cabinet. A total 68,295 voters were registered for the Assembly, with 57,766 (85%) in the 2nd and 3rd Colleges—of low- and medium-income electors. 46,880, or 68.6% voted, of which 2.6% were blank or invalid ballots. There were 16,406 voters registered for Senate, with 9,120 (55.5%) in the 2nd (and last) College. 11,188, or 68.1%, cast their votes, with 1.6% of these being blank or invalid ballots.

The result was an uncontested majority for the Conservatives and the Junimists. Following the first round of February, 137 of 183 deputies were with the Catargiu majority, and 27 with the Opposition; 19 more sections were left to settle during ballotage in March. Writer Radu Rosetti, a protégé of Catargiu's, was among those reelected, after defeating Radu Ralea in an intense campaign at Fălciu County's 3rd College. Conservative winners also included A. C. Cuza, the former socialist and Junimist, emerging as an antisemitic doctrinaire, who took his first mandate in the Assembly.

Five more candidates of the PNL-led alliance won seats in the lower chamber during ballotage; they were joined by three independents, who caucused with the Opposition. One of these was the "peasant deputy", Constantin Dobrescu-Argeș. In Senate, the government counted on 57 supporters to 17, from a total of 112 eligible senators (8 more were appointed by the Romanian Orthodox Church). Most factional leaders, including Vernescu, Panu, Dimitrie Brătianu, Eugeniu Stătescu, and Petre S. Aurelian, were elected to either Assembly or Senate. An exception was George D. Pallade, who lost, for the first time in his career, at Bârlad.

== Aftermath ==
The "Conservative concentration" was unique in its era, in that it provided political stability under a Conservative cabinet—variously described as a "barely disguised Junimist government" or a Conservative coalition "on the basis of Junimist principles." Virtually unopposed in the Assembly, the Catargiu administration was able to push through Carp's reforms. This was tested immediately by the votes for Assembly and Senate Presidents, going to General Manu and G. G. Catacuzino, respectively. The Catargiu–Carp partnership ran a full term in office, to 1895—the first such Conservative cabinet since 1871, and the last one in history. According to Bacalbașa, it should be seen as "one of Romania's most competent and most civilized"—functioning so despite the mutual resentment between its two leaders. As noted by Ornea, the cabinet was primarily kept because it guaranteed the preservation of Carol's foreign policy.

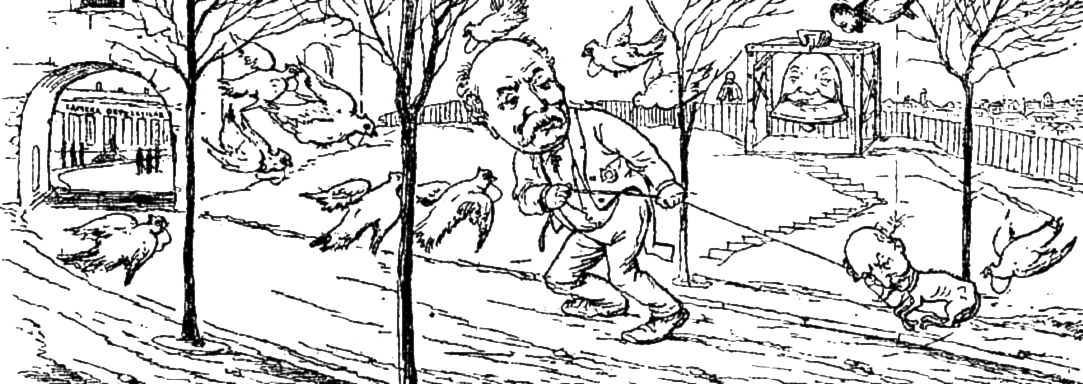
Haĭ la deal, Samurache! ("Let's you and I go uphill, pooch!"), Constantin Jiquidi cartoon published in Moftul Român on March 16, 1893. Premier Lascăr Catargiu as the master, Junimist speaker Petre P. Carp as his lapdog, pulled up the slope of Dealul Mitropoliei to support the government.

D. Brătianu, who had taken over the PNL leadership from his deceased brother, also died in June 1892, leaving the party to be run and reorganized by Sturdza. Although the Catargiu regime was unusually stable, the Opposition mustered enough support to sabotage some of Carp's laws. Carp's move to overtax rural industries and make them support administrative decentralization infuriated the populace. In April 1893, instigated by Sturdza, wagoners and artisans blocked the entrance to Parliament on Dealul Mitropoliei; by 1894, these disturbances erupted into full-blown riots in various parts of the country. Slowly turning toward ethnic and economic nationalism, especially so during the Transylvanian Memorandum affair of 1892, Sturdza put up "a sustained effort [...] to overturn the Conservative government. The next three years were by all accounts one of the most tumultuous periods in the history of Romanian political parties between the achievement of independence and the First World War."

The PNL, meanwhile, became more open toward proposals for electoral reform, which came from the party's left-wing. In November 1892, promises for a gradual change in this area were included in the new PNL program, published at Iași. Overall, however, the PNL's leadership rejected the concept of universal suffrage, and looked into more moderate alternatives. As historian Sorin Radu argues: "the PNL was agitating for electoral reform especially when it was in the opposition, when it could promise a lot of things, but once in power it found reasons not to live up to such promises."

The opportunity was seized in 1893 by a smaller anti-establishment group, the Romanian Social Democratic Workers' Party (PSDMR), which introduced universal suffrage among its core demands. With Morțun among its founders, the PSDMR emerged from the fusion of socialist clubs, adopting a localized variant of the Erfurt Program as its platform. Two years later, Dobrescu-Argeș also set up his very own "Peasants' Party", the first entirely agrarian political group in Romanian history, and significant for opposing both the National Liberals and the Conservatives.
