= Third Lascăr Catargiu cabinet =

Romanian government cabinet

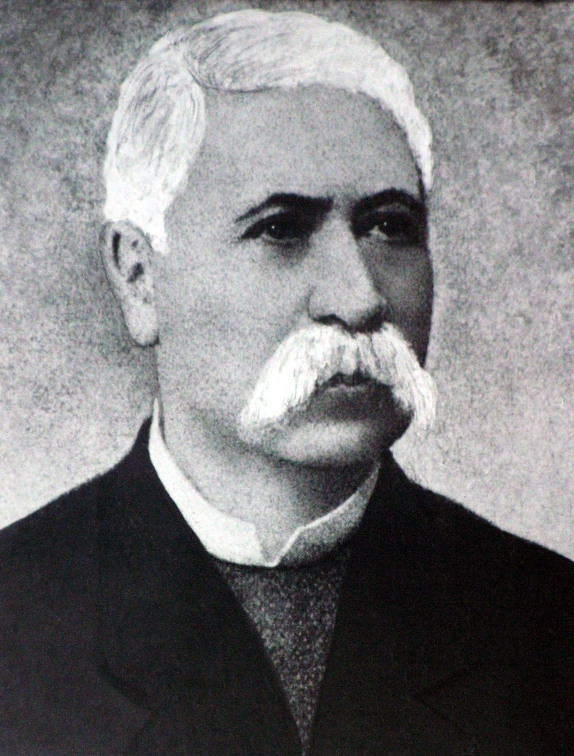
Lascăr Catargiu

The third cabinet of Lascăr Catargiu was the government of Romania from 29 March to 3 November 1889.

== Composition ==
The ministers of the cabinet were as follows:

- President of the Council of Ministers:

- Lascăr Catargiu (29 March - 3 November 1889)

- Minister of the Interior:

- Lascăr Catargiu (29 March - 3 November 1889)

- Minister of Foreign Affairs:

- Alexandru Lahovary (29 March - 3 November 1889)

- Minister of Finance:

- George Vernescu (29 March - 3 November 1889)

- Minister of Justice:

- Nicolae Gherassi (29 March - 3 November 1889)

- Minister of War:

- Gen. George Manu (29 March - 3 November 1889)

- Minister of Religious Affairs and Public Instruction:

- Constantin Boerescu (29 March - 3 November 1889)

- Minister of Public Works:

- (interim) Alexandru Lahovary (29 March - 3 November 1889)

- Minister of Agriculture, Industry, Commerce, and Property:

- Grigore Păucescu (29 March - 3 November 1889)

Preceded by Second Rosetti cabinet	Cabinet of Romania; 29 March 1889 - 3 November 1889	Succeeded by Manu cabinet
