= Second Florescu cabinet =

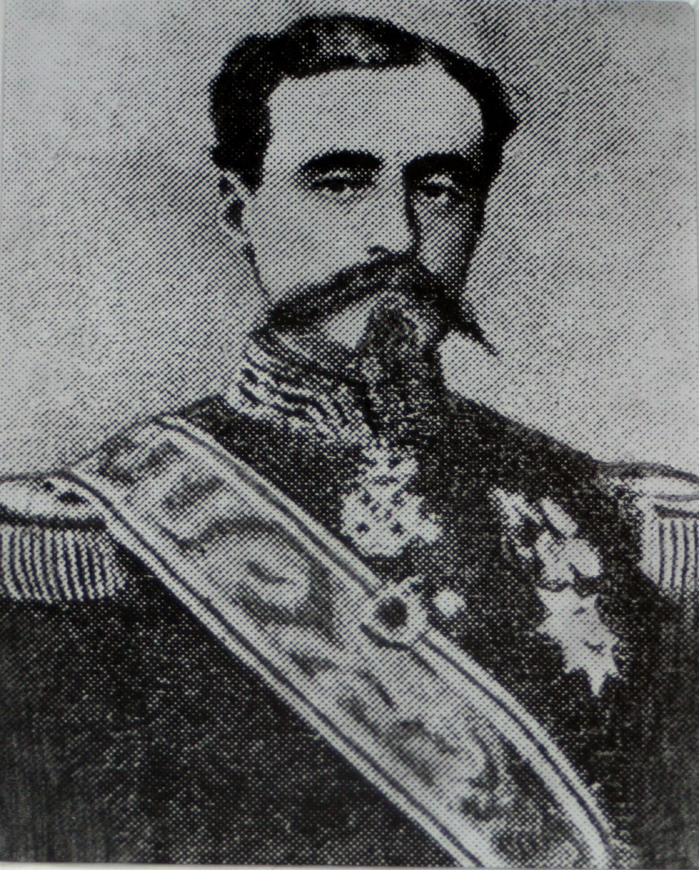
Ioan Emanoil Florescu

The second cabinet of Ioan Emanoil Florescu was the government of Romania from 21 February to 26 November 1891.

== Composition ==
The ministers of the cabinet were as follows:

- President of the Council of Ministers:

- Gen. Ioan Emanoil Florescu (21 February - 26 November 1891)

- Minister of the Interior:

- Lascăr Catargiu (21 February - 26 November 1891)

- Minister of Foreign Affairs:

- Constantin Esarcu (21 February - 26 November 1891)

- Minister of Finance:

- George Vernescu (21 February - 26 November 1891)

- Minister of Justice:

- Alexandru Marghiloman (21 February - 2 November 1891)
- Nicolae Blaremberg (2 - 26 November 1891)

- Minister of War:

- Gen. Iacob Lahovary (21 February - 26 November 1891)

- Minister of Religious Affairs and Public Instruction:

- George Dem. Teodorescu (21 February - 21 July 1891)
- Petru Poni (21 July - 26 November 1891)

- Minister of Public Works:

- Constantin Olănescu (21 February - 26 November 1891)

- Minister of Agriculture, Industry, Commerce, and Property:

- Ilariu Isvoranu (21 February - 3 November 1891)
- Alexandru Vericeanu (3 - 26 November 1891)

Preceded by Manu cabinet	Cabinet of Romania; 21 February 1891 - 26 November 1891	Succeeded by Fourth Lascăr Catargiu cabinet
