= Manu cabinet =

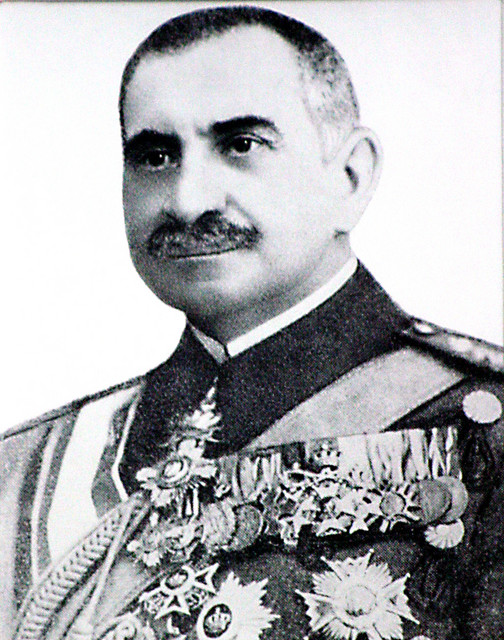
Gheorghe Manu

The cabinet of Gheorghe Manu was the government of Romania from 5 November 1889 to 15 February 1891.

== Composition ==
The ministers of the cabinet were as follows:

- President of the Council of Ministers:

- Gheorghe Manu (5 November 1889 - 15 February 1891)

- Minister of the Interior:

- Gheorghe Manu (5 November 1889 - 15 February 1891)

- Minister of Foreign Affairs:

- Alexandru Lahovary (5 November 1889 - 15 February 1891)

- Minister of Finance:

- Menelas Ghermani (5 November 1889 - 15 February 1891)

- Minister of Justice:

- Theodor Rosetti (5 November 1889 - 16 November 1890)
- Grigore Triandafil (16 November 1890 - 15 February 1891)

- Minister of War:

- Gen. Matei Vlădescu (5 November 1889 - 15 February 1891)

- Minister of Religious Affairs and Public Instruction:

- (interim) Theodor Rosetti (5 - 16 November 1889)
- Titu Maiorescu (16 November 1889 - 15 February 1891)

- Minister of Agriculture, Industry, Commerce, and Property:

- Grigore Păucescu (5 November 1889 - 16 November 1890)
- Alexandru Marghiloman (16 November 1890 - 15 February 1891)

- Minister of Public Works:

- Alexandru Marghiloman (5 - 16 November 1889)
- (interim) Titu Maiorescu (16 November 1889 - 15 February 1891)

Preceded by Third Lascăr Catargiu cabinet	Cabinet of Romania; 5 November 1889 - 15 February 1891	Succeeded by Second Florescu cabinet
