= Second Rosetti cabinet =

Romanian government cabinet

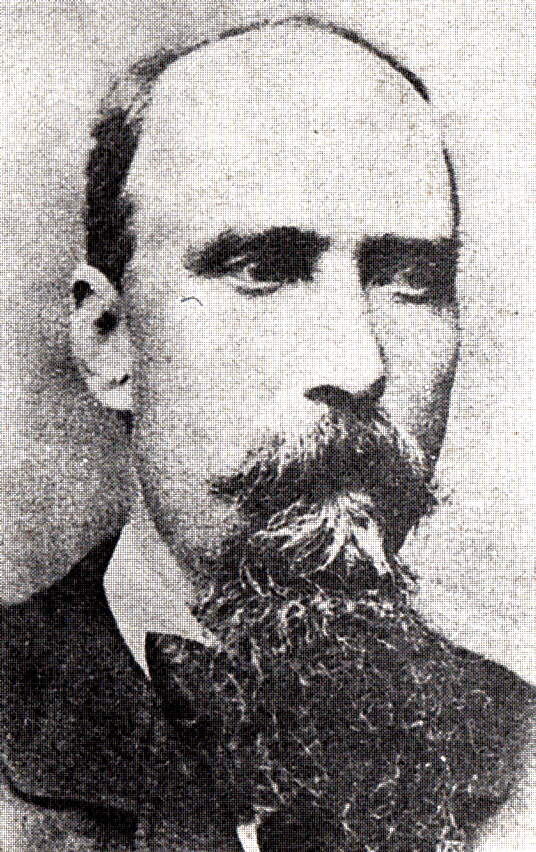
Theodor Rosetti

The second cabinet of Theodor Rosetti was the government of Romania from 12 November 1888 to 22 March 1889.

== Composition ==
The ministers of the cabinet were as follows:

- President of the Council of Ministers:

- Theodor Rosetti (12 November 1888 - 22 March 1889)

- Minister of the Interior:

- Alexandru B. Știrbei (12 November 1888 - 22 March 1889)

- Minister of Foreign Affairs:

- Petre P. Carp (12 November 1888 - 22 March 1889)

- Minister of Finance:

- Menelas Ghermani (12 November 1888 - 22 March 1889)

- Minister of Justice:

- George Vernescu (12 November 1888 - 22 March 1889)

- Minister of War:

- Gen. George Manu (12 November 1888 - 22 March 1889)

- Minister of Religious Affairs and Public Instruction:

- Titu Maiorescu (12 November 1888 - 22 March 1889)

- Minister of Public Works:

- Alexandru Marghiloman (12 November 1888 - 22 March 1889)

- Minister of Agriculture, Trade, Industry and Commerce:

- Alexandru Lahovary (12 November 1888 - 22 March 1889)

Preceded by First Rosetti cabinet	Cabinet of Romania; 12 November 1888 - 22 March 1889	Succeeded by Third Lascăr Catargiu cabinet
