= Fourth Ion C. Brătianu cabinet =

Romanian government cabinet

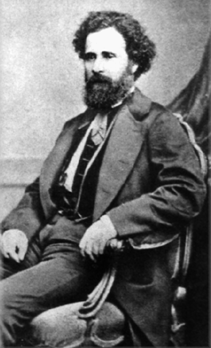
Ion C. Brătianu

The fourth cabinet of Ion C. Brătianu ruled Romania from 9 June 1881 to 20 March 1888.

== Composition ==
The ministers of the cabinet were as follows:

- President of the Council of Ministers:

- Ion C. Brătianu (9 June 1881 - 20 March 1888)

- Minister of the Interior:

- C. A. Rosetti (9 June 1881 - 25 January 1882)
- Ion C. Brătianu (25 January - 1 August 1882)
- Gheorghe Chițu (1 August 1882 - 23 June 1884)
- Ion C. Brătianu (23 June 1884 - 29 April 1887)
- Gen. Radu Mihai (29 April 1887 - 1 March 1888)
- (interim) Constantin Nacu (1 - 20 March 1888)

- Minister of Foreign Affairs:

- Eugeniu Stătescu (9 June 1881 - 1 August 1882)
- Dimitrie Sturdza (1 August 1882 - 2 February 1885)
- Ion I. Câmpineanu (2 February - 28 October 1885)
- (interim) Ion C. Brătianu (28 October - 16 December 1885)
- Mihail Pherekyde (16 December 1885 - 20 March 1888)

- Minister of Finance:

- Ion C. Brătianu (9 June - 1 December 1881)
- Gheorghe Chițu (1 December 1881 - 25 January 1882)
- Gheorghe Lecca (25 January 1882 - 13 September 1885)
- (interim) Constantin Nacu (13 September - 16 December 1885)
- Constantin Nacu (16 December 1885 - 1 March 1888)
- Dimitrie Sturdza (1 - 20 March 1888)

- Minister of Justice:

- Mihail Pherekyde (9 June - 16 November 1881)
- (interim) Eugeniu Stătescu (16 November 1881 - 25 January 1882)
- Gheorghe Chițu (25 January - 1 August 1882)
- Eugeniu Stătescu (1 August 1882 - 30 September 1883)
- (interim) Gheorghe Chițu (30 September - 15 November 1883)
- Nicolae Voinov (15 November 1883 - 14 January 1885)
- (interim) Ion I. Câmpineanu (14 January - 2 February 1885)
- Constantin Nacu (2 February - 16 December 1885)
- Eugeniu Stătescu (16 December 1885 - 1 March 1888)
- Dimitrie Gianni (1 - 20 March 1888)

- Minister of War:

- (interim) Ion C. Brătianu (9 June - 1 December 1881)
- Ion C. Brătianu (1 December 1881 - 25 January 1882)
- Gen. Gheorghe Angelescu (25 January - 1 August 1882)
- Ion C. Brătianu (1 August 1882 - 23 June 1884)
- Gen. Ștefan Fălcoianu (23 June 1884 - 13 January 1886)
- (interim) Ion C. Brătianu (13 January - 21 February 1886)
- Gen. Alexandru Anghelescu (21 February 1886 - 5 November 1887)
- (interim) Ion C. Brătianu (5 November 1887 - 20 March 1888)

- Minister of Religious Affairs and Public Instruction:

- V. A. Urechia (9 June 1881 - 1 August 1882)
- Petre S. Aurelian (1 August 1882 - 23 June 1884)
- Gheorghe Chițu (23 June 1884 - 2 February 1885)
- Dimitrie Sturdza (2 February 1885 - 1 March 1888)
- Constantin Nacu (1 - 20 March 1888)

- Minister of Public Works:

- Gen. Nicolae Dabija (9 June 1881 - 1 August 1884)
- (interim) Dimitrie Sturdza (1 August 1884 - 2 February 1885)
- Gen. Radu Mihai (2 February 1885 - 29 April 1887)
- Petre S. Aurelian (29 April 1887 - 20 March 1888)

- Minister of Agriculture, Trade, Industry and Commerce:

- Ion I. Câmpineanu (1 April 1883 - 2 February 1885)
- Anastase Stolojan (2 February 1885 - 17 October 1886)
- (interim) Ion C. Brătianu (17 October 1886 - 29 April 1887)
- Vasile Gheorghian (29 April 1887 - 1 March 1888)
- Nicolae Gane (1 - 20 March 1888)

Preceded by Dimitrie Brătianu cabinet	Cabinet of Romania; 9 June 1881 - 20 March 1888	Succeeded by First Rosetti cabinet
