= Nicolae Gherassi =

Romanian lawyer and politician

Nicolae Gherassi (18 September 1826 – 28 April 1898) was a Romanian lawyer and politician.

After studying law in France, Gherassi returned to his native country, where he entered the magistracy. Eventually, he came to plead cases before the High Court of Cassation and Justice. He ceased practicing law in 1883.

Initially a political ally of George D. Vernescu, he later joined the Conservative Party, serving as deputy and senator. He was Justice Minister under Lascăr Catargiu from March to November 1889, subsequently leaving politics.
