= Fourth Lascăr Catargiu cabinet =

Romanian government ministry in the 1890s

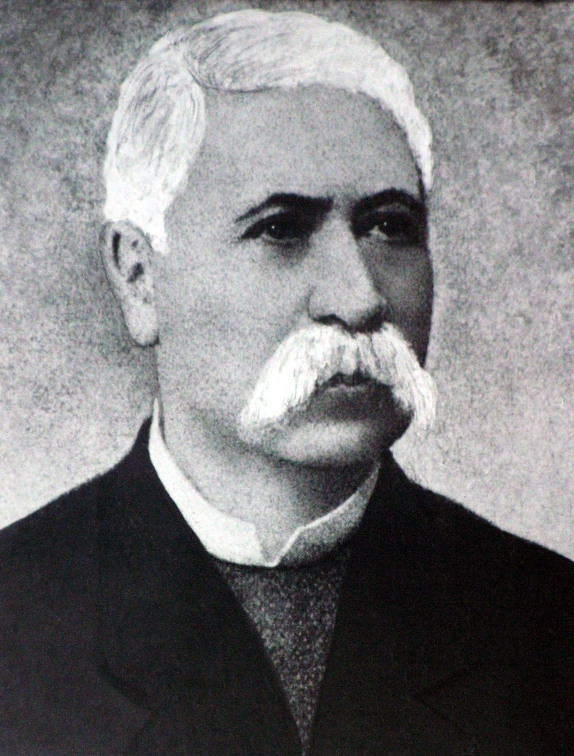
Lascăr Catargiu

The fourth cabinet of Lascăr Catargiu was the government of Romania from 27 November 1891 to 3 October 1895.

== Composition ==
The ministers of the cabinet were as follows:

- President of the Council of Ministers:

- Lascăr Catargiu (27 November 1891 - 3 October 1895)

- Minister of the Interior:

- Lascăr Catargiu (27 November 1891 - 3 October 1895)

- Minister of Foreign Affairs:

- Alexandru Lahovary (27 November 1891 - 3 October 1895)

- Minister of Finance:

- Alexandru B. Știrbei (27 November - 18 December 1891)
- Menelas Ghermani (18 December 1891 - 3 October 1895)

- Minister of Justice:

- Dimitrie C. Sturdza-Scheianu (27 November - 18 December 1891)
- Alexandru Marghiloman (18 December 1891 - 3 October 1895)

- Minister of War:

- Gen. Iacob Lahovary (27 November 1891 - 22 February 1894)
- (interim) Lascăr Catargiu (22 February - 12 June 1894)
- Gen. Constantin Poenaru (12 June 1894 - 3 October 1895)

- Minister of Religious Affairs and Public Instruction:

- Take Ionescu (27 November 1891 - 3 October 1895)

- Minister of Public Works:

- Constantin Olănescu (27 November 1891 - 3 October 1895)

- Minister of Agriculture, Industry, Commerce, and Property:

- Gen. George Manu (27 November - 18 December 1891)
- Petre P. Carp (18 December 1891 - 3 October 1895)

Preceded by Second Florescu cabinet	Cabinet of Romania; 27 November 1891 - 3 October 1895	Succeeded by First Sturdza cabinet
