= Constantin Nacu =

Wallachian, later Romanian politician

Constantin Nacu (June 29, 1844 – February 20, 1920) was a Wallachian, later Romanian politician.

Born into a boyar family in Bucharest, he studied law at the University of Bucharest, later obtaining a law doctorate from the University of Paris. He entered the magistracy, first as a prosecutor and counsel for the Bucharest Appeals Court, and then in the private practice of law. In 1879, he was hired as a professor of civil law by his alma mater. He entered the National Liberal Party (PNL) in 1880. In 1882, party members began discussing modifications to the 1866 Constitution that would have the effect of weakening the Conservative Party's electoral strength. In the spring of 1883, an election was held for the legislature tasked with approving the modifications; it was then that Nacu won his first seat in the Assembly of Deputies. In 1884, a blaze destroyed the home of C. A. Rosetti, the printing press of his Românul newspaper and his personal library. Together with PNL members V. A. Urechia, Dimitrie Gianni and Alexandru Băicoianu, Nacu formed part of a committee that launched a public appeal to rebuild the gutted property. However, Rosetti refused their offer.

During a time of bitter rivalry between the two major parties, Nacu steadily ascended within the PNL. He won three more terms in the Assembly: in 1884, in 1888 and in 1895, when he defeated Gheorghe Manu for a Bucharest seat by 1568 votes to 235. In 1903, he was elected to the Senate for the Bucharest University seat, defeating the Junimist candidate. Between 1885 and 1888, he held several positions in the cabinet of Ion C. Brătianu. From February to December 1885, he was Justice Minister. From September 1885 to February 1888, he was Finance Minister. In the latter capacity, he oversaw the adoption of a land tax meant to discourage absentee ownership of estates. Over the course of the years 1885–1886, provisions were adopted that benefited landowners who entered the emerging capitalist economy. In 1885, he presented a law, adopted the following year, that imposed a scaled protectionist customs regime: heavy duties were charged on foreign goods produced domestically in ample quantities, while those not produced in Romania were exempt. A new commercial code, based on the Italian model, came into force in 1887.

Nacu was Interior Minister from March 1–20, 1888. During these weeks, he oversaw the intervention by the Gendarmerie and Army into a moment of political unrest. On March 13, the opposition met in Bucharest to demand that King Carol I dismiss the government; the armed forces intervened decisively in an unsuccessful attempt to keep the crowd from entering the royal palace. Two days later, a meeting to protest this action was held before parliament and again dispersed by troops. The outbreak of a peasant uprising in the areas surrounding Bucharest on March 20 impelled Carol to ask for Brătianu's resignation, which put an end to Nacu's tenure.

He died in Bucharest and was buried in Bellu cemetery.
