= Dimitrie Voinov =

Romanian Zoologist

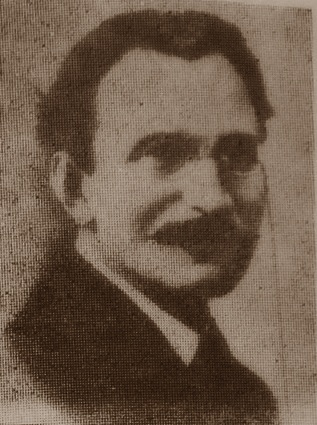
Dimitrie Voinov

Dimitrie Voinov (June 25, 1867 – July 7, 1951) was a Romanian zoologist, histologist and cytologist.

Born in Iași, he was the adopted son of politician Nicolae Voinov. He graduated from the University of Paris in 1890, going on to earn a doctorate. He extensively studied insect orders such as Coleoptera and Lepidoptera. His investigations into reproduction focused on studying the shape and structure of sperm cells. He also looked at the components of cytoplasm, including mitochondria and vacuoles.

Among his over fifty scientific works published domestically and abroad are one on the "Principles of Microscopy" (Bucharest, 1900); another on spermatogenesis in Gryllotalpa gryllotalpa (Paris, 1912) and a third on the Golgi apparatus in nerve cells (Paris, 1929). Between 1892 and 1939, he was a professor at the University of Bucharest's morphology and zoology faculty, becoming a titular member of the Romanian Academy in 1927. In 1948, the new Communist Romanian authorities allowed him to remain as an "honorary titular member". Following a road accident, he died three years later at the hospital in Găești.
