= Marshal of the Court (Romania) =

The Marshal of the Royal Court and Household of Romania (Romanian: Mareșalul Curții și al Casei Regale a României) was the highest official in the Royal Court of Romania. The Marshal was appointed by the monarch and was directly responsible for the organization and affairs of the court. The function was dissolved on 30 December 1947, when Romania became a republic.

The most famous officeholder was general Constantin Sănătescu, who, during the Royal Coup of 23 August 1944, became Prime Minister of Romania.

List of Marshals of the Royal Court of Romania

- George Filipescu (1866–1873; Grand Marshal between 1900 and 1902)
- Theodor C. Văcărescu (1873–1882)
- Victor Crețeanu (1882–1885)
- Constantin Barozzi (1885–1892)
- Matei Vlădescu (1893–1899)
- Mihail Priboianu (1900–1906)
- Leon Mavrocordat (1906–1915)
- Henri Catargi (1915–1920)
- Paul Angelescu (1920–1927)
- Nicolae Condeescu (1927–1930)
- Constantin Ilasievici (1930–1936)
- Ernest Ballif (1936–1937)
- Ernest Urdărianu (3 March–4 September 1937)
- Constantin de Flondor (1937–1940)
- Anton Mocioni (interim, 11–23 September 1940)
- Mihail Rîmniceanu (1940–1941)
- Socrate Mardare (1941–1942)
- Teodor G. Rosetti-Solescu (1 March–10 August 1942, resigned)
- Ioan Mocsony-Stârcea (1942–1944)
- Constantin Sănătescu (1 April–23 August 1944)
- Ioan Mocsony-Stârcea (23 August 1944 – 3 November 1944, resigned)
- Dimitrie Negel (1944–1947)
