= Matei Vlădescu =

Romanian politician and general (1835–1901)

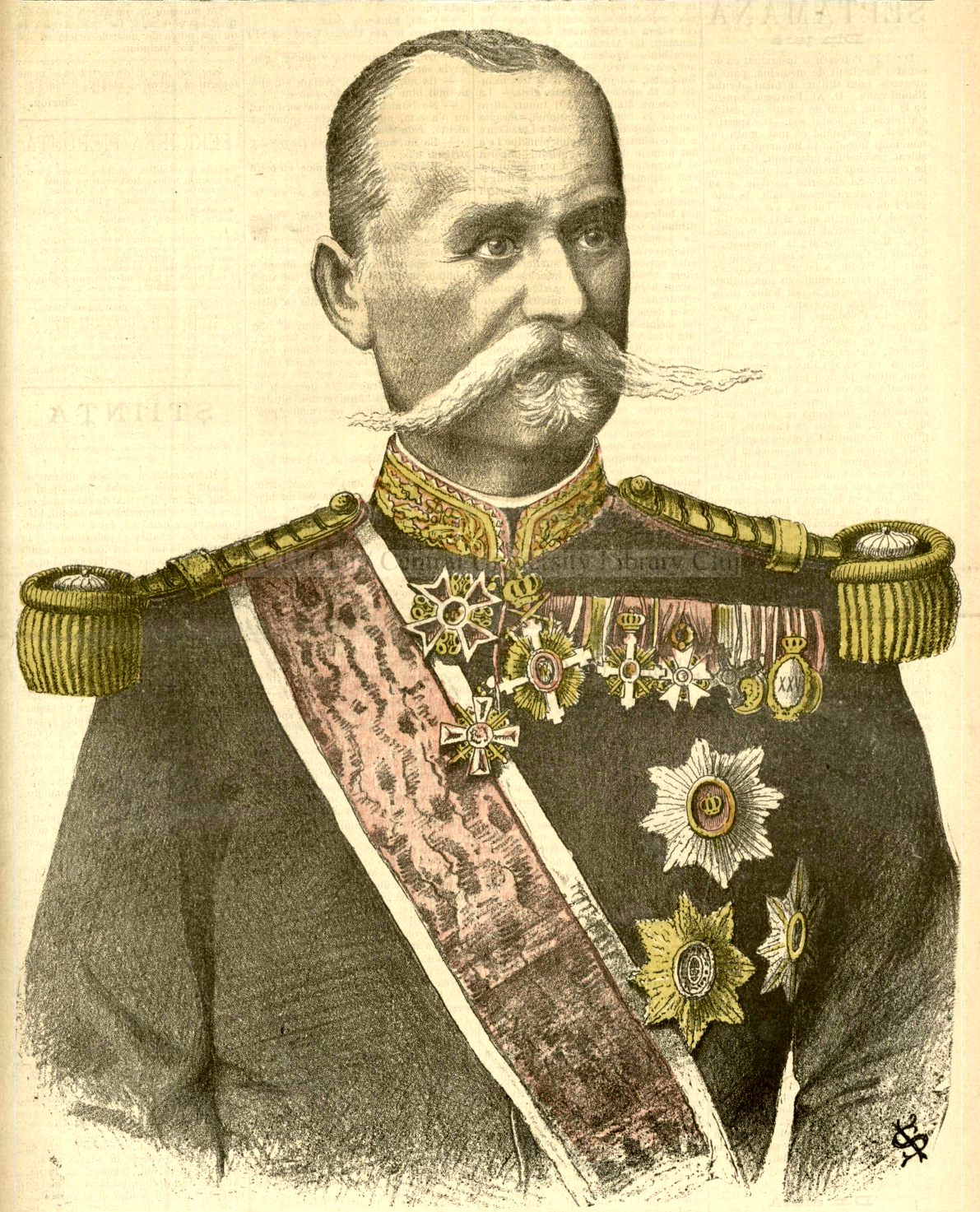
Matei Vlădescu, 1894

Matei Vlădescu (February 2, 1835 – January 23, 1901) was a Wallachian-born Romanian soldier.

Born in Târgoviște, Dâmbovița County, he entered the Bucharest Military School for Officers in 1854, becoming a second lieutenant in 1856. He rose to lieutenant (1860), captain (1863), major (1866), lieutenant-colonel (1870), colonel (1873), brigadier general (1883), and major general (1893). A participant in the Romanian War of Independence, he commanded units on the front at Pleven and Vidin.

From November 1889 to February 1891, Vlădescu served as War Minister in the cabinet of Gheorghe Manu. In 1892, he was named chief of staff to the royal household. He was awarded the Order of the Star of Romania. Vlădescu died in Bucharest in 1901. He is buried in the cemetery of Viforâta Monastery, with a funerary monument sculpted by Carol Storck.

A street in Târgoviște is named after him.
