= Gheorghe Apostoleanu =

Romanian politician and jurist

Gheorghe Apostoleanu (1832-1895) was a Romanian politician and jurist who served as the acting Minister of Justice from March 30, 1860 until April 30, 1860.
