= First Rosetti cabinet =

Romanian government cabinet

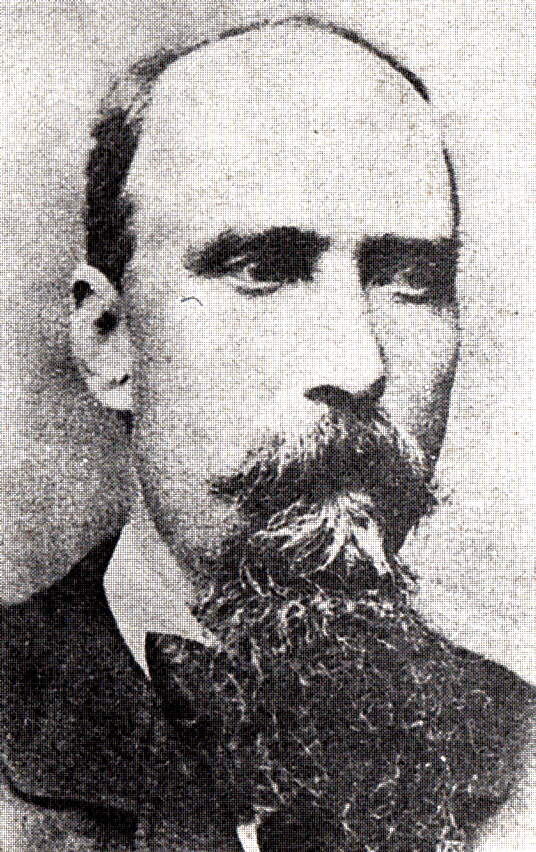
Theodor Rosetti

The first cabinet of Theodor Rosetti was the government of Romania from 22 March to 11 November 1888.

== Composition ==
The ministers of the cabinet were as follows:

- President of the Council of Ministers:

- Theodor Rosetti (22 March - 11 November 1888)

- Minister of the Interior:

- Theodor Rosetti (22 March - 11 November 1888)

- Minister of Foreign Affairs:

- Petre P. Carp (22 March - 11 November 1888)

- Minister of Finance:

- Menelas Ghermani (22 March - 11 November 1888)

- Minister of Justice:

- Alexandru Marghiloman (22 March - 11 November 1888)

- Minister of War:

- Gen. Constantin Barozzi (22 March - 11 November 1888)

- Minister of Religious Affairs and Public Instruction:

- Titu Maiorescu (22 March - 11 November 1888)

- Minister of Public Works:

- Alexandru B. Știrbei (22 March - 11 November 1888)

- Minister of Agriculture, Trade, Industry and Commerce:

- (interim) Titu Maiorescu (22 March - 4 June 1888)
- (interim) Petre P. Carp (4 June - 11 November 1888)

Preceded by Fourth Ion C. Brătianu cabinet	Cabinet of Romania; 22 March 1888 - 11 November 1888	Succeeded by Second Rosetti cabinet
