= Nicolae Blaremberg =

Romanian politician

Nicolae Moret Blaremberg (December 24, 1837–January 25, 1896) was a Romanian politician.

He was the son of Vladimir Blaremberg, a military engineers’ officer in the Imperial Russian Army, who settled in Bucharest in 1828 and was related by marriage to the Ghica family. Born in the Wallachian capital, the son was educated at the local Schevitz boarding school, and then at a preparatory school affiliated with the St. Petersburg Naval Institute. He studied at the high school in Odessa until 1853. After returning home, he entered the Justice Ministry as a clerk. He was then bureau chief, judge, court president and finally prosecutor at the Court of Cassation.

In 1863, Blaremberg took part in a double duel. Offended by Cezar Bolliac, an ally of Prince Alexandru Ion Cuza, he struck Bolliac before witnesses. His brother Constantin Blaremberg also became involved in the dispute and had to fight Bolliac's step-brother. Both men were seriously wounded; Bolliac's bullet hit Nicolae in the calf. The incident took place in Carol Davila’s botanical garden, with Cuza watching from the Cotroceni pavilion. Cuza approved of dueling and was surprised when the wounded Blaremberg showed up at the palace minutes later, tendering his resignation from prosecutorial service. He then left the country in order to take his undergraduate law degree, which he did in 1865 from the University of Provence.

After returning, he was an active participant in the 1866 overthrow of Cuza. Elected to the constituent assembly, he was part of a group of young conservatives who favored placing a foreign prince on the throne. He was elected to numerous terms in the Chamber of Deputies, and in 1889 proposed suing the government of Ion C. Brătianu.

In November 1891, he was Justice Minister under Ioan Emanoil Florescu. He was then briefly head of the civilian hospital administration. He helped launch a number of newspapers, including Revista Dunărei (1865), Desbaterile (1866), Țara and Le Pays (1870); and authored many works of jurisprudence. Blaremberg died in Bucharest.
