= George D. Vernescu =

Wallachian-born Romanian politician

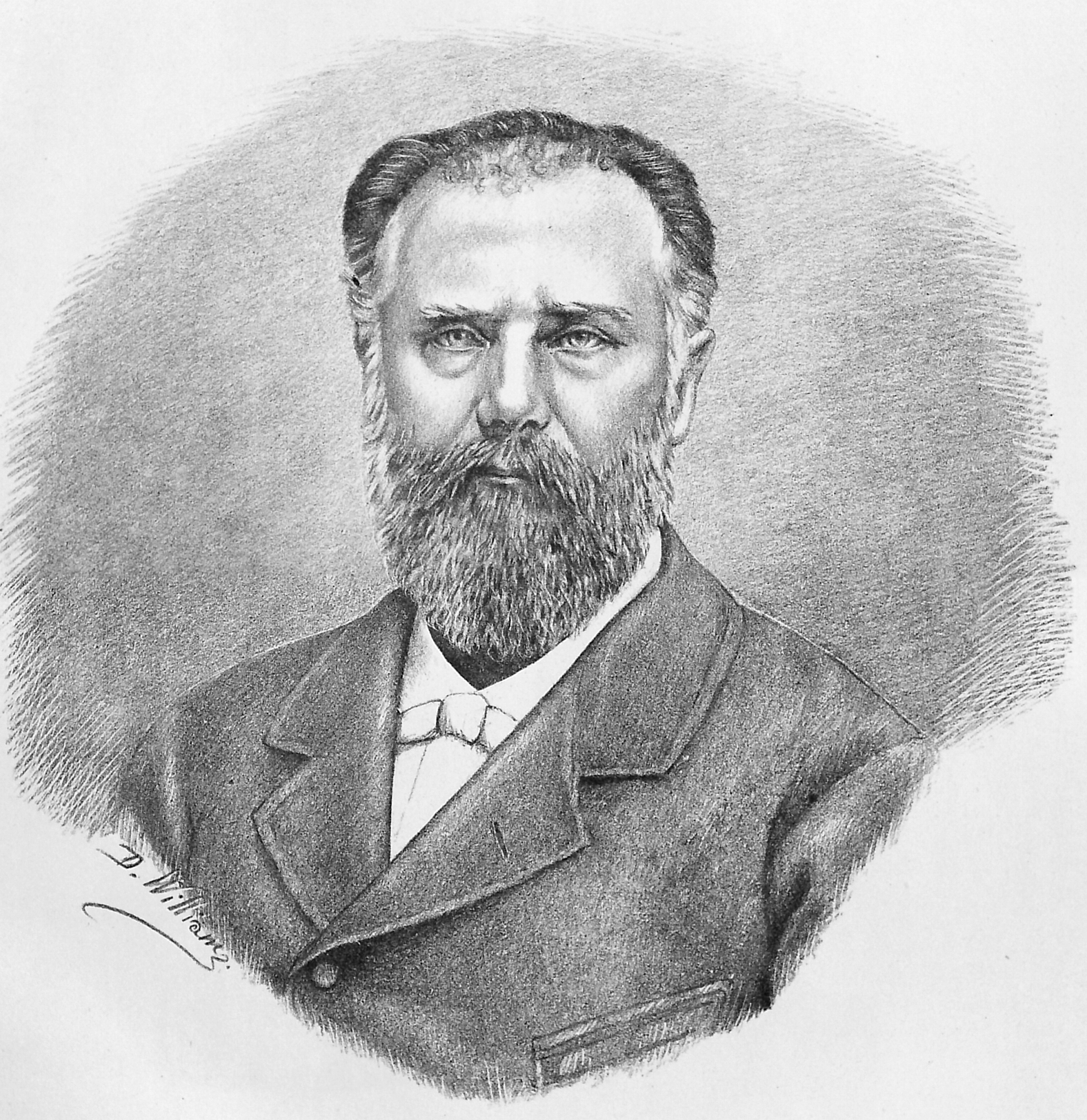
- Vernescu in an 1881 lithograph
- Born: 1 July 1829; Bucharest
- Died: 3 July 1900 (aged 71)
- Occupation: Romanian Politician

George D. Vernescu (1 July 1829 – 3 July 1900) was a Wallachian-born Romanian politician.

== Early life ==
Born in Bucharest, he attended school there until 1855, when he left for the University of Paris. Two years later, he obtained a doctorate in law from that institution.

== Early career ==
Vernescu subsequently returned home and practiced law, amassing a substantial fortune. In 1864, during the reign of Alexandru Ion Cuza, he was named to the state council. From January to June 1865, he served as Minister of Justice and Religious Affairs in the cabinet of Constantin Bosianu, and was also part of the new Senate. Elected to the constituent assembly of 1866, he was among the founders of the National Liberal Party (PNL) in 1875. In 1867, Vernescu was sent to the Assembly of Deputies; he returned to the Senate in 1876.

== Political career ==
From July 1876 to January 1877, Vernescu was Interior Minister under Ion C. Brătianu. Back in the Assembly, he served as its president from June to November 1878. In early 1880, he quit the PNL and formed a moderate group, the Sincere Liberal Party. Forming an alliance with Lascăr Catargiu's Conservatives, he formed an ad hoc organization in March 1884, the Liberal-Conservative Party, that based itself on opposing the Brătianu government. From November 1888 to March 1889, he was again Justice Minister, under Theodor Rosetti. He was then Finance Minister twice: March to November 1889, under Catargiu; and February to November 1891, under Ioan Emanoil Florescu. Subsequently, he returned to the PNL.
