= Ioan Emanoil Florescu =

Romanian army general, politician (1819-1893

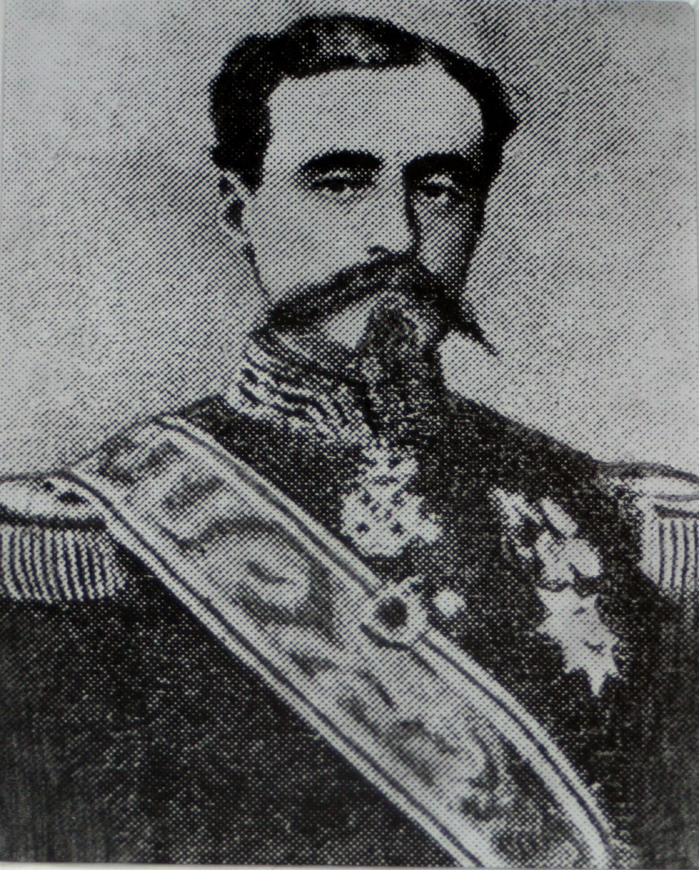

Prime Minister of Romania
- In office 4 April 1876 – 26 April 1876
- Monarch: Carol I
- Preceded by: Lascăr Catargiu
- Succeeded by: Manolache Costache Epureanu
- In office 21 February 1891 – 26 November 1891
- Monarch: Carol I
- Preceded by: Gheorghe Manu
- Succeeded by: Lascăr Catargiu

Chief of the General Staff
- In office 30 May 1860 – 30 August 1860
- Preceded by: Istratie Sămășescu
- Succeeded by: himself
- In office 21 April 1864 – 1 May 1866
- Preceded by: himself
- Succeeded by: Gheorghe Slăniceanu

Personal details
- Born: 7 August 1819 Râmnicu Vâlcea, Wallachia
- Died: 10 May 1893 (aged 73) Paris, France
- Party: Conservative Party
- Spouses: Ecaterina Bibescu; Alina Știrbey
- Relatives: Alexandru Emanoil Florescu (brother)
- Education: École spéciale militaire de Saint-Cyr

Ioan Emanoil Florescu (Romanian pronunciation: [iˈo̯aŋ emanoˈil floˈresku]; 7 August 1819, Râmnicu Vâlcea, Wallachia – 10 May 1893, Paris, France) was a Romanian army general who served as Prime Minister of Romania for a short time in a provisional government in 1876 (4 April – 26 April) and then in 1891 (21 February – 26 November). He also served as Chief of the General Staff in 1860 (30 May – 30 August) and then from 21 April 1864 to 1 May 1866.

Florescu is credited with carrying through the unification of the two armed forces of Wallachia and Moldavia following the unification of these two principalities and a thorough organization and modernization of the nascent Romanian army.

His cousin was Bonifaciu Florescu.
