= Theodor Rosetti =

Romanian writer, journalist and politician

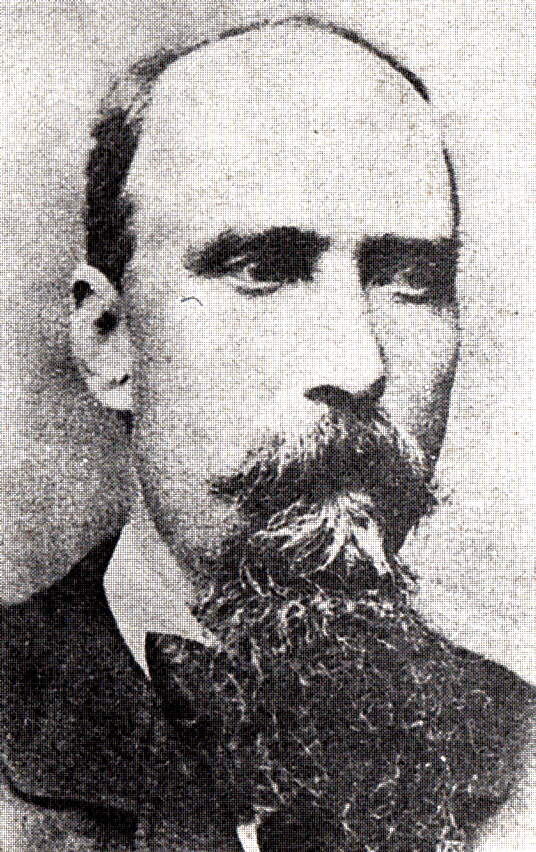
Theodor Rosetti

Prince Theodor Rosetti (Romanian pronunciation: [teˈodor roˈseti]; 5 May 1837 – 17 July 1923) was a Romanian writer, journalist and politician who served as Prime Minister of Romania between 23 March 1888 and 22 March 1889, with two cabinets formed. Over his life, he also served several other roles within the judicial and government.

He is an aristocrat and member of the House of Rosetti. He was born in Iași or Solești, Moldavia. He was the brother-in-law of Prince Alexandru Ioan Cuza, the former ruler of Romania and was considered to be on the conservative pro-monarchy side of the government. Rosetti was one of the most important members of the Junimea literary society and was elected honorary member of the Romanian Academy in 1891. He died in Bucharest at age 86 and was buried in the city's Bellu Cemetery. Streets in Bârlad and Iași are named after him.

== See also ==
- First Rosetti cabinet
- Second Rosetti cabinet
