= Gheorghe Manu =

Romanian Army general, artillery inspector and statesman

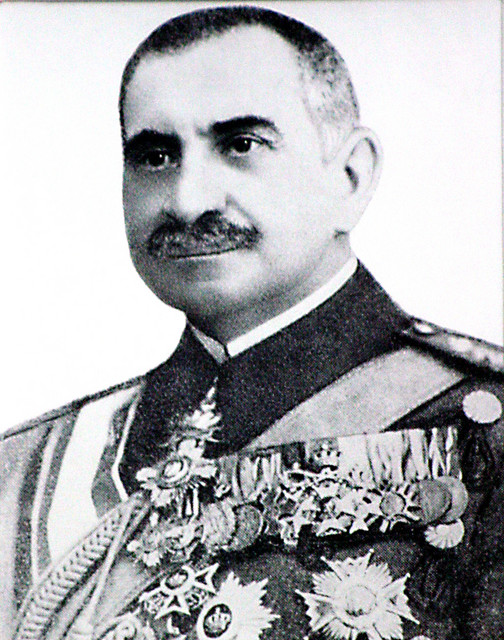

Prime Minister of Romania
- In office 5 November 1889 – 15 February 1891
- Monarch: Carol I
- Preceded by: Lascăr Catargiu
- Succeeded by: Ioan Emanoil Florescu

Minister of War of Kingdom of Romania
- In office 14 July 1869 – 17 December 1870
- Prime Minister: Dimitrie Ghica; Alexandru G. Golescu; Manolache Costache Epureanu
- Preceded by: Ioan Alexandru Duca
- Succeeded by: Eustațiu Pencovici

Minister of War of Kingdom of Romania
- In office 12 November 1888 – 4 November 1889
- Prime Minister: Theodor Rosetti; Lascăr Catargiu
- Preceded by: Constantin Barozzi
- Succeeded by: Matei Vlădescu

Minister of War of Kingdom of Romania
- In office 22 December 1904 – 11 March 1906
- Prime Minister: Dimitrie Sturdza; Gheorghe Grigore Cantacuzino
- Preceded by: Dimitrie Sturdza
- Succeeded by: Alexandru Averescu

Mayor of Bucharest
- In office October 1873 – April 1877
- Preceded by: N. C. Brăiloiu
- Succeeded by: C. A. Rosetti

Romanian Minister of the Interior
- In office 5 November 1889 – 15 February 1891
- Prime Minister: Himself
- Preceded by: Lascăr Catargiu
- Succeeded by: Lascăr Catargiu

President of the Assembly of Deputies
- In office 26 February 1892 – 24 October 1895
- Monarch: Carol I
- Preceded by: Gheorghe Rosnovanu
- Succeeded by: Petre S. Aurelian

Romanian Minister of the Interior
- In office 9 January 1900 – 7 July 1900
- Prime Minister: Gheorghe Grigore Cantacuzino
- Preceded by: Gheorghe Grigore Cantacuzino
- Succeeded by: Constantin Olănescu

Personal details
- Born: July 26, 1833 Bucharest, Wallachia
- Died: May 16, 1911 (aged 77) Bucharest, Kingdom of Romania
- Party: Conservative Party (PC)
- Awards: Military Virtue Medal

Military service
- Branch/service: Romanian Land Forces
- Rank: divisional general
- Battles/wars: Romanian War of Independence

Gheorghe Manu (Romanian pronunciation: [ˈɡe̯orɡe ˈmanu]; 26 July 1833, Bucharest, Wallachia – 16 May 1911, Bucharest, Kingdom of Romania) was a Romanian Army general, artillery inspector and statesman. He served as Prime Minister (1889–1891), Minister of War, Minister of the Interior, President of the Assembly of Deputies, and Mayor of Bucharest.

== Biography ==
After he finished his high school studies in Romania, he went to Prussia in 1847 to study in the German military academies and in 1853, with the approval of the Romanian government, he joined the Prussian Army as a sub-lieutenant.

Returning to his country in 1858, he joined the Romanian Army, being charged with the organization of the Romanian artillery. He was in charge of this task until he resigned in 1884. From 1869 to 1870, Manu, a colonel, was part of the cabinets of Dimitrie Ghica and Manolache Costache Epureanu, heading the War Ministry. In 1874, he was chosen Mayor of Bucharest, keeping this function until 1877. During his tenure, he initiated the creation of a modern water supply network for the city; the works were interrupted between 1877 and 1878, but by 1879 over ten kilometers of pipes were installed.

As the Romanian War of Independence began in 1877, General Manu served the commander of the 4th division, in charge of defending Romania in Oltenița, Corabia, Bechet, Islaz and Turnu Măgurele, but following the offensive, his division took part in the campaign on the plains of Bulgaria, in Pleven and Vidin. He was the first Romanian decorated with the Military Virtue Medal, in May 1877.

After the war, he served as an artillery inspector until 1888, when he resigned. He was Minister of War in the governments of Theodor Rosetti and Lascăr Catargiu, serving from 12 November 1888 to 5 November 1889 (Old Style). He was also a Prime Minister between 5 November 1889 and 15 February 1891. On 27 November 1891, in the Lascăr Catargiu cabinet, he became the Minister of State Property, but quit to become the President of the Chamber of Deputies, a post he held until 1895, when he retired.

== Publications ==
- Gheorghe Manu; B. Mangâru (1906). Discursurile, 1871–1906. Adunate și colecționate de B. Mangâru. Pentru a servi la cunoașterea istoriei moderne a României (in Romanian). Bucharest: F. Göbl. OCLC 890948983.

== Gallery of caricatures ==
=== Drawn by Nicolae Petrescu-Găină ===
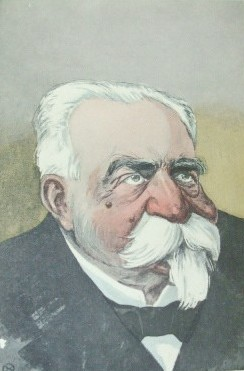
Gheorghe Manu

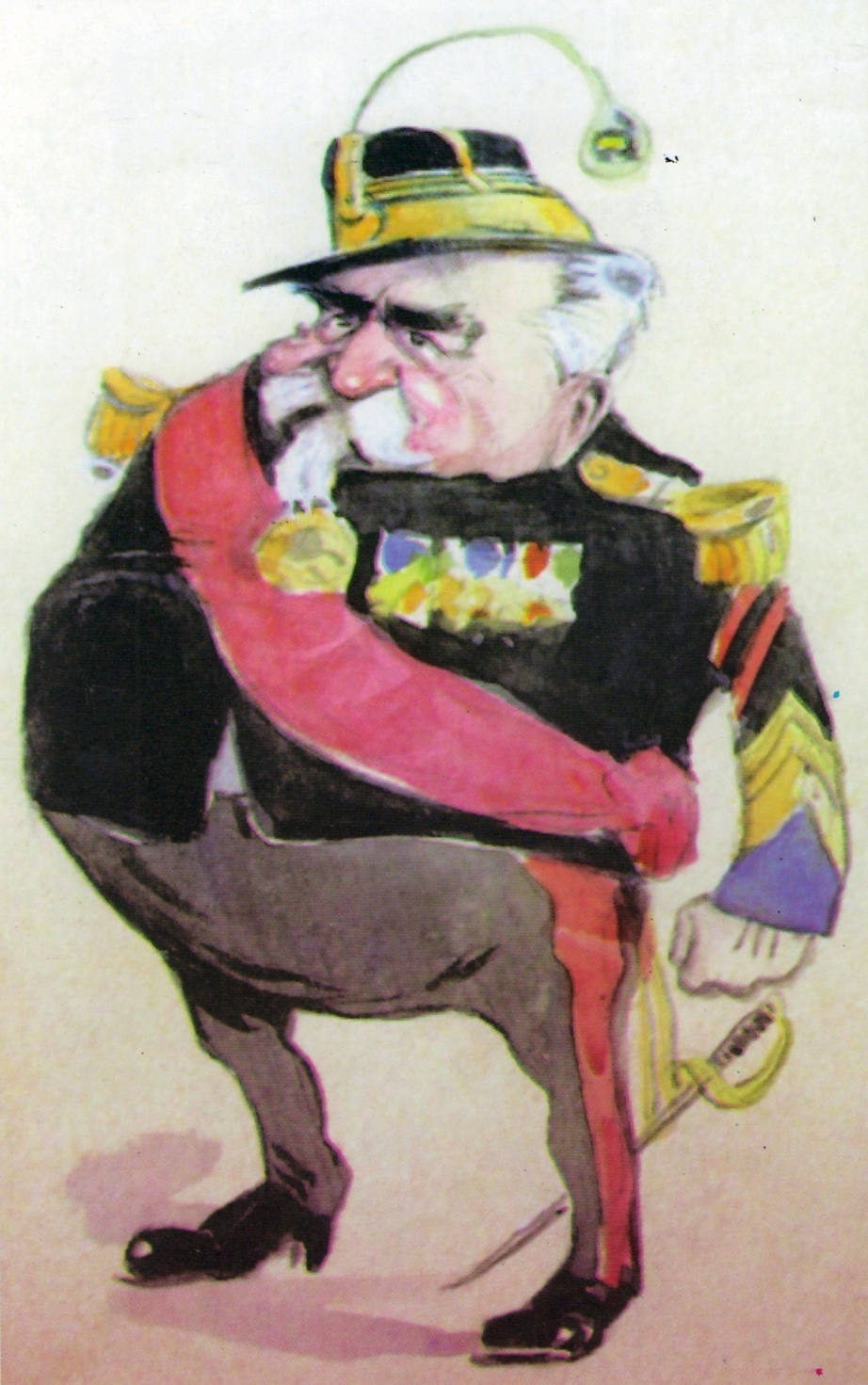
Minister of Interior

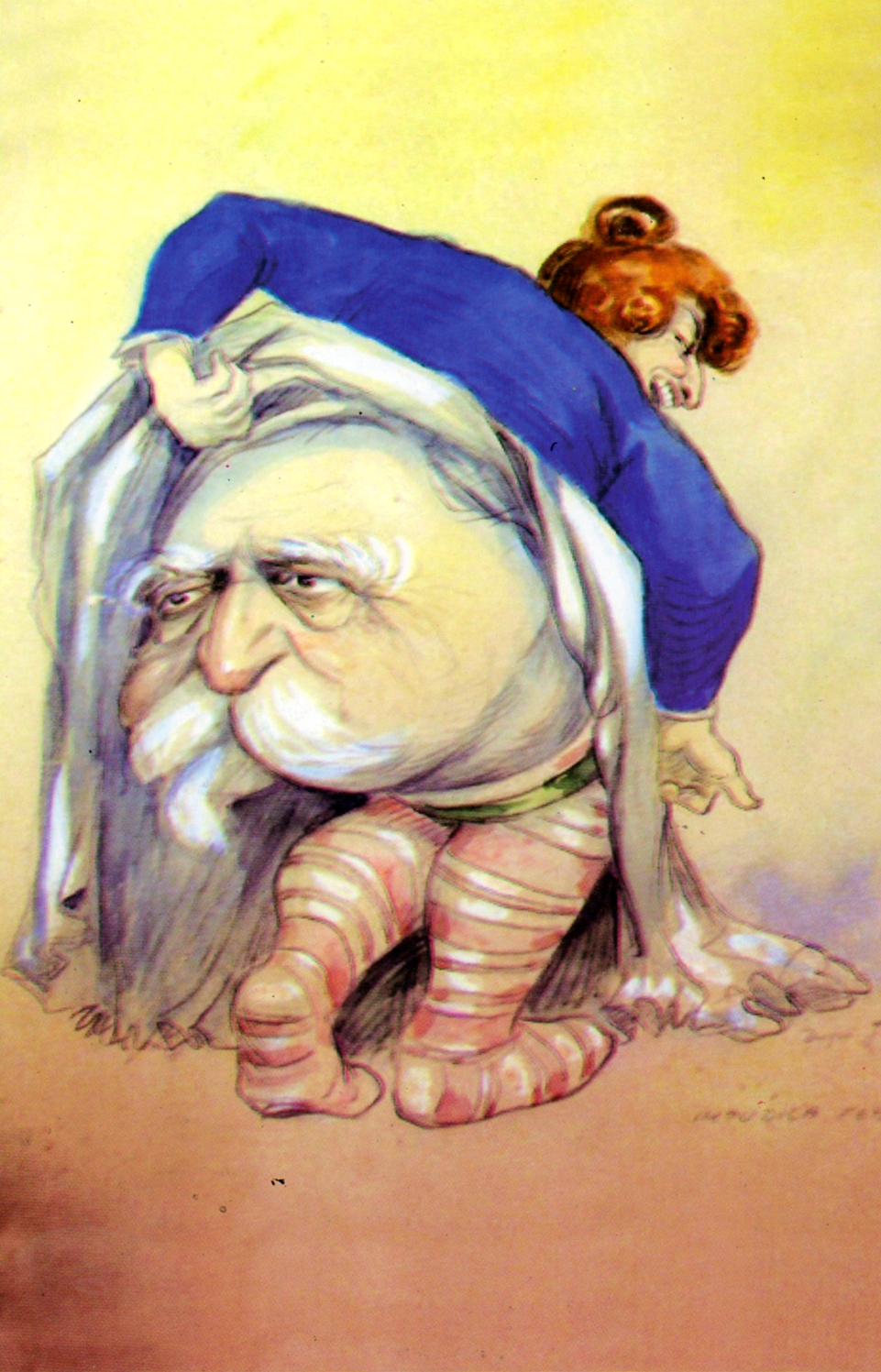
Prefect of police

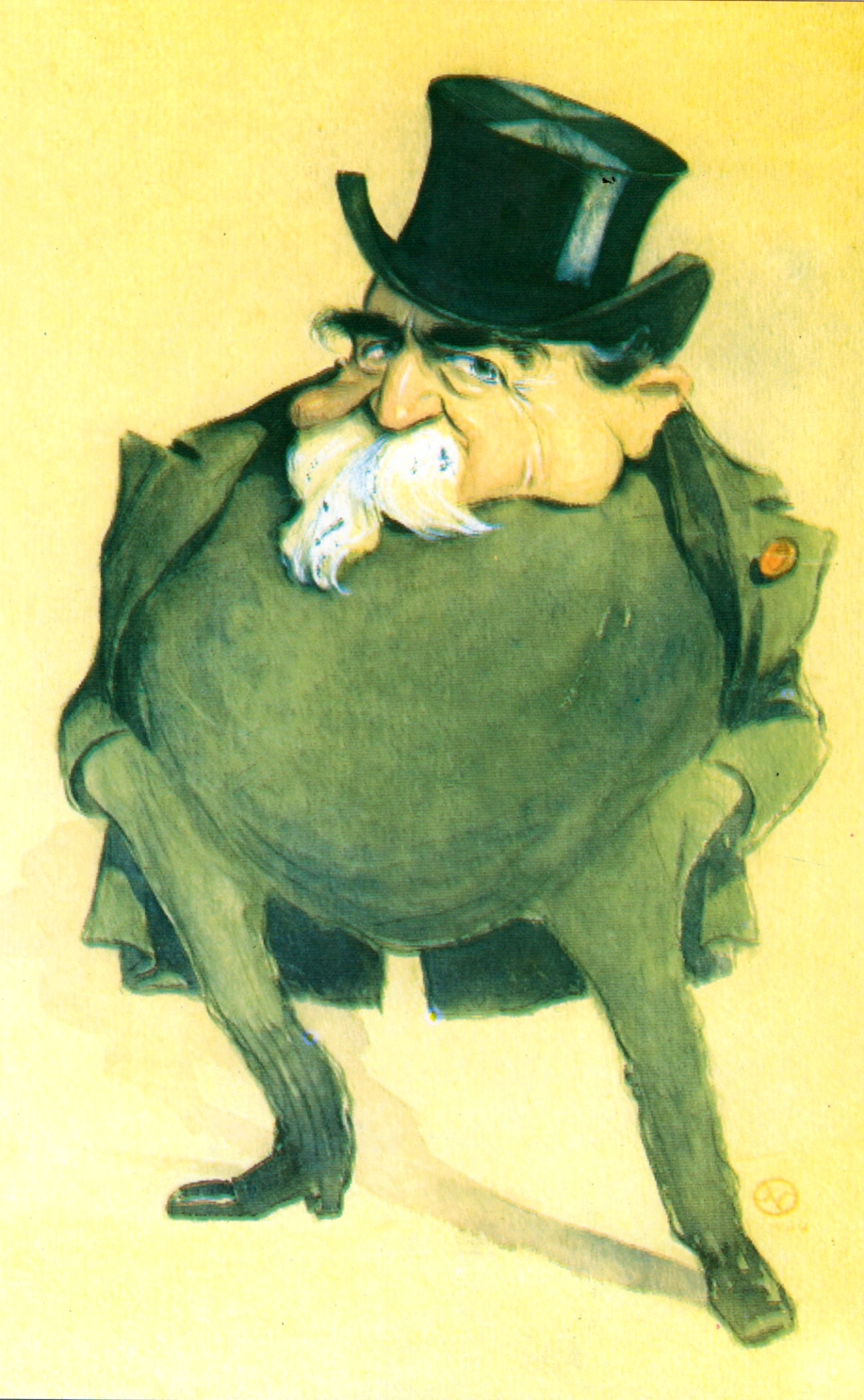
Civilian

=== From Adevărul, 1899 ===
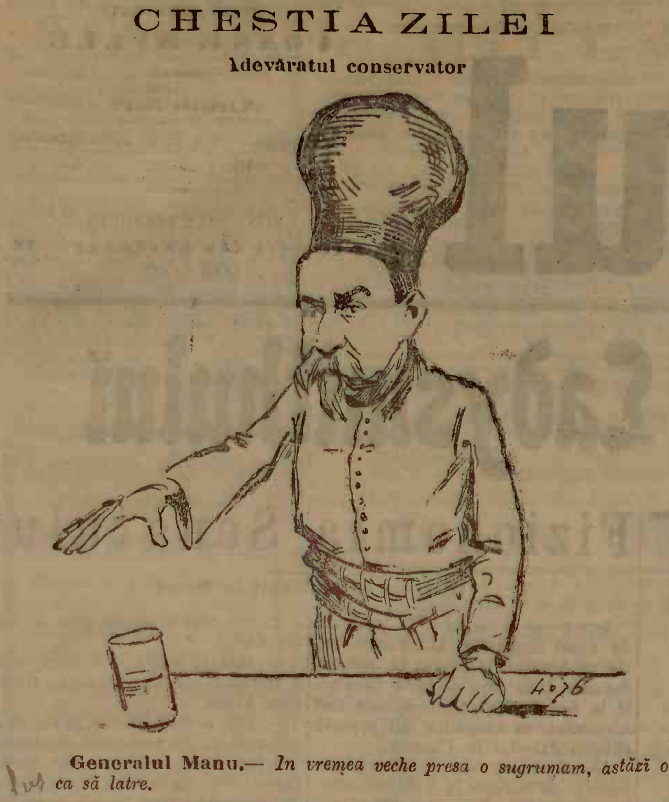
