= Lascăr Catargiu =

Romanian conservative statesman (1823–1899)

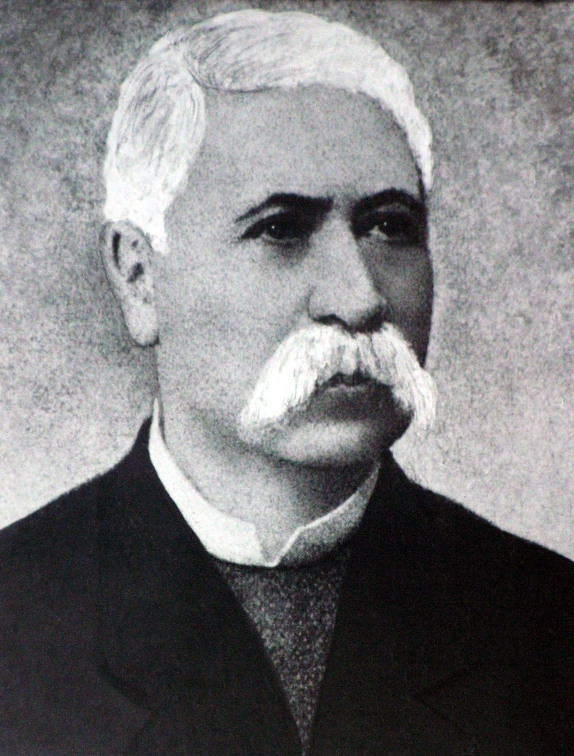

6th Prime Minister of Romania
- In office 27 November 1891 – 3 October 1895
- Monarch: Carol I
- Preceded by: Ioan Emanoil Florescu
- Succeeded by: Dimitrie Sturdza
- In office 29 March 1889 – 3 November 1889
- Monarch: Carol I
- Preceded by: Theodor Rosetti
- Succeeded by: Gheorghe Manu
- In office 11 March 1871 – 30 March 1876
- Monarch: Carol I
- Preceded by: Ion Ghica
- Succeeded by: Ioan Emanoil Florescu
- In office 11 May 1866 – 13 July 1866
- Monarch: Carol I
- Preceded by: Ion Ghica
- Succeeded by: Ion Ghica

5th President of the Chamber of Deputies of Romania
- In office 7 December 1866 – 1 November 1867
- Monarch: Carol I
- Preceded by: Manolache Costache Epureanu
- Succeeded by: Anastasie Fătu
- In office 10 November 1888 – 14 January 1889
- Monarch: Carol I
- Preceded by: Dimitrie Lecca
- Succeeded by: Constantin Grădișteanu

Personal details
- Born: 1 November 1823; Iași, Moldavia
- Died: 30 March 1899 (aged 75); Bucharest, Kingdom of Romania
- Resting place: Bellu Cemetery, Bucharest
- Political party: Conservative Party
- Spouse: Eufrosina Ventura
- Parent: Constantin Catargiu (father)
- Occupation: Statesman; politician

Lascăr Catargiu (Romanian: [ˈlaskər katarˈd͡ʒi.u], surname also spelled Catargi; 1 November 1823 – 30 March 1899) was a Romanian conservative statesman born in Moldavia. He belonged to an ancient Wallachian family, one of whose members had been banished in the 17th century by Prince Matei Basarab, and had settled in Moldavia.

== Biography ==
He was born in Iași, the son of Constantin Catargiu, the scion of an old boyar family. According to some historians, he had Gagauz ancestry. From 1843 to 1844, he served as deputy ispravnic in Huși and then as pârcălab in Neamț County. Lascăr Catargiu rose to the office of prefect of police in Iași under the rule of the Moldavian Prince Grigore Ghica (1849–1856). In 1857 he became a member of the ad hoc Divan of Moldavia, a commission elected in accordance with the Treaty of Paris (1856) to vote on the proposed union of Moldavia and Wallachia (the Danubian Principalities). His strongly conservative views, especially on land reform, induced the Conservatives to support him as a candidate for the Romanian throne in 1859.

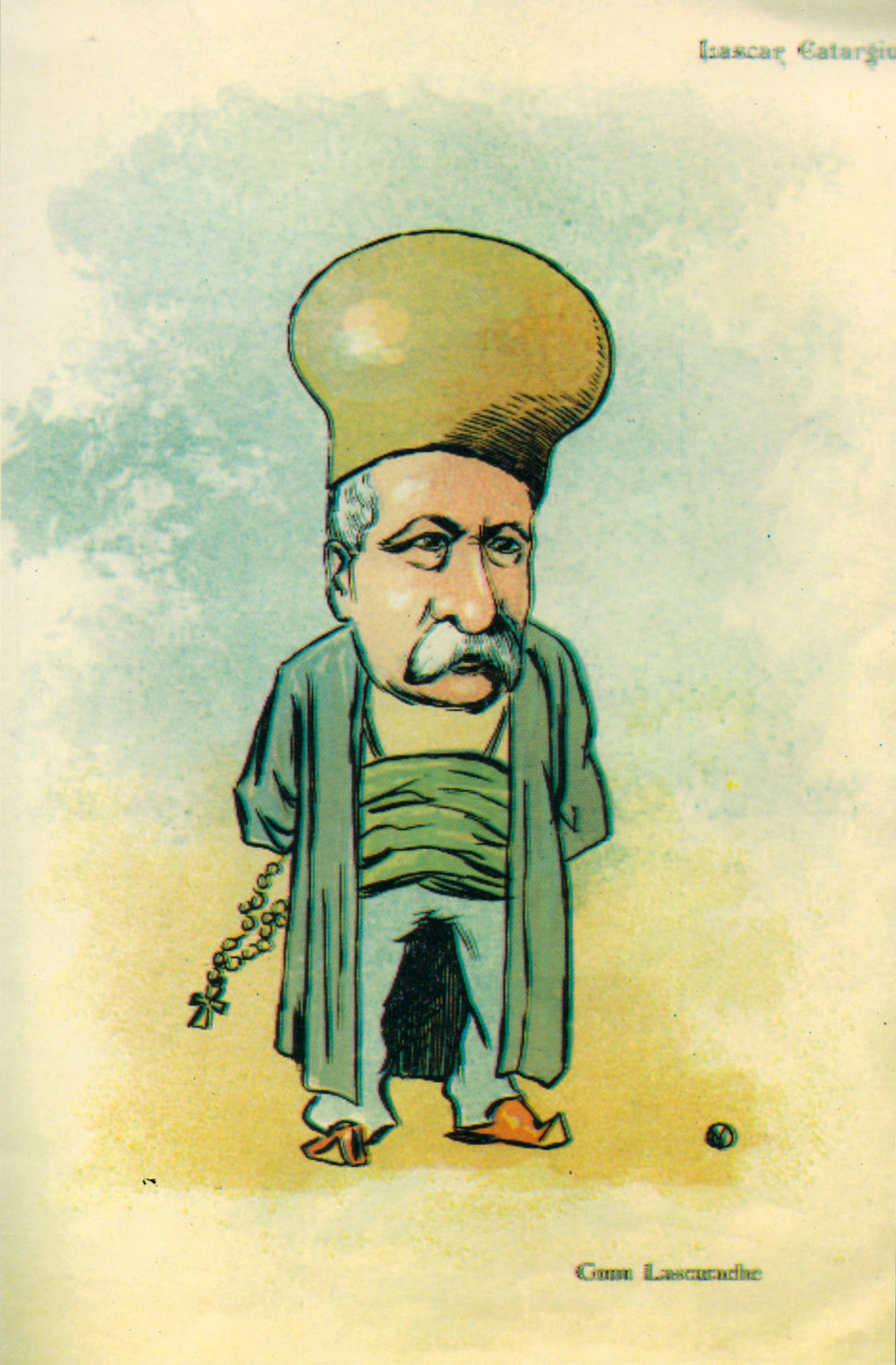
Lascăr Catargiu - caricature by Nicolae Petrescu-Găină

During the reign of Domnitor Alexandru Ioan Cuza (1859–1866), Catargiu was one of the Opposition leaders, and received much assistance from his kinsman, Barbu Catargiu (b. 1807), a noted journalist and politician, who was assassinated in Bucharest on 20 June 1862. Lascăr Catargiu consequently took part in the so-called monstrous coalition that toppled Cuza, and, on the accession of Domnitor Carol I in May 1866, became President of the Council of Ministers but, finding himself unable to cooperate with his Liberal colleagues, Ion Brătianu and C. A. Rosetti, he resigned in July.

After eight more ministerial changes, culminating in the anti-dynastic agitation of 1870–1871 (provoked by the Liberals in the context of the Franco-Prussian War; see also Republic of Ploiești), Catargiu formed, for the first time in Romanian history, a stable Conservative cabinet, which lasted until 1876. His policy, which averted political violence and revived the popularity of the crown, was regarded as unpatriotic and reactionary by the Liberals, who resumed office in 1876; and a proposal to impeach the whole Catargiu cabinet was only withdrawn in 1878.

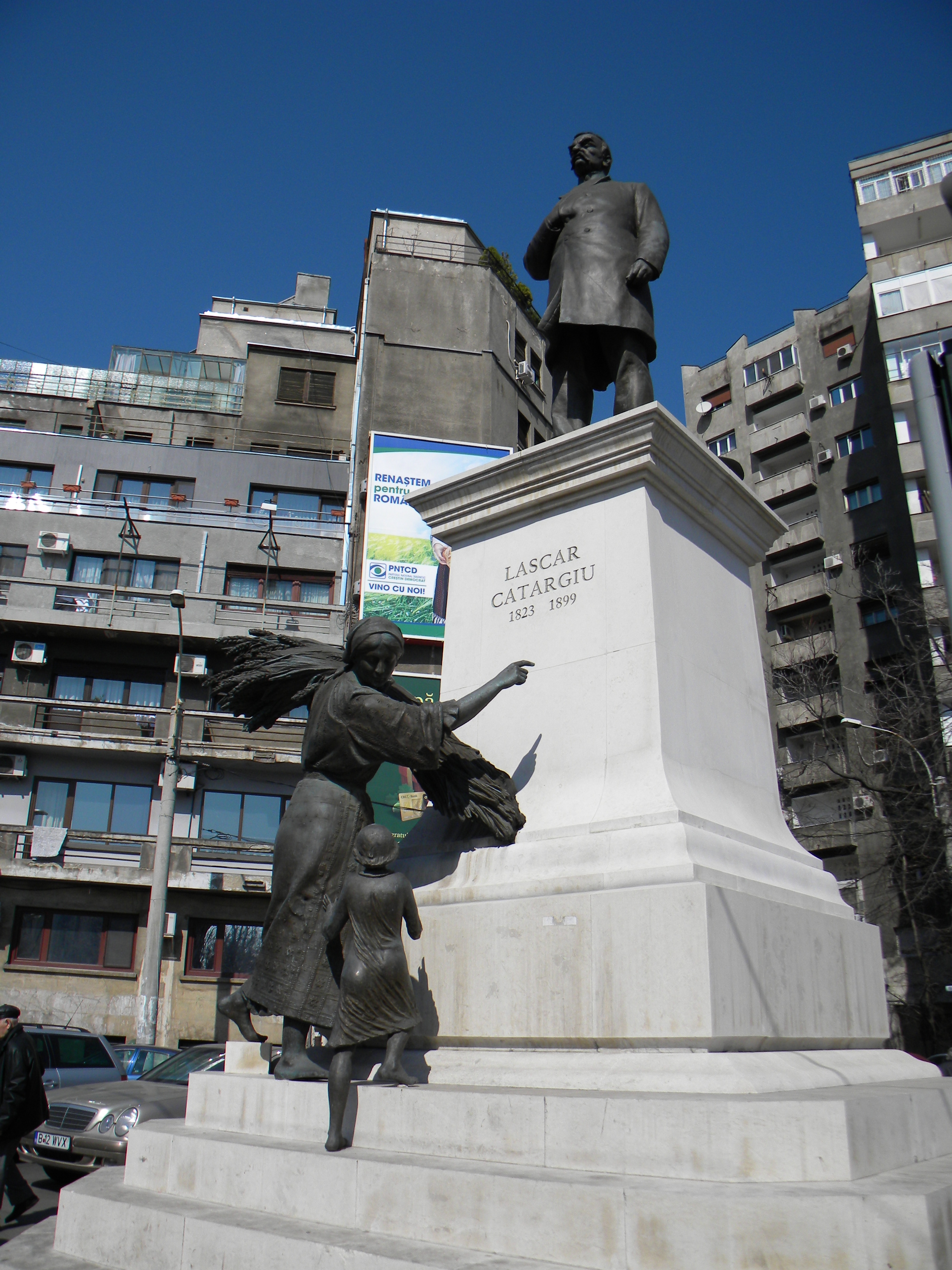
Statue of Catargiu on Lascăr Catargiu Boulevard, Bucharest

Catargiu remained in opposition until 1889, when he formed another cabinet, taking the portfolio of the Interior; but this administration fell after seven months. In the Ioan Emanoil Florescu cabinet of March 1891 he occupied the same position, and in December he again became president of the Council, retaining office until 1895. During this period he was responsible for several important reforms, chiefly financial and commercial. He died in Bucharest and was buried in the city's Bellu Cemetery.

The Lascăr Catargiu Boulevard—one of the main roads in central Bucharest—connects Piața Romană to Piața Victoriei. In the middle of the boulevard lies a statue of Catargiu, built by sculptor Antonin Mercié in 1907.
