= 1868 Romanian Senate election =

- July 1868

All c. 60 eligible seats in the Senate
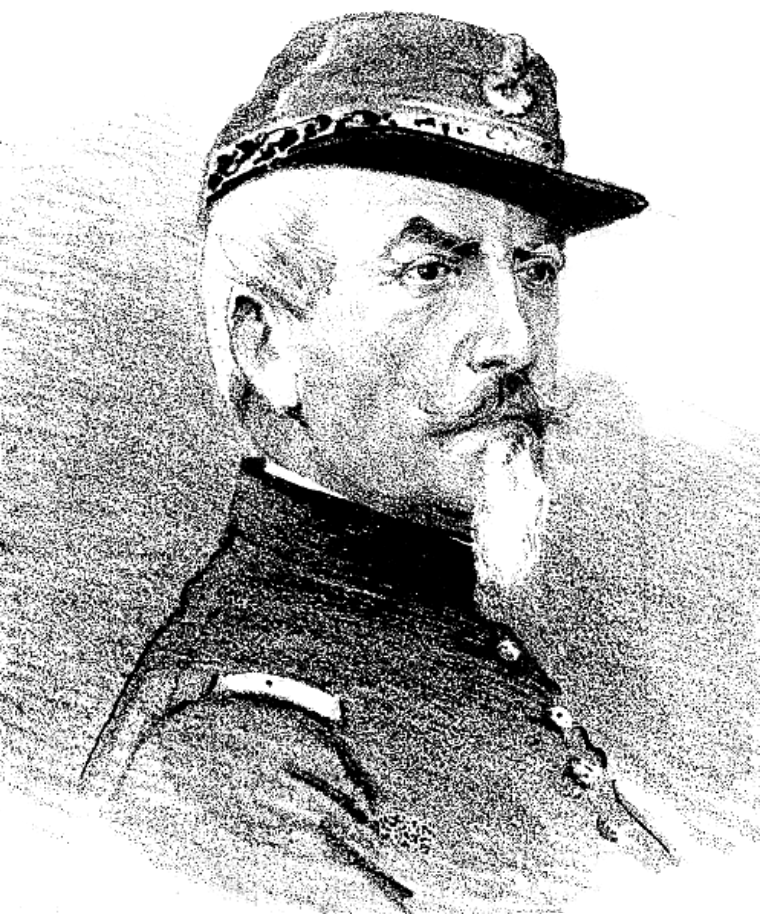

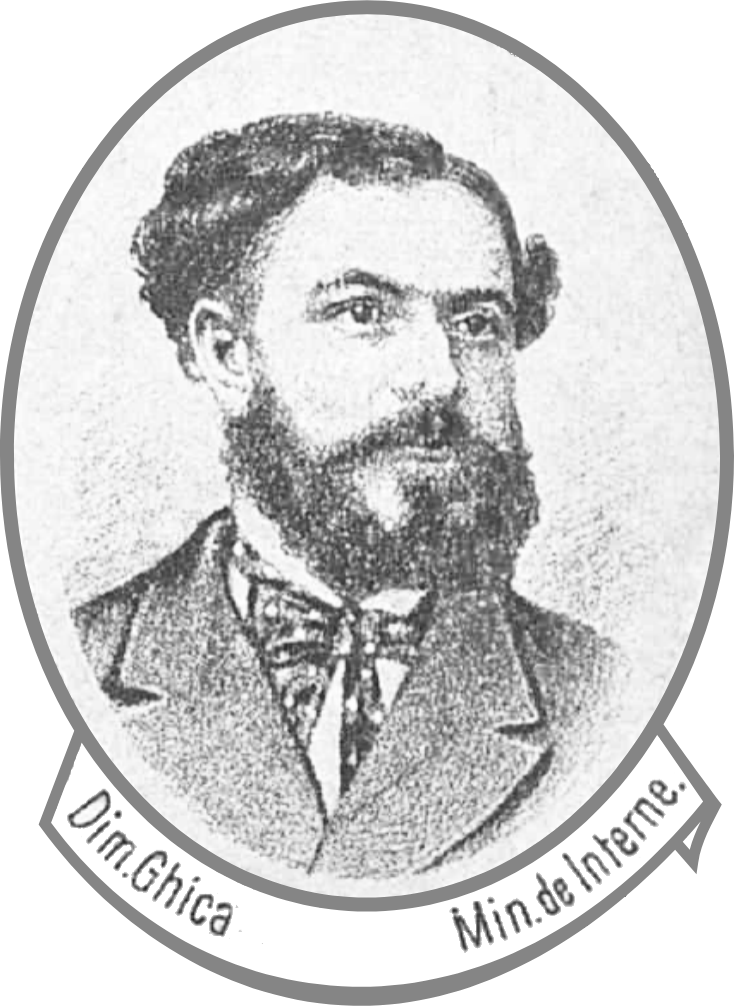

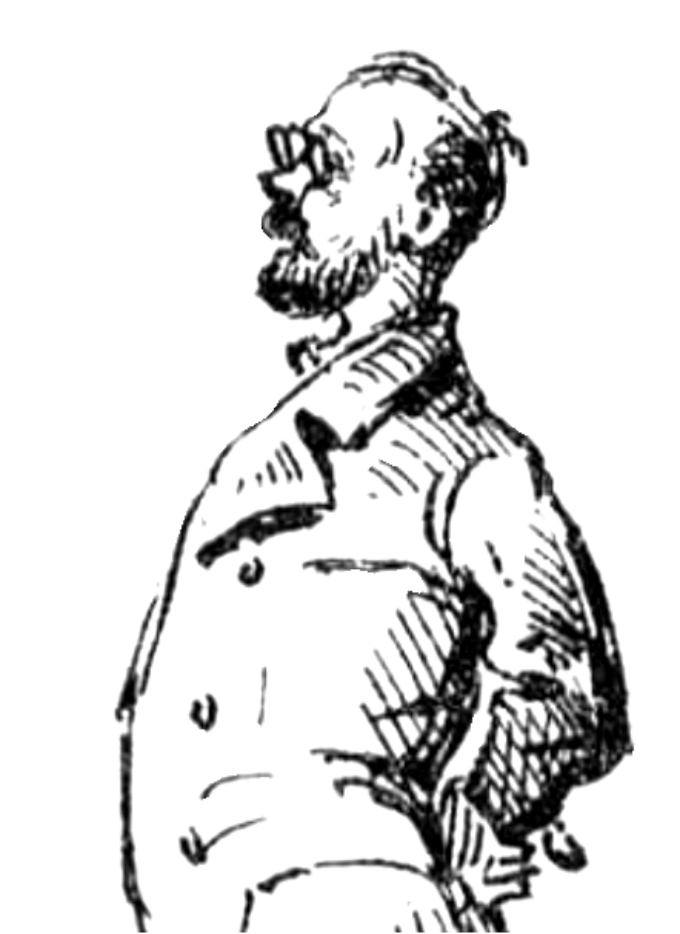
	First party	Second party	Third party
Leader	Nicolae Golescu	Dimitrie Ghica	Nicolae Ionescu
Party	"Red" liberals	"Whites"	Free and Independent Faction
Leader since	1868	1866	1866
Leader's seat	Fălciu	N/A	Iași
Seat change	▲	▼	▼

Elections for the Senate were held in Romania on July 7–11 (New Style: July 19–23), 1868. They were called by Prime Minister Nicolae Golescu to strengthen his majority in the 1867 legislature, and, although party affiliations remain unclear, ensured a victory for Golescu and the various liberal-radical factions (or "Reds"). The snap election followed standoffs between Senate and the Assembly of Deputies, in particular one over the issue of constructing a Romanian railways system. It also came after major disagreements between "Red" politicians and the Free and Independent Faction, which had previously backed Golescu, before moving closer to the center.

Conservative voters (the "Whites") were reportedly taken by surprise, and the election, like many others of the period, was marred by malpractices favoring government. The resulting Senate was overall "reddish" or "pink", combining a majority of "Reds" and their occasional allies. Despite general defeat, various leading figures of the opposition, including Nicolae Ionescu, Gheorghe Costaforu, and Ioan Manu, managed reelection. Campaigning was prolonged by some by-elections for the Assembly, with Ilfov and several other counties still voting on July 13–15 (July 25–27).

The period witnessed new developments in the long crisis over the issue of Jewish emancipation, with its regular outbursts of antisemitic violence at Bacău and elsewhere. It also brought the early stages of the Strousberg Affair, and diplomatic incidents related to Bulgarian revolutionary activity on Romanian soil, including Hadzhi Dimitar's conspiracy at Pietroșani. Despite helping to consolidate executive power, the election, which had remarkably low voter presence, could not tackle these obstacles. Government was also weakened by diplomatic intrigues—the Ottoman Empire, Romania's suzerain power, resented its radicalism, as did the French Empire, Austria-Hungary, and eventually Prussia. Some four months after his victory, Golescu resigned to be replaced by the "White" Dimitrie Ghica, who overturned the liberal majority in the elections of March 1869.

== Context ==
=== Early clashes ===
The 1866 Constitution had consolidated the "United Principalities" into a centralized monarchy, ruled by Domnitor Carol of Hohenzollern. Nevertheless, political life remained troubled, with government instability and passionate disputes about the proposed emancipation of Romanian Jews. With support from the Domnitor, "Red" liberal factions, holding a slim plurality in the Assembly, had fused into a "Concordia Agreement". Also backed by the antisemitic Free and Independent Faction, it came to power with Constantin A. Kretzulescu, but created an international scandal by endorsing the eviction of Jewish "vagabonds" from the countryside. This affair was engineered by the Interior Minister, Ion Brătianu. Although in and out of office during that period, he was, by various accounts, a behind-the-scenes leader of the executive.

This "Red" consolidation was viewed with displeasure in the French Empire, where Brătianu was remembered chiefly for his youthful involvement with a political conspirator and regicide, Giuseppe Marco Fieschi. Early 1868 came with a noticeable strain in Franco–Romanian relations, with French officials suspecting that Carol and Brătianu were seeking to create a secret alliance with Prussia and the Russian Empire. This was partly validated when Carol sent Ioan C. Cantacuzino and Melchisedec Ștefănescu to Saint Petersburg, where they negotiated an end to the privileged status of Russian citizens on Romanian soil—and, in effect, the recognition of Romania as self-governed. Delaporte, the French consul in Iași, alleged in January 1868 that Brătianu exercised a hypnotic power on the Domnitor, but also that the "Reds" and the Romanian Freemasonry had an ultimate plan to topple the monarchy altogether. In reality, the monarch was pursuing his own foreign policy, which implied ending Romania's subservience toward the Ottoman Empire and establishing a Balkan Federation of "Christian states".

A reshuffled Concordia government, headed by Ștefan Golescu, organized general elections in late 1867. These were widely believed to have been manipulated by government through intimidation and fraud, and as such a pattern for the following elections. Although the "Reds" had overall control of Parliament, splits and disputes continued to present obstacles: in the Assembly, the Factionalists proposed a radically antisemitic bill that was only defeated with support from moderate "Reds"; at the time, the Prime Minister was under foreign pressure to limit antisemitic excesses. Having supported the expulsion of Jews from the countryside, and still embracing generic economic antisemitism, Brătianu backed down to some extent, noting that the Factionalists were being excessive, "inhumane and un-Romanian". However, he also continued tolerate the expulsions of Jews by his subordinate Gheorghe Lecca, with antisemitic incidents concentrated in places such as Bârlad and Bacău.

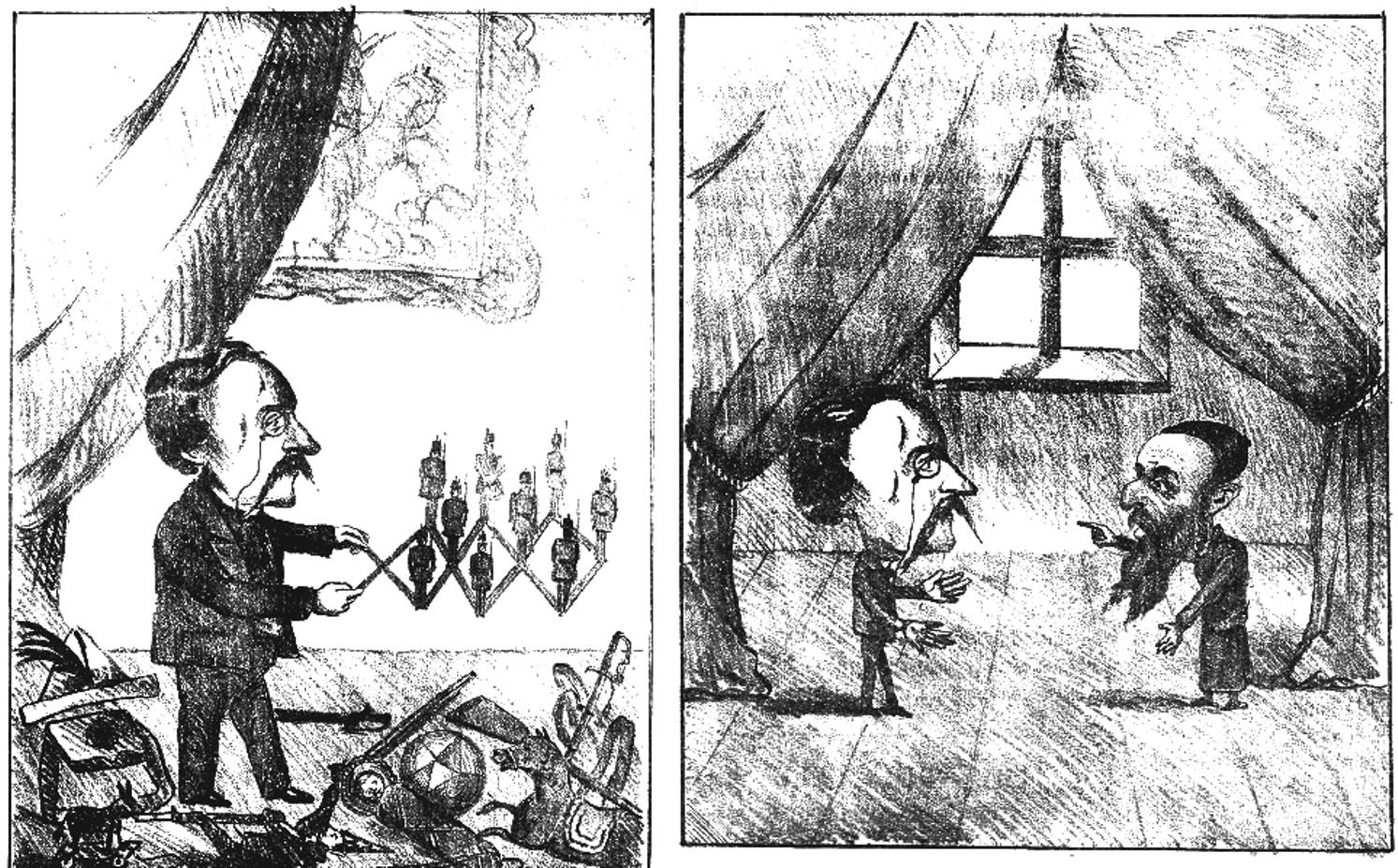
April 1868 cartoons in the "Red" gazette Ghimpele, mocking Petre P. Carp's investigation of the Bulgarian Revolutionary Central Committee as a rummaging through toys, and showing him being subservient to a stereotypical Jewish man, his sponsor (or creditor)

By then, the Concordia alliance was under strain, with the Factionalists, who were centered in Western Moldavia, pressuring government to inaugurate a working Court of Cassation at Focșani. Visiting Bacău and Iași to canvass among the local liberals and thus create a moderate alliance, Brătianu was met by a riotous mob of Factionalist voters. The continued discrimination against Jews also became a rally point for some conservatives (or "Whites"), including Vaslui deputy Petre P. Carp, who had a number of public disputes with the Interior Minister. Despite their differences on the issue of emancipation, it became apparent that the "Whites", mostly aristocratic "boyars", were reaching out to the middle-class Factionalists, united in their rejection of "Red" liberalism. Factionalist deputies (including Alexandru Gheorghiu, Alecu D. Holban, Ioan Negură, and Ianache Lecca) attacked government at the same time as Carp, citing concerns about limitations on press freedom. The left-leaning humorist Nicor satirized this alliance by claiming that the Factionalist senator Nicolae Ionescu was trying to pass for a "boyar" or "young lord", "avoiding democracy like the plague."

=== General Golescu's ascendancy ===
Following the international backlash after particularly violent antisemitic activities in Bacău, the Prime Minister resigned, officially because of illness. Leadership of the cabinet was assigned to General Nicolae Golescu, his brother, who was even more of a moderate. When General Golescu apologized to European governments for the intolerance cultivated in earlier years, the Faction began voting with the opposition, and the majority was again undermined; this weakening continued as centrist "Reds" began demanding that Brătianu and his radicals be shuffled out of Golescu's cabinet. Nevertheless, moderation greatly improved Romania's standing in Europe, and, although still an Ottoman vassal, she came to be treated as a nation-state by Prussia, Russia, and Austria-Hungary. After having been highly critical of Romania's stance on Jewish migration, France was also coming to show signs of leniency: in March 1868 Delaporte contended that Jews had a monopoly on all trade in Moldavia, and therefore that economic antisemitism was justified.

During the same months, however, a scandal erupted over revelations that Golescu may have been backing a Bulgarian Revolutionary Central Committee (BRCK) to foment anti-Ottoman revolts in the Danube Vilayet. The allegations were received with concern in France, were Lionel de Moustier, the Foreign Minister, asked Romanians to report on the issue. The matter was taken up in Parliament by Carp, in clashes with Brătianu, where the junior deputy issued warnings about the consolidation of Pan-Slavism around Romania. The Assembly eventually followed the minister's explanation, voting to reject Carp's accusations as false; the liberal press followed suit, claiming that Carp was using the "Bulgarian bands" issue and the "Israelite question" to filibuster. However, in April–May, news of antisemitic repression gave Factionalists in the Senate an opportunity to demand that government present its diplomatic correspondence for senatorial review. This request erupted into a conflict between Assembly and Senate, with the former controlled by the "Reds" and Brătianu.

Much debate between the two houses involved concession awarded by government for the creation of a Romanian railways system, with Senate questioning the details of such grants. The incipient scandal, or "Strousberg Affair", began on May 16 (New Style: May 28), when rapporteur Constantin Hurmuzachi pleaded for subcontracting to the Prussian venture capitalists, Bethel Strousberg and Abraham Oppenheim. According to Nicor, the Assembly had a vested interest: "the deputies, as men of the people, with few means at their disposal, [wanted] something to take them from the provinces to the capital and vice versa, [...] whereas Senate, made up of bigwigs, fat cats with incomes of no less than 800 ducats, people of inspired pockets, most of them owners of coaches and postilions in bandit clothes, wanted to censure the rabble's taste for traveling and pulled off that blunder that was heard around the country." The liberals at Românul also described Senate as obstructionist and driven by "personal interest", "putting the nation at risk of having no railways."

== Campaign ==
The dispute then turned to different readings of the Constitution: following a literal interpretation and breaking with established procedure, Senate asked to be involved in the passing of financial regulation. Conservative senators also attacked General Golescu for tolerating new antisemitic incidents which threatened to upset diplomatic gains; meanwhile, in the Assembly, Panait Donici tried to push through a new law banning Jews from commercial life. On May 31 (June 12), an alliance of Factionalist and "White" senators drafted a motion of no confidence; of the 54 elected and ex officio members present for that session, 32 voted in favor, 8 against, and 14 abstained. Assembly deputies reacted and, on July 1 (July 13), vetoed the motion, returning advantage to the "Reds".

Two days later, Domnitor Carol took notice that government had the deputies' confidence, and proceeded to dissolve the upper chamber. Upon leaving the session, outgoing legislators were followed and booed by a group of "Reds" recruited from the lower classes of Bucharest. Elections for a new Senate were immediately called in by Golescu. In his circular letter to the prefectures, Brătianu argued that convening elections had been imperative, since the Assembly had been "dealt a blow in its prerogatives". Assembly and government, he argued, had the authority to dissolve Senate, preventing the state from "descending into paralysis, if not indeed dissolution." The message was also carried by poet Dimitrie Bolintineanu, the liberal candidate in Ismail, who wrote to his voters that: "Everything [should be] done for the country and nothing can be achieved without union and harmony between parties and government".

Reportedly, the original interval for the election was July 3–5 (New Style: July 15–17), but these were postponed by 4 days. Officially, this was because several town halls had failed to register voters on such short notice. According to Nicor, cancellation was requested by the Commune of Bucharest, allowing the "fathers of the city" to sanitize the streets and thus hope to impress the voters. Nicor also argues that Golescu and Brătianu's pick of a dog-days schedule decreased the likelihood of "Whites" being elected. Comparatively wealthier voters "have this comfort of traveling abroad to relieve themselves of the boredom in these here parts", while committed middle-class clients "fell into somnolence." Reportedly, the trend had been noticed in advanced by conservative writer Cezar Bolliac, whose Trompetta Carpaților urged "boyars" not to take their leave. Other conservative and Factionalist voices were more confident: the newspaper Térra published a forecast that said "just about every electoral college" would vote against Golescu. Similarly, Dreptatea predicted that the government "would be unable to exert any moral influence [on the electorate]."

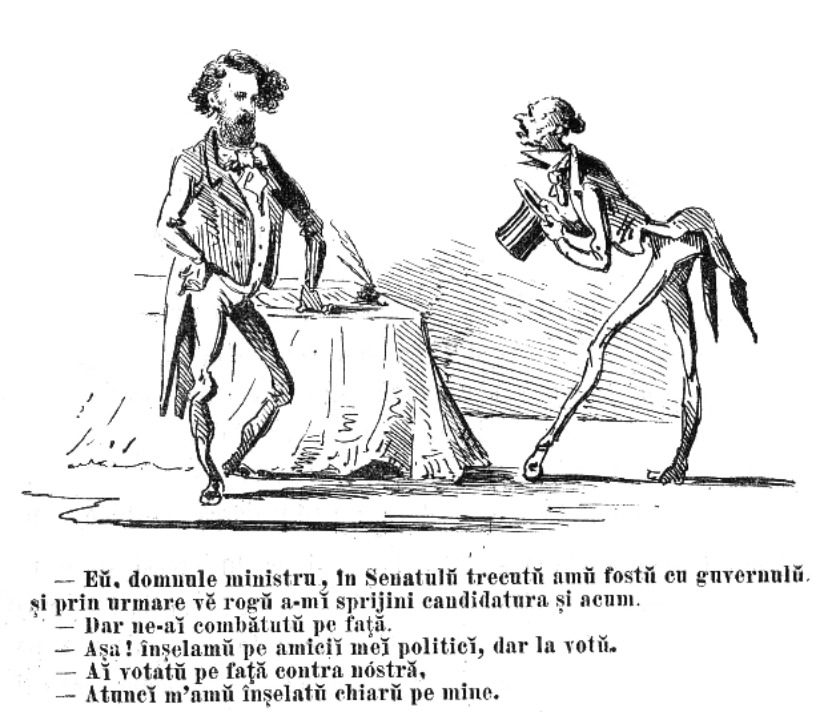
Rogue senator groveling to Ion Brătianu, asking for endorsement ahead of the election. Ghimpele cartoon of July 1868

The campaign was not entirely uneventful, with a scandal over accusations of lèse-majesté by the newspaper Strechia, and a deputation of Bucharest entrepreneurs asking Carol to uphold press freedoms. Campaigning became harsh in Râmnicu Sărat County, where Alexandru Plagino, a conservative First-College candidate, accused the "Reds" of undignified attacks. Voting also coincided with a new alert over revolutionary activities in Romania. As "all eyes were set on the election", it was discovered that a Bulgarian Romanian cell, revolving around Hadzhi Dimitar and Stefan Karadzha, had prepared a military raid over the Danube from their base in Pietroșani. As revealed by later investigations, the BRCK had a secret covenant, the "Sacred Coalition", signed with members of the "Red" party elite—including Grigore Serrurie and Eugeniu Carada. Such incidents sparked indignation in the conservative press, which saw its claim about Pan-Slavist subversion apparently confirmed.

== Results ==
Absentee voters were a major problem: most precincts failed to produce 100 electors, and some also struggled to meet the 25 minimum required by law. Some seats were taken after complicated runoff procedures. At Iași, Factionalist leader Nicolae Ionescu faced Filaret Scriban and won 35 votes to 34, with an additional blank vote between them. The issue was settled during a token repeat vote, confirming Ionescu's victory only because Scriban's voters had left the hall in-between rounds. Similarly, the Senate seat assigned to the University of Bucharest, widely believed to be a secure win for the liberal Constantin Bosianu, remained vacant, with most teaching staff absent for the vote. Some, including incumbent senator Alexandru Orăscu, reportedly abstained on purpose. The University of Iași seat went to Ștefan Micle after another postponed election.

The overall tally of votes for each competing camp is hard to assess, due to the intermittent custom of presenting senators as independent of party politics. Disputes raged at the time about Golescu's decision to designate his "government candidates", in defiance of established practice. This allowed some tallies to be published after, and even during, the election. Românul of July 22 counted 4 of 33 Second College senators as belonging to the old "White" and Factionalist opposition, decisively "a condemnation of how the old Senators had handled themselves." Of the 29 pro-government victors, 28 had "Red" credentials. In neighboring Austria-Hungary, the Romanian-language newspaper Telegrafulu Romanu noted during the late stages of the tally that, in the Second College, "of 33 senators only 10 are old ones" (as in: incumbents or senior senators); in the First College, "it would appear [...] that incumbents from the previous senate are in the minority." The few solid wins for the "Whites" included Ilfov's First College, which went to the arch-conservative Ioan Manu. He defeated Nicolae Nicolescu 39 votes to 8 (other counts have 38 to 10).

On July 23, shortly before reporting on the Bulgarians' defeat by the Ottoman Army at Ruschuk, Havas announced that: "The Senate elections, in the first college, have favored the government. Despite the reelection of opposition doyens, the Senate majority was taken by government." The political majority for both Colleges was somewhat established deductively: on July 26, Telegrafulu indicated that the majority was yet to be determined, while commenting that political parties in Romania were overall "useless", even counterproductive for tackling the economic and social hurdles faced by a young country. However, a day later, Havas reported that "three quarters of the candidates elected favor the current government." Nicor noted with satisfaction that the new Senate was "if not scarlet red, then at least reddish or pink." Historian Silvia Marton also writes that "radical liberals" had a "wide majority". The near-complete list of senators, carried in the daily press of mid and late July, appeared as follows:

County	Second College	First College
Argeș	G. Perdicaru	Nicu Rosetti-Bălănescu
Bacău	Milicescu	N/A
Bolgrad	P. Dimancea	Grigore Caracaș (replacing Costache Bălcescu, the original winner)
Botoșani	Vasile Niculescu	Radu Constantin Golescu
Brăila	N. M. Mihăhiescu	Col. Rativanu
Buzău	Eugeniu Predescu	Sibicianu
Cahul	Constantin Caramanliu	Anusiu
Covurlui	Col. Lupașcu	Alexandru "Alecu" Moruzi
Dâmbovița	Pana Olănescu (wins over Manolescu 35 to 27)	Scarlat Ghica
Dolj	Nicolae S. Guranu (wins 46 to 6)	Gheorghe D. Aman (wins over Constantin N. Brăiloiu 27 to 6)
Dorohoi	Ioan Docanu (Docan)	George Cantemir
Fălciu	Gen. Nicolae Golescu	Also Golescu
Gorj	Col. Crasnaru (wins 51 to 3)	Col. Teodor Călinescu
Ialomița	Col. Ștefan Cristofor Stoika	G. Moscu
Iași	Nicolae Ionescu (wins over Filaret Scriban 35 to 34)	Nicolae Drossu
Ilfov	M. Anghielovici (wins 123 to 24)	Ioan Manu (wins over Nicolae Nicolescu; 39 to 8 or 38 to 10)
Ismail	Dimitrie Bolintineanu	Col. Alexandru Cernat
Mehedinți	Gen. Christian Tell	Gheorghe Costaforu
Muscel	Anton Gugiu	Filaret Scriban (unanimous vote)
Neamț	A. Sicleanu	Grigore Balș (election investigated)
Olt	Constantin Deleanu (wins 30 to 15)	Gen. Constantin Năsturel-Herescu
Prahova	Ion Radovici (wins 46 to 6)	N/A
Putna	Asanache Panfile (wins 35 to 34)	Costin Catargi
Râmnicu Sărat	Alexandru D. Pîcleanu	Alexandru Plagino
Roman	Nicolae Ionescu	N/A
Romanați	Constantin Vlădoianu	Col. Ștefan Vlădoianu (wins over Grigore Jianu 16 to 14)
Suceava	Gheorghe Miller	Alecu Millo
Tecuci	Eliodor (or Heliodor) Lapati	Alexandru Vidrașcu
Teleorman	Col. Păucescu	Vasile Boerescu
Tutova	Georgie Milaru	Dumitru Cerchez
University of Bucharest	vacant	
University of Iași	Ștefan Micle	
Vâlcea	Constantin D. Oteteleșanu	Nae Călinescu
Vaslui	Col. Gavril Pangrati	Col. Ion Stavri Brătianu
Vlașca	Ștefan Golescu	Col. Grigore Lăcusteanu

== Aftermath ==
Immediately after the Senate election, Ștefan Golescu resigned from his Assembly seat in Ilfov's Second College (including Bucharest). Registered voters were asked to meet for by-elections in Ghica Square in the evening of July 13 (July 25), a date again postponed for the morning of July 14 (26). They ended up electing the entrepreneur Matache Atanasiu, while a similar election for the Second College of Vâlcea went to Dumitru Filip. Deputy elections also took place for the Third Colleges of Covurlui and Mehedinți. The results were still being tabulated as the cabinet was facing Ottoman scrutiny over its complicity in the Pietroșani affair. After defeating the BRCK, Mehmed Sabri Pasha pressed Bucharest to answer specific questions about how the invasion could take place. An anonymous report, carried by various French newspapers, noted that there was a "certain affectation" in how General Golescu responded to Sabri's demands, and claimed that Romanian authorities had created the incident, then the BRCK's repression, precisely to convince Europe that they did not approve of Pan-Slavism. Investigation into the issue continued during August, by which time Panait Costache, the Bulgarian Mayor of Bucharest, "was accused by one of the local families of having played a very active part in organizing and arming Bulgarian bands"; Costache dismissed the claim as libel.

Returning from vacation with its solidified "Red" majority, Parliament resumed work with extraordinary sessions on September 2 (September 14), 1868. This reopening took place at the same time as the spread of rumors about 330 Bulgarian revolutionaries crossing over into Ottoman territory—dismissed by the authorities as "pure invention". Four days later, Senate had verified the tallies and mandates in most precincts, validating senators; Ștefan Golescu was voted Senate Chairman. With Gheorghe Miller as rapporteur, it also proceeded to debate and vote on railway concessions, validating the Assembly verdict: 39 senators voted in favor, 5 against, with only one abstention (Plagino). This vote was again mired by controversy, as four "members of the old majority"—Ionescu, Plagino, Gheorghe Costaforu and Christian Tell—apparently conspired to filibuster, including by bringing up issues related to the July campaign; Ionescu also insisted that the Assembly was driving the country bankrupt, and urged his colleagues to take lessons in political economy. Ordinary activity only resumed for both chambers on November 15 (November 27), five days after work officially started on Strousberg's Bucharest—Galați railway line.

Despite such consolidation, internationally and locally the government was still weak. During the parliamentary vacation, Agenor de Gramont was instructed by France's government to meet with Alexandru Ioan Cuza, the exiled former Domnitor, and discuss his potential return on the throne in Bucharest. Brătianu was still disliked abroad, for both his antisemitic past and his new endeavors, including overtures to Prussia which angered France; at home, Carol was becoming unsure of his minister's competence. On September 21 (October 3), an antisemitic mob, tacitly supported by Romanian Police, ransacked Jewish property in Galați. The affair ended with government deposing the local head of police and compensating the victims. Meanwhile, Golescu's celebration of Romanian nationalism proved encouraging for the Romanian communities in Austria-Hungary, which threatened the empire's survival. The Prime Minister of Hungary, Gyula Andrássy, openly asked Prussia to censure the Domnitor, or risk an alliance between Austria-Hungary and France. A French envoy to Romania, Paul Lamy, was also adamant that Carol and his government were equally involved in the conspiracy to arm the BRCK, and that Carol was using his connections in Prussia for this very purpose. In November, Carol and his Prime Minister attempted to quell diplomatic protests by visiting Sabri Pasha at his residence in Ruschuk.

This show of loyalty failed to convince the European powers, with Prussia joining in to ask for Golescu's ouster. Later that month, as Senate was again returning to work, and having been notified of the Domnitor's opposition, General Golescu resigned, then replaced his brother as the Senate leader; Brătianu was elected Assembly President. "White" leader Dimitrie Ghica took over government, and inaugurated a longer interval of conservative rule, with backing from Concordia defector Mihail Kogălniceanu. According to some accounts, there was a brief stalemate between the two camps, but only because Brătianu expected to be returned into office. In November, Ghica reassured the Ottoman government of its "loyalty and conciliatory intent", moving in to punish "Red" dissenters such as General Alexandru D. Macedonski, and calling for new elections in March 1869.

Celebrated by Cezar Bolliac as a "constructive coalition", the new cabinet announced that it would punish antisemitic outbursts, but also that it would uproot "Jewish colonies" in Romania. This stance was backed over the following months by a new string of expulsions and the official censure of Jewish self-help organizations, including assimilated bodies. Such overtures notwithstanding, and despite winning decisively in the March elections, "cohabitation was impossible" between "Reds" and "Whites"; Ghica became the radicals' "hobbyhorse". The Prime Minister was permanently contested from the left, and deplored the parliamentary situation as a "war among brethren". Marginalized "Reds", now frustrated by the Domnitor's rejection of their other policies, explored conspiratorial ventures—leading, in 1870, to the short and bloodless rebellion known as "Republic of Ploiești".
