= 1867 Romanian general election =

- December 1867 (New Style: December 1867 – January 1868)

All c. 60 eligible seats in the Senate All 157 seats in the Assembly of Deputies
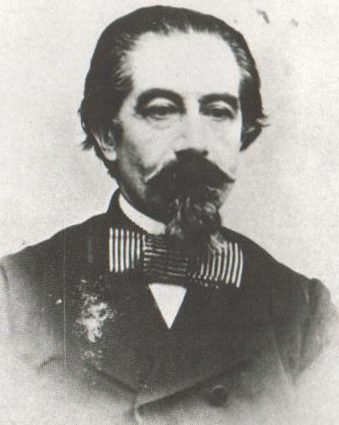

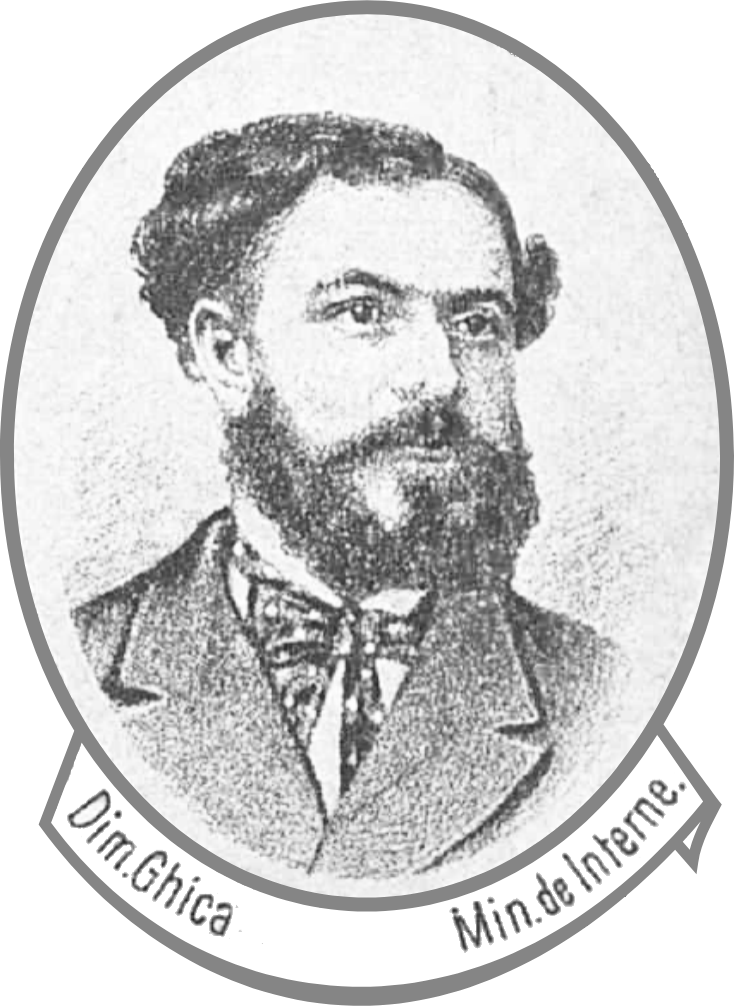

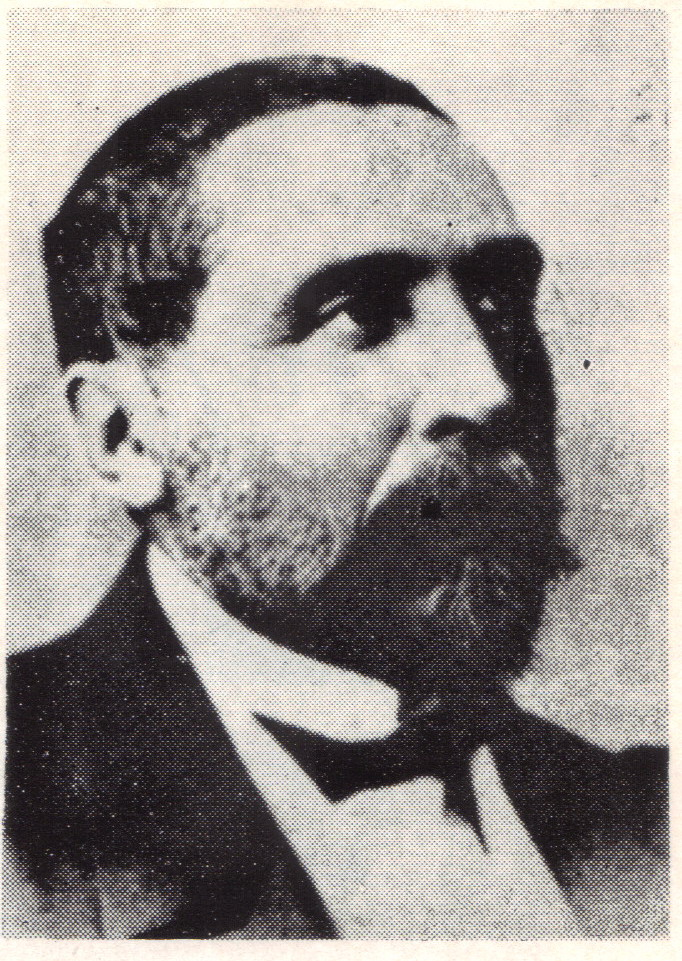
	First party	Second party	Third party
Leader	Ștefan Golescu	Dimitrie Ghica	Ion Ghica
Party	Concordia Agreement (incl. Free and Independent Faction)	"Whites"	Moderate liberals
Leader since	1867	1866	1866
Leader's seat	Ilfov	Ilfov	Mehedinți/ Teleorman
Last election	c. 40 D	c. 60 D	c. 20 D
Seats won	85 D	34 D	30 D
Seat change	▲ c. 45 D	▼ c. 26 D	▲ c. 10 D
- Composition of the Assembly after the election; Factionalists (Concordia allies) in orange, other Independents in grey

General elections were held in Romania in December 1867 (New Style: December 1867 – January 1868), and were won by a coalition of liberal-and-radical groups, or "Concordia Agreement", formed around incumbent Prime Minister Ștefan Golescu. Concordia brought together the left-leaning "Reds", the Free and Independent Faction, and a moderate liberal section under Mihail Kogălniceanu. The latter split the moderate vote, ensuring defeat for the opposition led by Ion Ghica, which came in third, after the conservative "Whites". The reconfiguration made the country more governable, at a time of financial crisis and riotous disputes over the issue of Jewish emancipation. Controversially, Concordia sought to win over and appease antisemitic voters, although it was itself divided between more and less pliable antisemites.

The elections for the Assembly are often described as fraudulent, with the main culprit being Golescu's Interior Minister, Ion Brătianu; in the Senate race, the accusations of fraud were reciprocal. Despite the liberal sweep, "Reds" suffered significant defeats, for instance in Ilfov County, where their candidate Nicolae Haralambie failed to win against Dimitrie Ghica. The national campaign was also steeped in violence, with antisemitic riots in Tutova (following the mysterious death of electee Scarlat Vârnav) and Ialomița County. A far-reaching dispute involved the results in Prahova, where Concordia allegedly used military force to ensure its victory. Disputes over the validation of deputies and senators, including Manolache Costache Epureanu, Petru Grădișteanu and Bogdan Petriceicu Hasdeu, continued into the early months of 1868.

Although victorious, Concordia was eventually brought down by the Factionalists, once Brătianu shunned their violent antisemitism. Reformed by General Nicolae Golescu, who succeeded his brother as prime minister, the "Reds" still secured a win in the Senate elections of July 1868. Eventually, however, they lost favor with Domnitor Carol I. The liberal ascendancy ended during the general election of March 1869, which placed the country under a "White" government.

== Context ==
In February 1866, Romania (as the United Principalities had been designated since 1864) was governed by a "monstrous coalition" of "Reds", "Whites" and moderates, chaired by Ion Ghica. Created by a coup which toppled the authoritarian Domnitor Alexandru Ioan Cuza, it supervised the April elections—under the preordained assumption that Assembly seats would be evenly split between the "right" and the "left". The Central Electoral Committee, presided upon by the radical doctrinaire C. A. Rosetti, attempted fraud in various regions (including Prahova County); however, the resulting Assembly was overall dominated by the "Whites". At the time, separatism and Cuza loyalism flared up in Western Moldavia, where a riot—instigated by Calinic Miclescu, Nicu Ceaur-Aslan, Teodor Boldur-Lățescu, and Constantin Moruzi Pecheanu—was quelled by the Romanian Land Forces.

In a parallel plebiscite, Romanians overwhelmingly voted to recognize Carol of Hohenzollern, a German prince, as their new hereditary Domnitor. The regime also instituted Parliament's upper chamber, by reestablishing Cuza's Romanian Senate. Ghica was reconfirmed as Prime Minister, his government claiming to be "neither right- nor left-wing". His position was weakened by swing deputies and separatist nostalgia, and also by other hurdles: a financial crisis (which had the state borrowing from private bankers), a cholera outbreak, and a localized famine. Moreover, major disputes raged over constitutional details. One point of contention was the status of Romanian Jews, with various "Reds" and Moldavians emerging as the core opponents of emancipation and advocates of "ethnic protectionism". Therefore, in its final form, the Constitution of July only granted citizenship to Christians, thus reverting a more tolerant Civil Code proclaimed under Cuza.

There were repeat elections in November, producing a multicolored Assembly, ridiculed in liberal circles as a "tutti frutti" legislature. According to one count of Assembly seats, the radicals shared about 40 seats with their Moldavian allies, or "Free and Independent Faction"; there was a conservative majority of approximately 60 seats, but segmented into competing blocs; Ghica's moderate liberals could only count on some 20 deputies. Another count suggests that Ghica was backed by one third of the Assembly, while the liberals, as the loyal opposition, had another third. Those who rejected the system, be they Cuza loyalists or Moldavian separatists, shared between them the remainder. Overall, "there were great clashes of vision between the Assembly majority and the cabinet, as well as between the minority and the cabinet." The election was criticized from the liberal left as fraudulent in favor of the conservatives and moderates, but other contemporaries generally view it as free and fair. Over the next months, however, disputes blocked the validation of various deputies, contributing to the uncertainty of governance.

In March 1867 the radicals were able to seal the Concordia Agreement, allying them with the Free and Independent Faction, chaired by Nicolae Ionescu, and a group of moderate liberals under Mihail Kogălniceanu (who commended the allegiance of 25 deputies). Tacitly endorsed by Domnitor Carol, this new coalition was backed by a plurality of Assembly members, eventually pushing Ghica to resign. His "Red" replacement, Constantin A. Kretzulescu, was nominally a moderate, but the Minister of Internal Affairs, Ion Brătianu, was a "Red" doctrinaire and power-broker, sometimes described as the cabinet's true leader. Possibly pressured by his conditional allies, the antisemitic Factionalists, he also pushed orders to evict Jewish "vagabonds" from the countryside, which sparked an international scandal.

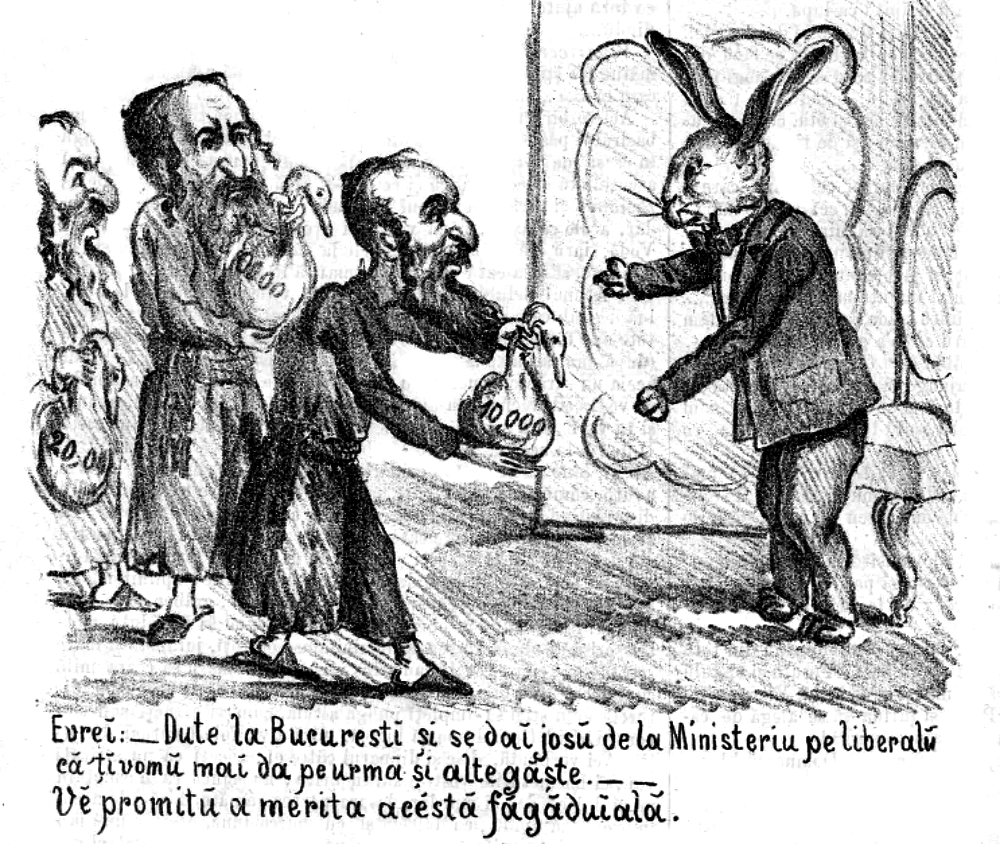
November 1867 cartoon in Ghimpele, the "Red" magazine: the "White" party, represented by a rabbit-faced Manolache Costache Epureanu, taking Jewish bribes to "bring down the liberal Ministry"

By late May, Brătianu had to deal with "White" defiance, manifested when senator Petre Mavrogheni of Iași County handed in his resignation. Electors refused to turn up, and sent him a letter expressing contempt that he even organized a scrutiny. The radicalism of government officials was also fomenting an international crisis, once it became apparent that Brătianu was backing the Bulgarian Revolutionary Central Committee (BRCK) against the Ottoman Empire—which was still Romania's suzerain power. In April, when Panayot Hitov led a BRCK guerrilla force into the Danube Vilayet at Oltenița, the Ottomans began openly calling for Kretzulescu to step down. The Jewish evictions were especially unpopular within the French Empire, to which the liberals looked for guidance, and soon Brătianu's "demagoguery" was castigated by his allies, including Ștefan Golescu and Dimitrie Sturdza. The latter sought to have Brătianu removed by switching to Ghica's party, and eventually prompted his adversary to resign in July.

During the parliamentary break, Brătianu's resignation continued to undermine political stability. In July, Factionalists Ceaur-Aslan and Nicolae Iamandi, alongside Grigore Sturdza, published an appeal for the establishment of a regional Moldavian caucus that would defy "Red" centralism (other signatories included Grigore Balș, Panait Balș, Grigore Vârnav, and Colonel Pavlov). This initiative was rejected by Kretzulescu and Brătianu, who noted that it infringed on the Constitution. Faced with the crumbling of his alliances, Kretzulescu ultimately resigned in August. Cuza loyalist Ioan Emanoil Florescu was excited by this opportunity, writing to the exiled former Domnitor that anarchy would result in a regime change. Instead, liberal-radicals formed a new governing coalition, which required them to encourage a maximalist version of Romanian nationalism, supporting "Greater Romania" or "Dacia"—namely, the incorporation of Transylvania and other Romanian-inhabited territories of Austria-Hungary. The cause was advanced by Bogdan Petriceicu Hasdeu and Alexandru Candiano-Popescu, who put out the political newspaper Perseverența. In summer 1867, Hasdeu traveled across Transylvania to "assess the conditions for a probable insurrection." He viewed himself as a future "Red" minister, noting in 1871 that the "Dacian ideal" was being more openly promoted by that party by 1868.

In October, Golescu officially took over as prime minister, and Brătianu was able to regain influence, eventually resuming his position at Internal Affairs. After filibustering by the "White" deputy Manolache Costache Epureanu, Golescu agreed to dissolve the Assembly and called in new elections, noting that the slim majority he had could not support a government in the long run. According to researcher Constantin Gane, Brătianu had actually wanted, and worked for, early elections. "The liberal party", he argues, "wanted a Chamber of its own, one that had eluded its grasp for six years, ever since 1862". Golescu's message was followed on November 29 by Brătianu's circular letter to the prefects, carried in Monitorul Oficial. Claiming that government had put up no candidates of its own, it asked functionaries to exercise a "moral influence" over the electorate, to produce a result in accordance with the national interest—generally seen as code for an election fraud through intimidation.

== Campaign and results ==
=== Early rounds ===
The election was the second one in history to be held under the census suffrage (and weighted voting) law of July 1866, with a two-round system where simple majorities were not decided in one session. The First College comprised voters who owned more than 300 ducats in property, and the Second included those who declared 100–300 ducats; they each elected 33 deputies with direct elections. The Third College corresponded roughly to a "third estate", specifically designed for urban constituencies, directly electing 58 deputies in proportion to the respective town population. A Fourth College, representing taxpayers not comprised in the other categories, designated 33 of the total 157 deputies through electors. In 1866–1867, there was a 1:50 ratio of electors to registered voters.

In the Assembly, where the main rounds took place on December 22–26 (Old Style: December 10–14), the results were a landslide win for Concordia: Concordia men had 85 seats between them. In particular, the election was a victory for "Red" hardliners, including Rosetti and Eugeniu Carada (elected in Ilfov's Third and Fourth College, respectively; Carada had 536 votes to 17), but also Gogu Cantacuzino (in Prahova's Fourth College, 550 votes to 9) and Perseverența's Candiano-Popescu (in Cahul's Fourth College, with 79 votes to 5). In Prahova, where liberals were especially strong and well-organized, the liberal ascendancy was complete, with all seats going to "Reds": Anton I. Arion, industrialist Matache Nicolau, and Ploiești mayor Constantin T. Grigorescu were also returned by the Third College, as was Corneliu Lapati by the Second. A "total triumph" for both houses of Parliament was also boasted by the liberal chapter of Argeș County, where George T. Brătianu and Constantin Hurmuzachi were sent to the Assembly. In some locations, the contest was said to have been mired in dubious practices. One such case was the Fourth College of Vlașca, where the "Red" Grigore Serrurie faced the incumbent, Cezar Bolliac. Rumors recorded by Ghimpele suggest that Bolliac was treating peasant voters to bagels and shots of țuică; in addition, both candidates were alleged to have used ballot stuffing, with the final tallies showing more votes than there were registered voters.

A complete "Red" victory was rendered impossible by several contributing factors, including Factionalist independence. According to one approximation by Ghimpele magazine, the Free and Independent Faction had 14 of the majority deputies: Ionescu, Anastasie Fătu, Alexandru Gheorghiu, Alecu D. Holban, Theodor Lateș, Dimitrie Tacu, Nicolae Voinov, Ianache Lecca, Dumitru Lupașcu, Ioan Negură, Mantu Rufu, Petre Suciu, I. Strejescu, and Dumitru Țanu Vidrașcu. Three other winning candidates on the Tutova County list were a local "National Liberal Party", allied with the Faction. Ghimpele viewed the Faction as distinct from either the left, right, or center of the resulting legislature, a party "with only captains, and no footmen." The Factionalist newspaper Dreptatea celebrated a complete victory in the indirect election for Iași County's Fourth College—with "27 democrat delegates" elected, against just 2 "reactionaries".

The topic of government interference was at the heart of a polemic in Ilfov. Here, the conservative paper Țérra presented evidence that policemen and firefighters had stormed into the Athenaeum Society polling station to harass "White" voters. This account was disputed by the "Red" editors of Romanulu, who noted that the authorities had only stepped in to curb vote-buying by conservative electioneers. Nationally, Concordia experienced some major defeats: in the First College of Ilfov, government presented Nicolae Haralambie as a "National Party" candidate. He lost to the "White" leader Dimitrie Ghica, who took 94 votes (more than the absolute majority of 89); Haralambie had 67 votes, and a third-party candidate, Constantin Bosianu, only 15. Similarly, the First College of Vaslui County propelled into office a debuting "White", Petre P. Carp, who was just organizing the party chapter in Moldavia, In Dâmbovița, opposition candidates Ienache Văcărescu and Isaia Lerescu also won seats, but, according to Romanulu, both of them were unduly favored by the electoral commission. Overall, 34 deputies were conservative "Whites", and 30 more were moderates, with 8 more elected as independents.

The following is a list of Assembly election results as tabulated on December 31 (Old Style: December 19):

County	Fourth College	Third College	Second College	First College
Argeș	Costache Christescu	Gheorghe Enescu, D. Micescu	George T. Brătianu	Constantin Hurmuzachi
Bacău	C. Platon	Constantin Dimonisie, Ioan Negură	Dumitru Lupașcu	Ianache Lecca
Bolgrad	Alexandru Cociu	Bogdan Petriceicu Hasdeu	Apostol Mănescu	Ad. Parussi (Parusief)
Botoșani	Cassian Lecca	Dimitrie Christea, Panait Gheorghiade, Adam Hareto	Col. Gheorghe Adrian	Anton Caruzi
Brăila	Grigore Eliade	Radu S. Campiniu, Trandafir Djuvara	Alecu Giani	Iosif Niculescu
Buzău	Panait Iatropol	Ghiță Dăscălescu	Caloian Pleșoianu	Ion "Iancu" Marghiloman
Cahul	Alexandru Candiano-Popescu	V. Șeicaru	Al. Zeucianu	Aristid Cilibidake (Celibidache)
Covurlui	Dimitrie Tacu	P. Popasu, Procopie S. Sgrumalla, I. Strejescu	Mantu Rufu	invalidated
Dâmbovița	Gheorghie "Ghiță" Siercanescu	Isaia Lerescu (Lorescu)	Ienache (Ionache) Văcărescu	Ioan Emanoil Florescu
Dolj	Elefterie Cornetti	Gheorghe Chițu, Petru "Pera" Opran, Anastase Stolojan	Grigore Arghiropol	George Barbu Știrbei
Dorohoi	Alexandru Văsescu	Theodor Lateș	Col. Gheorghe Adrian	Turel Pisoschi
Fălciu	Dumitru Castroianu	Mihail Kogălniceanu	Dumitru Berca	Nicolae Rosetti-Bălănescu
Gorj	Petre Roșianu	undecided (vacant by January 22)	Tache Moscu	C. Săvoiu
Ialomița	Pana Buescu	Ioan Vasiliu	invalidated	N. Moscu
Iași	Petre Suciu	Constantin Corjescu, Alexandru Gheorghiu, Dumitru Gusti, Alecu D. Holban	Anastasie Fătu	Petre Mavrogheni
Ilfov	Eugeniu Carada	Dimitrie Brătianu, Ion Brătianu, Dimitrie Culoglu, Nicolae Golescu, T. Mehedințianu, C. A. Rosetti	Ștefan Golescu	Dimitrie Ghica
Ismail	George G. Fălcoianu	Alexandru Cociu	Dumitru Petre Economu	August Treboniu Laurian
Mehedinți	Nicolae Gărdăreanu	C. Cârjeu (Chirgeu), G. Miculescu	D. Genescu	Ion Ghica
Muscel	Sache Nicolau	Alexandru G. Golescu	Scarlat Turnavitu	G. Iorgulescu
Neamț	Vasile Zacharia	Dumitru Gheorghiu Șoarecu	Grigore Isăcescu	Col. Gheorghe Ruset Roznovanu
Olt	Radian Boicea	Ion Titulescu (vacant by January 22)	Gheorghe Văleanu	Gheorghe A. Polizu
Prahova	Gogu Cantacuzino	Anton I. Arion, Constantin T. Grigorescu, Matache Nicolau	Corneliu Lapati	Ioan C. Cantacuzino
Putna	Dumitru Pruncu	Dumitru Țanu (Stanu, Ztinu) Vidrașcu, Nicolae Voinov	Gheorghe Apostoleanu	none (Alecu Balș on January 22)
Râmnicu Sărat	Constantin Niculescu Catia (Câță)	Oprișian Iorgulescu	I. F. Robescu	Constantin Grădișteanu
Roman	Ion Agarici	Mihail Jora	Leon Eraclide	Vasile Alecsandri
Romanați	Achil Teocharie	Gen. Anton Berindei	V. Obedianu	Constantin Darvari
Suceava	G. Ghițescu	Constantin Morțun	Gheorghe Racoviță	none (Dumitru Cozadini on January 22)
Tecuci	Tache Anastasiu	Anton Ciucă (Cicu)	Constantin A. Racoviță	Petre Ciucă
Teleorman	Gheorghie Petrescu	George D. Vernescu	Petre Orbescu	Ion Ghica
Tutova	Scarlat (Father Sofronie) Vârnav (vacant by January 6)	P. Chenciu (Kenciu), Ion (Iancu) Codrescu, Andrei V. Ionescu	invalidated (none by January 22)	invalidated
Vâlcea	Stamati Budurescu	Scarlat Călinescu	Grigore Ioan Lahovari	Alexandru Lahovary
Vaslui	Iona Latif	Col. Dumitru Miclescu	Gheorghe Racoviță	Petre P. Carp
Vlașca	Grigore Serrurie	Nicolae "Niță" Gogoașă (or Gogoașiă)	Alexandru Lăzărescu-Laerțiu	Nae Tătăranu

=== Senate race ===
In the race for Senate, which took place on December 30 – January 3 (Old Style: December 18–22), the "Reds" faced significant difficulties. The liberal press aired allegations of fraud by the "Whites": in Olt County, a delegation of electors, including Ioan Căpitănescu, refused to cast their vote, as a sign of protest. A separate scandal took hold in the largely non-Romanian constituency of Bolgrad, where Aristid Pascal, the eventual winner, published manifestos addressing Bessarabian Bulgarians in their native tongue. Another controversy involved Romanulu, which published archive documents from the 1850s. These purportedly showed that Ioan Manu and Constantin N. Brăiloiu, both of whom ran for Senate as "Whites", had plotted a violent clampdown against liberal activists.

The votes for Senate were still counted, and in some instances still cast, during January. By January 5, ballotage in the Second Senatorial College awarded mandates to Nicolae Kretzulescu (for Ismail), Emil Casimir (Baia), Ion Pastia (Putna), and Iorgu Scorțescu (Roman); Factionalist leader Ionescu was senator for the University of Iași, and Alexandru Orăscu represented the one in Bucharest. Bishop Filaret Scriban, who had initially refrained from running (only urging his fellow Factionalists to elect "good Christians and good patriots"), ended up being voted in as a senator, both in Iași and Botoșani Counties. In Bucharest, Haralambie also presented himself as a candidate in the senatorial race for the Second College, which was only held on January 8.

Overall, in the upper chamber, the "Reds" lost to a thin majority formed by Ion Ghica's moderates and "White" conservatives. Incomplete lists for the separate precincts and two colleges of Senate appeared in the press, as follows:

County	Senators
Argeș	Dimitrie Dragoescu, Nicu Rosetti-Bălănescu
Bacău	Ion Strat
Bolgrad	Aristid Pascal, Col. S. Sabovici
Baia	Emil Casimir
Botoșani	Dumitru Mavrocordat, Filaret Scriban
Brăila	Constantin A. Kretzulescu, M. Mihăescu
Bucharest and Ilfov	Nicolae Haralambie —Alexandru Orăscu (U. Buch.)
Buzău	Col. Crasnaru, Nicolae Pâcleanu
Dâmbovița	Nicolae Ghica-Comănești, Pana Olănescu
Dolj	Constantin N. Brăiloiu, Nicolae S. Guranu
Dorohoi	Panait Casimir, George Holban
Fălciu	Scarlat Mavrogheni
Gorj	Col. Crasnaru, Col. Teodor Călinescu
Ialomița	Scarlat Kretzulescu, Col. Ștefan Cristofor Stoika
Iași	Nicolae Drossu, Filaret Scriban —Nicolae Ionescu (U. Iași)
Ismail	Col. Alexandru Cernat, Nicolae Kretzulescu
Mehedinți	Ion Oteteleșanu
Muscel	Gheorghe Costaforu, Anton Gugiu
Olt	Gen. Constantin Năsturel-Herescu, C. Văleanu
Putna	Costin Catargi, Ion Pastia
Râmnicu Sărat	Alexandru Plagino, Costache Vernescu
Roman	Iorgu Scorțescu, Grigore Vârnav
Romanați	Grigore Jianu, Constantin Vlădoianu
Tecuci	Panait Balș, Alexandru Teriachiu
Tutova	Manolache Costache Epureanu
Vâlcea	Constantin Bosianu, Petru Munteanu
Vaslui	Grigore Lăcusteanu, Nicolae Lahovari, C. I. Sturdza

== Validation disputes ==
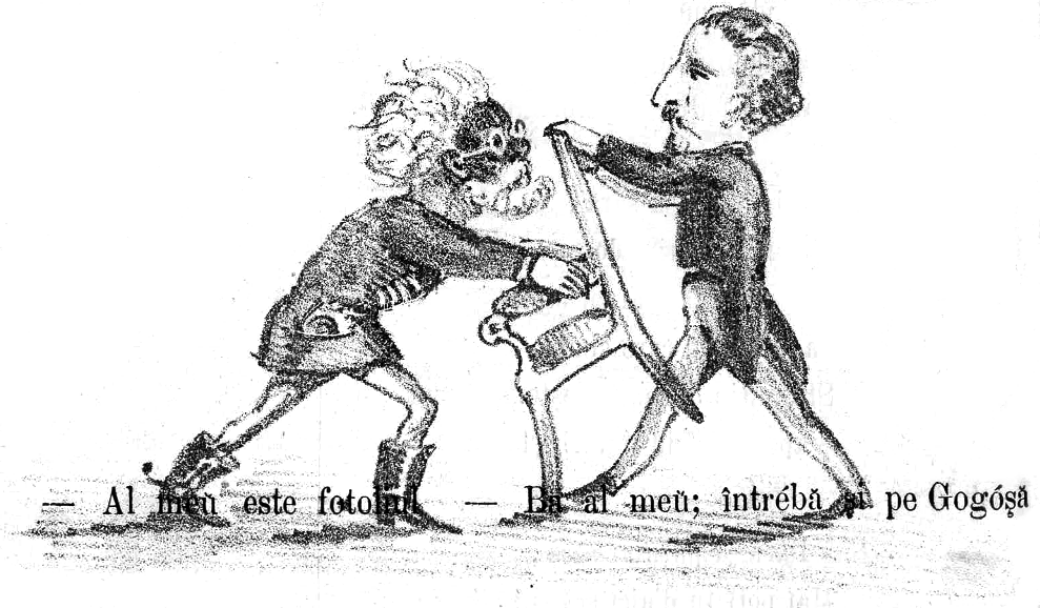
Cezar Bolliac (left) and Grigore Serrurie fighting over the Fourth College seat in Vlașca. Ghimpele cartoon of January 1, 1868

Parliament was eventually reopened on January 15 (Old Style: January 3), with Gheorghe Enescu as de facto Assembly President. Ailing, the latter relinquished office, and was replaced by General Nicolae Golescu (Ștefan's brother). Although his own "Red" subgroup was by then dominant in the lower house, Brătianu allowed a Moldavian Factionalist, Anastasie Fătu, to replace President Golescu by January 27. Senate also resumed proceedings on January 20, and, on January 24, reelected Nifon Rusailă as its Chairman.

By then, those who had their mandates confirmed were left to assess reports demanding the invalidation of other deputies and senators. Some, such as Candiano-Popescu, were very soon validated and able to take their seats; although elected for Senate, Haralambie soon gave up, after revelations that he was not of the legal age to run. Bishop Filaret, contested for legal reasons because he had been a monk, was nevertheless also accepted by Senate. Kogălniceanu's ally Ioan Emanoil Florescu was surprisingly removed from his seat following a vote by his lower-chamber colleagues.

Long conflicts ensued over the early opening of ballot boxes in various precincts. Some, including Alexandru Văsescu and Theodor Lateș, were confirmed regardless of this procedural objection. Another contentious case was litigated by Bolliac, who had lost Serrurie but still demanded to be recognized as a deputy, and had to be evicted from the Assembly; meanwhile, "Red" senator Anton Gugiu was confirmed by his peers in a special vote. According to Ghimpele, Bolliac was denied an opportunity to defend himself from the parliamentary rostrum, despite submitting thirty requests. Deputies voted 62 to 42 not to recognize his claim, but agreed to send in an investigative commission.

Another controversy erupted in Tutova County, where, on February 5, virtually all elections were still undecided. The "White" candidate for First College, Manolache Costache Epureanu, asked to be recognized as the winner, but the "Red" majority called fraud, and the seat was left vacant. His ouster was welcomed by Ghimpele as a defeat for the philosemitic camp, with Epureanu mockingly referred to as a "great rabbi of Moldavia". A related issue was that of Factionalist Scarlat Vârnav: elected as a Fourth-College deputy, he had died in suspicious circumstances—allegedly poisoned by his Jewish adversaries. While a toxicological investigation was undertaken in Bucharest, at Bârlad the matter sparked riots, attributed by "Reds" to a Jewish provocation.

In Prahova, "White" bosses Theodor C. Văcărescu and Ștefan Greceanu produced reports and telegrams alleging widespread intimidation by infantry troops and the police, including beatings and arbitrary arrests of opposition mayors and electoral agents; Văcărescu also refused to sign the procès-verbal validating Prahova's vote count, and urged the Assembly not to validate Gogu Cantacuzino's mandate. However, he himself was being brought to trial by the local prefect, Andrei Dertman, who alleged that Văcărescu had colluded with the mayor of Popești to get himself fraudulently nominated as a Fourth-College elector. Cantacuzino was finally confirmed on January 21, when the Assembly concluded that Th. C. Văcărescu's accusations were not certified by an electors' petition, as required by law. A petition signed by 21 Prahova electors was nevertheless registered on the same day. It blamed the local police chief, Stan Popescu, and "all police agents and footmen, the nightwatchmen, the subprefects with their assistants and the town-hall clerks", of conspiring to "reject and mistreat" known conservative voters. The controversy continued in a more subdued form when deputies of the opposition, including D. Ghica and George D. Vernescu, alongside G. T. Brătianu, asked for an inquiry into the Prahova affair. Local prosecutors refused to assess the case, dismissing the petition as an attempt to filibuster in the Assembly, while some petitioners backed this by withdrawing their signatures.

In Ialomița County, accusations of blood libel, issued against the local Jews, were quickly dismissed by pathologists, and publicly refuted by the liberal press. Here, the disputed place of deputy in the Second College was eventually awarded to Petru Grădișteanu by Assembly vote. Procedural controversies still surrounded Ionache Văcărescu, who was considered elected, by a slim margin, only after the voters' census was updated, and Tache Moscu, whose narrow win was contested by those who argued that a deciding write-in ballot was meant for his brother, Costache. Other disputes regarded the validation of two deputies whose Romanian citizenship was questioned: Constantin Niculescu Catia (or Câță) and Procopie S. Sgrumalla. Hasdeu's election was also contested by emissaries from the Lipovans and Greeks of Bolgrad—their petition was denied by the Assembly, since they had failed to write it in Romanian. The Senate seats of Covurlui remained contested until another race in spring, when Costache Negri became Second College senator (he resigned shortly after).

== Aftermath ==
Brătianu's claim that the election had not been fixed, and that government had "no official candidates", was endorsed by accounts in the contemporary press—local and liberal (Românul) as well as Western (La France, Le Siècle). Overall, the election was validated: in his address to the Assembly, Domnitor Carol congratulated government on running an orderly vote, and arguing that elections had been free, "only moderated by the people's own common sense." Kogălniceanu also reaffirmed his party's adherence to the "Red" party line, praising Brătianu for having "transformed the country". However, Parliament continued to host debilitating disputes, including over allegations that Golescu had sponsored "Bulgarian bands" of the BRCK to start a revolution in Danube Vilayet, as well as over the functioning of the Court of Cassation. The former accusation, which focused suspicions on the Perseverența group, led to Romania being threatened with an international commission of inquiry.

Slowly, a right-wing opposition was consolidating, revitalized by Carp and by Alexandru Lahovary, seen by Gane as "the two Benjamins of conservative politics". Antisemitism soon returned as the core issue, when, in Britain, the Earl of Derby cabinet analyzed reports that Romanian Jews were persecuted and prevented from even practicing their religion. The claim was taken up in Romania by Carp, but categorically denied by Brătianu. Government's relationship with the Factionalists was soon put the test when, on March 17, the latter introduced a harshly antisemitic bill, which was ultimately rejected by the mainstream "Reds". Asked by the Prime Minister not to voice his dissidence, Brătianu restated his ethnic nationalism, but agreed that any such xenophobic excess would ruin Romania's fragile relationship with the West.

This change of attitudes alienated the Faction, and smaller riots erupted in Moldavia, this time specifically targeting both the Jews and Prime Minister Golescu. On April 23, the latter resigned, officially for health reasons, and was replaced by his brother, General Golescu, who took an even more moderate position on the "Jewish Question". Although faced with a motion of no confidence in Senate (where an alliance of Factionalists and "Whites" was formed), he and Brătianu were able to maintain their hold on power. Their political survival was especially disappointing for a conservative hopeful, the Dolj deputy George Barbu Știrbei, who missed his opportunity to become prime minister, and left on self-imposed exile. Reportedly, his candidacy was rejected by Carol's father, the Prince Hohenzollern, who feared that Știrbei would use his status to usurp the Romanian throne.

As noted by historian Silvia Marton, "the words 'moral influence' were destined to have an enviable presence in posterity." Brătianu unwittingly coined a euphemism for "the systematic government pressure that will characterize the [electoral] regime at the very least until World War I." Gane also notes that the practice of "restricting voters" only had one precedent (the Moldavian elections of July 1857), but that, after 1867, it "made a name for itself". During similarly organized elections in late July, the conservatives also lost the Senate, ensuring that "Reds" completely dominated Parliament to March 1869, when the "White" party returned in a landslide of its own. The sudden fall of radicalism, the loss of favor with Domnitor Carol, and the breakup of Concordia pushed Brătianu and Candiano-Popescu into conspiratorial politics—leading to the rebellious episode known as "Republic of Ploiești".
