= Cuejdiu oil field =

Oil field in Neamț County, Romania

Cuejdiu
- Country: Romania
- Region: Neamț County
- Offshore/onshore: onshore
- Operator: Aurelian Oil & Gas, Romgaz, Europa Oil & Gas

Field history
- Discovery: 2010
- Start of development: 2010
- Start of production: 2012

Production
- Current production of oil: 10,000 barrels per day (~5.0×10^{5} t/a)
- Estimated oil in place: 20 million tonnes (~ 24×10^{6} m^{3} or 150 million bbl)
- Estimated gas in place: 2.6×10^{9} m^{3} 92×10^{9} cu ft

The Cuejdiu oil field is an oil field located in Gârcina, Neamț County. It was discovered in 2010 and developed by Aurelian Oil & Gas. It will begin production in 2012 and will produce oil. The total proven reserves of the Cuejdiu oil field are from 150 million barrels (20 million tonnes) to 300 million barrels (40 million tonnes), and production is slated to be centered on 10,000 barrels per day (1,600 m^{3}/d).
