= Gârcina mine =

Potash mine

- Location: Gârcina, Neamț County, Romania
- Products: Potash

The Gârcina mine is a large potash mine located in eastern Romania in Neamț County, close to Gârcina. Gârcina represents one of the largest potash reserves in Romania having estimated reserves of 300 million tonnes of ore grading 10% potassium chloride metal.
