= Melchisedec Ștefănescu =

Romanian bishop and historian (1823–1892)

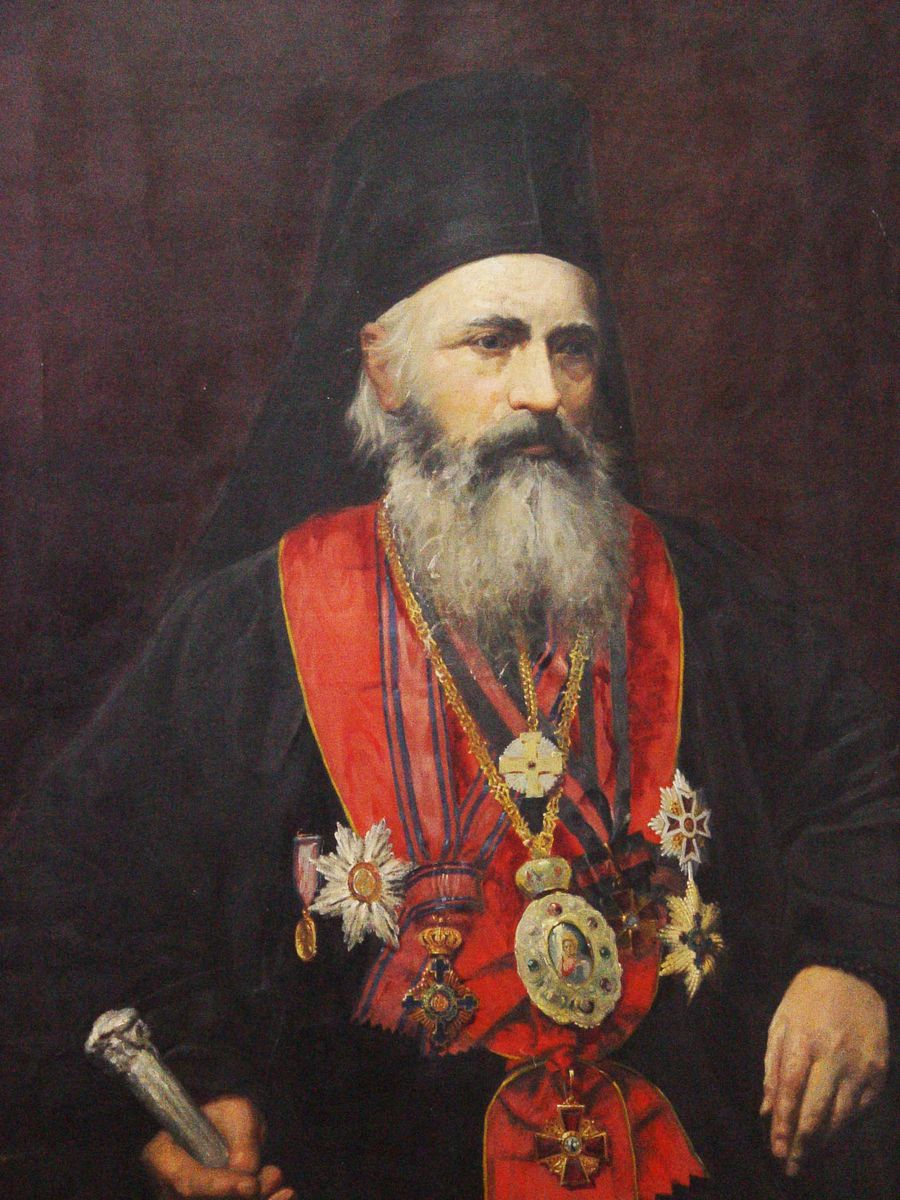
Melchisedec Ștefănescu

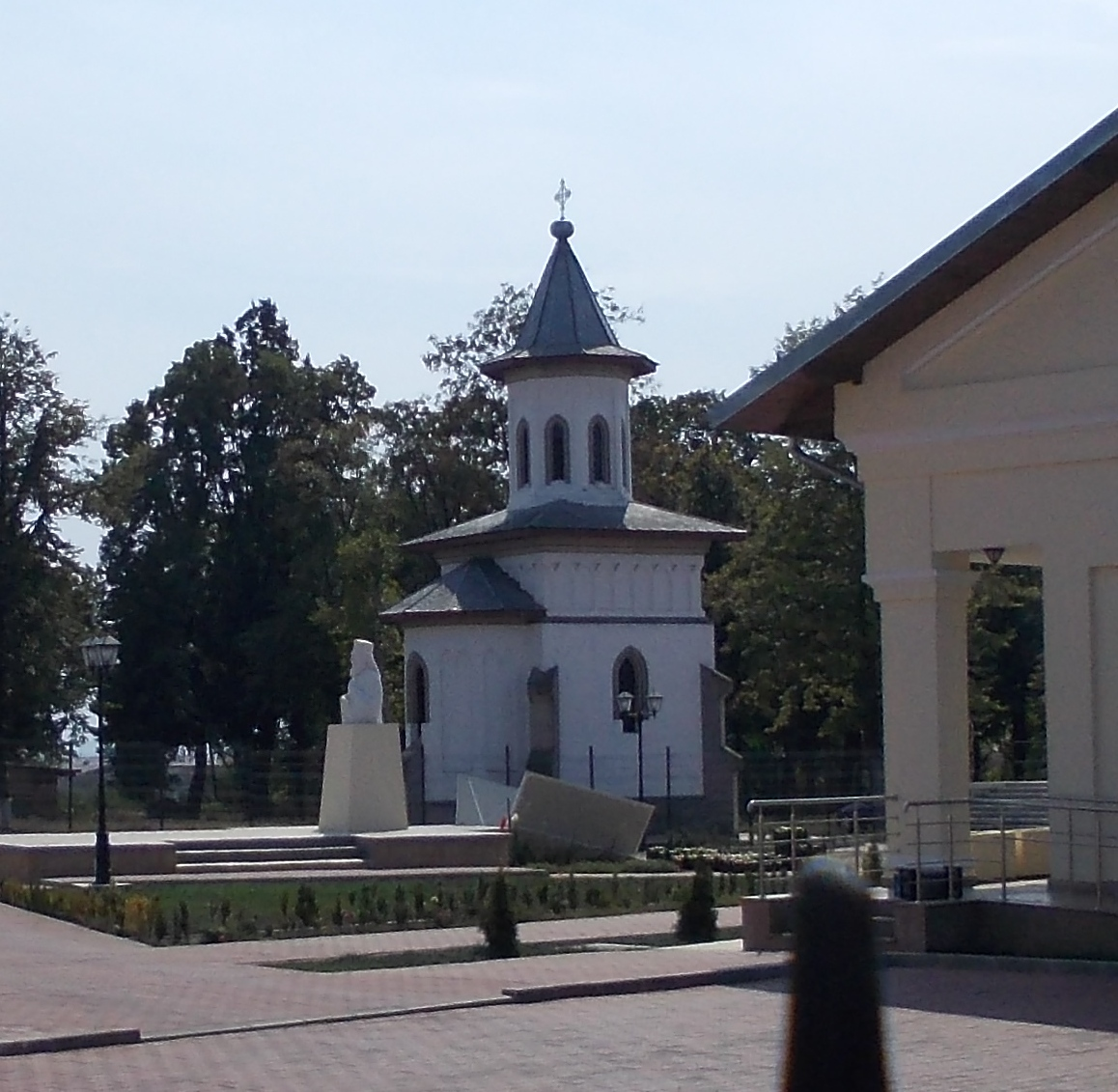
The chapel in Roman dedicated to Ștefănescu; his statue is at left.

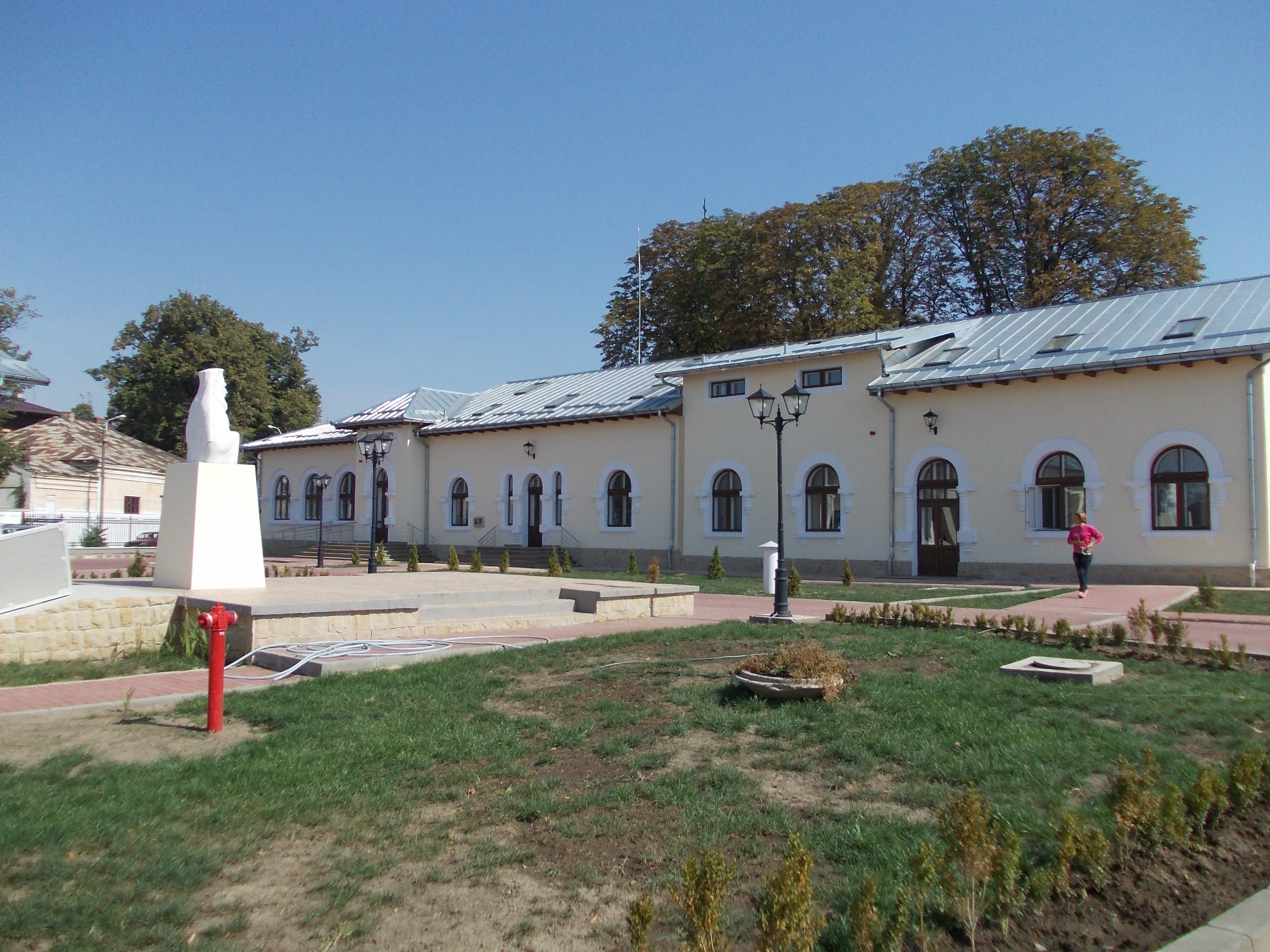
The nearby Melchisedec Foundation

Melchisedec Ștefănescu (Romanian pronunciation: [ˌmelkiseˈdek ʃtefəˈnesku]; born Mihail Ștefănescu [mihaˈil]; 27 February [O.S. 15 February] 1823 – 28 May [O.S. 16 May] 1892) was a Moldavian, later Romanian historian and bishop of the Romanian Orthodox Church. A native of the Piatra Neamț area, he was educated at Iași and in Kiev. After a decade of teaching seminary, he became a bishop, serving at Huși, Ismail, briefly in Galați and then in Roman until his death. He was involved in politics, especially around the time the United Principalities came into being, and was a steadfast supporter of Alexandru Ion Cuza's reforms, including the secularization of monastic estates. A historian appreciated by his peers, Melchisedec published over sixty works. After his death, his property and money went toward setting up the Romanian Academy Library, sending students on scholarship to Imperial Russia and establishing a foundation that continues its activities in Roman.

== Biography ==
Born in Gârcina, near Piatra Neamț in Moldavia, he was descended from a line of priests. He studied at Socola Monastery's seminary in Iași, attending between 1834 and 1841 and in 1842–1843. He subsequently became a monk at age twenty, taking on the name of Melchisedec. His first post was as a teacher in Șerbești village from 1841 to 1842; this was followed by a stint as substitute professor at Socola from 1843 to 1848. He was sent to study at the Kiev Theological Academy in 1848, graduating in 1851 with a master's degree in theology and literature. Ordained a deacon at Socola in 1844, he was made a priest at the Kiev Pechersk Lavra in 1851. He undertook study visits to Odessa and Saint Petersburg, undertaking library research and perfecting his Russian-language skills.

In 1852, after returning home, Melchisedec was made deputy archimandrite, rising to archimandrite in 1856 and being consecrated bishop in 1862. He taught at Socola from 1851 to 1856, and from that point until 1861, was teacher and director at the seminary in Huși. As a seminary teacher, he published numerous textbooks, mainly translated from Russian. His first period in charge of a diocese lasted from 1861 to 1864, when he was acting Bishop of Huși.

As early as 1856, Melchisedec began campaigning for the union between Moldavia and Wallachia, publishing a pamphlet that aimed to convince Romanian society of the wisdom of such a step. His fellow bishop Neofit Scriban wrote a similar piece, bringing the two into conflict with Ecumenical Patriarch Cyril VII. The following year, already famous throughout Moldavia, he was elected as one of four clergy representatives to the ad-hoc divan, actively participating in the union process. The deputies drafted a program for church reform, calling for autocephaly, a solution to the problem of foreign-owned monasteries and an end to the election of foreign bishops. Taken together, the document stressed the need to end dependence on Constantinople and establish an autonomous national church fit for a nation in the process of creating its political self-governance.

In 1859, as the "United Principalities" came into existence, Melchisedec joined the committee for nationalizing the monasteries' holdings. Together with Mihail Kogălniceanu, he drafted the law on secularization of monastic estates, as the only bishop in the Principalities to support Domnitor Alexandru Ioan Cuza in this endeavor. The following spring, he became Minister of Religious Affairs and Public Instruction in the Moldavian government. The presence of a bishop in the cabinet drew objections from Parliament, with the great boyars unwilling to accept the presence of a mere archimandrite in such a high position. Kogălniceanu responded by defending his right to serve as minister and carry out his mission of reorganizing the church and help the clergy. Nevertheless, Melchisedec resigned after a few days, wishing to avoid trouble for a cabinet that had won approval with much difficulty. However, he continued to back Cuza's modernization program as a historical necessity.

In 1864, following the consolidation of a single Orthodox church for the Principalities, he was placed in the new position of Bishop of the Lower Danube, in an acting capacity; the following year, through a decree signed by Domnitor Cuza, he took on the position on a permanent basis. His see was located at Ismail, where for the next fourteen years he organized the diocese and paid close attention to improving the seminary. In February 1868, Melchisedec and Ioan C. Cantacuzino were sent by Domnitor Carol I on a special mission to Saint Petersburg, to discuss the upgrading of Romania–Russia relations. They handed Tsar Alexander II a letter from Carol and asked to negotiate unresolved political matters—such as reducing the special protections of Russian subjects on Romanian soil. In a letter sent to the Domnitor earlier the same year, Otto von Bismarck, who had previously served as ambassador to Russia, expressed his confidence in the bishop's success. Indeed, he was well received by Russian officials, including the tsar, who kissed his hand out of respect. While there, Melchisedec also tried to persuade Alexander Gorchakov to mediate between his church and the Ecumenical Patriarchate, in order to resolve disputed over the appointment of Romanian bishops.

In 1878, after Ismail and the Budjak were ceded to the Russian Empire via the Treaty of Berlin, Melchisedec and his bishopric were moved to Galați. The following February, he was elected Bishop of Roman, remaining there until his death. At Roman, he transformed the diocesan garden into a genuine park, with flowers and fruit trees, fountains and shelters; and financed most renovations himself. He also persuaded the state to build a new, spacious seminary. In all three dioceses he led, Melchisedec imposed discipline on the clergy and hired assistants based on merit. He managed to persuade wealthy ktitors to finance village churches or help in other ways. Although busy with research, he found time for pastoral visits, dispensing valuable advice. He encouraged young people to study, giving them books and money; sent the most promising to Czernowitz or Kiev, and persuaded the Holy Synod to grant scholarships.

As a member of the Holy Synod, Melchisedec worked hard to draft numerous important proposals for laws and regulations, and was essentially its key member. Indeed, the entire modern organization of the Romanian church and its religious institutes is almost entirely the work of Melchisedec. A particular preoccupation, and the subject of several reports, was the obtaining of autocephaly. He belonged ex officio to the Romanian Senate. The Synod sent him to Bonn in 1875 in order to attend the Old Catholic Church conference, an early ecumenist gesture. During the Romanian War of Independence, which also involved Russia, Melchisedec donated an important sum of money to the government for equipping the army.

Melchisedec's prestige waned following the establishment of a Romanian Kingdom in 1881. Subjected to years of attacks by the press, he was excoriated for having supported Cuza's reforms and accused of having ties to Russia and the Russian Orthodox Church. The source of these intrigues appears to have been Roman Catholic circles displeased at his pamphlet directed against their church's alleged proselytism in Romania. Moreover, he had enemies within the Synod, including Partenie Clinceni and Ghenadie Petrescu, envious of his erudition and achievements. An especial political adversary was Dimitrie Sturdza, whom Melchisedec refused to support. In addition, Melchisedec had attracted the suspicions of Carol I, by then King of Romania and a Triple Alliance supporter. He was persuaded that the bishop was a Russophile, and hostile to his plans. Taken together, these factors prevented Melchisedec's election as head of the church, both in 1875 after the death of Nifon Rusailă; and particularly in 1886, following Calinic Miclescu's death. Melchisedec was nevertheless honored by the Russian establishment: in 1887, Russian monarch Alexander III, who referred to Melchisedec as "the most brilliant bishop of the Romanian kingdom", sent the latter greetings and an expensive egolpion (small icon worn by bishops as a necklace), in recognition of 45 years' service to church and country.

== Scholarly work and legacy ==
Elected a titular member of the Romanian Academy in 1870, he belonged to eight other scientific and cultural societies from Paris, Tarnovo, Kiev, Saint Petersburg, Athens and Constantinople. Among his admirers as a scholar were Bogdan Petriceicu Hasdeu, a contemporary and the younger Nicolae Iorga. His most important historical and philological work was Cronica Hușilor. His 1871 book on the Lipovans was the first ample study of this community in Romania and its surroundings; the work covered the Romanian Old Kingdom proper as well as neighboring Bukovina and Dobruja, then under Austrian and Ottoman administration, respectively. He analyzed its hierarchy, the differences in worship from the state church and the group's demographic profile. In all, he published over sixty works of history, theology and teaching during a period that saw a transition from the Romanian Cyrillic alphabet to the modern Latin alphabet. Melchisedec wrote mainly in the latter script, but preferred Cyrillic writing for religious books.

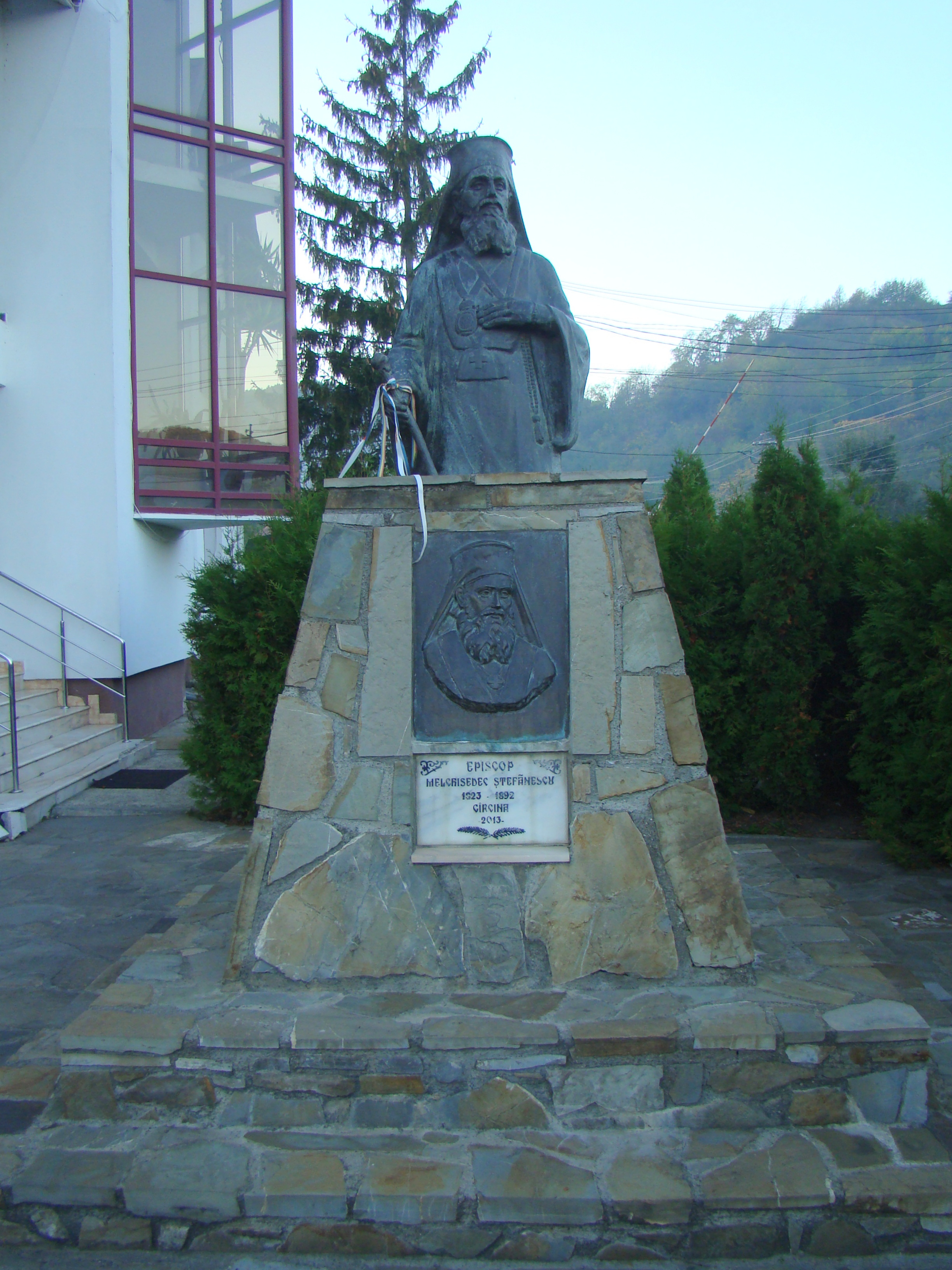
Monument dedicated to Ștefănescu in Gârcina

Melchisedec was active within the academy: he presented reviews of books by Moses Gaster, Gheorghe Asachi and others; displayed original Moldavian decrees written in Old Church Slavonic; and proposed the publication of a collection comprising 64 sermons by John Chrysostom that he had translated from German, in an edition by Karl Josef von Hefele. (The bishop knew seven foreign languages: French, German Russian, Ancient Greek, Latin, Slavonic and Hebrew.) He presented a report about the discovery, inside the Gospel Book of Humor Monastery, of a true portrait depicting Stephen the Great; as well as a series of Slavonic documents and sermons by Anthim the Iberian. Later, the historian Constantin C. Diculescu observed that Melchisedec and Hasdeu were the first Romanian historians who appreciated the true value of early Slavonic records.

He helped found the Romanian Academy Library by donating his personal library of 82 manuscripts and 2,511 books, as well as a collection of 114 coins, to the academy in his will. It was among the richest libraries in late 19th-century Romania, including books on history, literature, theology, political and social matters, pedagogy, economics, agriculture, science, medicine and art, as well as periodicals. Furthermore, the will left his fortune of 150,000 lei, a hundred beehives and two rows of houses near the cathedral to be administered by the Bishop of Roman. Every year, the income would help finance a recipient's theological studies at Kiev; among those who benefited from the scholarship were Ludovic Cosma, Ioan Țincoca, Vespasian Erbiceanu, Constantin Nazarie and Nicodim Munteanu. He also willed that a kindergarten for local children be established in one of his houses, as well as a school for church singers that would only admit orphans and provide them with free room and board.

The Melchisedec Foundation was established in 1892, the year of his death; its purpose is to carry out the provisions of his will, drafted three years previously. Located in the center of Roman, the entire site is listed as a historic monument by Romania's Ministry of Culture and Religious Affairs, as are several individual buildings: the 1849 house of Doctor Teodoru, which the bishop purchased in 1886; the 1911 church singers' school; the 1915 kindergarten; and the 1938 chapel; his nearby grave is also listed. In 1948, the new communist regime nationalized the foundation, which was revived following the Romanian Revolution.
