= Pietroșani, Teleorman =

Pietroșani
- Commune
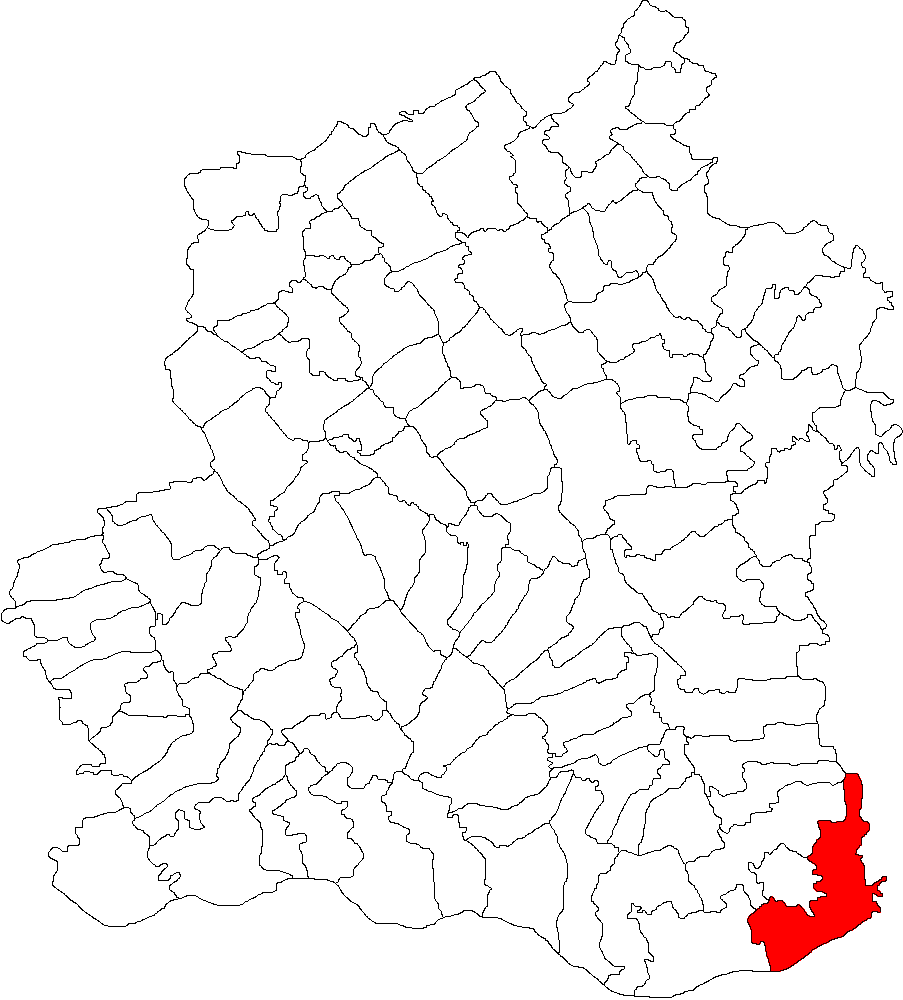
- Location in Teleorman County

- Location in Romania
- Coordinates: 43°43′N 25°38′E
- Country: Romania
- County: Teleorman
- Established: 1659
- Lowest elevation: 23 m (75 ft)
- Population (2021-12-01): 2,407
- Time zone: EET/EEST (UTC+2/+3)
- Vehicle reg.: TR
- Website: primariapietrosani.ro

Pietroșani is a commune in Teleorman County, Muntenia, Romania. It is composed of a single village, Pietroșani.

Located at the southeast extremity of the county, Pietroșani borders Giurgiu County. As a village, it dates to 1659; it was declared a commune in 1861.

Local features include ruins of the 1812 Holy Trinity Church, and a World War I monument from 1924.
