= Dimitrie Ghica =

Romanian politician

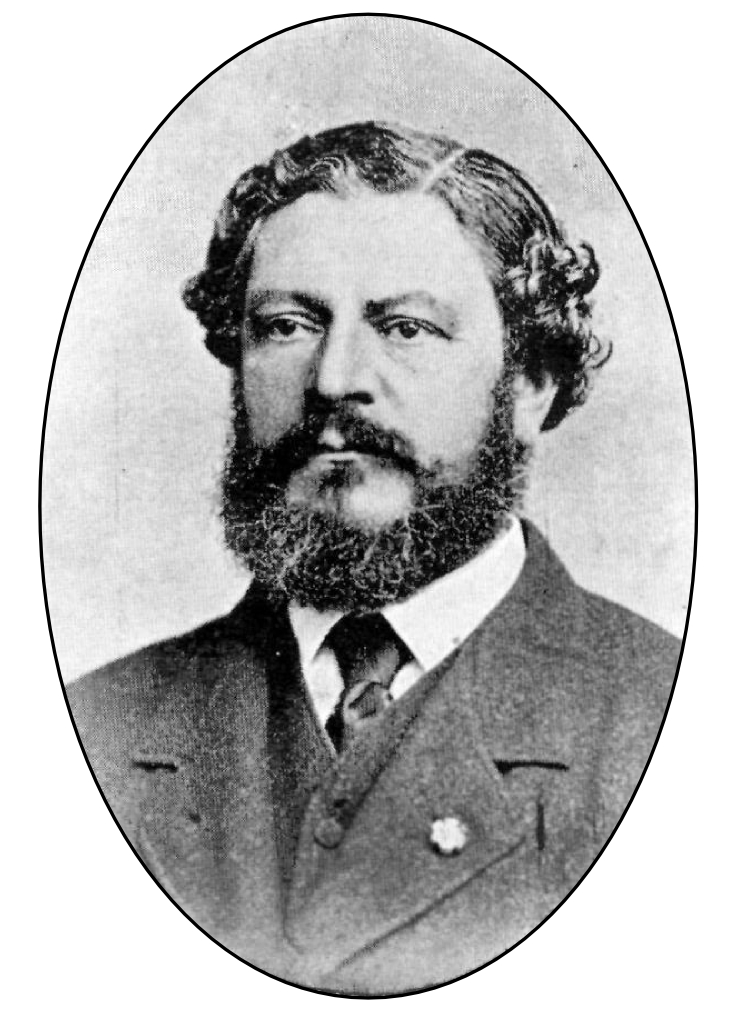

10th Prime Minister of Romania
- In office 16 November 1868 – 27 January 1870
- Monarch: Carol I
- Preceded by: Nicolae Golescu
- Succeeded by: Alexandru G. Golescu

Minister of Internal Affairs
- In office 11 February 1866 – 10 May 1866
- Prime Minister: Ion Ghica
- Preceded by: Nicolae Kretzulescu
- Succeeded by: Lascăr Catargiu
- In office 24 January 1870 – 27 January 1870
- Prime Minister: himself
- Preceded by: Mihail Kogălniceanu
- Succeeded by: Alexandru G. Golescu

Minister of Foreign Affairs
- In office 16 November 1868 – 27 November 1869
- Prime Minister: himself
- Preceded by: Nicolae Golescu
- Succeeded by: Nicolae Calimachi-Catargiu

President of the Chamber of Deputies
- In office 26 May 1871 – 17 February 1876
- Monarch: Carol I
- Preceded by: Nicolae Păcleanu
- Succeeded by: Constantin N. Brăiloiu

President of the Senate of Romania
- In office 17 November 1879 – 8 September 1888
- Monarch: Carol I
- Preceded by: Constantin Bosianu
- Succeeded by: Ion Emanoil Florescu

Personal details
- Born: May 31, 1816 Bucharest, Wallachia
- Died: February 15, 1897 (aged 80) Bucharest, Kingdom of Romania
- Resting place: Bellu Cemetery, Bucharest
- Party: Conservative Party
- Spouse: Charlotte Duport
- Children: 2
- Parents: Grigore IV Ghica (father); Maria Hangerly (mother)
- Relatives: Ghica family
- Occupation: Politician

Dimitrie Ghica or Ghika (Albanian: Gjika) (Romanian pronunciation: [diˈmitri.e ˈɡika]; 31 May 1816 – 15 February 1897) was a Romanian politician. A prominent member of the Conservative Party, he served as Prime Minister between 1868 and 1870.

Dimitrie Ghica was born in Bucharest into the Albanian Ghica family, as the son of the Wallachian Prince Grigore IV Ghica by his first wife, Maria Hangerly. He married Charlotte Duport, and they had two daughters, Maria and Iza. Ghica was a member of the Macedo-Romanian Cultural Society.

He died in Bucharest at the age of 80 and was buried in the city's Bellu Cemetery; his tomb was designed by architect Ion Mincu. A park in Sinaia and a street in Dorobanțu bear his name.
