= Socola Monastery =

Heritage site in Iași, Romania

Coordinates: 47.1288566°N 27.6135007°E

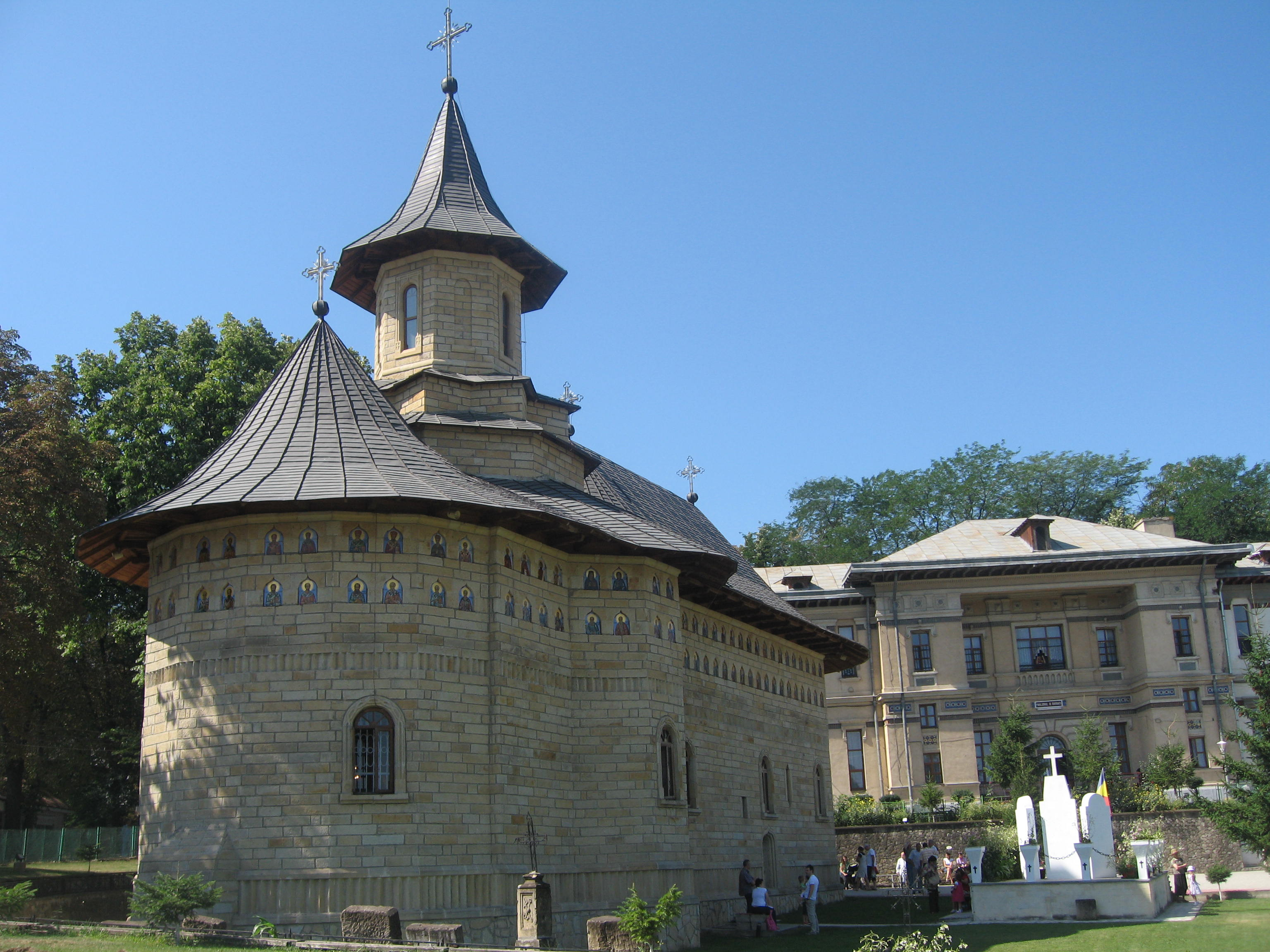
The Socola church

Socola Monastery or Schimbarea la Față ("Transfiguration") was a Romanian Orthodox establishment located in the eponymous quarter of southern Iaşi, Romania. Founded during Moldavia's existence as a state, it was erected and dedicated by Moldavian Prince Alexandru Lăpuşneanu in 1562, and originally functioned as nunnery. The establishment acquired a significant historical position in Romanian education during the early 19th century, when it functioned as a seminary and the first-ever institution to provide secondary training in the Romanian language.

The seminary ceased to exist later in the same century, and, in 1905, was replaced by a psychiatric hospital. The monastery continued to function until the communist period, when it became a parish church. It has afterward been functioning as a church serving the Socola Psychiatric University Hospital.

== History ==
Lăpușneanu ordered work to begin on the monastery building in 1551, to replace an older church, the work being completed in 1562. The dedication was made by the monarch, his wife Ruxandra and his daughter Soltana as ktitors, with Soltana also serving as the first head of what was then the Socola nunnery. The institution also housed a school, which offered training for both nuns and laywomen for the surrounding community. The name, which carries no meaning in Romanian, was probably borrowed from a Slavic source, from sokol, or "hawk" (allegedly in connection to the practice of falconry in its immediate vicinity).

The seminary was set up in 1803, during the reign of Phanariote Prince Alexander Mourousis, as the first secondary education institution to provide teaching in the vernacular (as opposed to Greek, Slavonic or other liturgical languages), and one of the first formal schools in the country. The decision behind this belonged to Moldavian Metropolitan Veniamin Costachi, whose "primary objective", according to American historian Keith Hitchins, "was to improve the training of the clergy" as part of a "master plan to modernize Moldavian education" and tone down "the influence of Greek and the Greek professors at the princely academy in Iași." In the same period, Moldavia, like the southern Danubian Principality of Wallachia, witnessed a revival of monastic activity. In order for the seminary to start functioning, the nuns were moved to Agapia Monastery, and the Agapia monks took their place.

Socola became the focus of a major education reform in 1814, under the administration of Prince Scarlat Callimachi and his adviser, Gheorghe Asachi. In 1820, as part of the same trend, it received among its teachers a group of Orthodox churchmen from Transylvania (at the time part of the Austrian Empire). The initiative on par with other such encouraged immigrations, officially adopted as measures for improving the quality of teaching. The institution, known in Neo-Latin as Seminaria Veniamina, gained in prestige and hosted celebrated educators such as Melchisedec of Roman, Neofit Scriban and Filaret Scriban. It was also the alma mater of Ion Creangă, later known as a major contributor to the literature of Romania.

The school was occupied by Russian forces during the Russo-Turkish War of 1828–1829, and, a few months later, accidentally burned down. The institution was however restored, and it was here that, in 1859, the Moldo-Wallachian union was celebrated by the newly elected Domnitor Alexandru Ioan Cuza.

In 1886, five years after the proclamation of a Kingdom of Romania, the monastery was subject to restructuring: the seminary was moved uptown, into the previous residence of former Prince Mihail Sturdza, and a reputedly miraculous icon of the Virgin Mary was moved into the Metropolitan Cathedral. Six years later, Socola came to the interest of physician Alexandru Şuţu, who sought to generate the practice of modern psychiatry in Romania, on the basis of Western European models. He therefore proposed the building of a psychiatric hospital in close proximity to the monastery, a project approved by Parliament, but effected only in 1905 (due to poor allocation of funds). It was located over the former seminary, and was later assigned as a college hospital to the University of Iaşi (later University of Medicine and Pharmacy).

Socola ceased to function as a monastery during the communist period, when it became a regular parish church for the neighborhood. this situation changed again after the Romanian Revolution of 1989, when it dedicated itself primarily to servicing the religious needs of patients at the affiliate hospital.

== Features ==
In its earliest state, the Socola Monastery church, built entirely in stone, was only as long as its present-day nave, featuring a single tower and narrow windows placed high on each side wall. The design closely followed a classical pattern established under the late 14th century rule of Stephen the Great. At some point early in the 17th century, the structure was enriched with two apses and an open porch (in the style of Dragomirna Monastery). Under the administration of Metropolitan Costachi, the porch was extended to become a narthex accommodating a bell tower (built in brick), while the existing stone tower was redesigned to resemble the new one, and the windows covered and replaced with ten new and larger ones. Alongside the new tower design (which echoed the onion dome shape), the era also added a roof without eaves.

Unlike other Romanian Orthodox churches, Socola lacks murals, and is decorated instead with framed paintings and the usual iconostasis (both made by the same anonymous painter in 1827). A set of murals, produced early in the 20th century, were painted over in time, after it was judged that they lacked artistic or historical importance. The church furniture is in carved oak, and forms part of a larger collection (part of which was donated by Socola to the Miclăuşeni Monastery).

The Socola Monastery houses a cemetery which golds the remains of church officials, former seminary teachers, and heroes of the World War II Romanian campaign. The building houses objects of religious patrimony, such as 19th century books in Romanian and Greek (printed at Neamţ Monastery or in Buda).
