= Anton Berindei =

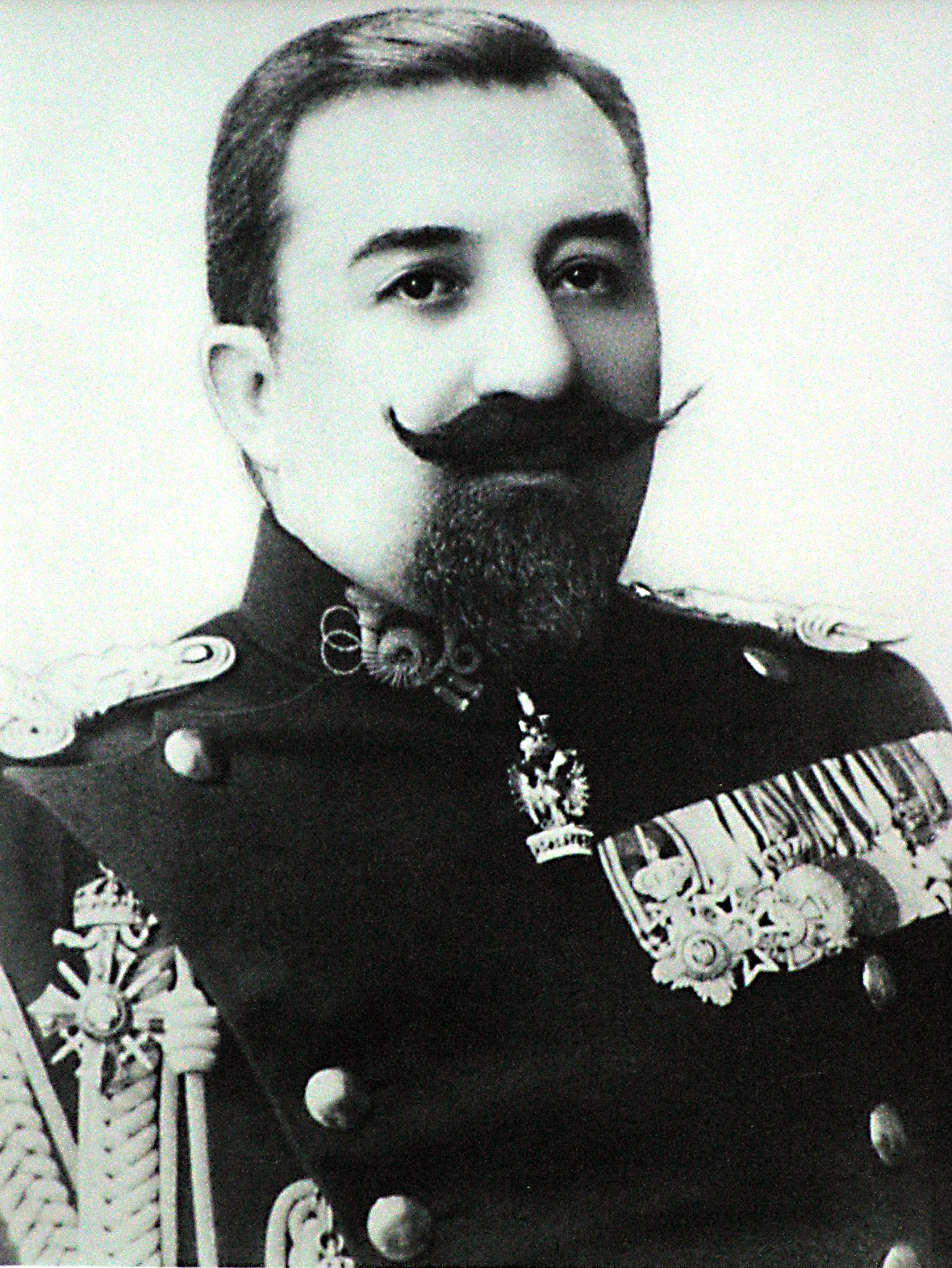
- Born: 6 January 1838; Roșiorii de Vede, Wallachia
- Died: 31 October 1899 (aged 61); Bucharest, Kingdom of Romania
- Occupation: military engineering

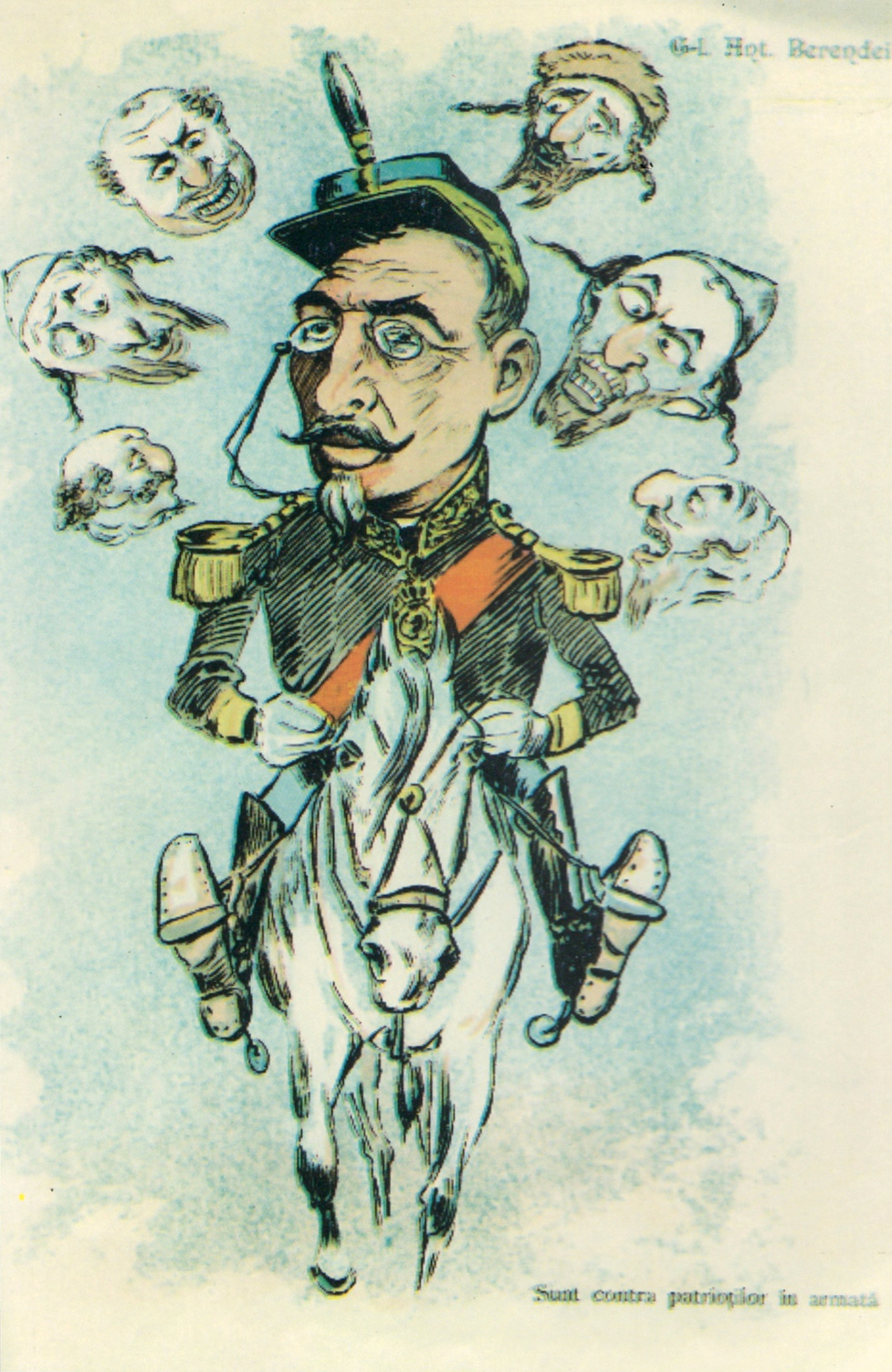
Caricature by Nicolae Petrescu Găină

Anton Berindei (6 January 1838–31 October 1899) was a Romanian brigadier general and division commander.

Born in Roșiorii de Vede, he was descended from boyar families on both sides; his mother was born Isvoranu. He attended the École d'application de l'artillerie et du génie in Metz, graduating in 1860. That year, he became a second lieutenant in the Romanian Land Forces, rising to captain in the military engineers' general staff (1865), major (1869), lieutenant colonel and adjutant (1872-1875) and colonel (1878). Within the War Ministry, Berindei was a general secretary from 1880 to 1882. From 1882 to 1885, he commanded a military engineers' regiment. From 1885 to 1888, he was a brigadier general and division commander. In 1888, he became inspector general of military engineers, heading construction work on the fortifications of Bucharest. In 1894, he became a division general, commanding an army corps. From December 1896 to April 1899, he served as War Minister in the cabinet of Petre S. Aurelian.

Berindei married Maria (1846-1927), the daughter of Constantin N. Brăiloiu. The couple had four sons and three daughters. One of their children, Grigore, became an infantry officer and was among the founders of Cercetașii României.
