= Gârcina =

- Commune
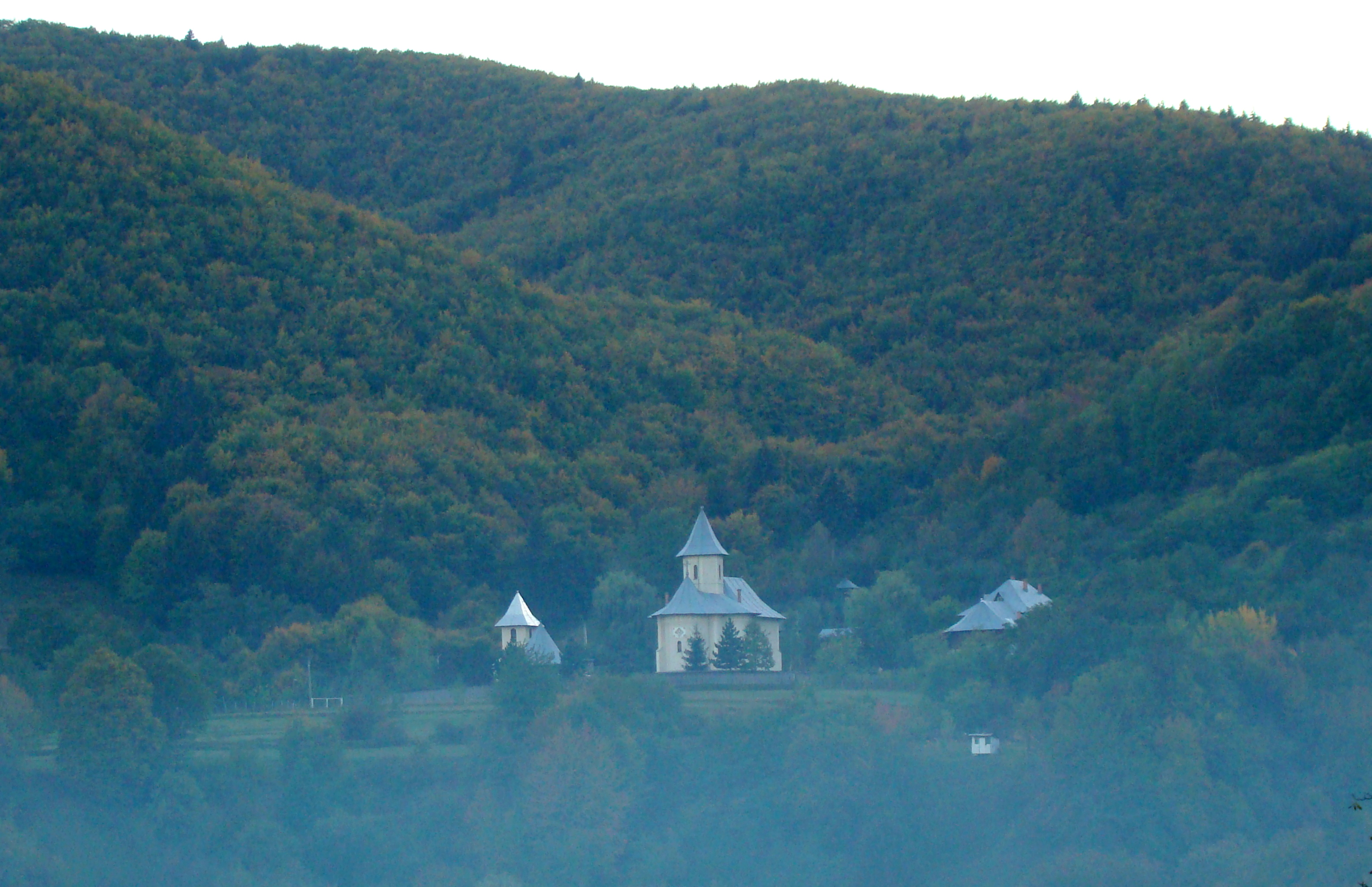
- Peștera Monastery in Gârcina

- Location in Neamț County

- Location in Romania
- Coordinates: 46°59′N 26°18′E
- Country: Romania
- County: Neamț

Government
  - Mayor (2024–2028): Gavril Mihai Gontaru (PSD)
- Area: 26.83 km^{2} (10.36 sq mi)
- Elevation: 410 m (1,350 ft)
- Population (2021-12-01): 4,889
  - Density: 182.2/km^{2} (472.0/sq mi)
- Time zone: UTC+02:00 (EET)
  - Summer (DST): UTC+03:00 (EEST)
- Postal code: 617200
- Area code: +(40) 233
- Vehicle reg.: NT
- Website: www.primariagarcina.ro

Gârcina is a commune in Neamț County, Western Moldavia, Romania. It is composed of three villages: Almaș, Cuejdiu, and Gârcina.

Historical population
Year	Pop.	±%
1992	4,257	—
2002	4,414	+3.7%
2011	4,336	−1.8%
2021	4,889	+12.8%
Source: Census data

== Natives ==
- Melchisedec Ștefănescu (1823 – 1892), historian and bishop of the Romanian Orthodox Church
