= Nicolae Ionescu =

Romanian politician, jurist and publicist

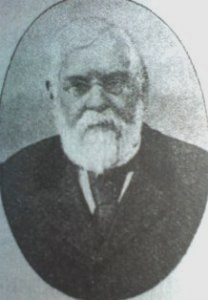
Nicolae Ionescu

Nicolae Ionescu (1820 in Bradu, Neamț County – January 24, 1905 in Bradu) was a Romanian politician, jurist and publicist, brother of the agronomist Ion Ionescu de la Brad. He was leader of the Free and Independent Faction, serving several terms in Chamber and Senate, most often as a representative of Roman County, and was helped to establish several liberal coalitions in the 1860s and '70s. His career peaked just before the Romanian War of Independence, when he was Minister of Foreign Affairs in the cabinet of Ion Brătianu. Ionescu ended his career in politics with the National Liberal Party. A professor of world history and a rector of Iași University, he was also one of the founding members of the Romanian Academy.
