= Filaret Scriban =

Moldavian and Romanian theologian

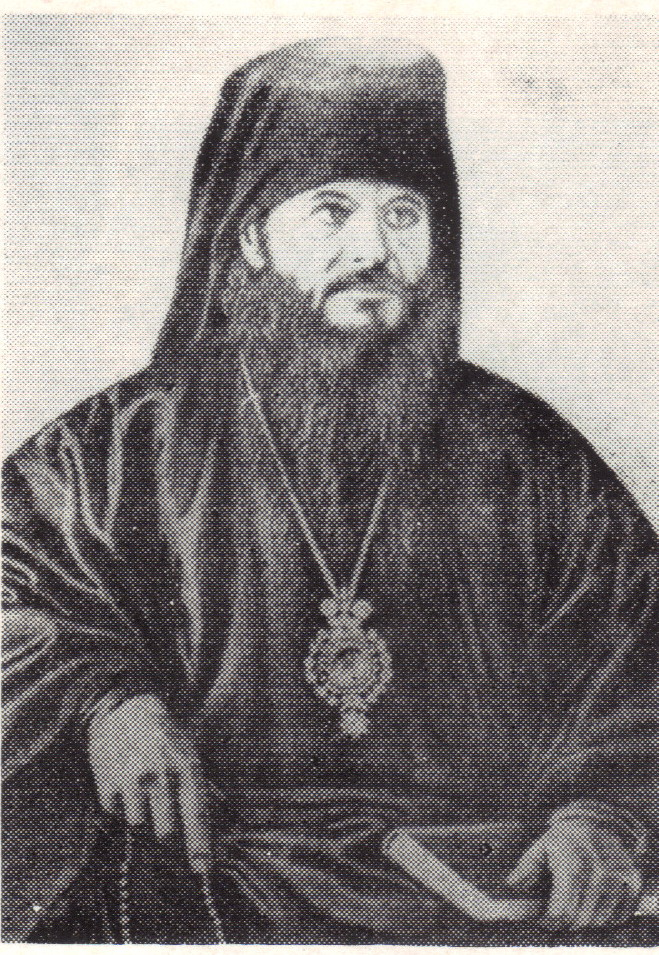
Filaret Scriban

Filaret Scriban (Romanian pronunciation: [filaˈret skriˈban]; born Vasile Scriban [vaˈsile]; 1811–March 23, 1873) was a Moldavian and Romanian theologian within the Romanian Orthodox Church.

Born in Burdujeni, Botoșani County, then a village near Suceava, his father was a priest. Leaving for Iași, the capital of Moldavia, he studied at the Vasilian College and at Academia Mihăileană between 1830 and 1837. Meanwhile, between 1834 and 1837, he taught at the normal school associated with Trei Ierarhi Monastery and was a part-time teacher at Academia Mihăileană from 1837 to 1839. He was sent to study at Kiev Theological Academy, where he remained from 1839 to 1842 and obtained a master's degree in theology. He entered Kiev Pechersk Lavra, taking the name Filaret, and was ordained a hieromonk in 1842. From that time until 1860, he taught at the Socola Monastery, eventually becoming rector, as well as abbot of the monastery. He attained the rank of archimandrite in 1843, and was styled titular bishop of Stavropoleos in 1852. In the 1850s, he actively promoted the Union of the Principalities, and was a member of the ad hoc Divan in 1857. When the University of Iași opened in 1860, he taught at the new theology faculty from that time until 1863. He served as the university's rector from 1861 to 1862. Following his retirement from teaching, he lived at Socola Monastery. Beginning in 1865, together with his brother Neofit, he was at the forefront of the campaign to obtain autocephaly for his church from the Patriarch of Constantinople. He was the ktitor of several churches in Burdujeni, and was a member of the Romanian Senate from 1867 to 1869. He authored a number of textbooks, both for secular and theological education, as well as poems and speeches.
