= Constantin Bosianu =

Prime Minister of Romania (1815–1882)

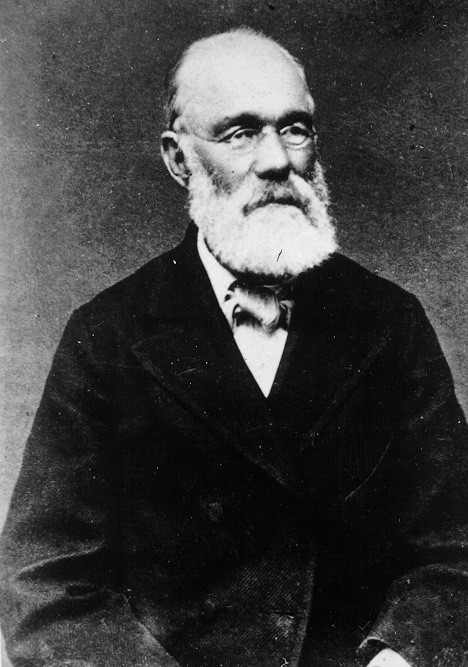

4th Prime Minister of Romania
- In office 26 January 1865 – 14 June 1865
- Monarch: Alexandru Ioan Cuza
- Preceded by: Mihail Kogălniceanu
- Succeeded by: Nicolae Kretzulescu

6th President of the Senate of Romania
- In office 29 May 1879 – 15 November 1879
- Monarch: Carol I
- Preceded by: Calinic Miclescu
- Succeeded by: Dimitrie Ghica

Mayor of Bucharest (acting)
- In office December 1878 – December 1878
- Preceded by: C. A. Rosetti
- Succeeded by: Dimitrie Cariagdi

Personal details
- Born: 10 February 1815 Bucharest, Wallachia
- Died: 21 March 1882 (aged 67) Bucharest, Kingdom of Romania
- Parent: Andrei Bosianu (father)
- Education: Saint Sava High School
- Alma mater: University of Paris
- Occupation: Jurist, academic, politician
- Employers: University of Bucharest; High Court of Cassation and Justice

Constantin Bosianu (Romanian pronunciation: [konstanˈtin bosiˈanu]; 10 February 1815 – 21 March 1882) was a Romanian jurist and politician, an honorary member of the Romanian Academy, and Prime Minister of Romania from 26 January to 14 June 1865. He was the first dean of the University of Bucharest's Faculty of Law.

He was an acting MP at the same time as he served as Dean of the Ilfov County Bar (1871–1873). By the end of his life, Bosianu served as an acting Mayor of Bucharest for two weeks in December 1878, and between 29 May and 15 November 1879, Constantin Bosianu was elected the President of the Senate.

== Biography ==
He was born in Bucharest, the son of paharnic Andrei Bosianu, and studied at the prestigious school of Saint Sava. He worked in government as the head of the public control chamber of the Department of Finance. After receiving a state scholarship, he continued his studies in Antwerp and Paris, where in 1844 he received a degree in literature at the Sorbonne and a PhD in law in 1851.

Returning to his homeland, he became a professor of Roman Law, then a professor of accounting at the Central School of Agriculture and director of the Department of Justice. As a member of the Electoral Assembly of Wallachia, on 24 January 1859 he voted to elect Alexandru Ioan Cuza to the throne of Romania. Later he was appointed a judge of the Supreme Court.

In 1864, he became vice-president of the State Council of the United Principalities of Moldavia and Wallachia.

Bosianu died in Bucharest on 21 March 1882, at the age of 67. A street in Sector 4 of Bucharest bears his name.

The Bosianu House, the jurist's former residence, is designated as a historical monument. Built in neo-Gothic style between 1853 and 1859, it also housed several secret meetings in the lead-up to the unification of Moldavia and Wallachia, and even domnitor Cuza himself is known to have taken shelter there.
