= Constantin N. Brăiloiu =

Wallachian and Romanian politician

Constantin N. Brăiloiu (October 3, 1809 or 1810–June 19, 1889) was a Wallachian and Romanian politician.

Born in Craiova, he was the oldest child of Nicolae Brăiloiu and his wife, Zoe or Zinca (née Vlădăianu or Vlădoianu). He had two brothers, one of whom died early, and three sisters. His father, born to Iordache Zătreanu and Marghioala Brăiloiu, had been adopted by logothete Dumitrache Brăiloiu around 1788. Brăiloiu, Vlădăianu and Zătreanu are all old boyar families from the Oltenia region. Constantin was married twice: to Coralia Ghica-Brigadier, and then to Ecaterina (Catinca) Hagi Moscu. He had three sons and three daughters by the latter. One of the daughters, Maria, married Anton Berindei. A son, Nicolae, was the father of Constantin Brăiloiu.

Starting in 1822, Brăiloiu went to school abroad, in Sibiu, Geneva and Paris. By 1832, he was a supplementary bureaucrat at the state secretariat. He was also prosecutor at the criminal section of the judicial court (1837), at the court of appeals (1841, 1842) and a member of the criminal appeals court (1853). In 1855, he returned to the secretariat as assessor. The following year, he was named to the committee handling the freeing of the Roma slaves. Subsequently, he was a member of the high court of justice and, in 1859, president of the commercial court.

In 1838 and from 1841 to 1843, Brăiloiu taught criminal law, civil and commercial judicial procedure at Saint Sava College. Following the Wallachian Revolution of 1848, he became director of the country's school administration. Meanwhile, he steadily rose in the ranks of the nobility: pitar (1841), serdar (1842), paharnic (1847), clucer (1850) and aga (1855)—in other words, from ninth in the hierarchy to fifth.

From 1859, at the time of the Union of the Principalities, Brăiloiu entered politics. He was an incisive journalist, as attested by his contributions to Conservatorul Progresist, Unirea, Desbaterile and Timpul. He was also among the most active conservative elected officials of the time. In 1859, he was sent as a Gorj County deputy to Wallachia's elective assembly, joining the legislative assembly in 1861. From 1859 to 1861, he sat on the central committee in Focșani, coordinating policy with his counterparts from Moldavia. He was state secretary from 1858 to 1859, and was twice Justice Minister under Barbu Catargiu. His first stint in this office was in April–May 1861, covering Wallachia alone; then, from January to June 1862, he served in a unified government for all Romania. Between 1862 and 1864, he took part in the debates of the legislative assembly. In 1866, the electors of Târgu Jiu sent Brăiloiu to represent them in the constituent assembly. He was in the Assembly of Deputies in 1873-1874 and re-elected for Gorj in 1875. From February to May 1876, he was Assembly President. Additionally, he was Senator for Dolj County in 1866 and 1868, and for Craiova in 1869.

Brăiloiu died in Bucharest in 1889 and was buried at Bellu cemetery. Catinca followed in 1904.
