= Gheorghe Chițu =

Romanian lawyer, politician and writer (1828–1897)

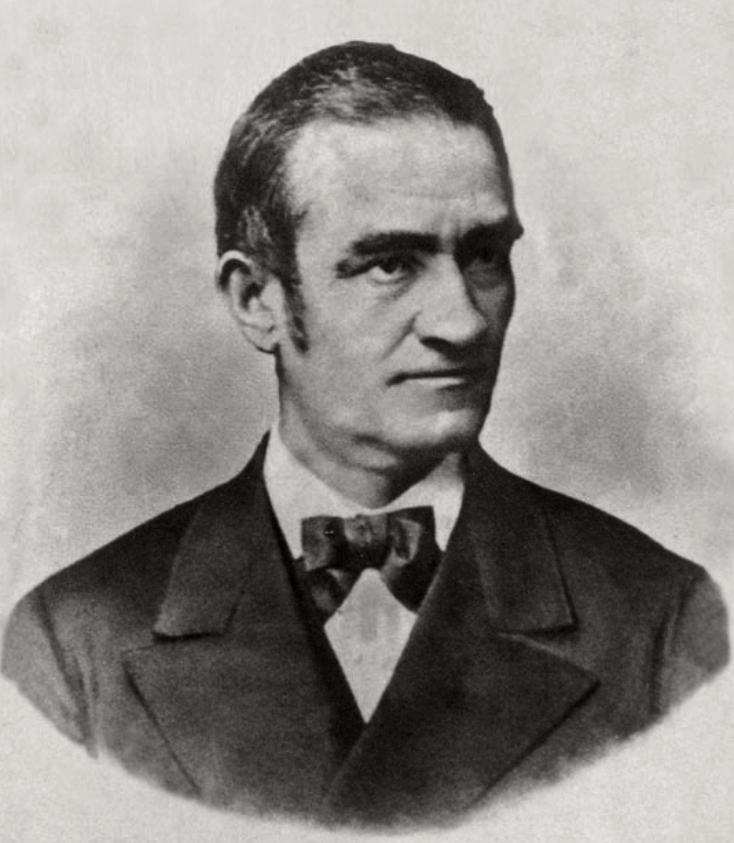
- Photograph of Gheorghe Chițu

Religious Affairs and Education Minister of Romania
- In office 27 April 1876 – 31 October 1878
- Preceded by: Alexandru Orăscu
- Succeeded by: Ion Brătianu
- In office 23 June 1884 – 1 February 1885
- Preceded by: Petre S. Aurelian
- Succeeded by: Dimitrie Sturdza

Finance Minister of Romania
- In office December 1881 – January 1882
- Preceded by: Ion Brătianu
- Succeeded by: Gheorghe Lecca

Justice Minister of Romania
- In office January – August 1882
- Preceded by: Eugeniu Stătescu
- Succeeded by: Eugeniu Stătescu
- In office September – November 1883
- Preceded by: Eugeniu Stătescu
- Succeeded by: Nicolae Voinov

Interior Minister of Romania
- In office August 1882 – June 1884
- Preceded by: Ion Brătianu
- Succeeded by: Ion Brătianu

Mayor of Craiova
- In office 1863–1866
- Preceded by: Office established
- Succeeded by: N. C. Otetelișanu

Personal details
- Born: 24 August 1828 Oboga or Craiova, Wallachia
- Died: 27 October 1897 (aged 69) Mirila, Kingdom of Romania
- Party: Craiova Revolutionaries' Club (1848); National Party (1850s); Free and Independent Faction (1870); National Liberal Party (1875–1897)
- Spouse: Alecsandrina "Luța" Sefendache
- Relations: Aurelia Kitzu Arimondi (niece)
- Children: 4
- Occupation: Lawyer, journalist, scholar, publisher, poet

Gheorghe Chițu (first name also George or Giorgiu, last name also Chițiu, Chitzu, Kițu or Kitzu; Francized as Georges Kitzou or Quitzou; 24 August 1828 – 27 October 1897) was a Wallachian, later Romanian lawyer, politician, and man of letters, whose activities were mostly centered on the region of Oltenia. The recipient of a classical education, which compensated for his middle-class background and allowed him to study at the University of Vienna, he was also deeply involved in the Wallachian Revolution of 1848 as an early adherent of "Red" liberalism. He became a propagandist and organizer for the National Party, founding Vocea Oltului gazette in 1857. Chițu was confirmed as the United Principalities' first-ever elected provincial mayor, at Craiova, where he also worked as a lawyer and prosecutor. His political radicalism and his participation in the Romanian Freemasonry were nuanced by his defense of the Romanian Orthodox Church against a reduction of its assets.

Serving for almost twenty years in the Assembly of Deputies and Senate, Chițu criticized Westernization and championed local political models, including Oltenia's Tudor Vladimirescu. His parallel work as a publicist and publisher resulted in noted collaborations with Constantin D. Aricescu, Bogdan Petriceicu Hasdeu, and Theodor Aman; it also contributed to his being inducted into the Romanian Academy in 1879. He is additionally remembered for his interest in the artistic reconstruction of two historical figures, Vladimirescu and Stephen the Great. Chițu fluctuated between the "Reds" and the Free and Independent Faction, being drawn into conspiratorial politics against Carol of Hohenzollern. With Alexandru Candiano-Popescu and Eugeniu Carada, he had a visible contribution to a failed insurrection in 1870. Some five years later, he joined Ion C. Brătianu in setting up the National Liberal Party, which seized power by peaceful means. He served Brătianu as an Education Minister, playing a part in the modernization and standardization of teaching, but also embracing controversy with his political favoritism.

Successively in the 1880s, in the newly proclaimed Kingdom of Romania, Chițu handled Finance, Justice, Internal Affairs, and again Education, earning respect for his indifference to graft and his hard stance on administrative incompetence. He also personally handled the repression of anti-Carol riots in 1884, after which, like Brătianu, he established a steady cooperation with conservatives grouped as the Junimea society. A lifelong alcoholic, Chițu reportedly had all his teeth extracted while inebriated, and was consequently struck by paralysis. He was left incapacitated and impoverished during the final decade of his life, which he spent on his only remaining estate, at Mirila. He had by then been shunned by the Craiova voters, as well as by his former friend Hasdeu, and had lost prospects of returning to the legal profession, ending his career as a representative of rural constituencies in Olt County. Oltenians honored his memory by assigning his name to Craiova's Commercial School. Several works of public arts were commissioned, including a since-lost bust by a young Constantin Brâncuși.

== Biography ==
=== Youth ===
Chițu was a native of Oltenia region, in what was then western Wallachia. Sources diverge as to the exact location of his birth: while official biographies have Oboga, in Romanați County (presently Olt County), his friend and son-in-law Constantin M. Ciocazan reported Craiova, the capital of Dolj County and of Oltenia itself. According to one detailed account, the family was in Oboga to escape from the ravages of a Russo-Turkish War. Craiova historian D. E. Petrescu, who relays a story ultimately originating with Grigore Tocilescu, provides more context:

One can find no better proof that men may rise from the lowest to the highest station in life, provided they display intelligence, willpower, and capacity for work. [...] He was born in 1828, in a bullock cart on the outskirts of Oboga village (just north of Balș), and was baptized by his father, for lack of a priest.

Throughout the 19th century, Craiova's burgeoning commercial and civic elite was largely of South Slavic, Greek, or Aromanian background. The Chițus were immigrants from Macedonia; records suggest that they came to Oltenia after a stay in Transylvania, moving to Teslui and finally Craiova before Gheorghe's birth. Researcher Anastase Hâciu traces them to the Aromanian clans of Neveska, even though Chițu's political adversaries claimed that the family was Bulgarian in origin. The family surname is probably derived from the female name Paraschița, reflecting an onomastic tradition shared between Romanians and Bulgarians (see Paraskeva of the Balkans). Chițu's father, known as Theodor or Todoru (1786–1866), was a waistcoat merchant with some knowledge of Greek literature. His shop was located on Copertarilor Street in Craiova, where Gheorghe would also own a townhouse in Podișor area. He was possibly the eldest of three sons born to Theodor and Florica (Floarea), who also had two daughters; Marin Chițu, credited by various biographers as Gheorghe's elder, was more likely born in 1830. He was known locally as a dealer of art and bric-à-brac. Another one of Theodor's sons, Petre, had a controversial career as a lawyer in Oltenia, and was additionally noted for his cultural Italophilia, including his friendship with sculptor Ettore Ferrari. Petre is thus recognized for his translation of Alessandro Manzoni's historical novel, The Betrothed.

Young Gheorghe attended primary school in Craiova, after which he began his studies at Ioan Maiorescu's lyceum (the ancestor of Carol I National College) in that same city. It was at this stage that he debuted as a poet, with a French-language ode to the reigning Wallachian Prince, Alexandru II Ghica. He had a hard time making ends meet, and had to support himself by tutoring less competent students, including a young Carada. As a protégé of Prince Gheorghe Bibescu, Chițu was finally sent to continue his studies at Saint Sava College in Bucharest. Upon graduation, between 1847 and 1848, Saint Sava employed him as part of its staff; he taught classical languages. Granted a "modest scholarship" to study abroad, Chițu subsequently entered the University of Vienna law school. As noted by researcher George Mil. Demetrescu, he attended the classes and had a qualification certificate, but never took an actual graduation diploma. An active supporter of the Wallachian Revolution of 1848, Chițu joined a Revolutionaries' Club, formed around his former teacher Maiorescu. He was named Revolutionary Commissioner and director of propaganda for Oltenia, helping to raise soldiers for Gheorghe Magheru's National Guard. He wrote articles for Naționalul newspaper and may also be the author of two revolutionary manifestos that are also attributed to Maiorescu and Emanoil Quinezu.

On 18 July 1850, Chițu published in Vestitorul Românesc newspaper a piece announcing the creation of a National Theater Craiova, in its first incarnation. While still residing in the Austrian Empire, he took courses in Slavistics under Franz Miklosich and printed his own "distinctly religious and patriotic" book, Oracolul anului 1851 ("An Oracle for the Year 1851"). He greatly enjoyed his studies, and was congratulated by his professors; he also kept contact with Craiova's schoolteachers, offering to send them scientific literature. Though he preferred Vienna after hearing of the anti-revolutionary repression in his native country, he was still persecuted in exile by Prince Schwarzenberg's government; Oracolul was read as urging for the liberation of all Romanians, including those in lands governed by Austria, resulting in Chițu being briefly detained as a political suspect during August 1851. In one of his letters from the period, he recorded rumors that Wallachia and Moldavia were destined to be fused into a single Romanian state, as a project of the great powers, though he feared that the end result would be full-on exploitation by foreign capitalists.

By May 1851, Chițu had completed a play, which he hoped to see staged by the Craiova theater, and which he also presented for review to his Moldavian peer, Vasile Alecsandri. After attending a Vienna concert by Ludwig Wiest, which included renditions of Romanian folklore, he was inspired to write a sonnet, published in 1853. According to bibliophile Avram Vasculescu, it is one of the finest by a Romanian, while Ciocazan calls it "splendid"; it is in any case one of the first ever in the context of Romanian literature, alongside other samples by Radu Ionescu. At home, the revolutionary cell had been inactive under the repressive regime of Barbu Dimitrie Știrbei, but was revived by Chițu, Quinezu and Elefterie Cornetti in 1853, at the height of the Crimean War. In December of that year, he went public with his enduring admiration for Magheru (who had been banished from Wallachia following the 1848 events), writing the poem Essilatul ("The Exile"), written from Magheru's perspective; it concluded with the lines:

Patria nu este pe aqueste terra,
Ea pe toți ne-așteaptă în cereasca sferă,
Queea que aicea Patria numimŭ —
E gasda de noapte unde odihnimŭ.

Translation:

Our home is not on this ground that's here,
But rather above us, in the heavens' sphere,
What we call a homeland underneath that light —
Is but the resting-stop, a host for one long night.

=== Nationalist campaigner and Craiova mayor ===
Chițu practiced law in Craiova and until 1860 he edited Vocea Oltului gazette, which he founded upon his return from Austria in April 1857. "One of the oldest political newspapers to appear in Craiova", it became a mouthpiece for the National Party, advocating for the unification of Wallachia and Moldavia—he had originally wanted to call his paper România, which was the proposed name for the desired polity, but was prevented from doing so by the government censors. Ahead of the legislative election in 1857, he published an editorial equating union with social progress, and identifying its opponents exclusively with "foreigners". Another article, published on 2 July, raised alarm about the irresponsibility of separatist campaigners. During those months, Chițu organized the Craiova Election Committee as Oltenia's strongest liberal club, wherein he served alongside Quinezu and Barbu Bălcescu. On 26 April of that year, Vocea Oltului put out a unionist platform that was later followed by all of Oltenia's liberal sections. Chițu had an additional involvement in the January 1859 election, which resulted in Alexandru Ioan Cuza's recognition as Domnitor of both countries. In February 1860, Vocea Oltului welcomed the victor as "a man respected, adored, venerated by all of Romania [sic] and Moldavia".

Historian Nicolae Iorga suggests that Vocea Oltului was the first glimpse of a "literary movement" in Craiova—but also that its cultural efforts were eventually lost to "politicking". Entering the magistracy under the resulting United Principalities, in 1862 Chițu himself became president of the Dolj County tribunal and a prosecutor at the Craiova appeals court. He resigned in 1867 in order to resume work as a lawyer, presiding as dean of the city's bar association from 1864 to 1876. A widower from his first marriage to a woman named Ioana (also known as Anica), Chițu wed Alecsandrina "Luța" Sefendache (or Ștefandache) on 28 August 1858. This made him the posthumous son-in-law of Pitar Ioan Sefendache, from whom he inherited half of Vânjuleț estate. From this marriage, the young lawyer had a son, Alexandru—born in August 1861, and a daughter, Elena—born in July 1863; the couple's two other sons, Emilian and Horațiu, both died as toddlers (in 1866 and 1871, respectively).

Still an affiliate of the liberal clubs (the "Reds"), Chițu debuted in politics as the mayor of Craiova in 1863—the first ever mayor to be elected by Wallachian citizens under the law on urban communes. He was reconfirmed in 1865, and served until 1866, when he was replaced by N. C. Otetelișanu. In this position, he organized the first-ever election of a kehilla for the Sephardi Jews of Craiova (see History of the Jews in Romania), which was won by Haschiel Cohen. His tenure also came with the inauguration of a modern fire department, replacing the older rattle watch (roată) in October 1865.

In parallel, Chițu was also pitted against Domnitor Cuza's cherished policy of confiscating monastery land. As mayor, and subsequently as lawyer, he defended the estate of Madona Dudu Church, eventually winning the case with a favorable verdict at the Court of Cassation. He took no retainer for this case, noting that Madona Dudu had a mission to help the needy; his friends circulated a story according to which Chițu had refused payment for his services in obtaining reparations for a destitute widow and her son. Chițu also returned to cultural activities—as a member of the Dolj Council, he contributed to the establishment of the People's School of Arts and Crafts in Craiova (opened in 1870). Meanwhile, in early 1865, he and Anastase Stolojan were giving public lectures in Craiova; his essays on ethnography and the Romanian lexis (specifically Latin etymology and the Christian vocabulary) appeared in Bogdan Petriceicu Hasdeu's review, Columna luĭ Traianŭ.

Following the "monstrous coalition" coup, which toppled Cuza in February 1866, Chițu supported the notion of having a foreign prince on the throne. As Mayor, he greeted the newly selected Carol of Hohenzollern, who was passing through Craiova on his way to Bucharest. Between 1867 and 1888, he was elected to multiple terms as Deputy and Senator, representing Craiova. His first contributions there included a critique of excessive Westernization, which took as its starting point the observation that the Principalities' government newspaper, Monitorul Oficial, still ran an edition in French. In his interpellations, Chițu expressed his consternation that Romanians felt a need to report to the West on their country's inner workings. During the race of race of March 1869, which resulted in an electoral sweep for the conservatives (or "Whites"), Chițu had the distinction of being one of only ten "Reds" to win seats—and one of three liberals representing Dolj's 3rd College.

During his mandate, Chițu came to espouse the most optimistic version of Romanian nationalism, which discussed the possibility of forming a "Greater Romania" by somehow joining the Principalities with Transylvania—and with other Romanian-inhabited regions of Austria-Hungary. In December 1868, he supported the allocation of state funds for the explicitly nationalist press, noting that the "Romanian renaissance" was already seen as a threat in foreign circles; he voted in favor of organizing the Romanian Land Forces, noting that they would one day serve to liberate "our Romanian brethren." In that context, he spoke of the Hungarian partition as a "barbaric element" that "presses down on our Romanian brethren". Chițu also joined his voice to the multiparty group espousing economic antisemitism. Describing the "Jewish blight" as less prevalent in his native Oltenia, he criticized his more radical colleagues who proposed a new wave of discriminatory laws; he argued instead that decentralization was the solution, since it allowed mayors to block the settlement of any Jewish "vagabond" coming within range of their power.

=== 1870 conspiracy ===
In February 1870, Chițu followed C. A. Rosetti and Anton Arion's lead in resigning from the Assembly of Deputies; seven other deputies followed suit. Theirs was a protest against Domnitor Carol, who had disregarded parliamentary consensus in appointing Alexandru G. Golescu as Prime Minister. In confronting the "White" deputy Vasile Boerescu, who had called the walk-out a performative comedy, Chițu responded: "Mr Borescu has acted in both the comedy and the drama, and one is afraid a tragedy is to follow". According to political scientist Silvia Marton, during the election of May 1870 Chițu rallied with the Free and Independent Faction, and was arguing in favor of parliamentary sovereignty. Chițu had also joined the Romanian Freemasonry, in obedience to the Grand Orient de France (Memphis Rite). On 29 May 1870, he was a Worshipul Master of Unirea Lodge in Craiova, which had been created earlier that year.

As part of the "Red" liberal caucus during that legislature, Chițu tried to resist the Germanophile policies favored by Carol. Unlike other deputies, he refused to specifically endorse the Second French Empire in the ongoing Franco-Prussian War, prioritizing the national interest, which called for an explicit neutrality. However, in June 1870, he began agitating for Romania to exit its "passive and humiliated state", to emerge as a "unified, strong and great" country. During August, he reportedly joined Carada, Stolojan and Ion Theodorian in conspiring against Carol's regime by establishing a new revolutionary cell in Craiova. Carada postponed the action in agreement with other "Red" militants; the plan was foiled when the liberals of Ploiești, led by Alexandru Candiano-Popescu, failed to receive their stand-down orders and rebelled, leading to what is derisively known as the "Republic of Ploiești". Carada's wife Sultana unwittingly confirmed Chițu's role in the affair, by noting that Candiano had inquired about his fate during the months of repression. Romanian Police received mandates to search Chițu and Stolojan's homes, reportedly finding "letters and compromising encouragements [they] had received from Rosetti."

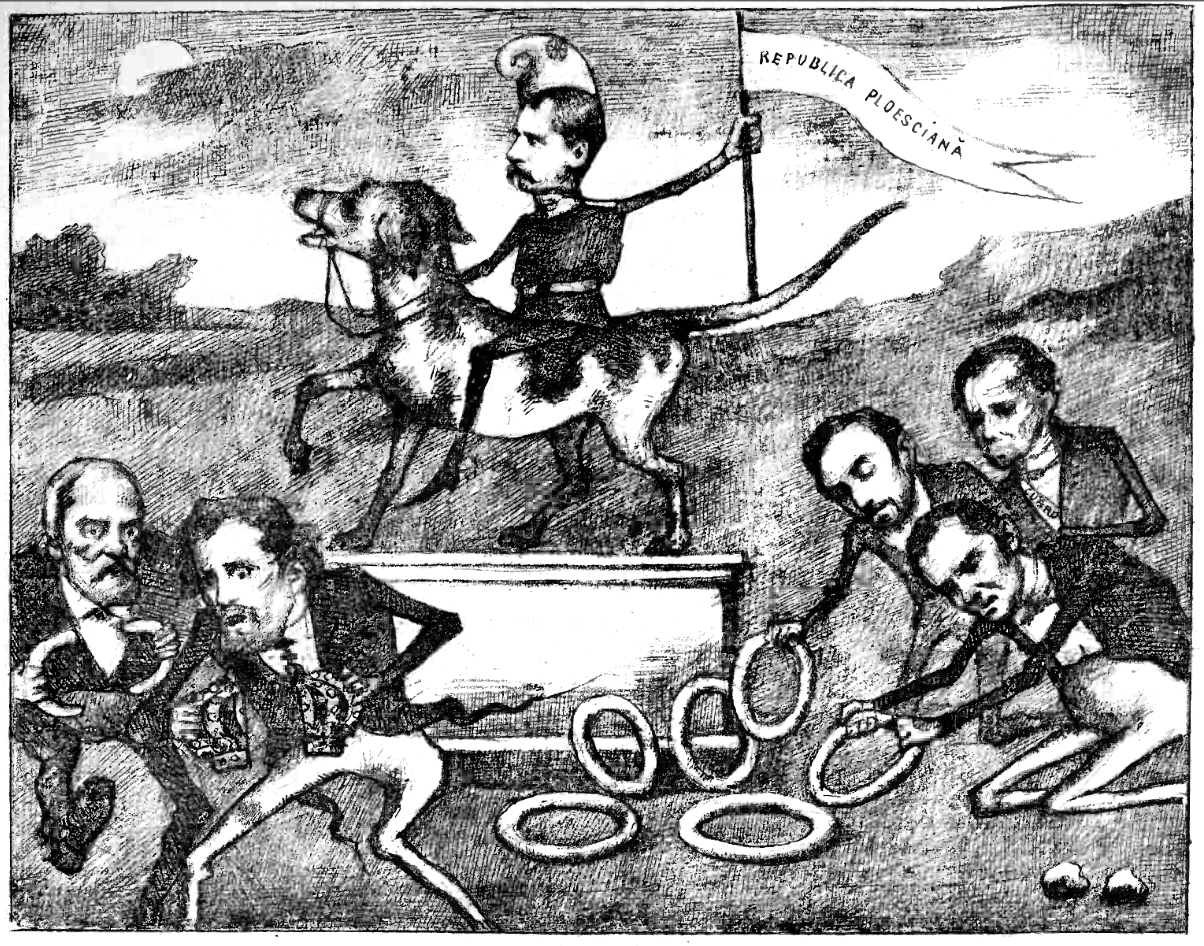
The republican coup as satirized in 1884 by Ciulinul magazine: Alexandru Candiano-Popescu in phrygian cap, mounted on a dog and carrying a banner marked "Republic of Ploiești", is presented with covrigi by other conspirators. C. A. Rosetti and Ion C. Brătianu are pictured on the left; kneeling figures to the right include Chițu, at the forefront

An independent liberal deputy by January 1871, Chițu presented a motion to honor the Italian unification. His speech alluded to the French Third Republic as Romania's "more glorious sister"—read by Marton as an echo of liberal-and-Factionalist Pan-Latinism, as well as an attempt to rekindle solidarity after France's defeat. From September of that same year, he and Theodorian ran a Craiova printing press where they also put out a literary newspaper called Oltenia. Also a book editor, Chițu signed a contract with Constantin D. Aricescu for his monograph on the Wallachian uprising of 1821. Unusually, it stipulated that Aricescu would have to provide a posthumous portrait of the rebel leader, Tudor Vladimirescu, to be completed by Nicolae Grigorescu—"the only one competent enough to give form to this idea", according to Chițu. In that context, the editor mentioned his admiration for Vladimirescu, a "libertarian martyr who had sacrificed himself for national rights and for the betterment of working classes". Chițu finally took personal charge of this project, but failed in his bid to sign up Grigorescu; the task fell on another painter, Theodor Aman, "with whom [Chițu] had a long-standing friendship." Aman's work is arguably the best known among Vladimirescu's depictions. In 1874, Gheorghe and Petre Chițu, together with Aman, established the Craiova Association (Asociațiunea craioveană), a cultural club; it only existed to 1875.

Chițu was among the founders of the National Liberal Party (PNL), signing its new platform in May 1875. By then, he had again resigned his position in the Assembly, at the same time as Candiano, Ion C. Brătianu, George D. Vernescu, Mihail Kogălniceanu, and six other opposition deputies. The walk-out was meant to weaken support for the Lascăr Catargiu government, which had just signed a commercial pact with Austria-Hungary that they viewed as an act of economic submission. As reported by the more left-wing Candiano, in the early 1870s he was integrated within an Oltenian political machine run by Colonel Ion Logadi, which had split the liberal caucus. During the electoral campaign of 1875, Logadi attacked Stolojan but protected Chițu. According to Candiano, the latter was a fine orator, "but spineless"; both Chițu and Stolojan "lacked moral authority in the city, as well as civic courage." Returning to the Assembly, Chițu engaged in verbal jousting with a "White" leader, Manolache Costache Epureanu, over the issue of election reform. Epureanu supported maintaining and even tightening census suffrage, whereas Chițu, who claimed to speak for the PNL as a whole, announced that he supported extension to low-income peasants, with a view to universal suffrage; during their dispute, Epureanu observed that Chițu still wished to maintain some curbs on suffrage, without ever clarifying what these were, and how fair their nature.

=== Education Minister ===
Overall, the electoral tactic proved a success, and Catargiu was recalled in a PNL-and-Factionalist sweep. Chițu was sent to the Assembly by Dolj's 2nd College, taking 119 of 168 possible votes. His first cabinet post was as Religious Affairs and Education Minister—appointed on 27 April 1876, under the premiership of his former "White" adversary Epureanu, he was reconfirmed on 24 July 1876. From that date on, he served under Prime Minister Brătianu (becoming known as Brătianu's "devotee", "right-hand man", and "inseparable companion") to 31 October 1878. His tenure was noted for introducing teachers' rankings and standardizing teachers' examinations—the latter through a law that was finally adopted in 1879. In addition to consolidating the network for vocational education and sponsoring village libraries, Chițu mandated Ortansa Morțun to set up government-sponsored laboratory schools for girls, which were to be spread across Romania. The Commercial School in Craiova, now named in Chițu's honor, was established "only through his persistent efforts". It opened in October 1877, initially with a single class of 14 students; Chițu himself taught commercial law there from 1878 to 1881. For a while, he also taught law at the University of Bucharest.

Chițu's interventions in inspecting the teaching staff resulted in the sacking of a librarian, Mihai Eminescu, who was also a major poet and a member of the anti-liberal club Junimea—whose leader was Ioan Maiorescu's son, the Oltenian Titu Maiorescu. The dismissal is traditionally seen as a sample of liberal intrigues. Scholar Augustin Z. N. Pop writes that Chițu, "instigated" by Dimitrie Petrino, orchestrated Eminescu's downfall and "persistently asked" that the poet be prosecuted. Eminescu's brother, Matei Eminovici, circulated the claim that Mihai had been sidelined by Chițu for his and his family's conservative views. He also attributed blame to another one of Eminescu's rivals, the disgraced academic Andrei Vizanti. In his own overview of the affair, scholar Grigore Moldovan noted:

[Petrino] was a sworn enemy of the poet, because of an unfavorable statement [Eminescu] had made about him in a Romanian newspaper in Budapest. Vizanti used Petrino as a tool in this vengeful case, to destroy Eminescu and to undermine Maiorescu's political credibility and authority. [...] Minister Chițu, trusting in the honesty of his subordinates, ordered a criminal investigation.

As noted by researcher C. Popescu-Cadem, such allegations are inaccurate: Chițu was not in fact wrong to record irregularities in Eminescu's managerial activity, which he decided not to prosecute, and which Eminescu himself had acknowledged. The Junimist critique of liberalism increasingly targeted Chițu: also in 1876, a couplet by Iacob Negruzzi was read at the Junimea banquet, nominating Chițu as a figure from the "old direction" in Romanian culture; in his own polemical articles of the period, Eminescu referred to the minister as Preaoțfinția sa ("His Most Exalted Thiefness"). The conflict also involved Junimist Ioan Slavici. His September 1877 article in Convorbiri Literare defined Chițu as the doyen of "educational radicalism". The group ridiculed the Chițu–Hasdeu relationship, which they regarded as clientelistic. According to Negruzzi, Hasdeu had several times tweaked historical records to emphasize Oltenian contributions "so that Chițu would acknowledge and help him." In tandem, Chițu had to deal with dissent in his own ranks: Kogălniceanu, who claimed to speak for the PNL, questioned Chițu's alleged dealings with the Free and Independent Faction, claiming that Factionalist professors were never investigated for their transgressions.

Continuing his work as a researcher, Chițu also tasked Hasdeu, whom he reintegrated at the University of Bucharest in June 1876, with organizing the teachers into research units that would collect sources regarding ancient Romanian legal customs; he personally ensured that the manuscript of Zilot Românul's chronicle was purchased by the Romanian state. In addition to his juridical questionnaire, he drafted ones for linguistics and mythology, both of which were heavily reliant on suggestions from Hasdeu and Alexandru Odobescu. He was less involved than his immediate predecessors in issues pertaining to archeology and museum education, primarily because he would not intervene in the conflict opposing Dimitrie Papazoglu and Cezar Bolliac, even as the former pressed him to fund a number of surveys in Oltenia. From around May 1877, Chițu followed more closely Grigore Tocilescu's research at Bumbești-Jiu, which would eventually result in the discovery of a Roman castrum.

This ministerial debut was tied to major historical developments which led to Romania's War of Independence (part of the larger Russo-Turkish War). During the preparations of April 1877, Romanian students abroad sent him a letter offering to interrupt their studies and return to Romania as soldiers; Chițu rejected the offer, arguing that their education was more important. Within this setting, he openly endorsed national emancipation from the Ottoman Empire, which also meant collaboration with the Russian Empire; this set him apart from "neutralist" cabinet colleagues such as Dimitrie Sturdza and Nicolae Ionescu. He was however snubbed by the "interventionist" leader Rosetti, who called him an "insignificant" presence among the ministers. In mid 1878, Chițu became noted as a champion of Aromanian nationalism, responding to requests made by Apostol Mărgărit—who was serving as his surveyor of Aromanian Ottoman schools. When the European powers gathered at the Congress of Berlin, he submitted Mărgărit's plea for keeping Janina and Manastir Vilayets out of projects to expand the Kingdom of Greece; this signaled the start of Romanian interventions to make the Aromanians a protected class in the proposed Albanian Vilayet. In 1879, Chițu was one of 35 Romanian political figures co-opted as executives of the Macedo-Romanian Cultural Society, which campaigned for Aromanian emancipation under the suzerainty of Ottoman Sultans.

Also during those months, as Romania gained her full independence, ministers and legislators began assessing projects for administrative reform, framed in terms of decentralization. Chițu sided with those who proposed empowering urban or village councils, rather than mayors—and insisted that the former should elect the latter. Like the Factionalist Ion Codrescu, he proposed that Romanian communes be reassessed every five years to determine whether they qualified as urban as rural. Going back on his support for Russia, Chițu stood out for his speeches against the annexation of Northern Dobruja (which he reportedly viewed as a "nightmare"), received as compensation for Romania's loss of Southern Bessarabia. Though his stance on the matter was singular within the PNL as a whole, and closer to the conservative position, "White" circles were persuaded that Chițu, rather than defending the old Romanian borders, was trying to preserve Northern Dobruja for inclusion in a Greater Bulgaria. Finally accepting the region's annexation by Romania, Chițu was outspokenly against Kogălniceanu, who proposed that the region retain special laws, including those preventing Dobrujan natives from having an equal say in national elections.

=== Other assignments ===
Shortly after the consolidation of the Kingdom of Romania, Chițu, no longer in government, returned to his Assembly seat. He reportedly stood out in his generation for refusing to enrich himself in the Strousberg Affair, despite having access to potentially lucrative secrets of state. During late 1879, Chițu, Catargiu, Emil Costinescu, Dimitrie Gianni, Nicolae Fleva and Eliodor Vergati formed the parliamentary commission which put an end to the scandal by giving to go-ahead to a state monopoly on railways. He was also embracing pragmatism in his dealings with the "Whites" and Junimea: at a time of heightened political tension in early 1878, he and Vernescu tried to persuade other the PNL majority in the Assembly not to invalidate the election of a conservative, Ioan Emanoil Florescu, at Romanați. V. A. Urechia, who became Education Minister in April 1881, wished to further reform in schooling. As he claims in his memoirs, Chițu advised him to tone down his enthusiasm: "Get real, my dear colleague. Do you want us to lose the ministry?" In 1880, he was rapporteur on the creation of the National Bank of Romania (BNR), praising it as a solid example of public–private partnership. Chițu assured his peers that the BNR could not fail, since it was entirely modeled on the National Bank of Belgium. In May 1881, when Austria-Hungary was attempting to use the Treaty of Berlin in order to gain control of the Danube between Galați and the Black Sea, he addressed the Assembly of Deputies on the subject.

Meanwhile, Brătianu persuaded the jaded Chițu not to return to the legal profession, and "assured him in front of witnesses that the country would look after him and his family, a promise forgotten once [Brătianu] died [in 1891]." Chițu was included as one of the four Vice Presidents of the Assembly elected on 15 November 1881—the first such team to be nominated under the Kingdom, they served under Brătianu's brother Dimitrie, the Assembly President. He went on to serve as Finance Minister from December 1881 to January 1882. He was then Justice Minister from January to August 1882 and interim Justice Minister from September to November 1883. While holding that position, he issued guidelines in rural justice. These were meant at reducing time and expenses for peasants who appeared in court. He also made occasional returns as champion of the Aromanian cause, pressing Dinu Nicolache Mihail of Craiova to reverse Hellenization in Magaruva by reopening a Romanian school.

Chițu then became Interior Minister, serving from August 1882 to June 1884. He emerged as a supporter of Carol Hohenzollern, now King of Romania: appearing with the monarch at the June 1883 ceremonies in Iași, he argued that the union of Moldavians and Wallachians could not have been strong enough without the dynasty. During his tenure, he offered covert support to all Romanian clubs operating in the Hungarian partition, and was publicly congratulated by the Romanian nationalists in Arad. Though still a "firebrand" nationalist who dreamed of a Greater Romania (with Transylvania included), in 1882 Chițu took special care of a Hungarian delegation which visited Turnu Severin. His instructions were that the guests, including Lajos Haynald and Mór Jókai, were to be treated with respect, and that the Himnusz would be performed in their honor. Later that year, he oversaw the adoption of an 1864 administrative law; the changes dealt with the manner of confirming mayors in office, their power to maintain public order and the position of police chief. As minister, he issued a damning report on the Bucharest City Council, accusing it of mismanaging funds and incompetence in overseeing modernization works. As a result, the council was dissolved in October 1883, with new elections held early in 1884.

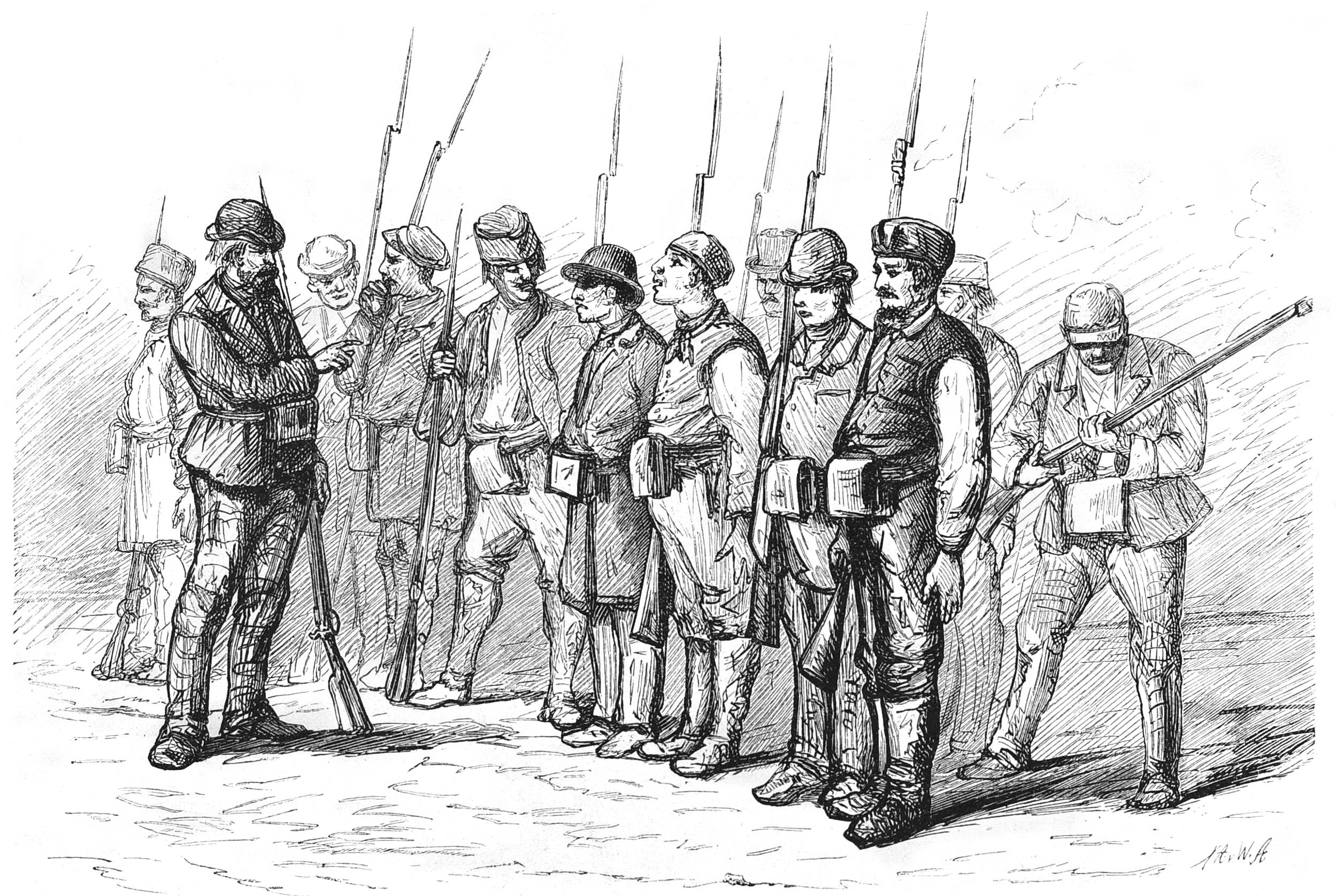
Recruits of the Civic Guard, as pictured in 1877 by Nikolay Karazin

Also in 1884, Chițu presided over the disbanding of the Civic Guard. Established in 1866, this institution's mission was to maintain public order and safety and help defend cities in time of war. Because most of its members came from lower social classes and were of a combative disposition, conservative politicians pressed for their dissolution, with certain mayors defunding the guards. In 1882, their budgetary shortfall widened; meanwhile, more modern police institutions were appearing in Europe, so the time seemed fit to do away with them. In early 1884, when tensions over modifying the 1866 Constitution spilled over into street protests that aimed to install Gheorghe Bibescu's son as King, Chițu helped lead a successful effort to disperse the crowd and restore order.

During an Academy session in November 1881, Chițu returned to his interest in historical depictions, and simultaneously sided with Maiorescu and Ionescu against Hasdeu. They were debating the facial reconstruction of a 15th-century Moldavian Prince, Stephen the Great, with Chițu and the others supporting the (now accepted) claim that Stephen, rather than his son Petru Rareș, is depicted in the Humor Monastery Gospel. Around 1882, Chițu's sister-in-law Maria, born to the Craiova merchant Alexandrescu, completed translations in prose from Dante Aligheri. Some of these were taken up in Columna luĭ Traianŭ, and panned by Eminescu in Timpul. Unlike Stolojan, Gheorghe and Petre Chițu gave endorsement to Hasdeu during the elections of 1883, when he tried to get himself elected at Craiova. Hasdeu eventually lost by a margin of 50 votes, complaining that the minister "could not have supported me". As Negruzzi reports, Hasdeu turned against his protector "once [Chițu] stopped caring about, or was no longer able to fulfill, his wishes."

Chițu's final term in government was a second stint as Education Minister. In June 1884, a group of PNL-sympathizing university students openly asked for his return to the office, seeing him as significantly better than the incumbent, Petre S. Aurelian. Taking over on 23 June, when Aurelian resigned, he remained in this office to 1 February 1885. He resumed his focus on reform, as well as his partnership with Hasdeu, sending the latter on a study trip to Germanic Europe, where he was to report on innovative practices. At the time, National Liberals were going through a rapprochement with the moderate conservatives at Junimea, offering their backing to Brătianu and Chițu's cabinet. Their support was only conditional, and, as sociologist Zigu Ornea notes, they "made no secret" of that fact. In a letter to Sturdza, Junimist Petre P. Carp listed Chițu, Aurelian and Nicolae Voinov as incompetent administrators, who needed to be purged for the PNL alliance to have any future. Chițu's tenure was noted for his decision to reinstate Junimea's Maiorescu to a lecturer's position at the University of Iași. Ornea records it as "strange" that Chițu had only decided to investigate Maiorescu's original sacking (which had occurred in 1871) at a time when the Junimists were relevant for his and Brătianu's political survival.

=== Disability and death ===
In 1879, Chițu had been elected a titular member of the Romanian Academy. From 1887 to 1888, he served as president of the Society for the Education of the Romanian People, also taking a seat on the PNL Central Committee in April 1888. In parallel, he took an executive position at the Central Office of State Monopolies. During the latter part of his career in government, Chițu had imposed a policy of paid "bathing leaves" for ministers, citing his own health issues, and his frequent stays to the mineral springs in Mehadia, as an example. Balneologist Gheorghe Vuia quoted him approvingly: "Minister Chițu puts it in plain words, that he would not be alive without Mehadia".

Having resigned his last ministerial position for reasons of health, Chițu was by then too frail to contribute to the public debate, a "powerless witness" to the incidents which caused Brătianu's toppling and the rise of a Junimist-led "United Opposition". His physical decline relates to his unrestrained alcohol consumption, which became a topic of public ridicule—one such episode played out in the Assembly, where Junimea deputy Costică Bobeică quipped about his habitual drinking of Madeira wine. As early as May 1884, Ciulinul paper joked that Chițu was going to leave government because of its support for a temperance law. Another satirical note in June 1885 claimed that Bucharest's beer gardens had fitted the Assembly Hall with taps, "so that Messrs deputies might consume refreshments without ever getting up. These works shall be inspected by Mr Chițu." Candiano reports that Chițu was a functioning alcoholic throughout his political career, but that his addiction eventually resulted in "a state of idiocy". Serving as Carol's Adjutant in the 1880s, he claims to have personally witnessed the minister's final descent into mental illness:

Being simultaneously a drunk and a minister, he called upon a dentist to pull out the roots of all his molars and his front teeth, intending to have dentures fitted in. The dentist followed his command, but the intervention left him [Chițu] with a violent case of brain trauma. [...] Had he lived in any other society, one that would exercise a more rigorous control over him, perhaps his life would have extinguished as a star that leaves behind some traces of light, and not as a poorly made gas lamp, stinking up the room when turned off.

According to Vasculescu, Chițu was diagnosed with paralysis, which left him confined to his property in Mirila village, near his birthplace; in 1891, his official residence was still recorded as Berzei Street 77, Bucharest. In these final years of his political career, he could no longer count on the support of Craiova's middle-class voters. As reported by Lupta newspaper, in June 1887 he and his brother Petre had formed their own electoral club, in opposition to Stolojan's, but, fearing a split of the PNL vote, agreed to a reunification in September. According to this source, neither Gheorghe Chițu nor Stolojan were present in the city when these events unfolded; the former was seen by his potential voters as ramolit ("decrepit"). In November, Vocea Covurluiuluĭ newspaper alleged that:

For a few months now, the government [...] has not been very favorable of Mr G. Chițu, who, in some of his private reunions, has been heard criticizing the administration, and hence it has sent Mr Stolojan to make his way to Craiova, his birthplace, and, once there, to contain the influence exercised by the Chițu family [...].

The election of January 1888 saw Gheorghe Chițu losing the seat to August Pessiacov. Commenting on these developments, the opposition's Take Ionescu observed that the PNL itself was getting weaker, since Chițu had "fallen" despite benefiting from the political machine, which prevented any other candidate from even mildly criticizing him. Chițu rebounded in a different area, to become a deputy for the 3rd College in Olt County, where he took all possible 400 votes. While Ciocazan believes this was evidence of his being loved by peasants, adversaries alleged widespread fraud by Prefect Tache Protopopescu. Petre Chițu also ran at Craiova, and managed to obtain a deputy's seat there—his election was contested by the opposition and only validated in February, but he resigned on 23 March. Also that March, Gheorghe Chițu helped sway the Assembly vote in favor of granting a life annuity to Eminescu, his former rival, who had been incapacitated by a degenerative illness.

During the Senate race of October, Chițu had to submit to a ballotage at Dolj's 1st College, after taking 109 votes—only four more than his former patron Logadi. He eventually won 152 votes to 130. He had bought Mirila in 1880, but had taken multiple mortgage loans on it to pay for his son's expenses. Around the time of his final return to the Assembly, his house on Unirei Street, Craiova was being confiscated and auctioned off. Retiring from politics later in 1888, his activity as a nationalist was continued by Petre Chițu, who set up the Craiova chapter of the Cultural League for the Unity of All Romanians (January 1894). During early 1889 Gheorghe was reportedly being investigated for his and Brătianu's role at the Urban Credit Society, which they allegedly tried to control by unlawful means. Chițu was bedridden for almost another decade, but, as claimed in March 1897 by the Junimist Ion Luca Caragiale, none of the PNL leaders, "not even one, went over there to inquire about him, to see him, to support his arm [...] as he raised a jug of water to his lips." He eventually died on 27 October of that year, at Mirila. On 1 November, his body was taken for burial at Sineasca Cemetery, Craiova, after a funeral service at Madona Dudu. He was reportedly granted a state funeral, with Brătianu, Sturdza, Stolojan and Tocilescu as guest speakers—alongside Colonel Gratosky, who represented King Carol.

== Legacy ==
According to Ciocazan, Chițu "could have set himself aside a fine fortune from his honest work, to provide security to himself and his family, but, being held up by his handling of various ministries, he died in poverty." In 1902, Mirila estate, the family's only remaining property, was auctioned off to settle the outstanding debt. Alecsandrina lost the appeal she made to the Court of Cassation in 1903. Her daughter Elena had married Ciocazan in 1884, dying in February 1929, a full 13 years before her husband. They had had one son, Constantin "Tantzi" Ciocazan, who died without heirs in Paris in 1915. Alexandru Chițu survived his father by over a decade. According to research done by Craiova lawyer Nicu Vintilă, he died childless in or before 1915; in December 1924, Beatrice Weller, 30-year-old wife of the Austrian banker Franz Georg Weller, requested Romanian citizenship, reporting that she was the daughter of Alexandru and Speranța Chițu. Dying in August 1932, she had two living brothers, Major Felice Chițu and Alexandru "Sandi" Chițu (the latter of whom died in 1942). The minister was also outlived by his sister-in-law Maria, whose daughters were the French-language poet Lucilla Chițu and pianist Aurelia Kitzu Arimondi.

Already in 1898, Petre Popescu, the headmaster of the People's School of Arts and Crafts, commissioned a young Constantin Brâncuși to sculpt a bust of Gheorghe Chițu, as the school's patron. Only a plaster version was ever completed, and has since been lost. According to art scholar Barbu Brezianu, this and other five busts by the young Brâncuși were missed-out opportunities, rejected by local authorities who had a "lack of understanding" toward the sculptor's modernizing tendencies. Dolj County officials preferred another artist, Constantin Bălăcescu, who claimed to have taken Chițu's death mask. It was cast in bronze during November 1898, and then placed inside the Commercial School. The minister's parliamentary speeches were collected by Tocilescu and published as a book in 1904; in October 1907, Bucharest City Council renamed Crinului Street into G. Chițu Street. In January 1922, Arhivele Olteniei journal inaugurated the "Oltenian Figures" series with a portrait of Chițu, the "great Oltenian and good Romanian". Noting that he was only remembered for a street in Craiova that still carried his name, Arhivele editors began a subscription for a monument in his honor.

In October 1925, Justice Minister Gheorghe Gh. Mârzescu unveiled a statue of Chițu, placed inside Craiova's Palace of Justice. A marble bust of Chițu, the work of Wladimir C. Hegel, was placed in the Assembly Hall in February 1903. Yet another such work was put up for public display as part of Aleea Personalităților, a Craiova statuary complex. His name and status as a "great intellectual and politician, [...] a propagator and founder of commercial education" were again mentioned during the Commercial School's centennial in 1977. The following year, Paul Anghel published Te Deum la Grivița, an historical novel dealing with the War of Independence. It featured Chițu as one of the background characters. As recounted by Vintilă, by 2010 his burial spot at Sineasca had been entirely forgotten by officials, and was incorrectly given as Mirila or another rural locality in various reference works.
