= First Sturdza cabinet =

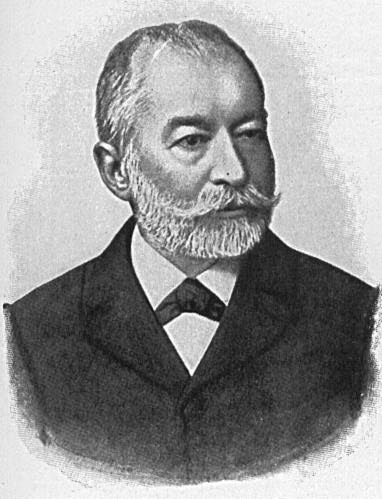
Dimitrie A. Sturdza

The first cabinet of Dimitrie Sturdza was the government of Romania from 4 October 1895 to 21 November 1896.

== Composition ==
The ministers of the cabinet were as follows:

- President of the Council of Ministers:

- Dimitrie Sturdza (4 October 1895 - 21 November 1896)

- Minister of the Interior:

- Nicolae Fleva (4 October 1895 - 15 January 1896)
- (interim) Dimitrie Sturdza (15 January - 3 February 1896)
- Anastase Stolojan (3 February - 21 November 1896)

- Minister of Foreign Affairs:

- Dimitrie Sturdza (4 October 1895 - 21 November 1896)

- Minister of Finance:

- George C. Cantacuzino-Râfoveanu (4 October 1895 - 21 November 1896)

- Minister of Justice:

- Eugeniu Stătescu (4 October 1895 - 21 November 1896)

- Minister of War:

- Gen. Constantin Budișteanu (4 October 1895 - 21 November 1896)

- Minister of Religious Affairs and Public Instruction:

- Petru Poni (4 October 1895 - 21 November 1896)

- Minister of Agriculture, Industry, Commerce, and Property:

- Gheorghe Pallade (4 October 1895 - 21 November 1896)

- Minister of Public Works:

- Constantin Stoicescu (4 October 1895 - 21 November 1896)

Preceded by Fourth Lascăr Catargiu cabinet	Cabinet of Romania; 4 October 1895 - 21 November 1896	Succeeded by Aurelian cabinet
