= Aurelian cabinet =

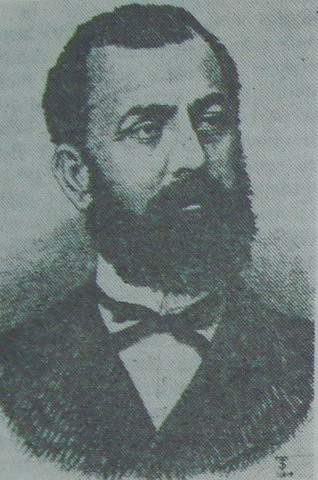
Petre S. Aurelian

The first cabinet of Petre S. Aurelian was the government of Romania from 21 November 1896 to 26 March 1897.

== Composition ==
The ministers of the cabinet were as follows:

- President of the Council of Ministers:

- Petre S. Aurelian (21 November 1896 - 26 March 1897)

- Minister of the Interior:

- Vasile Lascăr (21 November 1896 - 26 March 1897)

- Minister of Foreign Affairs:

- Constantin I. Stoicescu (21 November 1896 - 13 March 1897)
- (interim) Petre S. Aurelian (13 - 26 March 1897)

- Minister of Finance:

- George C. Cantacuzino-Râfoveanu (21 November 1896 - 13 March 1897)
- (interim) Vasile Lascăr (13 - 26 March 1897)

- Minister of Justice:

- Ștefan Șendrea (21 November 1896 - 26 March 1897)

- Minister of War:

- (interim) Constantin Stoicescu (21 - 25 November 1896)
- Gen. Anton Berindei (25 November 1896 - 26 March 1897)

- Minister of Religious Affairs and Public Instruction:

- George Mârzescu (21 November 1896 - 26 March 1897)

- Minister of Agriculture, Industry, Commerce, and Property:

- Petre S. Aurelian (21 November 1896 - 26 March 1897)

- Minister of Public Works:

- Emanoil Porumbaru (21 November 1896 - 26 March 1897)

Preceded by First Sturdza cabinet	Cabinet of Romania; 21 November 1896 - 26 March 1897	Succeeded by Second Sturdza cabinet
