= Second Sturdza cabinet =

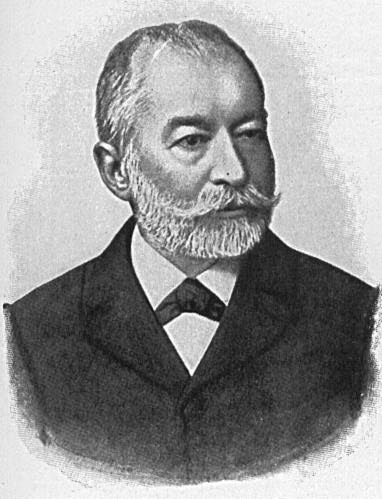
Dimitrie A. Sturdza

The second cabinet of Dimitrie Sturdza was the government of Romania from 31 March 1897 to 30 March 1899.

== Composition ==
The ministers of the cabinet were as follows:

- President of the Council of Ministers:

- Dimitrie Sturdza (31 March 1897 - 30 March 1899)

- Minister of the Interior:

- Mihail Pherekyde (31 March 1897 - 30 March 1899)

- Minister of Foreign Affairs:

- Dimitrie Sturdza (31 March 1897 - 30 March 1899)

- Minister of Finance:

- George C. Cantacuzino-Râfoveanu (31 March 1897 - 1 October 1898)
- Gheorghe Pallade (1 October 1898 - 30 March 1899)

- Minister of Justice:

- Alexandru Djuvara (31 March 1897 - 5 January 1898)
- (interim) Anastase Stolojan (5 - 12 January 1898)
- Gheorghe Pallade (12 January - 1 October 1898)
- Constantin Stoicescu (1 October 1898 - 30 March 1899)

- Minister of War:

- Gen. Anton Berindei (31 March 1897 - 30 March 1899)

- Minister of Religious Affairs and Public Instruction:

- Spiru Haret (31 March 1897 - 30 March 1899)

- Minister of Agriculture, Industry, Commerce, and Property:

- Anastase Stolojan (31 March 1897 - 29 January 1899)
- (interim) Dimitrie Sturdza (29 January -30 March 1899)

- Minister of Public Works:

- Ion I. C. Brătianu (31 March 1897 - 30 March 1899)

Preceded by Aurelian cabinet	Cabinet of Romania; 31 March 1897 - 30 March 1899	Succeeded by First Cantacuzino cabinet
