= List of people from Craiova =

This is a list of people from Craiova, Romania.

- Constantin Angelescu (1870–1948), interim Prime Minister (1933-1934)
- Constantin Argetoianu (1871–1955), Prime Minister (between 28 September and 23 November 1939)
- Aurelia Kitzu Arimondi (1860s–1941), singer and voice teacher
- Corneliu Baba (1906–1997), painter
- Doina Badea (1940–1977), singer of popular music
- Gheorghe Bibescu (1804–1873), Prince of Wallachia (1843-1848)
- Lola Bobesco (1921–2003), violinist
- Adrian Cioroianu (1967–), historian, Foreign Minister (2007-2008)
- Constantin Coandă (1857–1932), soldier, Prime Minister (1918)
- George Constantinescu (1881–1965), inventor
- Paul Curteanu (1983–), football player
- Traian Demetrescu (1866–1896), poet
- Alexandru Dobriceanu (1894–1978), general
- Diana Dondoe (1982–), model
- Dimitrie Gerota (1867–1939), anatomist and physician
- D. Iacobescu (1893–1913), poet
- Adriana Iliescu (1938–), author, briefly the oldest birth mother on record
- Marius Ionescu (1984–), long-distance runner
- Titu Maiorescu (1840–1917), Prime Minister (1913–1914)
- Valter Mărăcineanu (1840–1877), soldier, fought in the War of Independence
- Ludovic Mrazec (1867–1944), geologist, President of the Romanian Academy
- Jean Negulesco (1900–1993), film director
- Marcel Olteanu (1872–1943), general
- Constantin Titel Petrescu (1888–1957), Social Democratic politician
- Eduard Prugovečki (1937–2003), physicist and mathematician
- Constantin Sănătescu (1885–1947), soldier, Prime Minister (1944)
- Mihail Șerban (1930–2004), biochemist
- Francisc Șirato (1877–1953), painter
- Mihai Stănișoară (1962–), Defense Minister (2008-2009)
- Barbu Dimitrie Știrbei (1799–1869), Prince of Wallachia (1848–1853; 1854–1856)
- Nicolae Titulescu (1882–1941), Foreign Minister (1927–1928), League of Nations General Assembly President (1930–1932)
- Ion Țuculescu (1910–1962), painter
- Nicolae Vasilescu-Karpen (1870–1964), engineer
- Varujan Vosganian (1958–), National Liberal politician
