= Mirila =

Stone monuments in Croatia

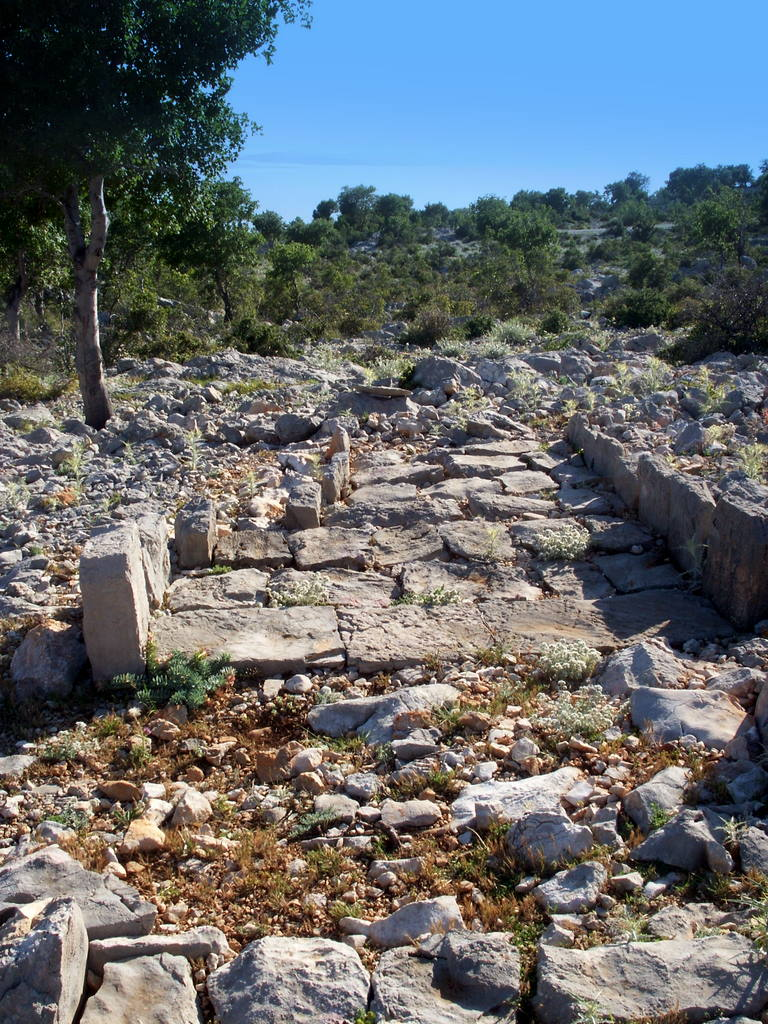
Mirila near Ljubotić

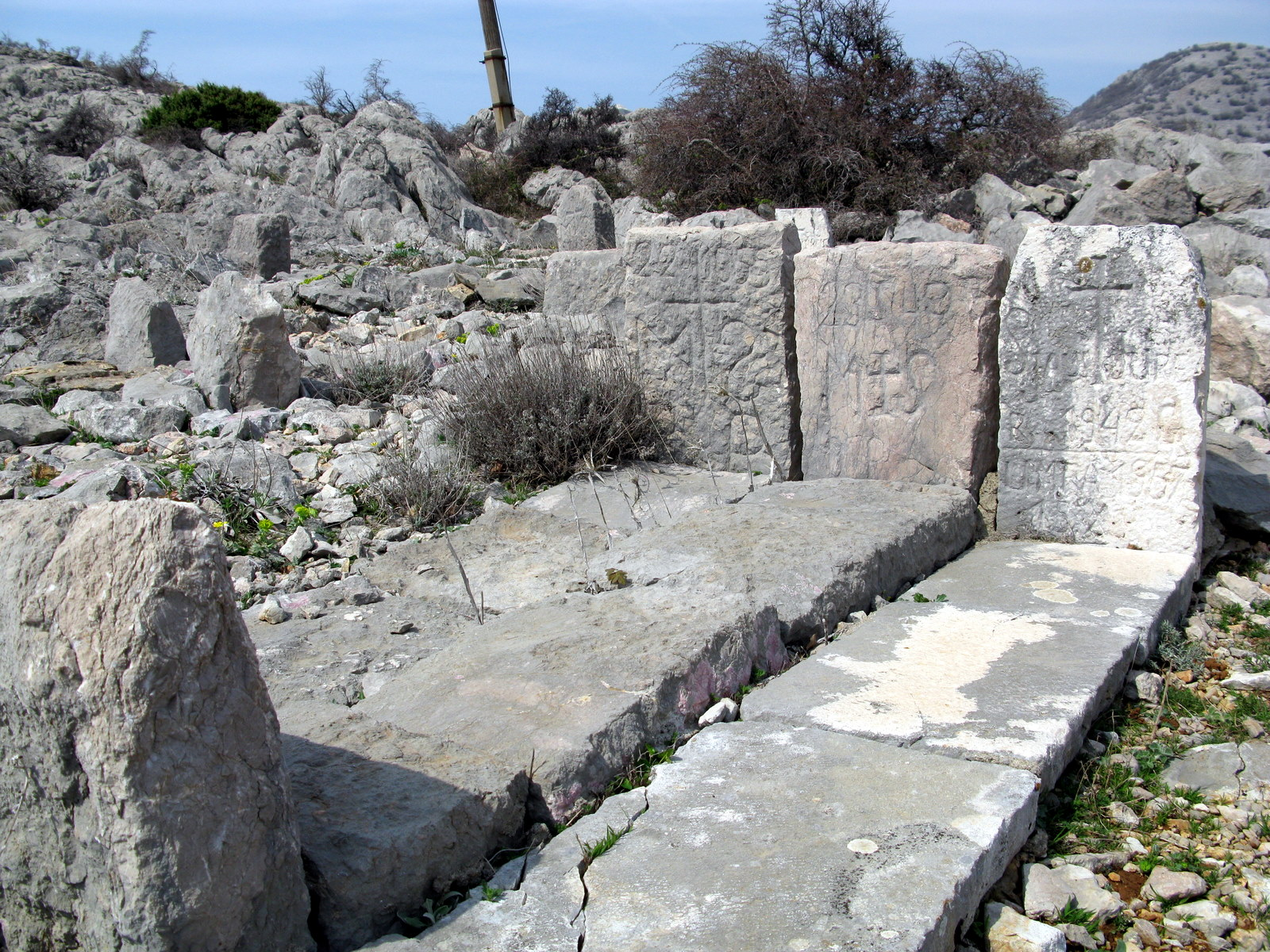
Mirila

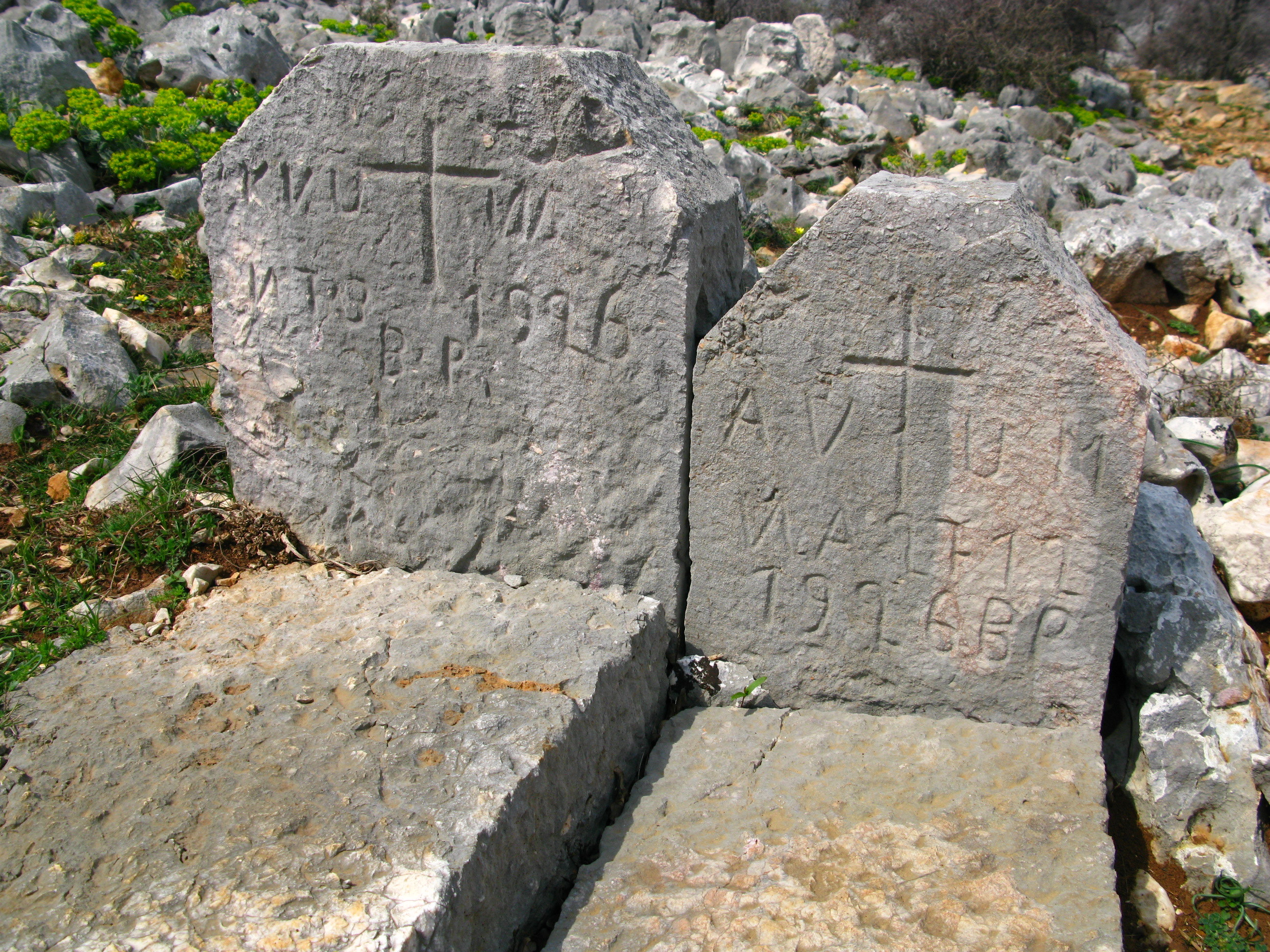
Mirila near Ljubotić

Mirila are funeral memorials or stone monuments to the departed located on Velebit in Croatia. They can be found along the mountain paths, passes, elevations and clearings of Velebit.

They originated between the 17th and 20th centuries. The residents of Velebit would carry the deceased to cemeteries that were several kilometers away from the homes of the deceased without stopping to rest. Typically, halfway from a deceased's home to the cemetery, the bearers were allowed to rest, and at that spot, mirila were created.

While the deceased was on the mirila or shortly after, the space between the two stones was paved with flat stones, and shallow reliefs were carved on the headstone.

According to folk beliefs, when they laid the deceased was put on the ground, the soul left the body of the deceased right there. That made the mirila more important than the actual graves because the graves were only the places to put the body in, while the soul remained at the mirila. For this reason, mirila were visited, flowers were left on them, and prayers for the deceased were offered at the mirila, unlike the grave of the deceased, whose bones would eventually be removed to make space for another family member (since graves did not hold much significance for them).
