= Paul Curteanu =

Romanian football player

Personal information
- Date of birth: 27 July 1983 (age 43)
- Place of birth: Craiova, Romania
- Height: 1.82 m (6 ft 0 in)
- Position: Left back

Team information
- Current team: FC Drobeta

Senior career*
Years	Team	Apps	(Gls)
2003–2004	Extensiv Craiova	7	(0)
2004–2008	Universitatea Craiova	10	(0)
2008–2009	Gaz Metan	14	(0)
2009–	FC Drobeta		
- * Club domestic league appearances and goals

Paul Curteanu (born 27 July 1983 in Craiova) is a Romanian football player, currently under contract with FC Drobeta.

== See also ==
- Football in Romania
- List of football clubs in Romania
