= Anastase Stolojan =

Wallachian-born Romanian politician

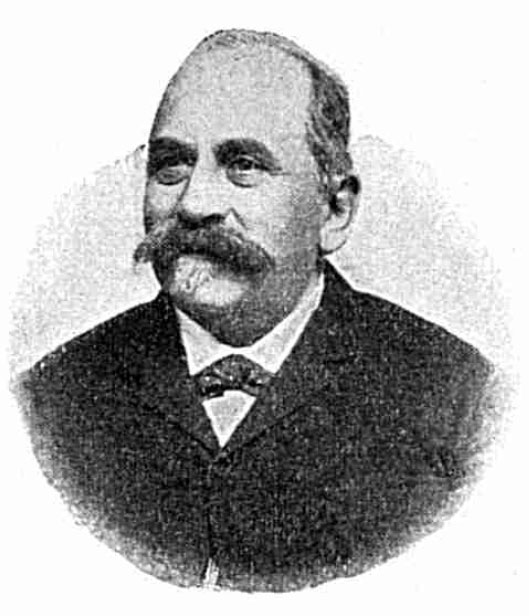
- Anastase Stolojan

Personal details
- Born: 6 August 1836 Craiova, Wallachia
- Died: 25 July 1901 (aged 64) Bucharest, Romania
- Citizenship: Romanian
- Party: National Liberal Party
- Education: University of Paris
- Occupation: Politician, jurist
- Profession: Lawyer
- Awards: Order of the Star of Romania; Order of the Crown (Romania)

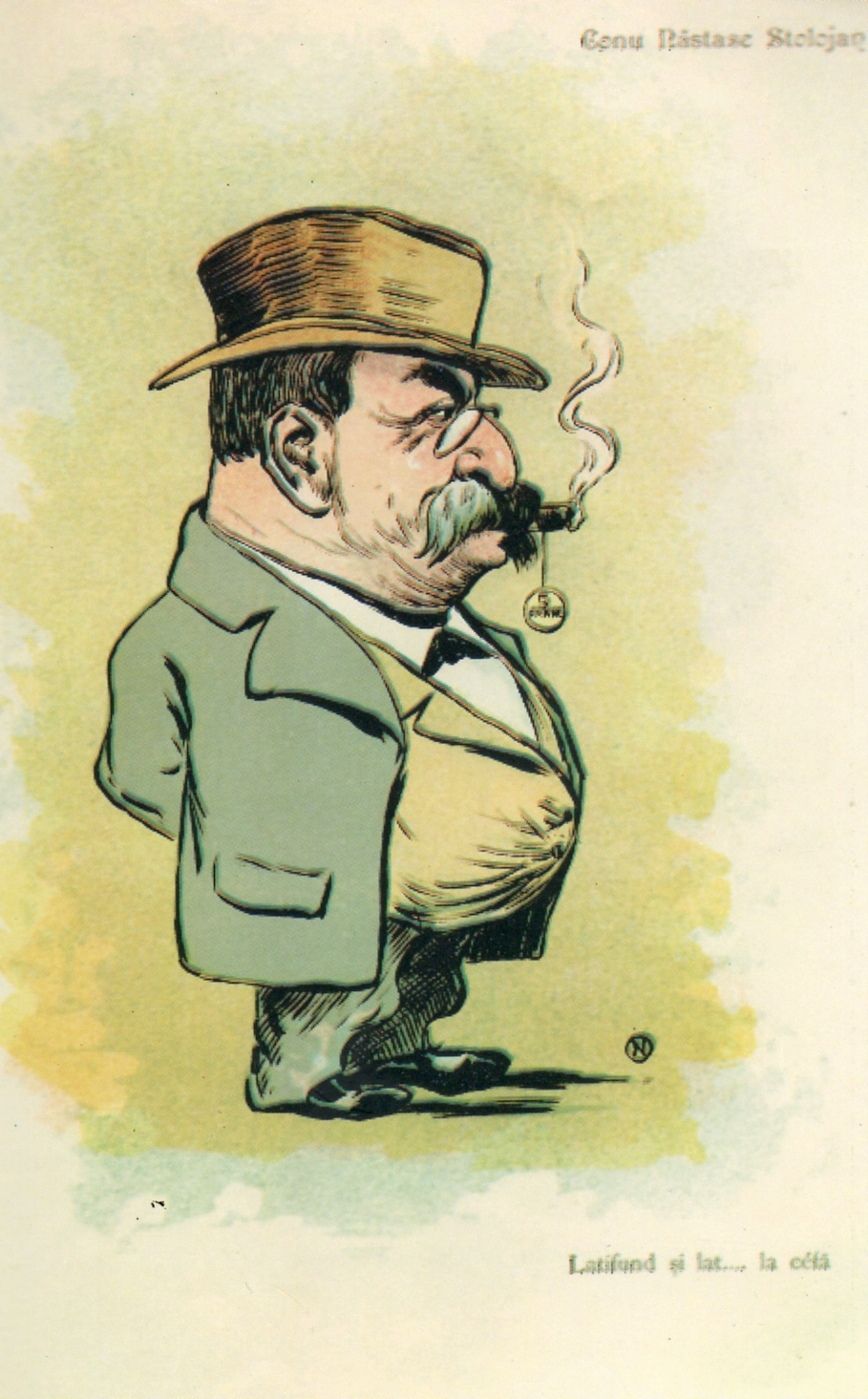
Caricature by Nicolae Petrescu Găină

Anastase Stolojan (6 August 1836 – 25 July 1901) was a Wallachian-born Romanian politician.

Born in Craiova, he descended from a family of small-scale boyars that came from Stolojani village in Gorj County. His father's state was a vistier (treasurer). He attended school in his native city before continuing his education in France. In 1863, he graduated from the law faculty of the University of Paris, in the process earning a doctorate. Stolojan entered the magistracy at Craiova in 1865, becoming a prosecutor for the Dolj County tribunal and the appeals court. In 1868, he served as mayor of Craiova. Politically liberal and a close associate of C. A. Rosetti, he was first elected to the Assembly of Deputies in 1869, with support from both liberals and their opposition. He was a supporter of the 1870 Republic of Ploiești conspiracy, and letters with compromising instructions from Rosetti were found in his possession.

Stolojan was a signatory of the National Liberal Party's initial program in 1875. In April 1877, he and Alexandru Candiano-Popescu drafted a resolution calling for the government to launch the Romanian War of Independence. He served in several Liberal cabinets. Under Ion C. Brătianu, he was Justice Minister from July 1879 to July 1880, and was interim Interior Minister for four days in July 1880. Then, from February 1885 to October 1886, he was Minister of Agriculture, Domains, Industry and Commerce. Under Dimitrie A. Sturdza, he was Interior Minister from February to November 1896 and again held the Agriculture portfolio from March 1897 to January 1899.

A distinguished orator, he drew attention for his vigorous objection to a law on mines drafted by Petre P. Carp in 1895. The proposal indicated that if landowners were unwilling to exploit mines on their property, the state could intervene to force their opening. This was viewed as an assault on the principle of the inviolability of property, and Stolojan contested it until the end, withdrawing from the chamber while it was being voted on. Himself a landowner, Stolojan had some 12 hectares of vineyards, properties at Stolojani and Rușina, purchased the Herești domain in 1881, and was leasing a Gorj County property as of 1886. He owned a lavish home in Bucharest, which his descendants sold in the 1920s; since that time, it has served as the Italian Embassy.

In 1878, Stolojan was made a commander in the Order of the Star of Romania; he was also awarded the grand cross of the Order of the Crown. In 1872, he was initiated in Craiova's Unirea Masonic Lodge. He is buried at Bellu cemetery.
