= Aurelia Kitzu Arimondi =

Romanian singer

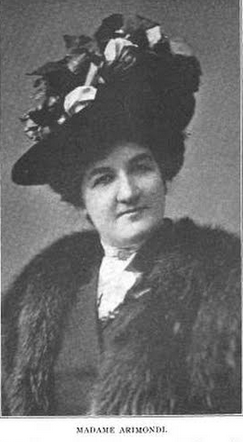
- Aurelia Kitzu Arimondi, from a 1908 publication
- Born: Craiova, Romania
- Died: July 28, 1941; Chicago, Illinois, U.S.
- Other name: Aurelia Chițu
- Occupations: Opera singer, voice teacher
- Spouse: Vittorio Arimondi
- Relatives: Gheorghe Chițu (uncle)

Aurelia Kitzu Arimondi (1860s – July 28, 1941) was a Romanian-born opera singer and voice teacher in New York City and Chicago.

== Early life and education ==
Kitzu was born in Craiova, Romania (some sources say Bucharest). Lawyer and politician Gheorghe Chițu was her uncle; her sister was educator Marie Kitzu Arnold. She trained as a singer at the Royal Conservatory Giuseppe Verde.

== Career ==
Kitzu, a mezzo-soprano, sang in many European cities, especially at La Scala in Milan, and Covent Garden in London. She toured in South America in the 1890s, appearing at the Teatro Solís with José Oxilia. She made her New York debut in 1895, as Lola in Cavalleria Rusticana. She sang at the Metropolitan Opera House and taught singing in New York City in the 1900s. "Madame Arimondi has the grace and culture of a true cosmopolitan," reported the Musical Courier in 1908.

Arimondi and her husband Vittorio Arimondi taught in Chicago in after 1916. The Arimondis also produced a series of musicales featuring their students. In 1925 they joined the faculty of the Chicago Musical College.

== Personal life ==
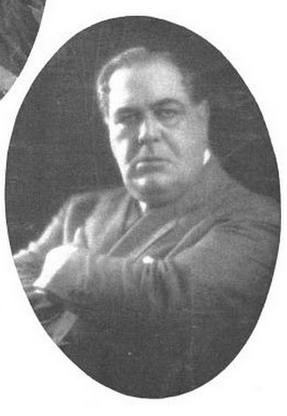
Kitzu's husband, Italian-born singer Vittorio Arimondi, from a 1922 publication

Kitzu met Italian opera singer Vittorio Arimondi in South America; they married in 1896. They moved to Chicago in 1910. The Arimondis were featured on the cover of The Musical Leader in 1922, billed as "among the most successful teachers and artists of America." Her husband died in 1928, and she died in 1941, probably in her seventies, in Chicago.
