= Republic of Ploiești =

1870 revolt against the Romanian monarchy

Coordinates: 44°56′N 26°2′E

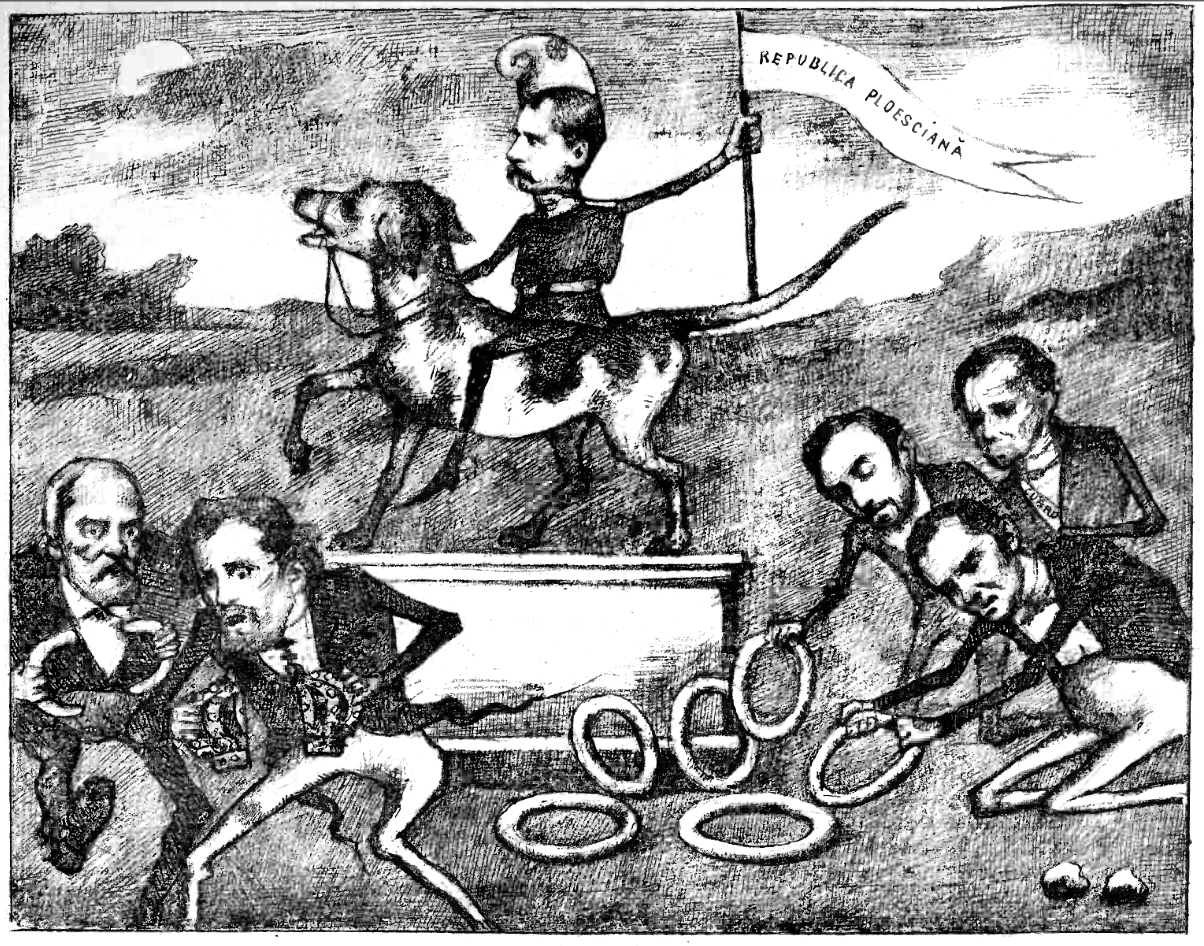
The republican coup as satirized in 1884 by Ciulinul magazine: Alexandru Candiano-Popescu in phrygian cap, mounted on a dog, is being presented with covrigi by fellow conspirators

The Republic of Ploiești (Romanian: Republica de la Ploiești) was a revolt against the princely Romanian monarchy in the city of Ploiești, Romania, on 8 August, 1870.

== Background ==
The Republic of Ploiești is the name of a movement from 8 August 1870, considered as the last great attempt of revolution in the Romanian space of the 19th century or the last wave of the revolution of 1848. In the Romanian historiography before 1989, this movement was considered anti-dynastic.

Romanian liberal radicals of Ploiești and elsewhere were opposed to the new ruler of the country, Prince Carol of Hohenzollern-Sigmaringen (future King of Romania), and desired a republic to replace the monarchy established by the 1866 Constitution – the main argument being that a new constitutional system, viewed as more democratic, was to put an end to the partnership between the monarch and the Conservatives (which had effectively blocked the Liberals out of government).

Although many Liberals had contributed to the creation of the "monstrous coalition" (which had toppled Alexandru Ioan Cuza on February 22 (February 11 O.S.), 1866), the deep resentment of Carol's politics, added to the perception that he had remained a foreigner linked to Prussia, had initially led to republican projects advocated by both the most left-wing Liberal faction (the "Reds", led by C. A. Rosetti) and the Liberal leader Ion Brătianu, and ultimately led to "coup d'état plans". At the same time, for many lower-level plotters, Cuza had arguably conserved his status image as both an anti-establishment social reformer and, given that his rule had preceded the Constitution, a quasi-republican political figure. Other less prominent factors included the revolutionary tradition inside the Liberal groups (see: 1848 Moldavian Revolution and 1848 Wallachian Revolution), as well as the persistence of French models in Liberal rhetoric. Although references to French republicanism itself had been moving out of focus after the replacement of the Second French Republic with the Empire, the outbreak of the Franco-Prussian War in July fueled the Liberals' resentment of Prussia.

The leader of the Ploiești Liberals was Captain Alexandru Candiano-Popescu, who, in 1867, as the owner of the newspaper "Perseverența", had been arrested and had his newspaper shut down for anti-Carol articles which were interpreted as libel. Earlier in 1870 he had again been arrested for the articles he published in the newspaper "Democrația".

== The conspiracy ==
On August 8, two secret meetings of the Liberals were organized and Candiano-Popescu announced that he had information from Bucharest that the monarchy would be overthrown the next night, that all major cities were preparing for a revolt, and that a Romanian Republic would be proclaimed. He also assured them that the Republican movement had the support of major European powers and as such there would be no foreign invasion in support of Carol. Candiano-Popescu announced that he was to serve as the new prefect of Prahova County, and that Stan Popescu would be the new chief of the Ploieşti police; further roles in the planned administration were assigned to each of the plotters.

That night everything went as planned: the chief of police and the Prefect were arrested, the telegraph station was occupied by Comiano and Guță Antonescu, and Candiano-Popescu occupied the firehouse, wearing his captain's uniform "to look like he has more authority".

Just before dawn, Candiano-Popescu, armed with a revolver and with the help of another 40–50 persons, captured the telegraph operator, Grigore Iorgulescu. Although the latter was put under strict supervision, a couple of hours later his guards were inebriated, and he was able to send a telegram to Prime Minister Manolache Costache Epureanu's residence in Bucharest, asking what the situation was there (fearing that the coup had taken hold of the capital). The answer was that everything was calm and that there was nothing unusual happening. Iorgulescu then notified Epureanu of what had happened in Ploiești.

Meanwhile, the plotters, who had occupied the post office, sent a telegram to Bucharest announcing that Prefect Candiano had the allegiance of the Ploieşti civilian administration and the military.

On the evening of 9 August, soldiers from Bucharest arrived at the Ploieşti train station and arrested the new "administration", most of whom declared that they were not actually revolting, thinking it was just a party.

== Aftermath ==
Thirty-six of the leaders of the movement were accused of "revolt against the government". Many other leaders of the Liberals, including Ion Brătianu, Nicolae Golescu, Bogdan Petriceicu Hasdeu, and Nicolae Kretzulescu, were arrested under suspicion of having backed the conspiracy. The trials of the civilians who took part in the revolt were eventually moved to Târgoviște and, on October 17, 1870, they were found not guilty.

Republican projects faded out of the forefront during the following decade, when Brătianu and Carol reached a compromise which inaugurated a virtually unchallenged Liberal supremacy between 1876 (when Brătianu became premier) and 1889. On the one hand, the monarchy was consolidated with Liberal approval (the creation of the Romanian Kingdom in 1881); on the other, the Constitution was amended in 1883 to accommodate an electoral reform which extended representation and increased the voting power of Liberal electors.

== Caragiale ==
The mundane aspects of the Ploieşti republican experiment became the subject of derision in literary circles associated with the conservative Junimea. Satires dealing with or alluding to the episode were created by Ion Luca Caragiale, who often used his prose to mock the bombastic tone of the Liberal press.

In his piece Boborul, Caragiale actually records the events, revisiting his experiences as a seventeen-year-old eyewitness (and makes some unverifiable claims, such as having been created a deputy police commissioner by Candiano-Popescu, the latter being "president of the Republic"). His ironic account, centered on scenes of excessive drinking and a fête atmosphere, implies that the Republic would have actually functioned as a separate country:

"In the space of our century, a very interesting state was born and ended, one that no scrupulous historian should ignore. I wish to speak of the Ploieşti Republic, a state which, although it has lasted only fifteen hours, has for sure marked a celebrated page in contemporary history. Born out of, through, and for the people, at around two o'clock in the morning of August 8, 1870, the young republic was smothered on the same day, around four o'clock in the afternoon. Never mind! the greatness and importance of states are not judged by their extent and duration, but by the more or less brilliant role they have played in the universal system."

The word boborul itself, a distortion of poporul, "the people", has since acquired popularity in Romania, and is used to ridicule perceived demagoguery and its rhetoric. Its exact use in the piece forms the climax of the short plot, during the depiction of what Caragiale calls "the Reaction". After having fallen asleep at his desk, the hungover Stan Popescu is rudely awaken by the group of officers charged with bringing back order, and answers to the short and direct question "Who has placed you here?" with the mumbled "boborul" (translatable as "the beoble").

Another famous reference introduced by Caragiale is D-ale carnavalului ("Carnival Adventures"), where Mița Baston, a hysterical woman, snaps at the man she believes is cheating on her:

"Yes, [...] I want to cause a scandal, yes... since you have forgotten me, you have forgotten everything: you have forgotten that I am a daughter of the people and that I am violent; you have forgotten that I am a republican, that in my veins runs the blood of February 11 martyrs [in reference to the deposition of Prince Cuza]; [...] you have forgotten that I am a Ploieşti native – yes, a Ploiești native – buddy, and I shall pull you a revolution, but not just any revolution... one to remember me by!..."

Further pokes at the Liberals are taken in Conu Leonida faţă cu reacţiunea ("Mr. Leonida Faces the Reaction"), a play centered on Leonida and his wife Efimiţa, an elderly and radical couple of the Bucharest petite bourgeoisie who, when listening to the noise of a street brawl while tucked into bed, interpret it to mean the start of a coup d'état against the Liberal government. Believing that, on some level, he would have to suffer the consequences of "The Reaction", Mr. Leonida hatches out an escape plan:

"We'll walk to the train station on the other side of Cişmigiu, and sometime till morning we'll catch the train to Ploieşti... There, I shan't be afraid anymore: I'll be among my own kind! all of them republicans, poor souls!"

Such harsh criticism was denied basis by several literary figures of another generation, those left-wing intellectuals centered on Poporanism, who viewed radicalism as traditional and important in the development of Romanian culture. In his Spiritual critic în cultura românească, lit. "The Critical Mindset in Romanian Culture", Garabet Ibrăileanu depicted Caragiale as standing for the most extreme criticism of Romanian society, together with the more conservative Mihai Eminescu and the more leftist intellectuals associated with the Romanian Social-Democratic Workers' Party. Although he considered Boborul to be a good piece of writing, he accused Caragiale of remaining one-sided: "and [what about] the reactionary attitude, does it never lend itself to ridicule?"

== See also ==
- Liberalism and radicalism in Romania
