= Constantin Stoicescu =

Romanian politician and diplomat

Constantin I. Stoicescu
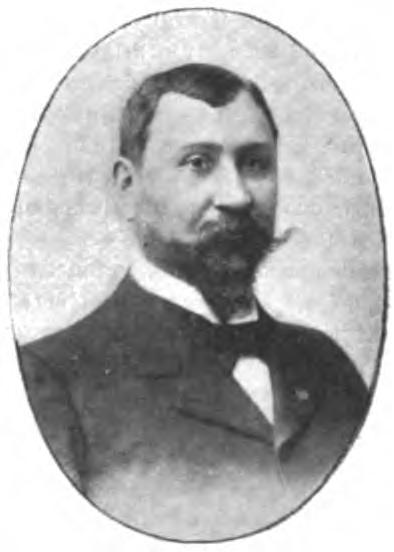

Minister of Public Works
- In office October 4, 1895 – November 21, 1896
- Monarch: Carol I of Romania
- In office July 18, 1902 – November 22, 1902

Minister of Foreign Affairs
- In office November 21, 1896 – March 26, 1897
- Preceded by: Dimitrie Sturdza
- Succeeded by: Dimitrie Sturdza

Minister of Justice
- In office October 1, 1898 – March 30, 1899
- In office February 14, 1901 – July 18, 1902

Minister of Agriculture, Industry, Trade and Property
- In office November 22, 1902 – December 14, 1904

Personal details
- Born: January 15, 1852 Ploiești, Wallachia
- Died: May 10, 1911 (aged 59) Bucharest, Kingdom of Romania

Constantin I. Stoicescu (January 15, 1852 – May 10, 1911) was a politician and diplomat who held several ministerial positions in the Kingdom of Romania.

== Life and political career ==
Stoicescu was born on January 15, 1852, in Ploiești. After completion of a lyceum in Bucharest in 1869, he moved to Paris and completed a degree obtaining a PhD in law in 1876. Once he returned to Romania, Stoicescu took a position of a judge at the Ilfov Tribunal for one year. He was then appointed the post of the first secretary to the Romanian mission in Paris which he held in 1877 - 1878. After returning to Romania, he took a position in the Bucharest Court of Appeals.

In 1881, he became involved in politics by becoming a member of the National Liberal Party. From October 4, 1895, until November 21, 1896, he was the minister of public works within the cabinet of Dimitrie Sturdza. From November 21, 1896, until March 26, 1897, he held the position of the minister of foreign affairs in the cabinet of Petre S. Aurelian, for two terms from October 1, 1898, until March 30, 1899, and from February 14, 1901, until July 18, 1902, as minister of justice. He then was in charge of the Ministry of Public Works again from July 18 until November 22, 1902, and was minister of agriculture, industry, trade and property from November 22, 1902, toh December 14, 1904, in the cabinet of Sturdza.

Stoicescu died on May 10, 1911, in Bucharest.

== See also ==
- Foreign relations of Romania
