= Alexandru Candiano-Popescu =

Romanian general and writer (1841–1901)

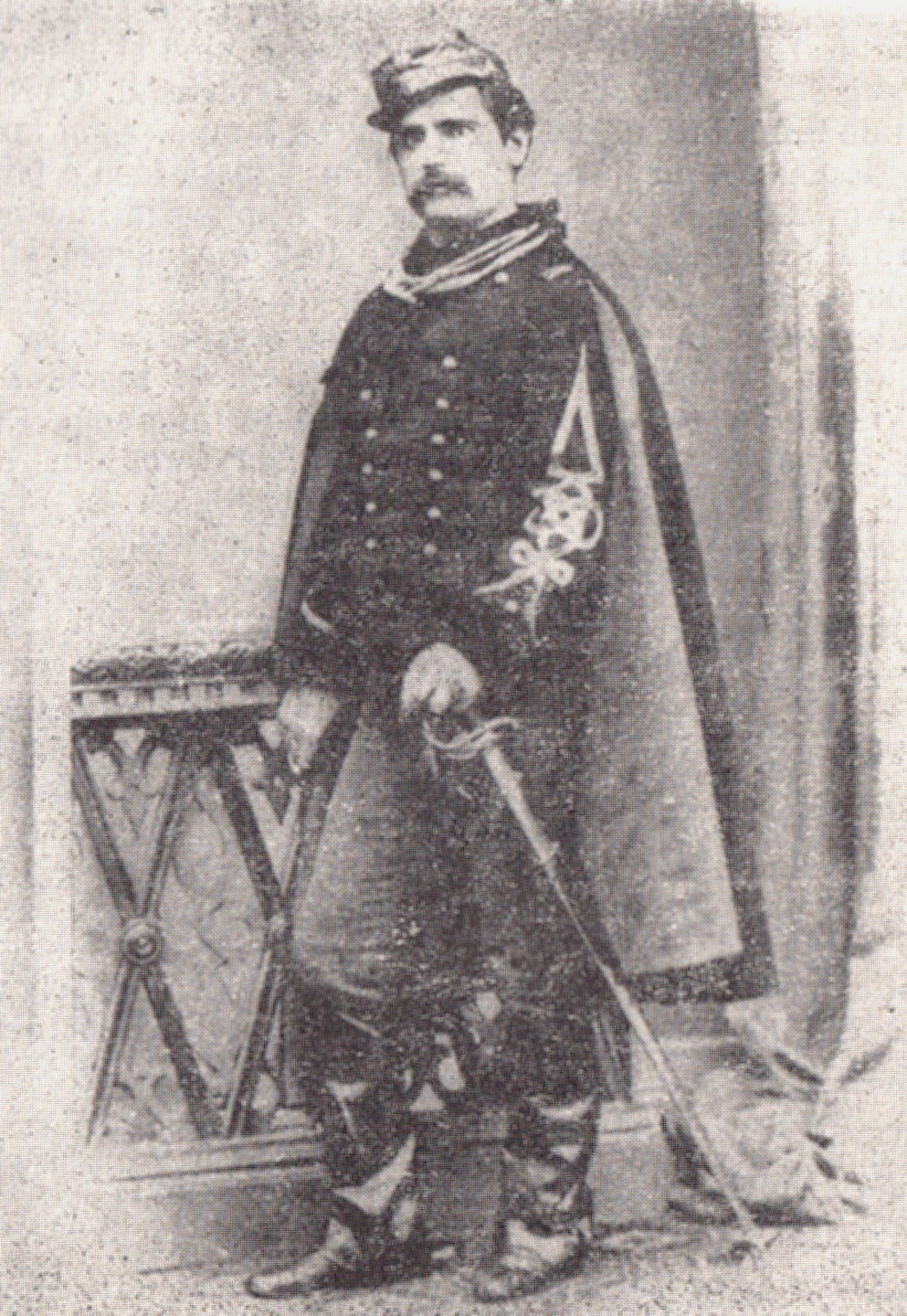
Candiano-Popescu, ca. 1866

Alexandru Candiano-Popescu (Romanian pronunciation: [alekˈsandru kandiˈano poˈpesku]; January 27, 1841 – June 25, 1901) was a Romanian army general, lawyer, journalist, and poet, best known for his role in the Republic of Ploieşti conspiracy.

== Biography ==
He joined the military school in 1854, becoming an artillery sub-lieutenant in 1859. As a captain, he took part in the coup of February 11, 1866, that toppled Alexandru Ioan Cuza, the ruling Domnitor of the United Principalities. In 1867, he resigned from the Romanian Army and started two newspapers: Perseverenţa and Democraţia, in which he supported democratic ideas. Considered a "political agitator", he was arrested three times, including once in Austria-Hungary, where he was imprisoned for several weeks in the fortress of Arad.

In August 1870, he took part in the republican insurrection against the Hohenzollern Domnitor, Carol I, in Ploieşti. The movement was suppressed and he was charged along with 40 other people, but the Târgovişte court of law acquitted them. In his tongue-in-cheek account of the insurrection (Boborul), Ion Luca Caragiale named Candiano-Popescu as "President of the Republic", and claimed that he had appointed several of his collaborators into high office.

In 1877, as the War of Independence against the Ottoman Empire began, Candiano, although he was a deputy in the Romanian Parliament, joined the army to take part in the assault over Grivitsa, being the commander of the 2nd Hunters' Battalion, receiving the Order of St. George from Alexander II, the Emperor of Russia. In 1880, he became Carol's Adjutant, a position he held for 12 years. In 1894, he was named General of Cavalry.

He wrote a volume of poetry, Când n-aveam ce face (1866), and several war songs.
