= Petre S. Aurelian =

Romanian economist, politician and academic

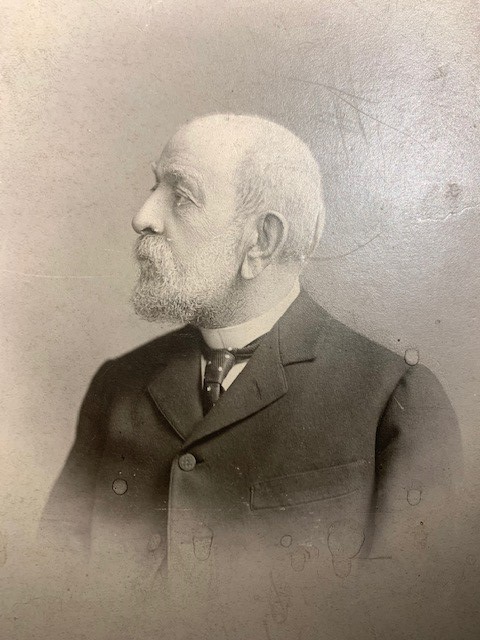
Petre S. Aurelian

Petre Sebeșanu Aurelian, (Romanian pronunciation: [ˈpetre sebeˈʃanu a.ureliˈan]) 13 December 1833 – 24 January 1909, was a Romanian economist, politician and academic. A member of the National Liberal Party (PNL), he served as a Prime Minister of Romania between 2 December 1896 and 12 April 1897.

Born in Slatina on 13 December 1833, he studied at Saint Sava College, Bucharest and then in France at the Superior School of Agronomy of Grignon, where he studied between 1856 and 1860. After he returned to Romania, he became an engineer at the Public Works Ministry and a professor at the Agriculture School of Pantelimon, as well as an editor at the "Monitorul" and "Agronomia" publications. He published the well-known monograph Terra nostra that compared the lower birth rates of Romanian Orthodox to those that were higher among the "Israelites" (Jews in Moldova) and was emphatic that the fate of the Romanian people was at stake.

He was a deputy, a senator, the minister of Public Works (1877–1878 and 1887–1888), of agriculture and of Education (1882–1884).

Aurelian was elected as member of the Romanian Academy in 1871 and was its president between 1896 and 1897. He was awarded the Order of the Star of Romania in the rank of Grand Cross (April 1897) and the Order of the Crown of Romania in the rank of Grand Cross (March 1887). He died in Bucharest on 24 January 1909.
