= List of hierarchs of the Romanian Orthodox Church =

This is the list of the hierarchs of the Romanian Orthodox Church, depicting the organization of the church.

== Hierarchs ==
Romanian Orthodox Church organization until 2009

=== Romanian Patriarchate ===
- Daniel, Patriarch of All Romania, Metropolitan of Wallachia and Dobrudja, Archbishop of Bucharest, Locum Tenens of Caesarea in Cappadocia
  - Patriarchal Vicar – currently Varlaam Ploieșteanul
  - Patriarchal Vicar – currently Paisie Sinaitul

=== Metropolis of Wallachia and Dobrudja ===
==== Archdiocese of Bucharest ====
- Archbishop of Bucharest - Patriarch Daniel
  - Vicar of the Archdiocese of Bucharest – currently Timotei Prahoveanul

==== Archdiocese of Tomis ====
- Archbishop of Tomis – currently Teodosie Petrescu

==== Archdiocese of Târgoviște ====
- Archbishop of Târgoviște – currently Nifon Mihăiță

==== Archdiocese of Argeș and Muscel ====
- Archbishop of Argeș and Muscel – currently Calinic Argatu

==== Archdiocese of Buzău and Vrancea ====
- Archbishop of Buzău and Vrancea – currently Ciprian Spiridon

==== Archdiocese of the Lower Danube ====
- Archbishop of Lower Danube – currently Casian Crăciun

===== Diocese of Slobozia and Călărași =====
- Bishop of Slobozia and Călărași – currently Vincențiu Grifoni

===== Diocese of Alexandria and Teleorman =====
- Bishop of Alexandria and Teleorman – currently Galaction Stângă

===== Diocese of Giurgiu =====
- Bishop of Giurgiu – currently Ambrozie Meleacă

===== Diocese of Tulcea =====
- Bishop of Tulcea – currently Visarion Bălțat

=== Metropolis of Moldavia and Bukovina ===
==== Archdiocese of Iași ====
- Archbishop of Iași and Metropolitan of Moldova and Bukovina – currently Teofan Savu
  - Vicar Bishop – currently Nichifor Botoșăneanul

==== Archdiocese of Suceava and Rădăuți ====
- Archbishop of Suceava and Rădăuți – currently Calinic Dumitriu
  - Vicar Bishop – currently Damaschin Dorneanul

==== Archdiocese of Roman and Bacău ====
- Archbishop of Roman and Bacău – currently Ioachim Giosan
  - Vicar Bishop - currently Teofil Trotușanul

===== Diocese of Huși =====
- Bishop of Huși – currently Ignatie Trif

=== Metropolis of Transylvania ===
==== Archdiocese of Sibiu ====
- Archbishop of Sibiu and Metropolitan of Transylvania – currently Laurențiu Streza
  - Vicar Bishop – currently Ilarion Făgărășanul

==== Archdiocese of Alba Iulia ====
- Archbishop of Alba Iulia – currently Irineu Pop

===== Diocese of Oradea =====
- Bishop of Oradea – currently Sofronie Drincec

===== Diocese of Covasna and Harghita =====
- Bishop of Covasna and Harghita – currently Andrei Moldovan

===== Diocese of Deva and Hunedoara =====
- Bishop of Deva and Hunedoara – currently Nestor Dinculeană
  - Vicar Bishop – currently Gherontie Hunedoreanul

=== Metropolis of Cluj, Maramureș and Sălaj ===
==== Archdiocese of Vad, Feleac and Cluj ====
- Archbishop of Vad, Feleac and Cluj and Metropolitan of Cluj, Maramureș and Sălaj – currently Andrei Andreicuț
  - Vicar Bishop – currently Samuel Bistrițeanul

===== Diocese of Maramureș and Sătmar =====
- Bishop of Maramureș and Sătmar – currently Iustin Hodea
  - Vicar Bishop – currently Timotei Sătmăreanul

===== Diocese of Sălaj =====
- Bishop of Sălaj – currently Benedict Vesa

=== Metropolis of Oltenia ===
==== Archdiocese of Craiova ====
- Archbishop of Craiova and Metropolitan of Oltenia – currently Irineu Popa

==== Archdiocese of Râmnic ====
- Archbishop of Râmnic – currently Varsanufie Gogescu

===== Diocese of Severin and Strehaia =====
- Bishop of Severin and Strehaia – currently Nicodim Nicolăescu

===== Diocese of Slatina and Romanați =====
- Bishop of Slatina – currently Sebastian Pașcanu

=== Metropolis of Banat ===
==== Archdiocese of Timișoara ====
- Archbishop of Timișoara and Metropolitan of Banat – currently Ioan Selejan
  - Vicar Bishop – currently Paisie Lugojanul

==== Archdiocese of Arad ====
- Archbishop of Arad – currently Timotei Seviciu
  - Vicar- Bishop – currently vacant

===== Diocese of Caransebeș =====
- Bishop of Caransebeș – currently Lucian Mic

== Diaspora ==
=== Metropolis of Bessarabia ===
==== Archdiocese of Chișinău ====
- Archbishop of Chișinău and Metropolitan of Bessarabia – currently Antonie Telembici
  - Vicar Bishop – currently Nectarie de Bogdania

===== Diocese of Bălți (former Diocese of Hotin) =====
- Bishop of Bălți – currently vacant

===== Diocese of Southern Bessarabia (former Diocese of Cetatea Albă-Ismail) =====
- Bishop of Southern Bessarabia – currently Veniamin Goreanu

===== Diocese of Dubasari and all Transnistria =====
- Bishop of Dubasari – currently vacant

=== Romanian Orthodox Metropolis of Western and Southern Europe ===
==== Romanian Orthodox Archdiocese of Western Europe ====
- Romanian Orthodox Archbishop of Western Europe and Romanian Orthodox Metropolitan of Western and Southern Europe – currently Iosif Pop
  - Vicar Bishop – currently Marc Nemțeanul

==== Romanian Orthodox Archdiocese of Great Britain ====
- Romanian Orthodox Archbishop of Great Britain - currently Atanasie Rusnac

===== Diocese of Italy =====
- Bishop of Italy – currently Siluan Șpan
  - Vicar Bishop - currently Maxim Danubianul

===== Diocese of Spain and Portugal =====
- Bishop of Spain and Portugal – currently Timotei Lauran
  - Vicar Bishop – currently Teofil de Iberia

====== Diocese of Ireland and Iceland ======
- Romanian Orthodox Bishop of Ireland and Iceland – currently Nectarie Petre

=== Metropolis of Germany, Central and Northern Europe ===
==== Archdiocese of Germany, Austria and Luxemburg ====
- Archbishop of Germany, Austria and Luxemburg and Metropolitan of Germany, Central and Northern Europe – currently Serafim Joantă
  - Vicar Bishop – currently Sofian Brașoveanul

===== Diocese of Northern Europe =====
- Bishop of Northern Europe – currently Macarie Drăgoi

=== Metropolis of the Two Americas ===
==== Archdiocese of the United States of America ====
- Archbishop of the United States of America and Metropolitan of the Two Americas – currently Nicolae Condrea

===== Diocese of Canada =====
- Bishop of Canada – currently Ioan Casian Tunaru

== Entities under the direct coordination of the Romanian Patriarchy ==
=== Diocese of Dacia Felix ===
- Bishop of Dacia Felix – currently Ieronim Crețu

=== Diocese of Hungary ===
- Romanian Orthodox Bishop of Hungary – currently Siluan Mănuilă

=== Romanian Orthodox Diocese of Australia and New Zealand ===
- Bishop of Australia and New Zealand – currently Mihail Filimon
  - Vicar Bishop - currently Iachint de Pacific

== See also ==
- List of Patriarchs of All Romania
- Prelate ranks: Patriarch, Metropolitan, Archbishop, Bishop
- Apostolic succession
- Episcopal polity
- Eastern Orthodox Church organization
