= Pan-Orthodox Council =

2016 Eastern Orthodox synod

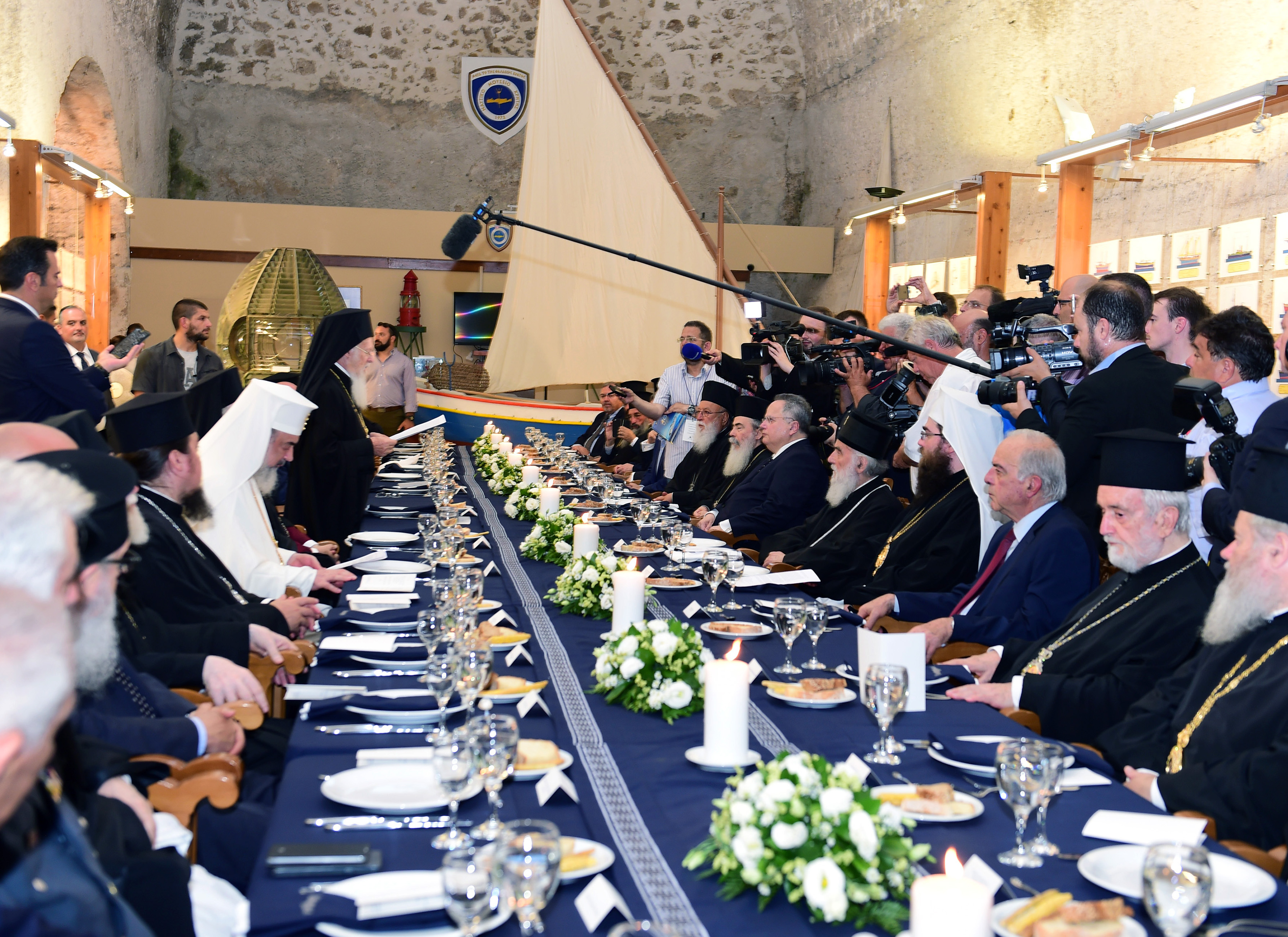
The Pan-Orthodox Council, Kolymvari, Crete, Greece, June 2016

The Pan-Orthodox Council, officially referred to as the Holy and Great Council of the Orthodox Church (Ancient Greek: Ἁγία καὶ Μεγάλη Σύνοδος τῆς Ὀρθοδόξου Ἐκκλησίας; also sometimes called the Council of Crete), was a synod of set representative bishops of the universally recognised autocephalous local churches of the Eastern Orthodox Church held in Kolymvari, Crete. The Council sat from 19 to 26 June 2016.

== Preparations ==
In March 2014, the Primates of local Orthodox Churches convened in Fener, the residence of the Ecumenical Patriarch Bartholomew I, and reached a decision: "The Holy and Great Council of the Orthodox Church will be convened by the Ecumenical Patriarch in Constantinople in 2016, unless something unexpected occurs."

In January 2016, at the invitation of the Ecumenical Patriarch Bartholomew, the Synaxis of Primates of the Orthodox Autocephalous Churches was held at the Orthodox Center of the Ecumenical Patriarchate in Chambésy, Switzerland. The Primates of the local Orthodox Churches and three official delegations representing the Church of Antioch, the Church of Greece, and the Church of Poland, convened to finalise the texts for the Holy and Great Council. Due to the heightened tensions between Russia and Turkey, a decision was reached to hold the Synod in Greece.

== Agenda, decisions and reception ==
The items officially approved at the 2016 Synaxis for referral to and adoption by the Holy and Great Council were:

- The Mission of the Orthodox Church in Today's World;
- The Orthodox Diaspora;
- Autonomy and the Means by Which it is Proclaimed;
- The Sacrament of Marriage and its Impediments;
- The Importance of Fasting and Its Observance Today;
- Relations of the Orthodox Church with the Rest of the Christian World.

Elizabeth Prodromou, an American professor who was on the team advising Patriarch Bartholomew at the Council, stated that the Council would enable the Orthodox church to express a "robust theology of global engagement".

The Council in Crete approved, with minor amendments, the documents that had been elaborated by all the Churches in the course of their consultations prior to the Synod, and adopted the Message and the Encyclical.

In view of non-attendance by the four Churches, the Synod's official spokesman Archbishop Job Getcha stated that all the documents adopted by the Council in Crete would be binding to all the Orthodox Churches.

On 27 June 2016, the Synod of the Church of Antioch issued a statement concerning the Crete Council that stated that the documents adopted by in Crete were not binding for the Patriarchate of Antioch; the Church of Antioch recognized the Synod as "a preliminary gathering on the way to a Pan-Orthodox Council", while the documents it adopted as not final and open for discussion.

The Synod of the Russian Church (the Moscow Patriarchate) in July 2016 passed a resolution that designated the Crete Council as "an important event in the history of the synodal process in the Orthodox Church that was begun by the First Pan-Orthodox consultation in Rhodes in 1961", but the Russian Church Synod refused to recognise the Synod as pan-orthodox and the documents thereof as "reflecting pan-orthodox consensus". The Russian Church Synod decided to have the Crete Synod's documents examined for further conclusions. In early December 2017, the Bishops′ Council of the ROC approved the previous resolution of the ROC Synod that stated that the ROC did not recognise the Council in Crete as Pan-Orthodox, nor its decisions binding for all the Orthodox Churches.

On 18 November 2016, Ecumenical Patriarch Bartholomew I of Constantinople sent a letter to the Archbishop of Athens asking him to admonish some of the Greek Orthodox clergy who reject the Holy and Great Council. According to the document, Patriarch Bartholomew reserved to himself the right to sever ecclesiastical and sacramental communion with those clergymen if Greek ecclesiastical authorities decide not to act on the patriarch's request to discipline them. As Dr. Ines Murzaku, professor of Ecclesiastical History and Founding Chair of the Department of Catholic Studies at Seton Hall University, elaborated in her email interview to Crisis Magazine, such "interference and pressure to excommunicate might sound more as rules/jurisdiction that apply in the West“, and for this reason the Patriarch Bartholomew "might be viewed by many as ‘the Pope of the East’ or ‘Orthodox Pope’”.

However, Ludwig Hertling disagrees. He says in his book, Communio: Church and Papacy in Early Christianity, that anyone could and did break communion when the parties felt necessary. The most prominent example is the excommunications between Patriarch Michael Kerularios and Cardinal Humbert (a representative of Pope Leo, but not Leo himself) when the latter excommunicated the former. That is still practiced in the Church today. The Patriarch's request for admonishment concerning the clerics in question is not based on their rejection of the Council per se, since others also disagree, but with the manner they conduct their activities as well as their allegations and charges, including that of heresy (both type of actions denounced by the Holy Synods of other autocephalous Churches).

== Participants and delegations ==
=== Churches that attended ===
Church of Constantinople
- Ecumenical Patriarch Bartholomew (Archontonis), President of the Holy and Great Council.
- Archbishop Leo (Makkonen) of Karelia and all Finland.
- Metropolitan Stephanos (Charalambides) of Tallinn and all Estonia.
- Metropolitan Elder John (Zizioulas) of Pergamon.
- Archbishop Elder Demetrios (Trakatellis) of America.
- Metropolitan Augustine (Labardakis) of Germany.
- Archbishop Irenaeus (Athanasiadis) of Crete.
- Metropolitan Isaiah (Chronopoulos) of Denver.
- Metropolitan Alexios (Panagiotopoulos) of Atlanta.
- Metropolitan Iakovos (Sophroniadis) of the Princes’ Islands.
- Metropolitan Joseph (Charkiolakis) of Prikonnisos.
- Metropolitan Meliton (Karras) of Philadelphia.
- Metropolitan Emmanuel (Adamakis) of France.
- Metropolitan Nikitas (Lulias) of the Dardanelles.
- Metropolitan Nicholas (Pissaris) of Detroit.
- Metropolitan Gerasimos (Michaleas) of San Francisco.
- Metropolitan Amphilochios (Andronikakis) of Kissamos and Selini.
- Metropolitan Ambrosios (Zografos) of Korea.
- Metropolitan Maximos (Vgenopoulos) of Selyvria.
- Metropolitan Amphilochios (Stergios) of Adrianopolis.
- Metropolitan Kallistos (Ware) of Diokleia.
- Metropolitan Antony (Scharba) of Ierapolis, head of the Ukrainian Orthodox in the USA.
- Archbishop Job (Getcha) of Telmessos, Permanent Representative of the Ecumenical Patriarchate to the World Council of Churches.
- Archbishop Jean (Renneteau) of Charioupolis, head of the Patriarchal Exarchate of Orthodox Parishes of Russian Tradition in Western Europe.
- Bishop Gregory (Tatsis) of Nyssa, head of the Carpatho-Russian Orthodox in the USA.
- Special Consultants:
  - Bishop Makarios of Christopolis (Estonia).
  - Archimandrite Tikhon, Abbot of Stavronikita Monastery of Mount Athos.
  - Protopresbyter of the Ecumenical Throne Konstantinos Myron (Germany).
  - Sister Theoxeni, Abbess of the Holy Patriarchal and Stavropegic Monastery of the Life-Giving Spring (Chrysopigi (gr)), Chania.
  - Mr. Panteleimon Vingas, Archon Grand Chartophylax of the Holy and Great Church of Christ (Constantinople).
  - Dr. Elizabeth Prodromou, Professor (USA).
  - Archimandrite Bartholomew Samaras, Chief-Secretary of the Holy and Sacred Council of the Ecumenical Patriarchate and Secretary to the Holy and Great Council’s President.
Church of Alexandria
- Patriarch Theodore II (Choreftakis), Pope and Patriarch of Alexandria and All Africa.
- Metropolitan Elder Petros (Giakoumelos) of Aksum.
- Metropolitan Elder Gabriel (Raftopulos) of Leontopolis.
- Metropolitan Makarios (Tillyrides) of Nairobi and All Kenya.
- Metropolitan Jonah (Lwanga) of Kampala and All Uganda.
- Metropolitan Seraphim (Iakóvou) of Zimbabwe and Angola
- Metropolitan Alexandros (Gianniris) of Nigeria.
- Metropolitan Theophylaktos (Tzoumerkas) of Tripoli.
- Metropolitan Sergios (Kykkotis) of Good Hope.
- Metropolitan Athanasios (Kykkotis) of Cyrene.
- Metropolitan Alexios (Leontaritis) of Carthage.
- Metropolitan Ieronymos (Muzeeyi) of Mwanza.
- Metropolitan George (Vladimirou) of Guinea.
- Metropolitan Nicholas (Antoniou) of Hermopolis.
- Metropolitan Dimitrios (Zaharengas) of Irinopolis.
- Metropolitan Damaskinos (Papandreou) of Johannesburg and Pretoria.
- Metropolitan Narkissos (Gammoh) of Accra.
- Metropolitan Emmanuel (Kagias) of Ptolemaidos.
- Metropolitan Gregorios (Stergiou) of Cameroon and Exarch of Central Africa.
- Metropolitan Nicodemos (Priangellos) of Memphis.
- Metropolitan Meletios (Kamiloudes) of Katanga.
- Bishop Panteleimon (Arathymos) of Brazzaville and Gabon.
- Bishop Innokentios (Biakatonta) of Burudi and Rwanda.
- Bishop Crysostomos (Karagounis) of Mozambique.
- Bishop Neofytos (Kongai) of Nyeri and Mount Kenya.
- Special Consultants:
  - Dr. Panagiotis Tzoumerkas, Professor, University Ecclesiastical Academy of Thessaloniki.
  - Archimandrite Paisios (Larentzakis).
  - Archimandrite Peter (Parginos).
  - Protopresbyter Athenodoros Papaevropiadis.
  - Protopresbyter Joseph Kwame Labi Ayete.
  - Deacon Emmanuel Kamanua.
Church of Jerusalem
- Patriarch Theophilos (Giannopoulos) III, of Jerusalem.
- Metropolitan Benedict (Tsekouras) of Philadelphia.
- Archbishop Aristarchos (Peristeris) of Constantina.
- Archbishop Theophylaktos (Georgiadis) of Jordan.
- Archbishop Nektarios (Selalmadzidis) of Anthedon.
- Archbishop Philoumenos (Machamre) of Pella.
- Special Consultants:
  - Archimandrite Christophoros (Mousa).
  - Archimandrite Damianos (Panou).
  - Archimandrite Nikodemos (Skrettas).
  - Archimandrite Chrysostomos (Nasis).
  - Archimandrite Ieronymos (Delioglou).
  - Protopresbyter Georgios Dragas.
  - Professor Theodoros Yiangou.
Serbian Orthodox Church
- On June 9, 2016, the Serbian Orthodox Church joined a number of local Churches which did not consider participation in the Pan-Orthodox Council slated for late June on Crete to be possible. However on June 15, 2016, the Serbian Church changed its position on the issue of its participation in the Pan-Orthodox Council and decided to attend, with the caveat that it reserved the right to leave forum on Crete if the position of those churches who refused to participate was ignored.
  - Serbian Patriarch Irinej (Gavrilović), the Archbishop of Peć, Metropolitan of Belgrade and Karlovci.
  - Archbishop Jovan VI (Vraniškovski) of Ohrid and Skopje,
  - Metropolitan Amfilohije (Radović) of Montenegro and the Littoral,
  - Metropolitan Porfirije (Perić) of Zagreb and Ljubljana,
  - Bishop Vasilije (Vadić) of Syrmia,
  - Bishop Lukijan (Pantelić) of Buda,
  - Bishop Longin (Krčo) of New Gračanica – Midwestern America,
  - Bishop Irinej (Bulović) of Bačka,
  - Bishop Hrizostom (Jević) of Zvornik and Tuzla,
  - Bishop Justin (Stefanović) of Žiča,
  - Bishop Pahomije (Gačić) of Vranje,
  - Bishop Jovan (Mladenović) of Šumadija,
  - Bishop Ignatije (Midić) of Braničevo,
  - Bishop Fotije (Sladojević) of Dalmatia,
  - Bishop Atanasije (Rakita) of Bihać and Petrovac,
  - Bishop Joanikije (Mićović) of Budimlja and Nikšić,
  - Bishop Grigorije (Durić) of Zahumlje and Hercegovina,
  - Bishop Milutin (Knežević) of Valjevo,
  - Bishop Maxim (Vasiljević) of Western America,
  - Bishop Irinej (Dobrijević) of Australia and New Zealand,
  - Bishop David (Perović) of Kruševac,
  - Bishop Jovan (Ćulibrk) of Slavonia,
  - Bishop Andrej (Ćilerdžić) of Austria and Switzerland,
  - Bishop Sergije (Karanović) of Frankfurt and all Germany,
  - Bishop Ilarion (Golubović) of Timok.
  - Special Consultants:
  - Bishop Jeronim (Močević) of Jegra,
  - Archimandrite Sava (Janjić) of the Visoki Dečani monastery,
  - Archimandrite Nikodim (Kosović) of the Krka monastery,
  - Protopresbyter-stavrophore Dr. Zoran Krstić,
  - Protopresbyter Gaja Gajić,
  - Mr. Vladan Tatalović, Assistant Professor at the University of Belgrade Faculty of Orthodox Theology.
Church of Romania
- Patriarch Daniel (Ciobotea), of the Romanian Orthodox Church.
- Archbishop Teofan (Savu), of Iași, and Metropolitan of Moldavia and Bucovina.
- Archbishop Laurențiu (Streza), of Sibiu, and Metropolitan of Transylvania.
- Archbishop Andrei (Andreicuț), of Vad, Feleacu and Cluj, and Metropolitan of Cluj, Maramureș and Sălaj.
- Archbishop Irineu (Popa), of Craiova, and Metropolitan of Oltenia.
- Archbishop Ioan (Selejan), of Timișoara, and Metropolitan of Banat.
- Archbishop Iosif (Pop), of Western Europe, and Metropolitan of Western and Southern Europe.
- Archbishop Serafim (Joantă), of Germany, Austria and Luxembourg, and Metropolitan of Germany, Central and Northern Europe.
- Archbishop Nifon (Mihăiță), Metropolitan of Târgoviște.
- Archbishop Irineu (Pop) of Alba Iulia.
- Archbishop Varsanufie (Gogescu) of Râmnic.
- Archbishop Ioachim (Giosanu) of Roman and Bacău.
- Archbishop Casian (Crăciun) of Lower Danube.
- Archbishop Timotei (Seviciu) of Arad.
- Archbishop Nicolae (Condrea) in the Americas.
- Bishop Sofronie (Drincec) of Oradea.
- Bishop Nicodim (Nicolăescu) of Severin and Strehaia.
- Bishop Visarion (Bălțat) of Tulcea.
- Bishop Petroniu (Florea) of Sălaj.
- Bishop Siluan (Mănuilă) of Hungary and Serbia.
- Bishop Siluan (Șpan) of Italy.
- Bishop Timotei (Lauran) of Spain and Portugal.
- Bishop Macarie (Drăgoi) of Northern Europe.
- Bishop Varlaam (Merticariu) of Ploiești, Assistant Bishop to the Patriarch, Secretary of the Holy Council.
- Bishop Emilian (Nica) of Loviște, Assistant Bishop to the Archdiocese of Râmnic.
Church of Cyprus
- Archbishop Chrysostomos II (Dimitriou) of Nova Justiniana and All Cyprus.
- Metropolitan Georgios (Papachrysostomou) of Paphos and Exarchate of Arsinoe and Romaeon.
- Metropolitan Chrysostomos (Mahairiotis) of Kition and Exarchate of Larnaca and Pano Lefkara.
- Metropolitan Chrysostomos (Kykkotis) of Kyrenia and Exarchate of Lapithos and Karavas.
- Metropolitan Athanasios (Nikolaou) of Limassol, Amathous and Kourion.
- Metropolitan Vasileios (Karajiannis) of Constantia and Ammochostos.
- Metropolitan Nikiphoros (Kykkotis) of Kykkos and Tillyria.
- Metropolitan Isaïas (Kykkotis) of Tamassos and Oreini.
- Metropolitan Barnabas (Stavrovouniotis) of Tremithousa and Lefkara.
- Bishop Christophoros (Tsiakkas) of Karpasion.
- Bishop Nektarios (Spyrou) of Arsinoe.
- Bishop Nikolaos (Timiadis) of Amathus.
- Bishop Epiphanios (Mahairiotis) of Ledra.
- Bishop Leontios (Englistriotis) of Chytron.
- Bishop Porphyrios (Mahairiotis) of Neapolis.
- Bishop Gregory (Hatziouraniou) of Mesaoria.
- Special Consultants:
  - Archimandrite Ioannis (Ioannou), Igumen of Monastery of St. Barnabas.
  - Archimandrite Benedict (Ioannou), Director of St. Barnabas Seminary.
  - Archimandrite Papagrigorios (Ioannidis).
  - Archimandrite Gregory (Mousouroulis).
  - Archimandrite Augustinos (Kkaras).
  - Deacon Cyprian Kountouris.
  - Deacon Michael Nicholaou.
  - Mr. Michael Spyrou, Secretary of the Holy Council.
Church of Greece
- A Greek media report of May 24, 2016 stated that at least a dozen bishops who had been appointed to participate in the Holy and Great Council said that they refused to attend. The specific prelates were to be replaced by other metropolitans at an urgently convened summit of the hierarchy of the Church of Greece. The original list of participants was published on March 8, 2016. The final delagtion that attended the Synod included the following:
  - Archbishop Ieronymos II (Liapis) of Athens.
  - Metropolitan Prokopios (Tsakoumakas) of Philippi, Neapolis and Thasos.
  - Metropolitan Chrysostomos (Zaphiris) of Peristeri.
  - Metropolitan Germanos (Paraskevopoulos) of Elis and Oleni.
  - Metropolitan Alexandros (Papadopoulos) of Mantineia and Kynouria.
  - Metropolitan Ignatios (Alexiou) of Arta.
  - Metropolitan Ignatios (Lappas) of Larissa and Tyrnavos.
  - Metropolitan Damaskinos (Karpathakis) of Didymoteichon and Orestias and Exarchate of Haemimontos.
  - Metropolitan Alexios (Vryonis) of Nikaia.
  - Metropolitan Hierotheos (Vlachos) of Metropolis of Nafpaktos and Agios Vlasios.
  - Metropolitan Eusebios (Pistolís) of Samos and Ikaria.
  - Metropolitan Seraphim (Papakóstas) of Kastoria and Exarchate of Upper Macedonia.
  - Metropolitan Ignatios (Georgakopoulos) of Demetrias and Almyros.
  - Metropolitan Nikodemos (Korakis) of Kassandria and Exarchate of All the Thermaic Gulf.
  - Metropolitan Ephraem (Stenakis) of Hydra, Spetses and Aegina.
  - Metropolitan Theologos (Apostolides) of Serres and Nigrita.
  - Metropolitan Makarios (Philotheou) of Siderokastron.
  - Metropolitan Anthimos (Koukouridis) of Alexandroupoli.
  - Metropolitan Varnavas (Tyris) of Neapolis and Stavroupolis.
  - Metropolitan Chrysostomos (Savvatos) of Messinia.
  - Metropolitan Athenagoras (Dikaiakos) of Ilion, Acharnes and Petroupolis.
  - Metropolitan Ioannis (Tassias) of Langadas.
  - Metropolitan Gabriel (Papanicolaou) of New Ionia and Philadelphia.
  - Metropolitan Chrysostomos (Tsirigas) of Nikopolis and Preveza and Exarchate of Old Epirus.
  - Metropolitan Theoklitos (Athanasópoulos) of Ierissos, Mount Athos and Ardameri.
  - Special Consultants:
  - Bishop Clement (Kotsomytis) of Methoni, Chief Secretary of the Holy Council.
  - Archimandrite Ignatius (Sotiriades), Secretary, Inter-Orthodox Relations.
  - Archimandrite Cherubim (Moustakas), Assistant, Inter-Orthodox Relations.
  - Protopresbyter Adamantios Augoustidis, General Vicar of the Holy Archdiocese of Athens, Associate Professor of Theology, University of Athens.
  - Protopresbyter Basil Kalliakmanis, Professor of Theology School of Thessaloniki.
  - Mr. George Filias, Professor of Theology, University of Athens.
Church of Poland
- Metropolitan Sawa (Hrycuniak) of Warsaw and All Poland.
- Archbishop Szymon (Romańczuk) of Łódź and Poznań.
- Archbishop Jeremiasz (Anchimiuk) of Wrocław and Szczecin.
- Archbishop Abel (Popławski) of Lublin and Chełm.
- Archbishop Jakub (Kostiuczuk) of Białystok and Gdańsk.
- Bishop Jerzy (Pańkowski) of Siemiatycze.
- Bishop Paisjusz (Martyniuk) of Gorlice.
- Special Consultants:
  - Archimandrite Andreas.
  - Archpriest Anatol Szymaniuk.
  - Archpriest Andrzej Kuźma.
  - Archdeacon Paweł Tokajuk.
  - Mr. Jarosław Charkiewicz, journalist.
  - Mr. Jerzy Betlejko, interpreter.
  - Mr. Mikołaj Podolec, interpreter, steward.
Church of Albania
- Archbishop Anastasios (Yannoulatos) of Tirana, Durrës and All Albania.
- Metropolitan Ignati (Trianti) of Berat, Vlorë and Kanina.
- Metropolitan Joan (Pelushi) of Korça.
- Metropolitan Dhimitri (Ntigkbasanis) of Gjirokastra.
- Metropolitan Nikolla (Hyka) of Apollonia and Fier.
- Metropolitan Andon (Merdani) of Elbasan, Shpat and Librazhd.
- Metropolitan Nathanail (Stergiou) of Amantia.
- Bishop Asti (Bakallbashi) of Bylis.
- Special Consultants:
  - Protopresbyter Jani Trebicka.
  - Father Anastasios Bendo.
  - Nun Rakela Dervishi.
  - Mr. Piro Kondili.
  - Dr. Dion (Vasil) Tushi.
  - Mrs. Sonila Rëmbeci (former member of the Presidency, and of the Central Council of the CEC, 2009-2013).
  - Mr. Orfea Beci (Press Office).
  - Father Charalampos Gkiokas (Staff of the Archbishop).
  - Deacon Spiros Topanxha (Staff of the Archbishop).
Church of Czech Lands and Slovakia
- Archbishop Rastislav (Gont) of Prešov, the Czech Lands and Slovakia.
- Archbishop Michal (Dandár) of Prague.
- Bishop Isaiah (Slaninka) of Šumperk.
- Special Consultants:
  - Archpriest Milan Gerka, Secretary of the Holy Council.
  - Archimandrite Seraphim (Šemjatovský).
  - Archpriest Michal Švajko.
  - Archdeacon Maxim Durila.
  - Deacon Kiril Sarkissian.
  - Ms Iveta Stacova (interpreter).

=== Churches that did not attend ===
==== Church of Antioch ====
The Antiochian Church pulled out due to the dispute over the ecclesiastical jurisdiction of Qatar that is also claimed by the Patriarchate of Jerusalem.

The Antiochian Church joined the Church of Georgia in their reservations toward the pre-conciliar document about marriage, and also disagreed with the document about the Orthodox diaspora. There were other matters which the Antiochian Church desired to discuss, such as the calendar issue, but had been removed from the agenda due to lack of consensus on the issue.

Still desiring to convene a Pan-Orthodox Council with full participation, the Antiochian Church considers the 2016 meeting to be "a preliminary meeting towards the Pan-Orthodox Council, [and thus considers] its documents not final, but still open to discussion and amendment upon the convocation of the Great Pan-Orthodox Council in the presence and participation of all the Autocephalous Orthodox Churches."

==== Russian Church ====
The Russian Orthodox Church pulled out because of her belief that the council is not truly "pan-orthodox" without the Antiochan, Bulgarian, or Georgian churches. Previously, a preliminary discussion was held on the composition of the delegation to the Pan-Orthodox Council, and the list of participants was published. (Note: The delegation of the Church of Russia that had been approved on May 4 had included the following bishops: Patriarch Kirill of Moscow.; Metropolitan Onufriy (Berezovsky), of Kyiv and All Ukraine.; Metropolitan Juvenal (Poyarkov) of Krutitsy and Kolomna.; Metropolitan Vladimir (Cantarean) of Kishinev and All Moldavia.; Metropolitan Alexander (Mogilyov) of Astana and Kazakhstan, head of the Metropolitan Region in the Republic of Kazakhstan.; Metropolitan Vincent (Morar) of Tashkent and Uzbekistan, head of the Central Asia Metropolitan Region.; Metropolitan Barsanuphius (Sudakov) of St Petersburg and Ladoga, Chancellor of the Moscow Patriarchate.; Metropolitan Paul (Ponomaryov) of Minsk and Zaslavl, Patriarchal Exarch for All Belarus.; Metropolitan Hilarion (Alfeyev) of Volokolamsk, head of the Moscow Patriarchate department for external church relations.; Metropolitan Agathangel (Savin) of Odesa and Izmail.; Metropolitan Aleksandrs Kudrjašovs of Riga and All Latvia.; Metropolitan Tikhon (Yemelyanov) of Novosibirsk and Berdsk.; Metropolitan Sergius (Gensitsky) of Ternopil and Kremenets.; Metropolitan Сyril (Nakonechny) of Yekaterinburg and Verkhoturye.; Metropolitan Mercurius (Ivanov) of Rostov and Novocherkassk.; Metropolitan Mitrophan (Yourchuk) of Luhansk and Alchevsk, chairman of the Ukrainian Orthodox Church department for external church relations.; Metropolitan George (Danilov) of Niznniy Novrogod and Arzamas.; Metropolitan Anthony (Pakanych) of Borispol and Brovary, chancellor of the Ukrainian Orthodox Church.; Archbishop Mark (Arndt) of Berlin-Germany and Great Britain.; Archbishop Innocent (Vasilyev) of Vilna and Lithuania.; Archbishop Gurius (Apalko) of Novogrudok and Slonim.; Archbishop Seraphim (Tsujie) of Sendai.; Archbishop John (Pavlikhin) of Magadan and Sinegorye.; Archbishop Lazar (Gurkin) of Narva and Prichudje.; Bishop Anthony (Sevryuk) of Bogorodsk.)

In 2007 the Moscow and Constantinople patriarchates disagreed at the Joint International Commission for Theological Dialogue Between the Catholic Church and the Orthodox Church over the issue of the Eastern Orthodoxy in Estonia. Metropolitan Stephanos, the primate of the Constantinople-backed Estonian church attended with the Ecumenical Patriarch's Constantinopolitan delegation; Metropolitan Cornelius of the Russia-backed Estonian Church was not listed among the prospective Russian delegation.

==== Church of Bulgaria ====
The Bulgarian Orthodox Church pulled out due to disagreements on some of the texts already approved for the Synod meeting, and specifically that those texts would not be subject to editing in the course of discussions.

==== Church of Georgia ====
The Georgian Orthodox Church pulled out due to disagreements about several of the Synod's documents, in particular "The Relation of the Orthodox Church with the Rest of the Christian World".

In December 2016 the holy synod of the Church of Georgia rejected the claim that the council, which it refers to as the "Council of Crete", was pan-Orthodox and the idea that its texts reflected Orthodox teaching.

==== Orthodox Church in America ====
The Orthodox Church in America (OCA) was not invited due to the lack of recognition of her autocephaly by some other autocephalous churches. However, the jurisdiction did support the Council and its convocation by sending clergy scholars from among them to help with the event before, during, and after. In addition, she released an official letter in support of the Council and a special prayer to be included during every Divine Liturgy in every diocese. Also, OCA scholars were among the drafters of a special letter sent to every autocephalous Church urging them to support the convocation of the Council during the time when critical voices were pressuring certain Churches to not attend the synod just a few days before it was to meet. However, the OCA has not released a post-Council statement, and Metropolitan Tikhon has been in the process of resuming the discussion between the OCA and the Ecumenical Patriarchate.

=== Ecumenical observers ===
A total of 15 observers from non-Orthodox churches attended the council, including the Catholic cardinal Kurt Koch, chairman of the Vatican's Pontifical Council for Promoting Christian Unity, and were greeted by Patriarch Bartholomew at the final liturgy.
