= Diocese of Dacia Felix =

Romanian Orthodox diocese in Serbia

Diocese of Dacia Felix Episcopia Daciei Felix Епархија Дакија Феликс
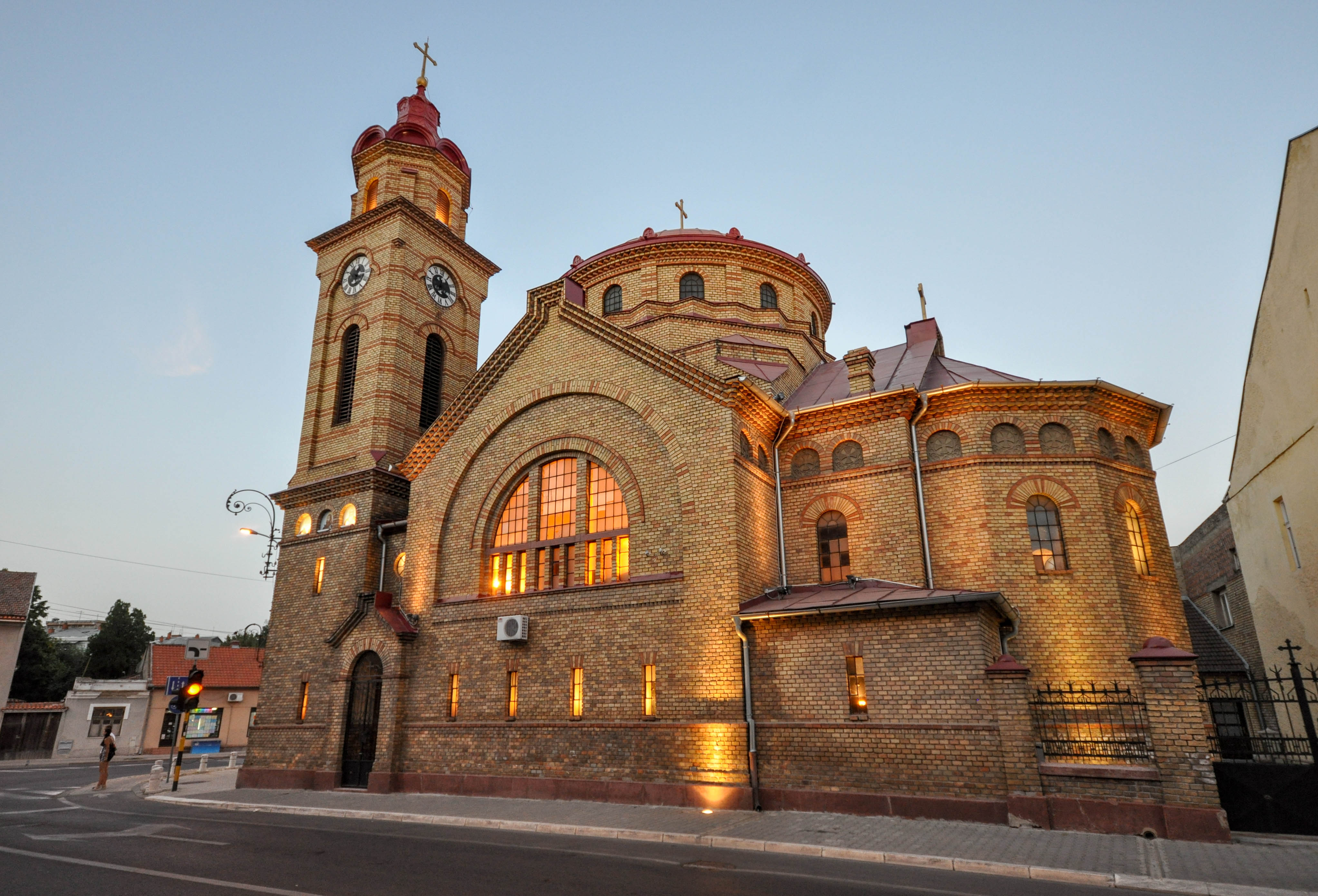
- The Cathedral of the Ascension of the Lord, under the diocese's jurisdiction, in Vršac

Location
- Country: Serbia
- Territory: Banat, Timok Valley
- Headquarters: Deta (official); Vršac (administrative)
- Denomination: Romanian Orthodox

Current leadership
- Bishop: Ieronim Crețu

Map
- Dioceses of the Romanian Orthodox Church with the Diocese of Dacia Felix in the lower left corner (southwest)

The Diocese of Dacia Felix (Romanian: Episcopia Daciei Felix; Serbian: Епархија Дакија Феликс, romanized: Eparhija Dakija Feliks) is a diocese of the Romanian Orthodox Church that has jurisdiction specifically over the ethnic Romanians in Serbia (including the Timok Vlachs).

== History ==
In 1971, the Romanian parishes in the Serbian Banat were merged into a vicariate, the center of which was Vršac (Romanian: Vârșeț) in Serbia, and which was part of the Metropolis of Banat. This vicariate would later be ascended to the Diocese of Dacia Felix in 1997. The city of Deta in Romania was chosen as its official center, while Vršac remained as the administrative headquarters.

In the early 2000s, the diocese began to expand its influence over the Timok Valley, a region that the Serbian Orthodox Church considers its own. On 31 March 2001, Daniil Stoenescu became the bishop of the diocese. In 2005, the first temple in the Timok Valley with services performed in Romanian was built. Serbian authorities viewed it as illegal and attempted to demolish it, but did not do so due to external pressure. The diocese was withdrawn from the Metropolis of Banat in 2009 to be directly subordinate to the Patriarch of All Romania. On 1 August 2017, Siluan Mănuilă, bishop of the Diocese of Gyula in Hungary, became leader of the diocese due to health problems of Stoenescu. He was replaced on 5 July 2022 by Ieronim Crețu, who became the new head of the diocese.

== See also ==
- Roman Dacia, also known as Dacia Felix
