= Patriarch Nicodim of Romania =

Patriarch of Romania from 1939 to 1948

His Beatitude Patriarch Nicodim of Romania
- By God's mercy, Archbishop of Bucharest, Metropolitan of Ungro-Vlachia, Locum tenens of the throne of Caesarea Cappadociae and Patriarch of All Romania
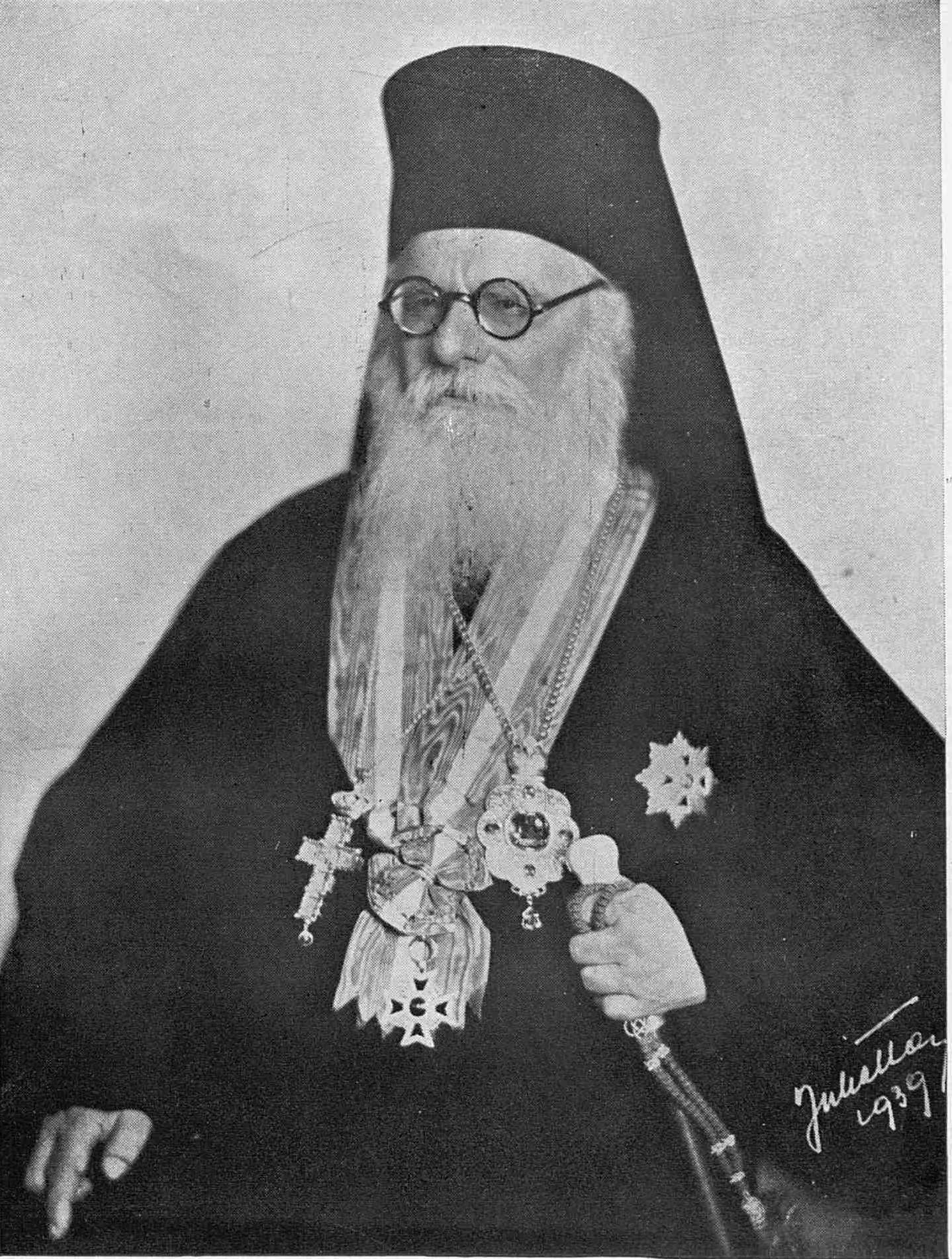
- Church: Romanian Orthodox Church
- See: Bucharest
- Installed: 5 July 1939
- Term ended: 27 February 1948
- Predecessor: Patriarch Miron of Romania
- Successor: Patriarch Justinian of Romania

Personal details
- Born: Nicolae Munteanu; 6 December 1864 Pipirig, Neamț County, Romanian United Principalities
- Died: 27 February 1948 (aged 83) Bucharest, Romanian People's Republic
- Buried: Romanian Patriarchal Cathedral
- Denomination: Eastern Orthodox
- Education: Kiev Theological Academy, Russian Empire

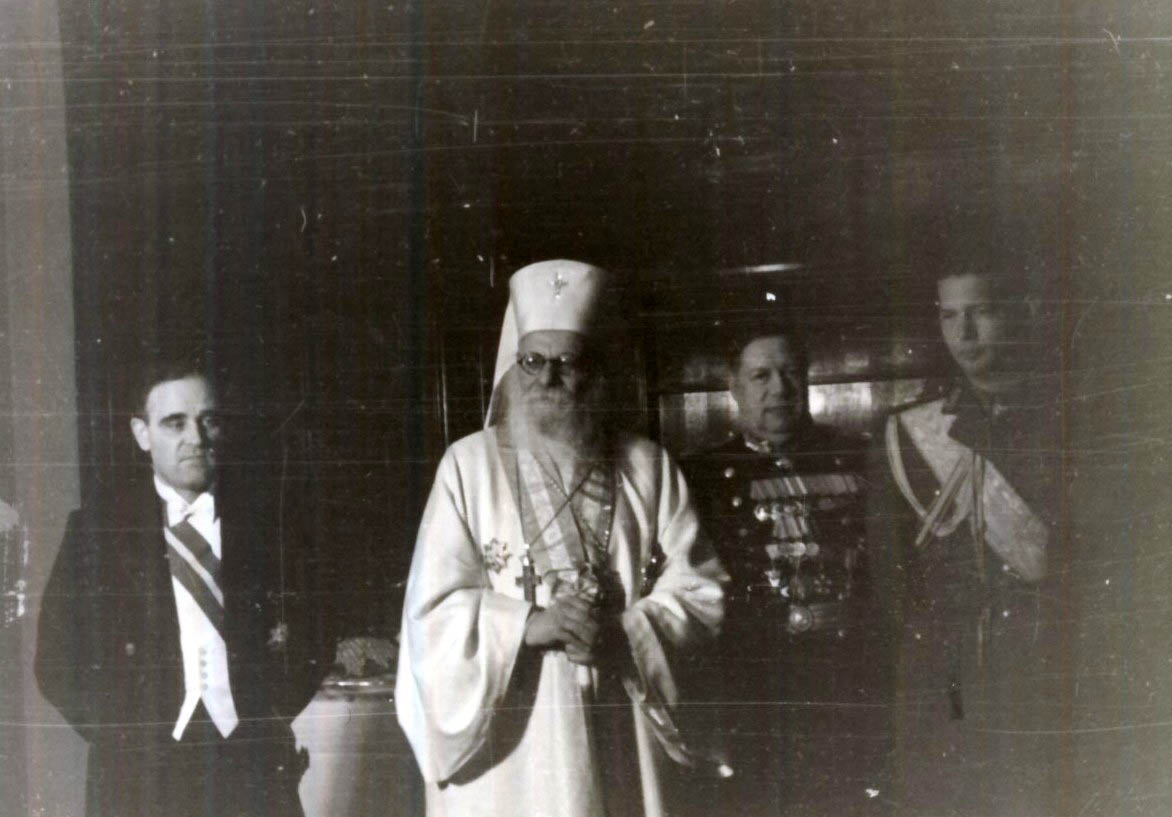
Patriarh Nicodim (centre), with Mihai I (right) and Gheorghiu-Dej (left) at a reception at the Soviet embassy, 1946

Nicodim (Romanian pronunciation: [nikoˈdim]), born Nicolae Munteanu ([nikoˈla.e munˈte̯anu]; 6 December 1864, Pipirig, Neamț County, Romania – 27 February 1948, Bucharest), was the head of the Romanian Orthodox Church (Patriarch of All Romania) between 1939 and 1948.

== Biography ==
He studied theology at the Kiev Theological Academy, Russian Empire and became a monk at Neamț Monastery in 1894. Nicodim was supportive of the King and the royal family and a notable anti-Communist, refusing to give support for the Soviet-backed Communist regime in the process of installation in Romania in 1945–1947. Immediately, rumors circulated to the effect that he had been murdered, perhaps with Soviet approval. However, all available evidence indicates the patriarch died of natural causes.

Nicodim Munteanu was buried at the Romanian Patriarchal Cathedral in Bucharest, next to the first Patriarch of Romania Miron Cristea.

== Notes ==
Eastern Orthodox Church titles
Preceded by Miron Cristea	Patriarch of All Romania; 1939–1948	Succeeded by Justinian Marina
