= Sofronie Drincec =

Romanian bishop

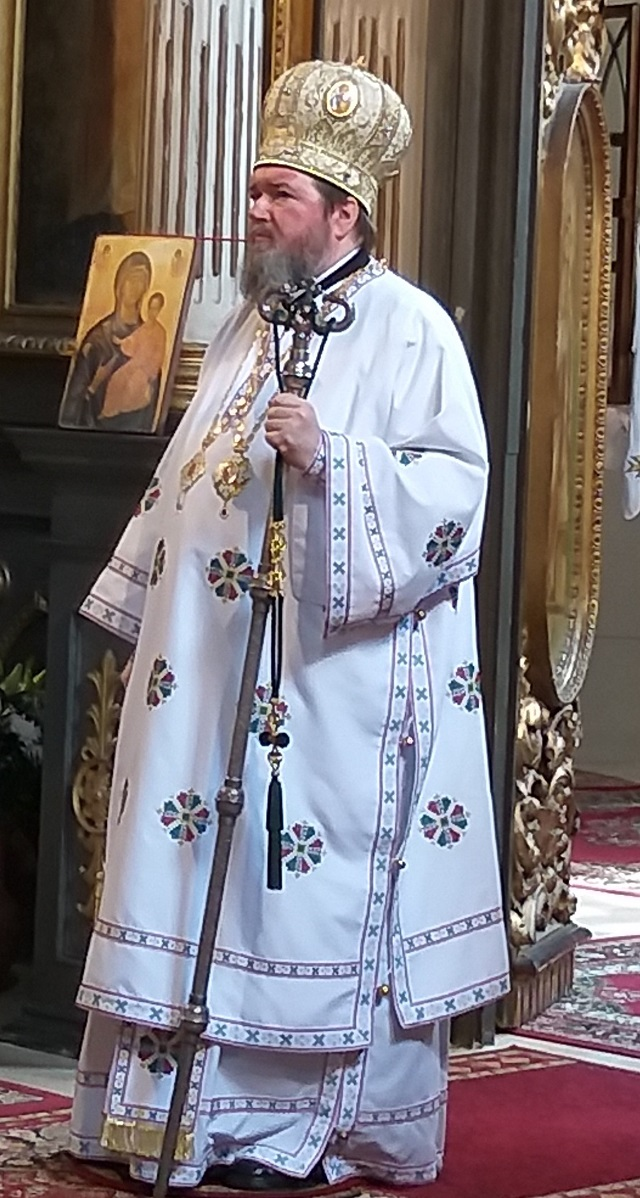
- Sofronie Drincec at the Romanian Orthodox Cathedral Saint Nicholas in Gyula, Hungary
- Church: Romanian Orthodox Church
- Diocese: Oradea, formerly Gyula
- Installed: 1999–2007 (Gyula); 2007–present (Oradea)
- Predecessor: Title created (Gyula); Ioan Mihălțan (Oradea)
- Successor: Siluan Mănuilă (Gyula); Incumbent (Oradea)

Personal details
- Born: Radu Ștefan Drincec; 3 November 1967 (age 58) Arad, Romania
- Denomination: Eastern Orthodox Church
- Profession: Physician, theologian

Sofronie Drincec (born 3 November 1967 as Radu Ștefan Drincec) is a bishop of the Romanian Orthodox Church.

== Life ==
Drincec was born in Arad, Romania, and is the son of Petru Drincec and Maria Drincec. In 1986, he graduated from the Moise Nicoară National College after studying mathematics and physics. Between 1987 and 1993, he studied in the Victor Babeș University of Medicine and Pharmacy at Timișoara, receiving the degree of Doctor of Medicine. In 1993, he entered the theology faculty of the Aurel Vlaicu University of Arad, from where he would graduate in 1997.

While studying at the university, Drincec worked as a physician in Arad between 1993 and 1994. During the course of the years 1994, 1995 and 1996, he also performed spiritual formation in the Patriarchal Stavropegic Monastery of St. John the Baptist in Maldon, England, in the United Kingdom. In 1995, he was sent to the Hodoș-Bodrog Monastery, and during the fast of the Dormition of the Mother of God of the same year, Drincec was ordained as a monk and given the name "Sofronie" for the office. Later, still in the Hodoș-Bodrog Monastery, he became a hierodeacon and then a hieromonk. Subsequently, he would be appointed priest. He then went to the St. Simeon Stylites Monastery at Arad, where he would carry out his new office between the end of 1995 and mid-1997.

On 15 December 1998, he was appointed as the main candidate to fill the vacant position of bishop of the Diocese of Gyula. The Holy Synod of the Romanian Orthodox Church would grant him the title of bishop on 4 February 1999 and the Patriarch of All Romania Teoctist Arăpașu made him archimandrite three days later. Finally, on 21 February, the ordination and installation ceremonies of Drincec as the first bishop of the Diocese of Gyula, in Hungary, took place.

He would remain in office until 13 February 2007, when he was elected as bishop of the Romanian Orthodox Diocese of Oradea. His enthronement occurred on 25 February at the Moon Church of Oradea. There, Drincec spoke with the bishop of the Romanian Catholic Eparchy of Oradea Mare Virgil Bercea and asked him to help overcome the differences between the Greek Catholic and Orthodox dioceses of the city. He was succeeded as a bishop in Gyula by Siluan Mănuilă on 11 March.

On 17 August 2020, news that Drincec had retired as the bishop of Oradea broke out on Facebook. However, they were proven to be false since the diocese did not have any account on the platform at the time.
