= Metropolis of Banat =

The Metropolis of Banat (Romanian: Mitropolia Banatului) is a metropolis of the Romanian Orthodox Church. Its see is the Archdiocese of Timișoara; its suffragan dioceses are the Archdiocese of Arad and the Diocese of Caransebeș. The headquarters is the Metropolitan Cathedral in Timișoara. It covers the Romanian portion of the historic region of Banat. It is the successor of a metropolis attested to the early 18th century that later became a diocese before being dissolved in the mid-19th century. The modern metropolis was established in April 1947.

The Diocese of Gyula in Hungary and the Diocese of Dacia Felix in Serbia used to work under the Metropolis of Banat, but in 2009, they were transferred under the subordination of the Patriarch of All Romania.

== Metropolitan bishops ==
- Vasile Lăzărescu (October 1947 – December 1961)
- Nicolae Corneanu (March 1962 – September 2014)
- Ioan Selejan (from December 2014)
