= Ioannis Tassias =

Greek Orthodox bishop (1958–2020)

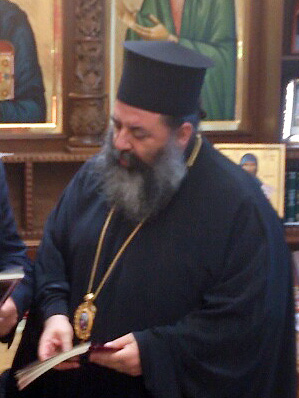
Tassias in 2016

Ioannis Tassias (Thessaloniki, 3 November 1958 – 15 November 2020) was a Greek Orthodox bishop, Metropolitan of Langadas as Ioannis of Langada from 2010 until his death in 2020.

== Biography ==
Tassias was born in 1958 in Thessaloniki, Greece. In 1979 he graduated from the Church Pedagogical Academy (Εκκλησιαστική Παιδαγωγική Ακαδημία), and in 1982, from the Faculty of Pastoral and Social Theology of the Aristotle University of Thessaloniki.

In 1982, in Thessaloniki, he was ordained deacon by Metropolitan Panteleimon (Chrysophakis) and headed the youth department of the Metropolis of Thessaloniki.

In 1983 he was ordained a presbyter by Metropolitan Panteleimon and carried out pastoral ministry in the Church of Saints Methodius and Cyril, and in 1994 he was appointed as a priest at the Cathedral of Saint Demetrius. He was a protosyncellus of the Thessalonian metropolis, and also hegumen of the monastery of St. Theodore of Thessalonica.

On May 10, 2010, he was elected for ordination to the rank of Metropolitan of Langadas, Liti and Rentina by the Holy Synod of the hierarchy of the Greek Orthodox Church. On May 16, 2010, he was consecrated bishop by Archbishop Ieronymos II of Athens, in the Cathedral of Saint Demetrius in Thessaloniki.

On 13 November 2020, he was diagnosed with COVID-19 and was admitted to the Papageorgiou Clinic in Thessaloniki. Two days later, he died from complications caused by COVID-19 at the age of 62, becoming the first Metropolitan of the Church of Greece to die from the pandemic.
