= Siluan Mănuilă =

Romanian bishop

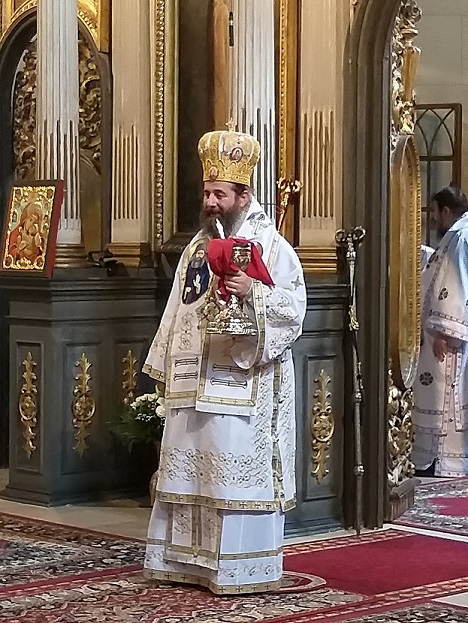
- Siluan Mănuilă at the St. Nicholas Romanian Orthodox Cathedral in Gyula
- Church: Romanian Orthodox Church
- Diocese: Gyula, formerly Dacia Felix
- Installed: 2007–present (Gyula); 2017–2022 (Dacia Felix)
- Predecessor: Sofronie Drincec (Gyula); Daniil Stoenescu (Dacia Felix)
- Successor: Incumbent (Gyula); Ieronim Crețu (Dacia Felix)

Personal details
- Born: Cristian Constantin Mănuilă; 16 September 1971 (age 54) Chelmac, Romania
- Denomination: Eastern Orthodox Church
- Profession: Theologian

Siluan Mănuilă (born 16 September 1971 as Cristian Constantin Mănuilă) is a bishop of the Romanian Orthodox Church. He is the bishop of the Diocese of Gyula since 2007 and was the leader of the Diocese of Dacia Felix from 2017 to 2022.

He completed his secondary education in Arad, Romania, continuing his theological studies in Sibiu and later in Athens, Greece. He went to Hungary in 1999, after the election of Sofronie Drincec as bishop of the Diocese of Gyula. In 2002, Mănuilă was named hegumen of the skete Adormirea Maicii Domnului (Assumption of the Virgin Mary) in Körösszakál. In 2003, he was appointed archimandrite and received the patriarchal cross, and until 2007, he was the cultural assessor of the Diocese of Gyula. Mănuilă was elected bishop of the diocese on 11 March 2007, taking office on 8 July. On 4 August 2014, the President of Romania Traian Băsescu awarded him and many other bishops the Order of Cultural Merit for their efforts in getting involved in the lives of the Romanian diaspora in other countries (Hungary in Mănuilă's case).

On 1 August 2017, Mănuilă also became leader of the Diocese of Dacia Felix in Serbia due to health problems of the previous bishop, Daniil Stoenescu. He was replaced on 5 July 2022 by Ieronim Crețu.
