= Diocese of Gyula =

Diocese of Gyula Episcopia Ortodoxă Română din Gyula Gyulai Román Ortodox Püspökség
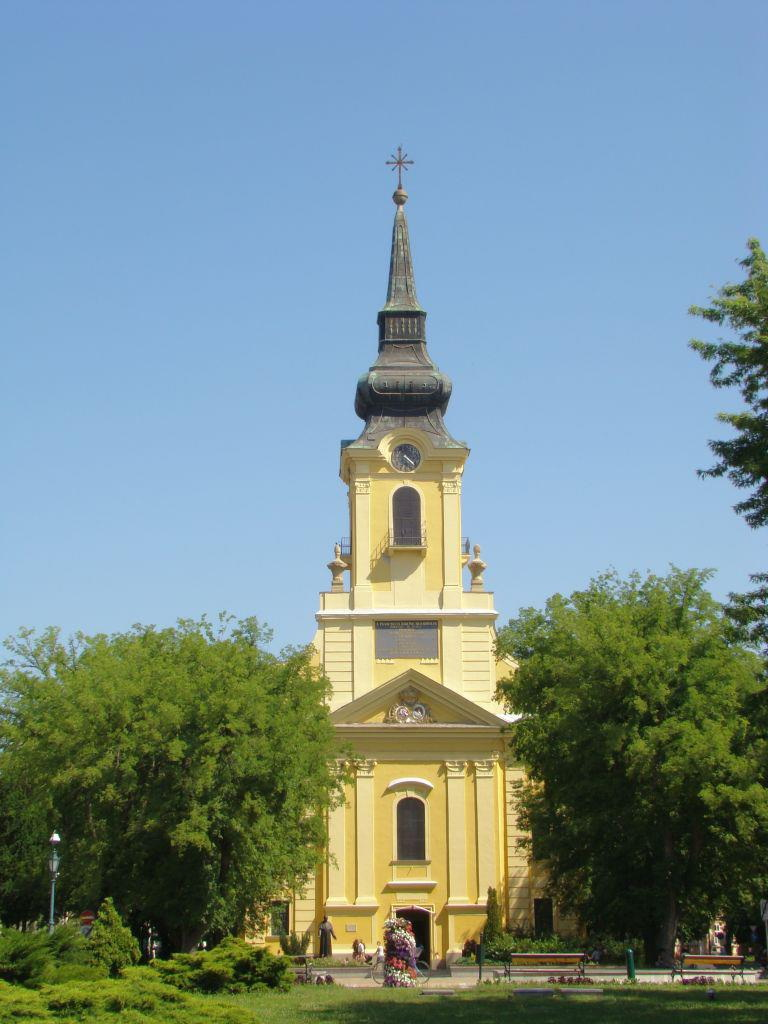
- The St. Nicholas Romanian Orthodox Cathedral in Gyula

Location
- Country: Hungary
- Territory: Southeastern Hungary
- Headquarters: Gyula

Statistics
- Members: 5,204

Information
- Denomination: Romanian Orthodox
- Rite: Byzantine Rite
- Established: 1999

Current leadership
- Bishop: Siluan Mănuilă

The Diocese of Gyula (Hungarian: Gyulai Román Ortodox Püspökség; Romanian: Episcopia Ortodoxă Română din Gyula, also Jula or Giula) is the Romanian Orthodox diocese of the Romanians in Hungary.

== History ==
The diocese was established in 1999 for the Romanian minority of Hungary, forming part of the Metropolis of Banat. Gyula (Romanian: Jula or Giula), a Hungarian town near the Hungary–Romania border, was chosen as the administrative center. The first bishop, Sofronie Drincec, served from 21 February 1999 to 25 February 2007, later serving in the Diocese of Oradea in Romania. The second and current bishop is Siluan Mănuilă, in charge since 8 July 2007. The diocese was withdrawn from the Metropolis of Banat in 2009 to be directly subordinate to the Patriarch of All Romania. In 2010, the diocese had 19 parishes and two monasteries in which 15 priests worked.

== See also ==
- Assembly of Canonical Orthodox Bishops of Austria
