= Archdiocese of Bucharest =

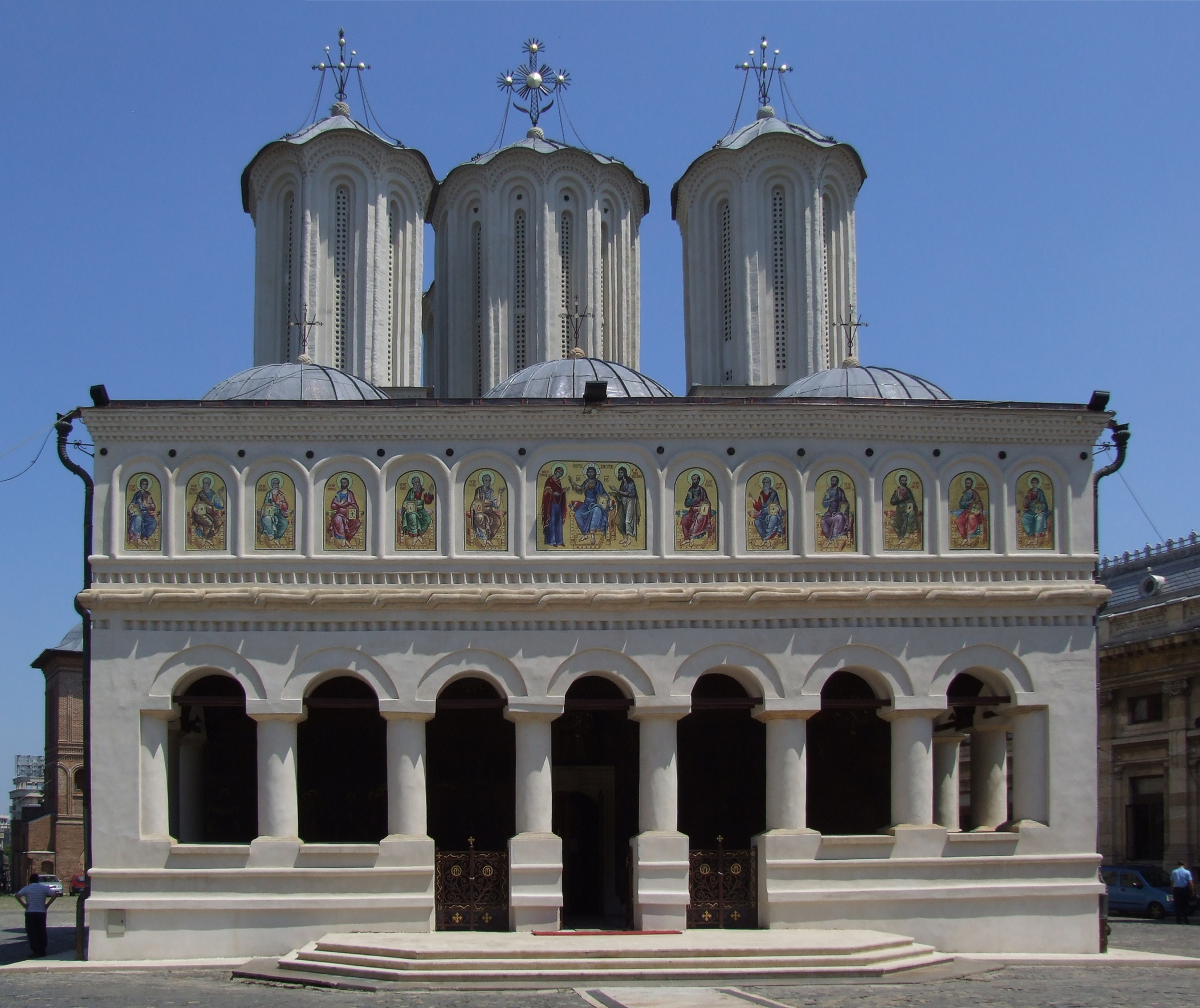
Romanian Patriarchal Cathedral in Bucharest

The Archdiocese of Bucharest (Romanian: Arhiepiscopia Bucureștilor) is an episcopal see of the Romanian Orthodox Church with jurisdiction over the counties of Ilfov and Prahova. The current head of the Archdiocese is Patriarch Daniel, as Archbishop of Bucharest, Metropolitan of Muntenia and Dobruja.

== Administrative Structure ==
The Archdiocese of Bucharest is structured into 13 deaneries (protoierii), which manage the parishes within their respective territories. These deaneries include:

- Protoieria 1 Capitală
- Protoieria 2 Capitală
- Protoieria 3 Capitală
- Protoieria 4 Capitală
- Protoieria 5 Capitală
- Protoieria 6 Capitală
- Protoieria Ilfov Sud
- Protoieria Ilfov Nord
- Protoieria Ploiești Sud
- Protoieria Ploiești Nord
- Protoieria Câmpina
- Protoieria Vălenii de Munte
- Protoieria Urlați

Each deanery oversees multiple parishes, ensuring that the religious and administrative needs of the Orthodox faithful in the region are met.
