= Laurențiu Streza =

Laurențiu Streza (Romanian pronunciation: [la.uˈrentsju ˈstreza]; born Liviu Streza; October 12, 1947) is a Romanian cleric, a metropolitan bishop in the Romanian Orthodox Church.

Born in Sâmbăta de Sus, Brașov County, he attended grade school in his native village from 1954 to 1961. His father died when he was 13. He attended Radu Negru High School in Făgăraș (1961–1965) followed by theological seminary in Sibiu (1965–1969). He obtained a Theology doctorate in 1985 from the Bucharest seminary. Streza married Eugenia Stanciu in 1969 before being ordained a priest that December. The couple had five children; Eugenia died in 1992. In the summer of 1996, he was elected bishop in the Diocese of Caransebeș, tonsured a monk and given his present first name, and installed as bishop. In 2005, he was made Metropolitan of Transylvania, with his seat at the Holy Trinity Cathedral in Sibiu.

Streza has been an honorary member of the Romanian Academy since 2015.
