= Patriarch of All Romania =

Head of the Romanian Orthodox Church

Patriarch of Romania
- Archbishopric

Eastern Orthodox
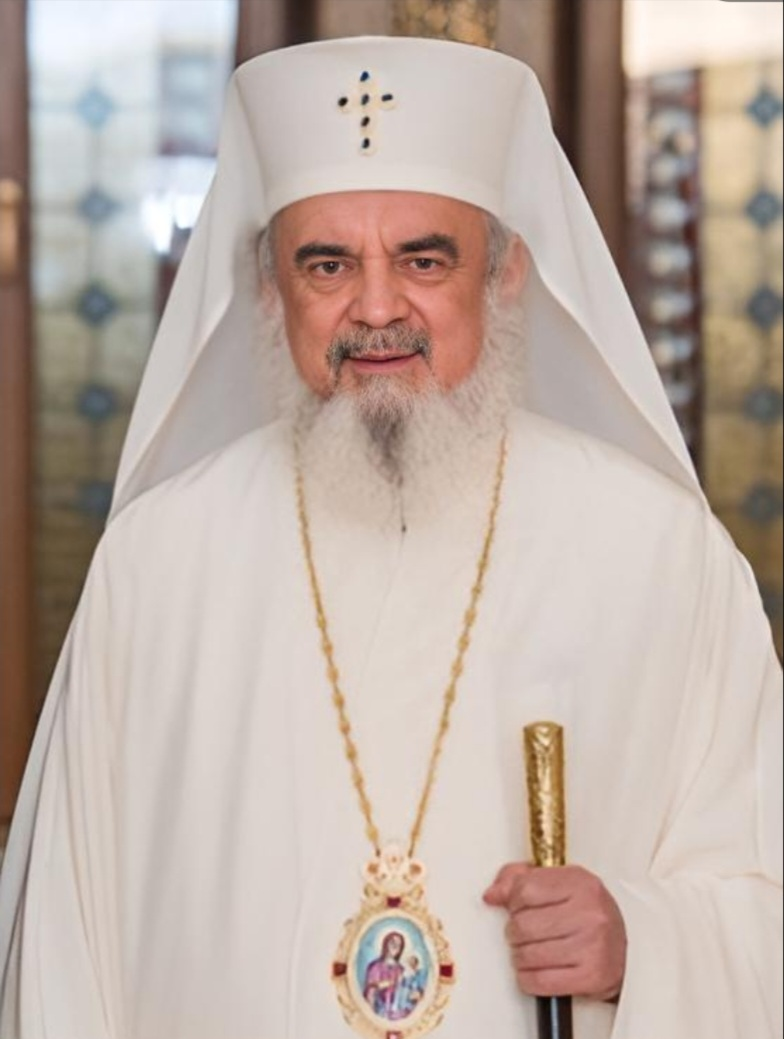

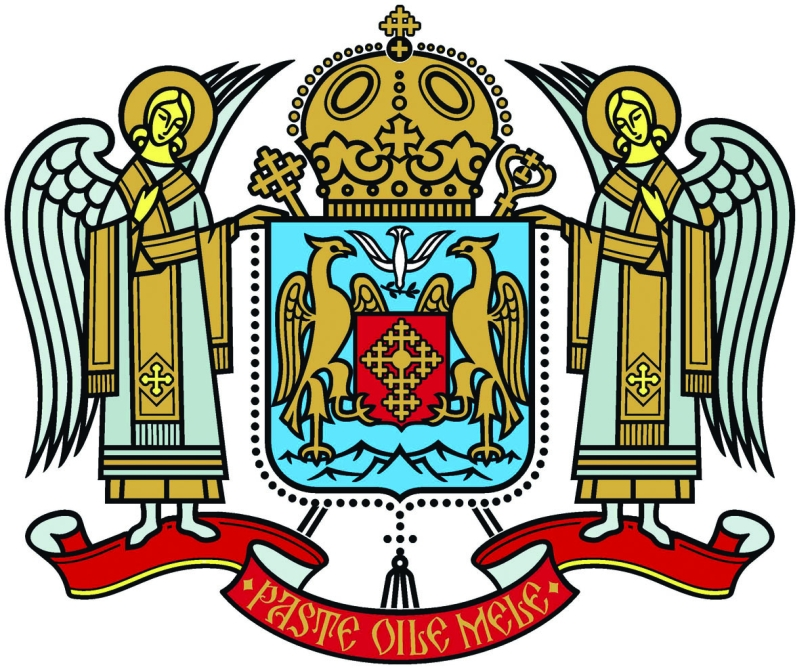
- Coat of arms of the Romanian Orthodox Church
- Incumbent; Daniel since 12 September 2007
- Style: His Beatitude

Location
- Residence: Palace of the Patriarchate, Dealul Mitropoliei, Bucharest

Information
- First holder: Miron
- Established: 4 February 1925

Website
- patriarhia.ro

The Patriarch of All Romania (Romanian: Patriarh al Întregii Românii; Romanian pronunciation: [patriˈarh al ɨnˈtred͡ʒi romɨˈni]) is the title of the head of the Romanian Orthodox Church. The Patriarch is officially styled as Archbishop of Bucharest, Metropolitan of Muntenia and Dobruja, Locum tenens of the throne of Caesarea Cappadociae and Patriarch of the Romanian Orthodox Church. The current patriarch Daniel acceded to this position on 12 September 2007.

== Metropolitans of All Romania ==
No.	Primate	Portrait	Reign			Notes
1	Nifon		8 October 1850	5 May 1875	24 years, 6 months and 27 days	
2	Calinic		31 May 1875	14 August 1886	11 years, 2 months and 14 days	
3	Iosif		22 November 1886	18 May 1893	6 years, 5 months and 26 days	First tenure.
4	Ghenadie		21 May 1893	20 May 1896	2 years, 11 months and 29 days	
	Iosif		6 December 1896	24 January 1909	12 years, 1 month and 18 days	Second tenure.
5	Atanasie		5 February 1909	28 June 1911	2 years, 4 months and 23 days	
6	Conon		19 February 1912	1 December 1919	7 years, 9 months and 12 days	
7	Miron		31 December 1919	1 November 1925	5 years, 10 months and 1 day	Elevated to Patriarch.

== Patriarchs of All Romania ==
No.	Primate	Portrait	Reign			Notes
1	Miron		4 February 1925	6 March 1939	14 years, 1 month and 2 days	Served as Prime Minister of Romania from 11 February 1938 to 6 March 1939. Led the Romanian Orthodox Church for 19 years, 2 months and 6 days.
2	Nicodim		5 July 1939	27 February 1948	8 years, 7 months and 22 days	
3	Justinian		6 June 1948	26 March 1977	28 years, 9 months and 22 days	
4	Iustin		19 June 1977	31 July 1986	9 years, 1 month and 12 days	
5	Teoctist		16 November 1986	30 July 2007	20 years, 8 months and 14 days	Briefly resigned from 18 January 1990 to 5 April 1990, in the aftermath of the Romanian Revolution.
6	Daniel		12 September 2007	Incumbent	18 years, 10 months and 6 days (as of 18 July 2026)	

=== Timeline ===
This is a graphical timeline of the patriarchs of the Romanian Orthodox Church. They are listed in order of first assuming office.

The following chart lists the patriarchs by lifespan, with the years outside of their tenure in blue.

== See also ==
- List of hierarchs of the Romanian Orthodox Church
- Metropolitans of Ungro-Wallachia
- Metropolitans of Moldavia
