= Dealul Mitropoliei =

Heritage site in Bucharest, Romania

Coordinates: 44.424948°N 26.098377°E

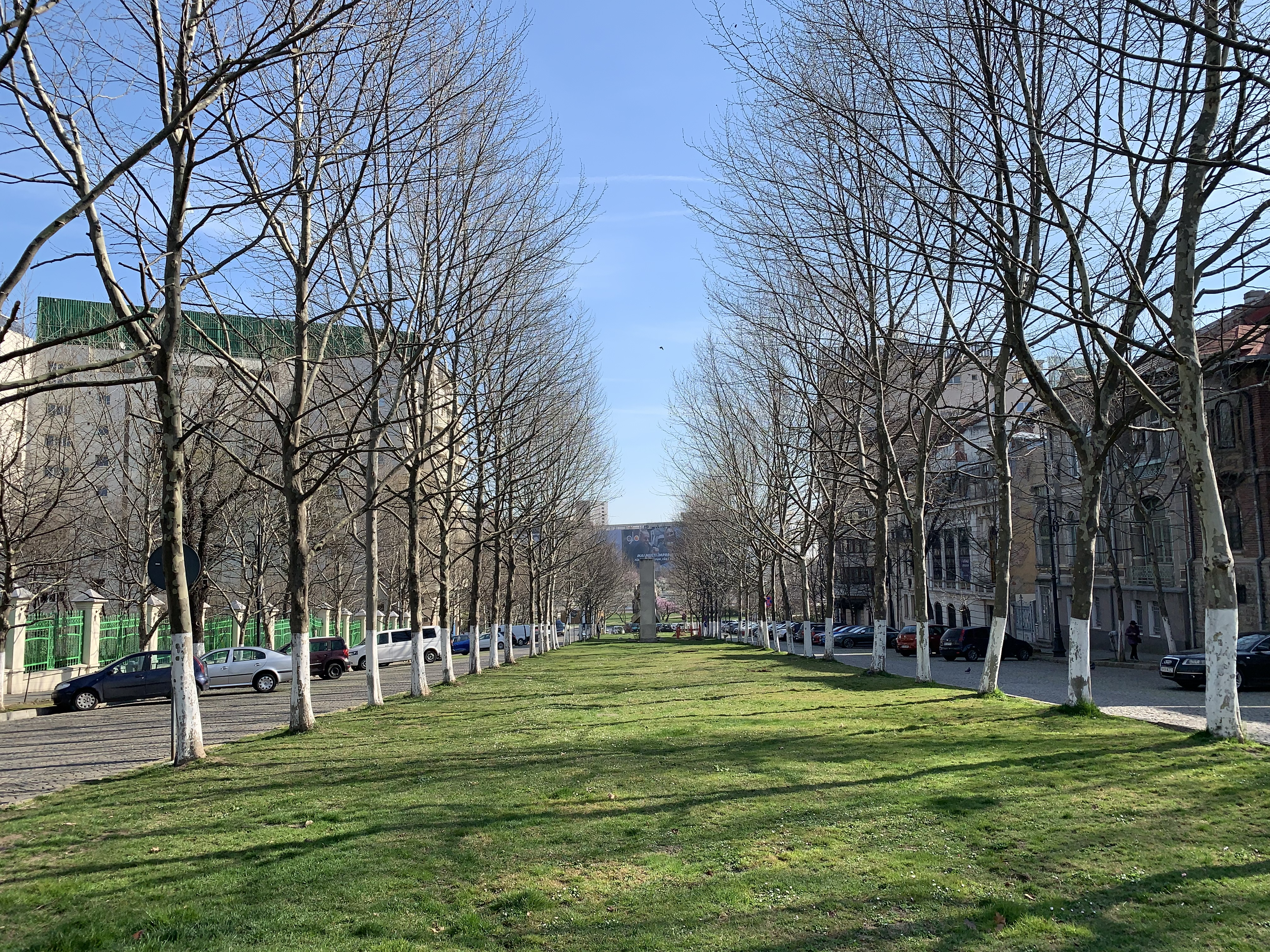
The pedestrian park of the Dealul Mitropoliei, pictured here looking downhill from the Alexander John Cuza Statue near the top

Dealul Mitropoliei (Romanian: [ˈde̯alul mitropoˈli.ej], Metropolitanate Hill), also called Dealul Patriarhiei (IPA: [ˈde̯alul patriarˈhi.ej], Patriarchate Hill), is a small hill in Bucharest, Romania and an important historic, cultural, architectural, religious and touristic point in the national capital. From a religious point of view, it is one of the centres of Romanian Orthodoxy: the headquarters of the Romanian Patriarchate and the residence of the Patriarch are both located here.

A series of events in the history of Romania is closely linked to this place, for until 1997, the Chamber of Deputies of Romania as well as the Great National Assembly met in the Palace of the Chamber of Deputies in the Patriarchal complex. Also here, in the building where the Princely Divan met, Alexandru Ioan Cuza was elected prince of Moldavia and Wallachia.

== History ==
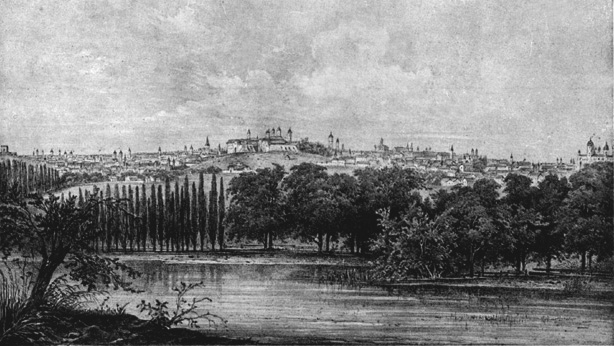
Bucharest at the beginning of the 19th century. Dealul Mitropoliei is in the centre of the drawing; Curtea Arsă to the left and Radu Vodă Monastery to the right (drawing by R. Bielitz)

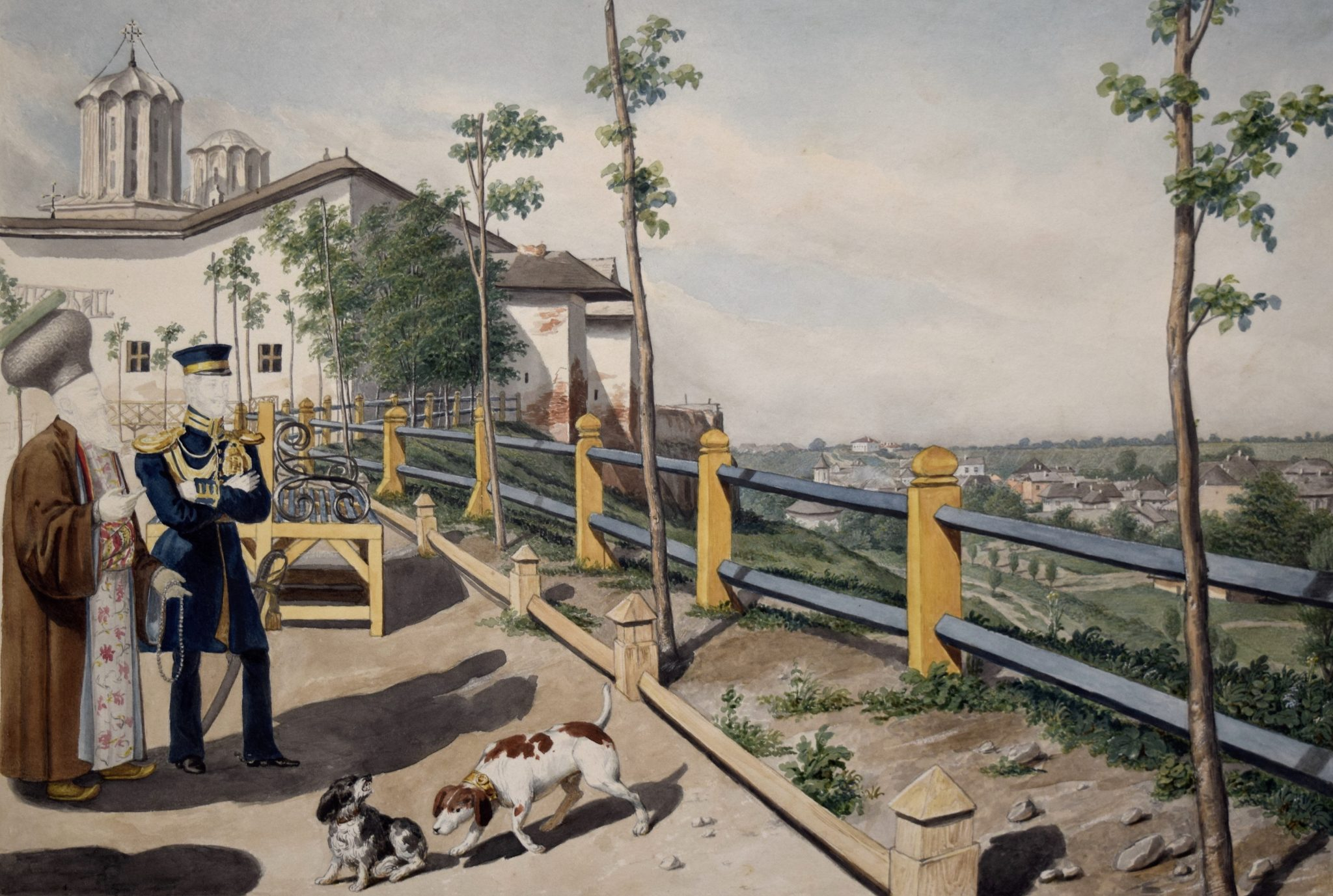
Scene atop the hill from 1832

In about 1650 the hill was covered in grapevines owned by the country's voivodes. The monastic complex was surrounded by walls, like a citadel; beginning in 1698, access to the monastery yard was provided by the bell tower built by Constantin Brâncoveanu. Three stone crosses stood within the yard: one in memory of Metropolitan Teodosie (d. 1708), another in honour of General Miloradovich (d. 1825), and one commemorating the 1655 revolt of the seimeni, during the reign of Constantin Șerban, against the boyars. The seimeni were a regiment of 2,000 foreign soldiers, drawn up by the prince, whose mission was to fight in foreign wars. During this revolt Papa Brâncoveanu, Constantin's father, was killed. Preda, Papa's father, later assassinated by Radu Mihnea, raised a wooden cross on the spot where his son was killed. Later, one of Constantin Brâncoveanu's sons, Constantin Beizadea, replaced the wooden cross with one of stone, still preserved, with an inscription stating it was built on July 20, 1713.

In 1859, the election of Alexander John Cuza as prince of Moldavia and Wallachia was greeted with widespread acclaim by the two provinces' inhabitants. However, there existed in Wallachia a conservative movement opposed to Cuza's victory. As the conservatives held a majority in the electoral assembly, the unionists decided to gather together a crowd during the sessions of January 22–24, 1859. Over 30,000 people gathered on Dealul Mitropoliei, residents of Bucharest and its surroundings who came in support of Cuza and to keep the legislature under pressure. Attempting to free the assembly from popular pressure, the Wallachian caimacam's office decided to move two battalions of troops in the middle of the masses on the hill and to use force to disperse them. Due to pressure from the masses and the desire to avoid a bloodbath, General Barbu Vlădoianu was compelled to order his troops to return to their barracks. On the evening of January 23 the conservatives realised that they could not depend on the army to sustain their position, so the following day the assembly voted unanimously to support Vasile Boerescu's motion that Cuza be proclaimed prince of Moldavia and Wallachia.

== Sites ==
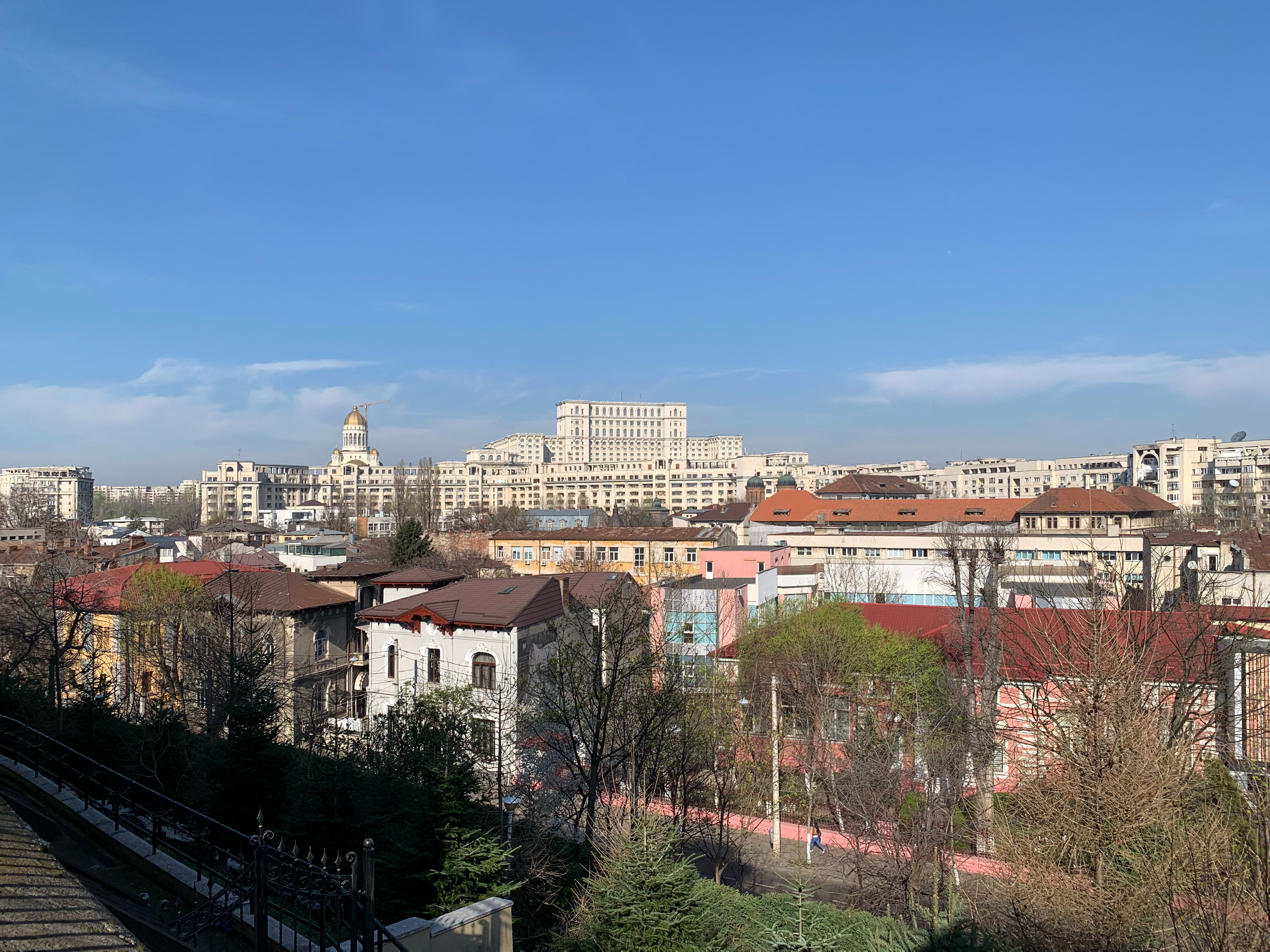
Bucharest, seeing Palace of the Parliament, viewed from the top of Dealul Mitropoliei

The Romanian Patriarchal Cathedral is in the centre of the square on the hill. The other buildings are located as follows: to the west, old monastic cells (chilii), later transformed into the Patriarchate's offices; to the southeast, the Patriarchal Palace; to the east, the chapel paraclis and the former Chamber of Deputies; to the north, the bell tower. Booths line the slope of the hill and religious objects such as beeswax candles, prayer books and icons are sold there; the complex is guarded by Romanian Army soldiers. On major feast days such as Pascha, dense crowds throng the hill, a practice that did not abate even under the Communist regime.

=== Romanian Patriarchal Cathedral ===
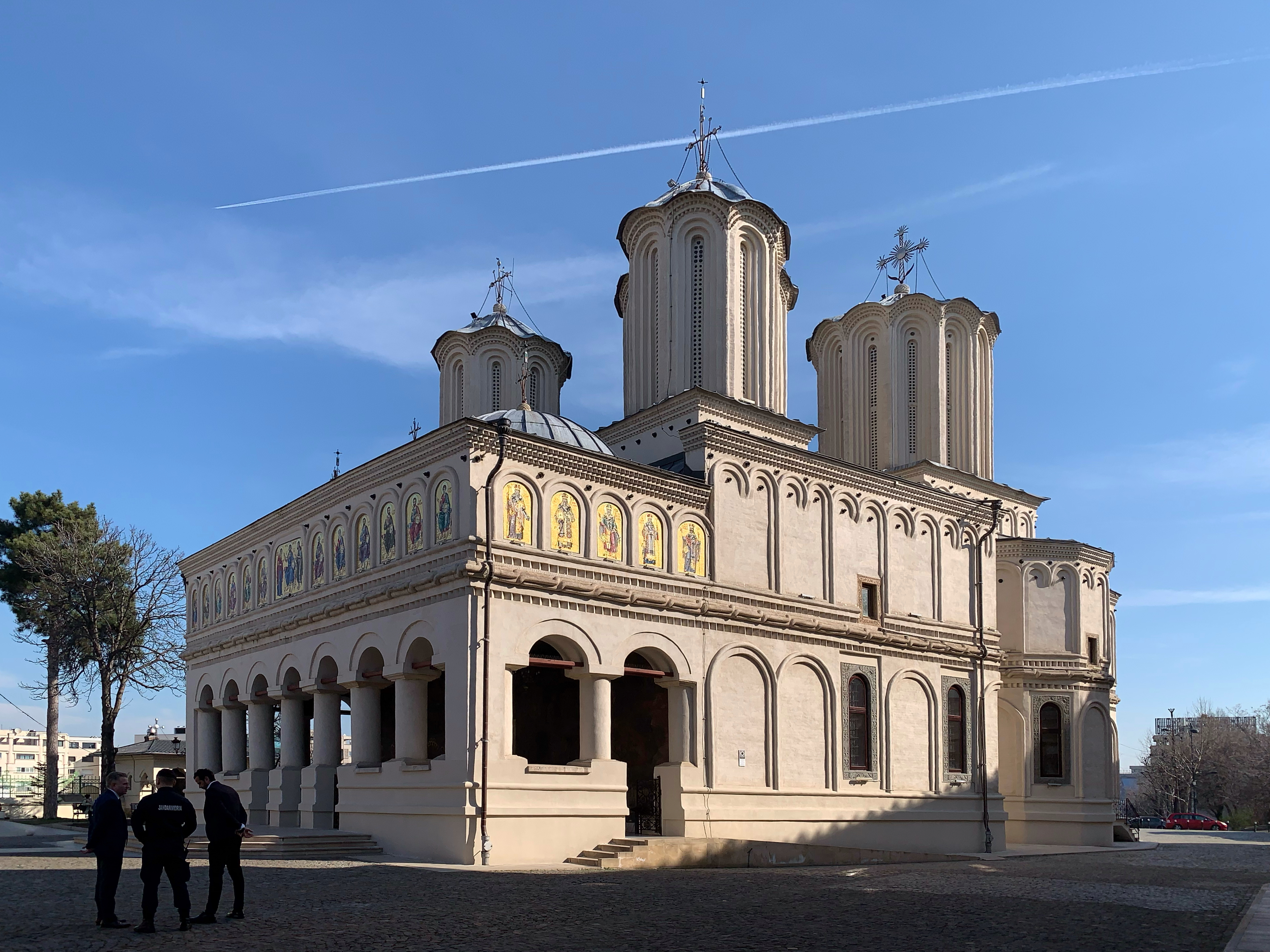
Romanian Patriarchal Cathedral

The cathedral, dedicated to Saints Constantine and Helen, was built between 1654 and 1658 by Constantin Șerban and his wife Bălașa, and consecrated under Mihnea III in 1658. Soon afterwards, the church became Wallachia's metropolitan cathedral. In 1925 the Metropolitanate was elevated to the rank of Patriarchate.

As is usual for churches of that time and place, the builder's name is unknown. The officials (dregători) were logofăt Radu Dudescu and Gheorghe Sufariu.

Broadly speaking, the building is a copy of Curtea de Argeş Cathedral; the cupolas resemble those of Neagoe Basarab's church. The cathedral was restored several times (in 1792–99, 1834–39, 1850, 1886, and 1932–35), for which reason the present building is no longer in its original form, various finishing touches and adjustments having been made over time. Inside are the relics of Saint Dimitrie Basarabov (Dimitrie the New), preserved in a silver coffin, having been brought from Bulgaria on July 13, 1774.

It will eventually be replaced as the Patriarchal seat by the People's Salvation Cathedral.

=== Chapel of the Patriarchal Palace ===
The chapel is the most valuable building on Dealul Mitropoliei. Built in the 17th century along with the palace, the chapel was rebuilt in 1723. Its dedication is found on a Greek inscription inside, painted above the door. The inscription, in verses by the poet Dimitrie Notara, is imprecise: Nicolae Mavrocordat and Metropolitan Daniil Topoloveanu (1719–1731) are presented as being its founders, when in fact they were its restorers.

=== Bell tower ===
When the bell tower (clopotnița) was built, the monastic complex was surrounded by walls, the buildings being located within a yard bounded by these walls. In 1698, Constantin Brâncoveanu ordered the construction of a traditional entrance-gate, that is, in the form of a bell tower. The edifice was restored in 1956–58.

It was beneath this bell tower that Barbu Catargiu, the first Prime Minister of Romania, was assassinated at five o'clock in the evening on June 20, 1862. He had arrived on the hill to give a speech before the Assembly of Deputies, in session in the nearby Palace of the Chamber of Deputies.

=== Patriarchal Palace ===
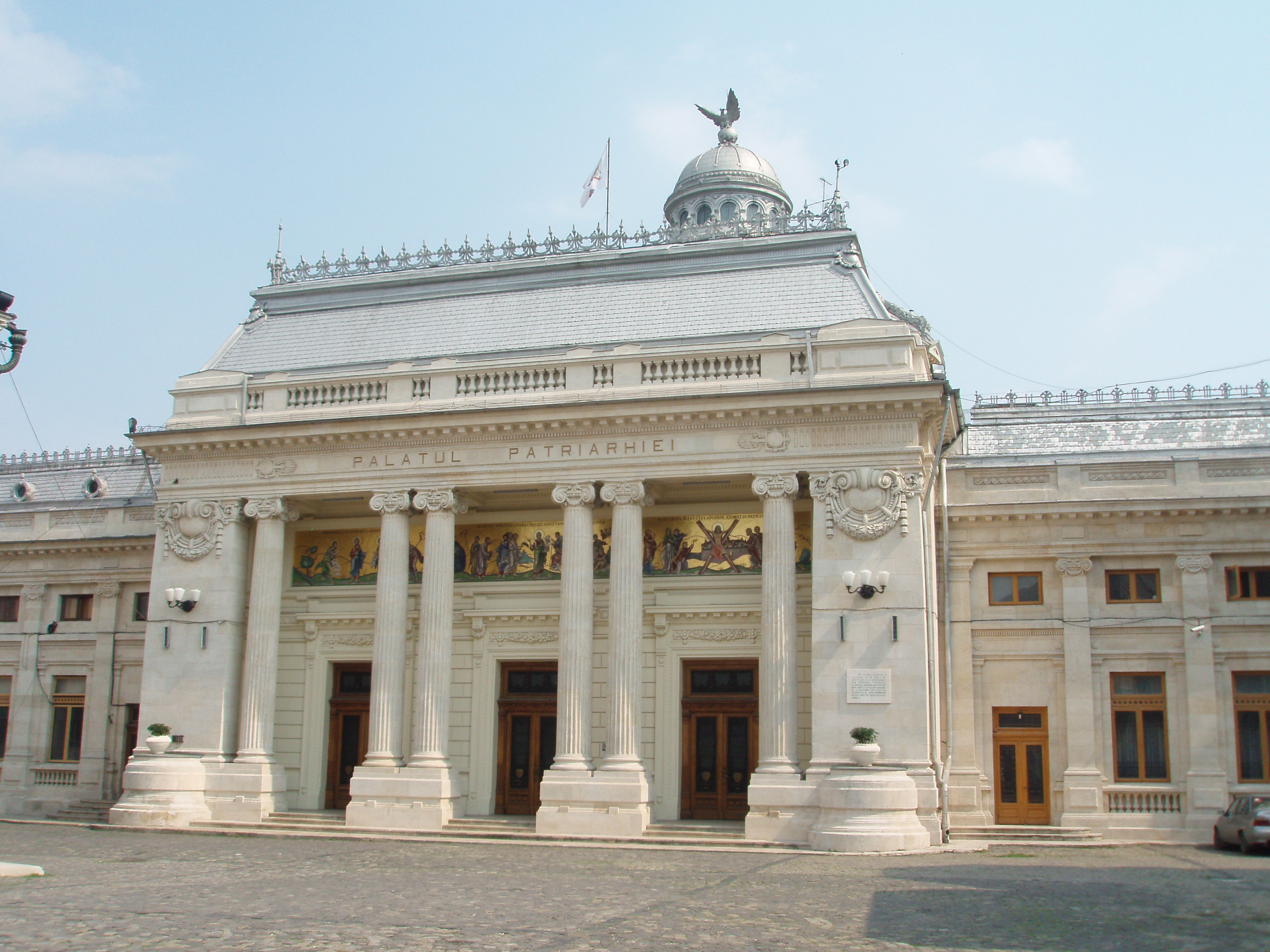
Palace of the Chamber of Deputies

The building that is today the Patriarchal Palace (Palatul Patriarhal) was built under Constantin Șerban and was intended to house the monastery's starets. After 1688, when Radu Leon named the monastery the country's metropolitan cathedral, the old palace was rebuilt; over time, it was expanded and new wings were added. Between 1932 and 1935 the architect Gheorghe Simotta added a new section to the palace, today its main area, which includes a large throne room, chancelleries, the Patriarch's apartment and several other rooms.

On the palace walls there is a series of paintings that depicts several scenes in the monastery's history, as well as from Romanian history. The rooms are decorated with paintings and sculptures representing several of the Patriarchate's heads. Inside, expensive vestments and objects used in religious services are displayed in glass cases.

=== Palace of the Chamber of Deputies ===
The Palace was built in 1907 after the plans of architect Dimitrie Maimarolu, on the site of the princely divan, itself built where a group of old monastic buildings once were. It is built in a neo-classical style, with an 80-metre façade, in the centre of which is a peristyle featuring six Ionic columns. Inside are bronze and marble busts, as well as paintings, of important political figures from Romania's history. The palace library contains over 11,000 volumes of parliamentary debates, copies of Monitorul Oficial and similar official publications, and over 7,000 books.

The building housed the Chamber of Deputies until 1997, when the lower house of Parliament moved into the Palace of the Parliament. Since that year, the Romanian Patriarchate has administered the palace.

== Monuments ==
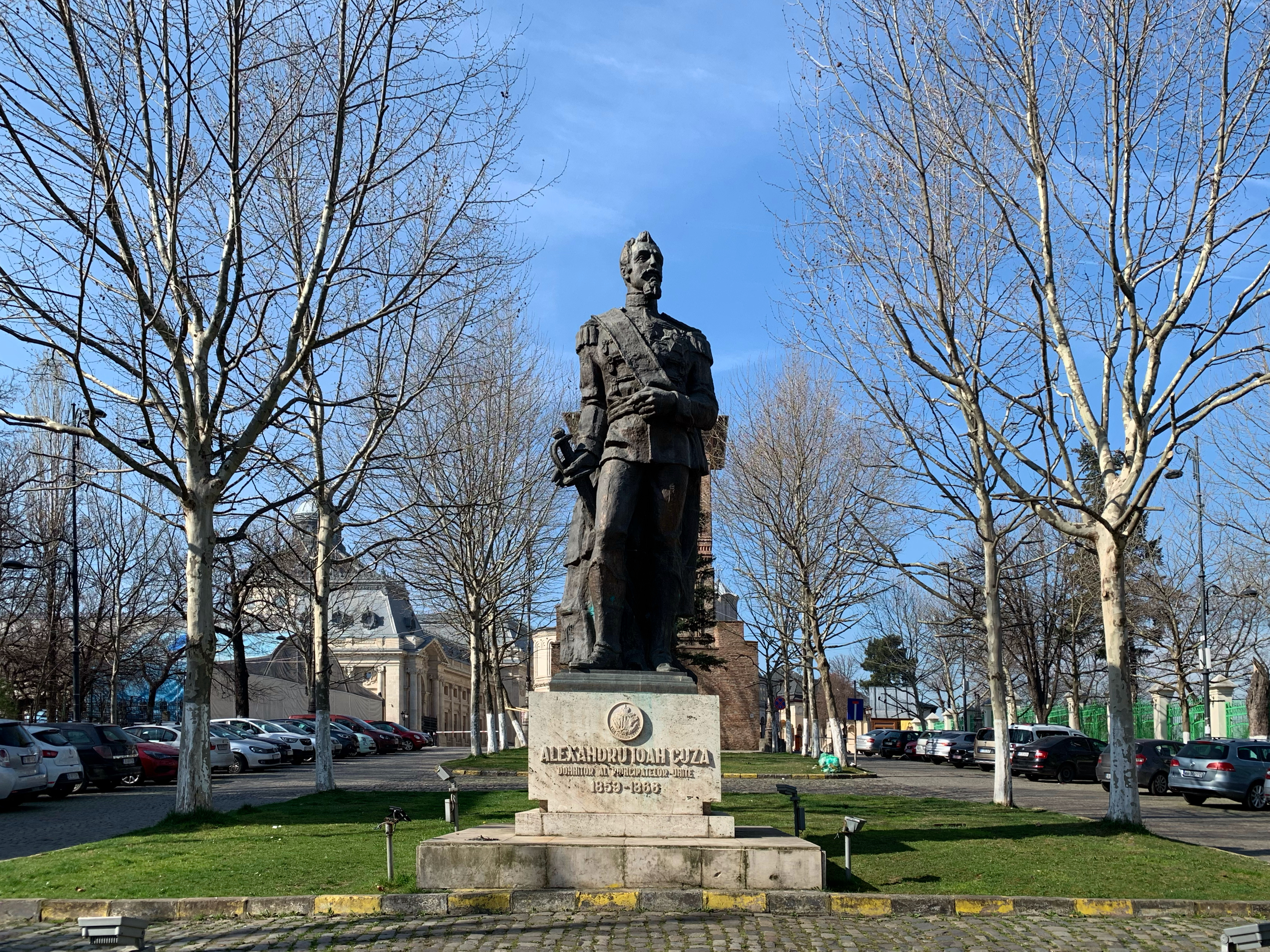
The Statue of Alexandru Ioan Cuza

The Statue of Alexandru Ioan Cuza was unveiled on March 20, 2004, the 184th anniversary of the subject's birth. Ion Iliescu, President of Romania, performed the unveiling in the presence of other dignitaries, including Prime Minister Adrian Năstase and Patriarch Teoctist. Paul Vasilescu was the sculptor. Romanian officials regarded the placing of the statue in Bucharest as the righting of an historical error, given that Romania's national capital lacked a statue of the country's first modern ruler. Patriarch Teoctist noted that the location chosen was not random, but linked to the fact that it was on Dealul Mitropoliei that Cuza was elected prince.

Until 1984, a statue of Barbu Catargiu stood on the hill where he was murdered, as did a Capitoline Wolf Statue from 1931 to 1965.

=== Sun clock ===
The sun clock (ceasornicul de soare) or mid-day cannon (tunul meridian) was located on the hill; its exact position is unknown but it was in the vicinity of the bell tower. Placed on Dealul Mitropoliei in 1845, it functioned until the Wallachian Revolution of 1848, when it was destroyed by an angry populace, together with Regulamentul Organic, which was burned.

The clock's mechanism was fairly simple but ingenious. A sundial was placed on a marble pedestal; the system was based on lenses and a cannon barrel. These two elements were placed such that the sun's rays focused on the lens, after which the resulting solar energy made contact with the cannon's gunpowder. The resulting blast was heard throughout Bucharest, alerting the inhabitants that it was noon. Today only the base survives, although plans for rebuilding the clock were made intermittently during the rest of the 19th century.
