= Basilica News Agency =

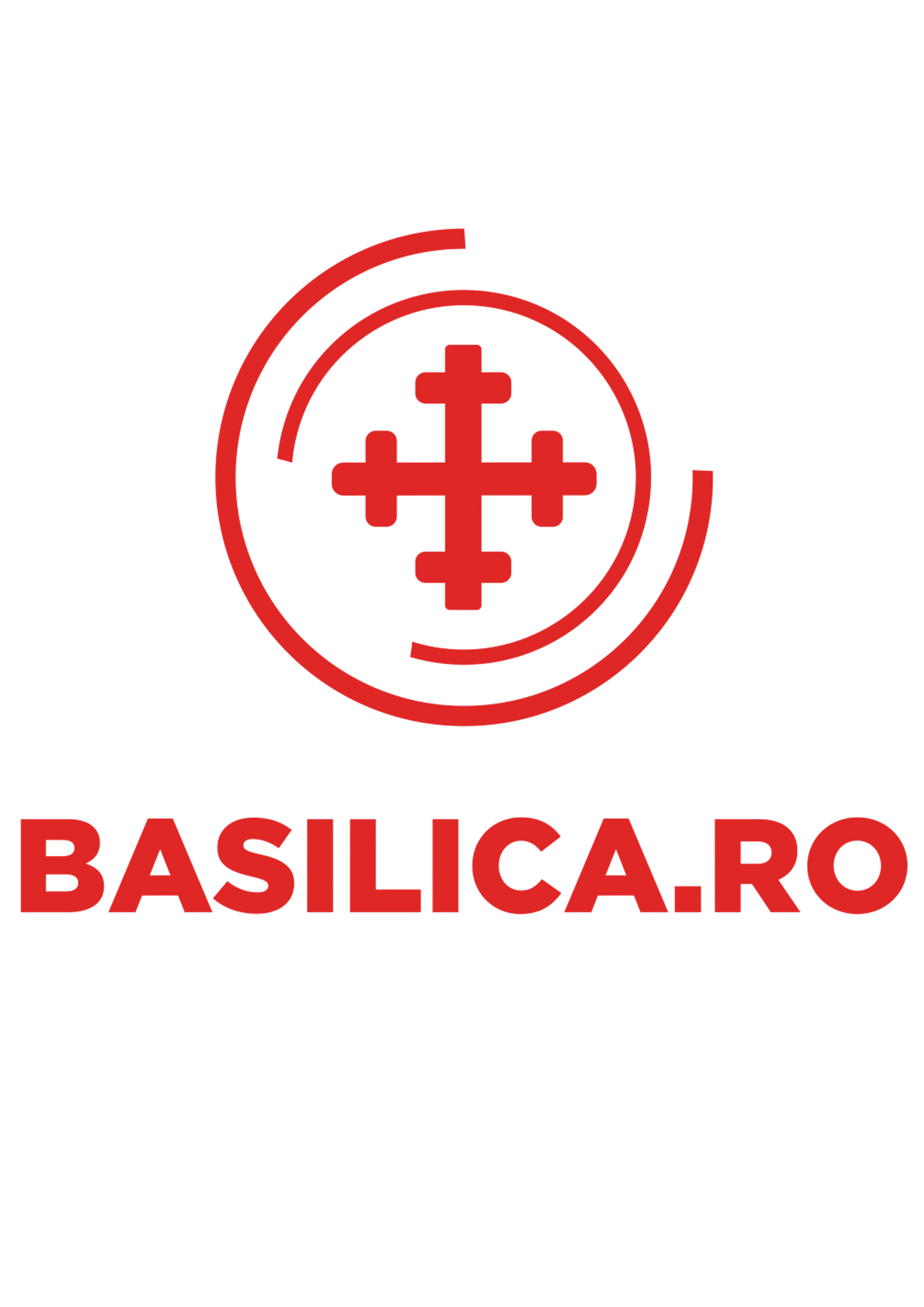
- Format: Online newspaper
- Owner(s): Romanian Patriarchate
- Editor: Patrick Trollope
- Founded: 27 October 2007
- Headquarters: 4-6 Ecaterina Street, Bucharest, Romania
- Website: www.basilica.ro(Romanian version) www.basilica.ro/en(English version)

Basilica News Agency is the official online news service of the Romanian Patriarchate of the Christian Orthodox church. Basilica is part of the BASILICA Press Centre, the communication and public relations department of the Patriarchal Administration.

== History ==
Basilica News Agency was founded on 27 October 2007 and was launched online in Romanian and English on 16 June 2008.

The launch took place in Europa Christiana (Christian Europe) Hall of the Palace of the Patriarchate in Bucharest. The ceremony was opened with a Te Deum service officiated in the presence of Patriarch Daniel of Romania. “Christian mission means bringing Christ’s Spirit to the world, into every home, in every institution where we work, to every job, on every path we walk”, the Patriarch said.

In 2010, the web interface was updated. In 2012, the website was rebuilt entirely and relaunched during the solemn session of the Holy Synod of the Romanian Orthodox Church, held on 28 October 2012. In 2014, the website was updated again and launched on the feast day of the BASILICA Press Centre, on 27 October.

The site currently operates on a WordPress platform. The current website was launched on 26 March 2016.

== Role ==
The Basilica News Agency presents the activities and attitudes of the Romanian Orthodox Church regarding current problems.

News and information are presented in electronic form and contain details regarding church life from home and abroad: activities of the Romanian Patriarch, decisions of the Holy Synod, activities undertaken by dioceses, monasteries, parishes, theological schools and ecclesiastical NGOs, dialogue between Church and society, inter-Orthodox cooperation, inter-confessional and inter-religious dialogues etc.

== Logo ==
The original logo of Basilica News Agency was the same as that of the Basilica Press Centre. This logo presented the Patriarchal Cross surrounded by five concentric circles with different colours (blue, yellow, ruby, emerald and blue chalcedony). These colours represented the five components of the Press Centre. Basilica News Agency was symbolised by emerald.

In March 2016, a separate logo was created for the News Agency. The new logo contains the patriarchal cross surrounded by two red semicircles. The patriarchal cross symbolises the dynamics of the Church life in confessing the infinite love of the Most Holy Trinity. The two semicircles are symbols of balance, but at the same time bring in mind the idea of movement, of dynamism. The red colour recalls the blood of Christ.

== Opinions ==
- Patriarch Daniel called Basilica News Agency a "kaleidoscope of everyday ecclesial reality", "which has fulfilled its vocation to inform and form ecclesial thinking".
- News.ro senior editor, Elvira Gheorghiță, about basilica.ro: "You have made genuine values prominent again, through professionalism and dedication".
- Realitatea TV producer, George Grigoriu: "Basilica.ro is a useful and accurate source of information; a source of information that addresses the reason, but also nourishes the soul".
- Metropolitan Serafim of Germany: "The news website of the Church aims to faithfully reflect the truth that edifies people, strengthens their faith and encourages them to bear the everyday burdens".
- Editor in chief Orthodoxie.com, Rev. Fr. Christophe Levalois: "The activity of the Basilica News Agency is an essential service for spreading Orthodoxy in the world today and for bearing an indispensable witness to its presence, activity and dynamics in the society".
