= Jidava (castra) =

Roman fort near Campulung, Romania

- Câmpulung fort; Jidova, Sidova
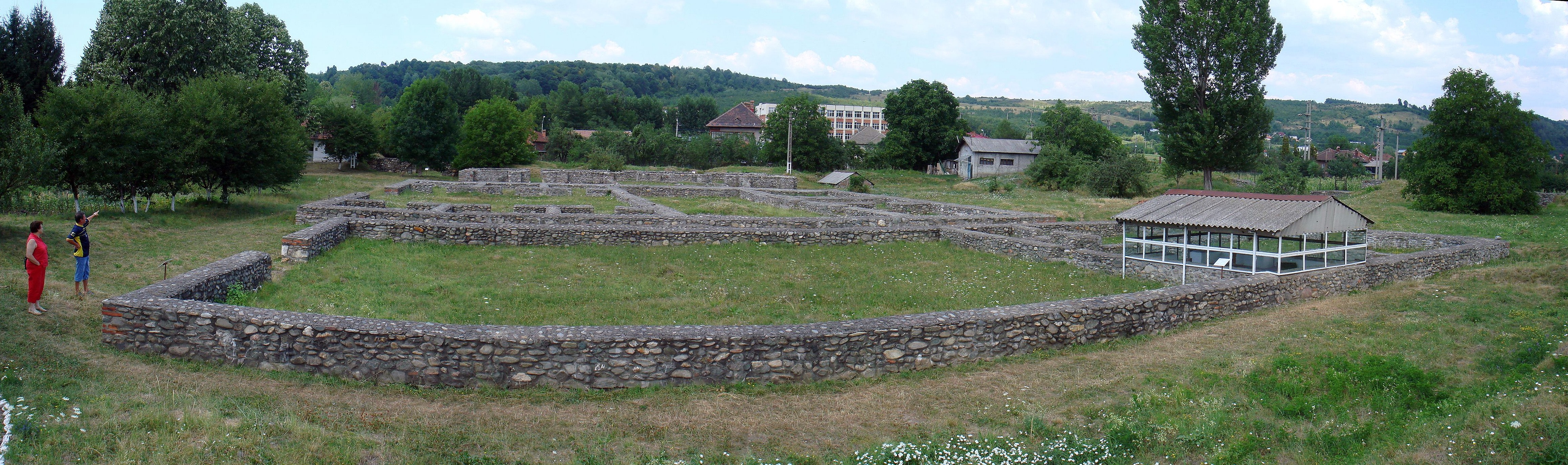
- Panoramic view from porta principalis sinistra: praetorium in front and then principia.

- Location within Romania
- 45°13′14.69″N 25°00′44.95″E
- Location: Apa sărată, Câmpulung, Argeș, Romania

History
- Founded: 190 – 211 AD
- Built: Commodus or Septimius

Site notes
- Excavation dates: 1876; 1962
- Archaeologists: Dimitrie Butculescu
- Discovered: 1876
- Condition: Partially reconstructed

Jidava (or Jidova) was a fort (also called Campulung Muscel fort) in the Roman province of Dacia 4 km southwest of the town of Campulung, Romania. It was built around 190–211 AD as part of the frontier system of the Limes Transalutanus located approximately 20 km south of the Rucăr-Bran pass.

It has been excavated and can be seen today.

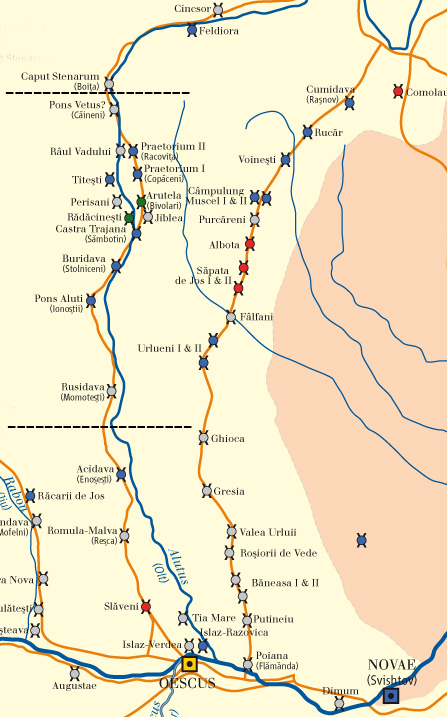
Limes Alutanus + Transalutanus

The site is administered by the Argeș County Museum.

The first wooden buildings were destroyed by a fire dated by coins of Geta and Severus Alexander (222). The stone buildings built afterwards were again destroyed by fire dated by a coin of Philip II (246), the latest coin discovered on the limes.

Small thermal baths were at the NE end of the praetorium, built of brick after the stone praetorium, and overlapping the via sagularis and part of the agger.

== Campulung Muscel II ==
A smaller fort or castellum (Campulung Muscel II) was about 300m to the south at Biserica Jidovilor. Inside, a two-roomed building equipped with a heating system (hypocaust) and traces of wooden barracks have been identified. A date of beginning of the 2nd century is likely.

== Gallery ==
The plan of the castrum

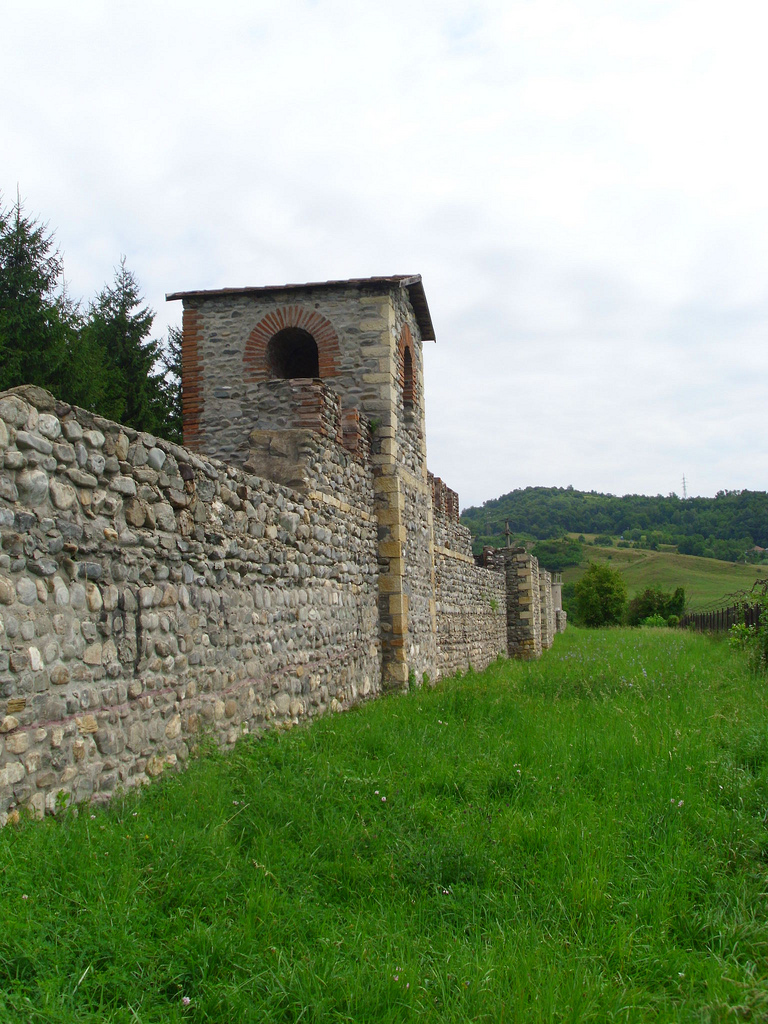
The front of reconstructed wall and tower

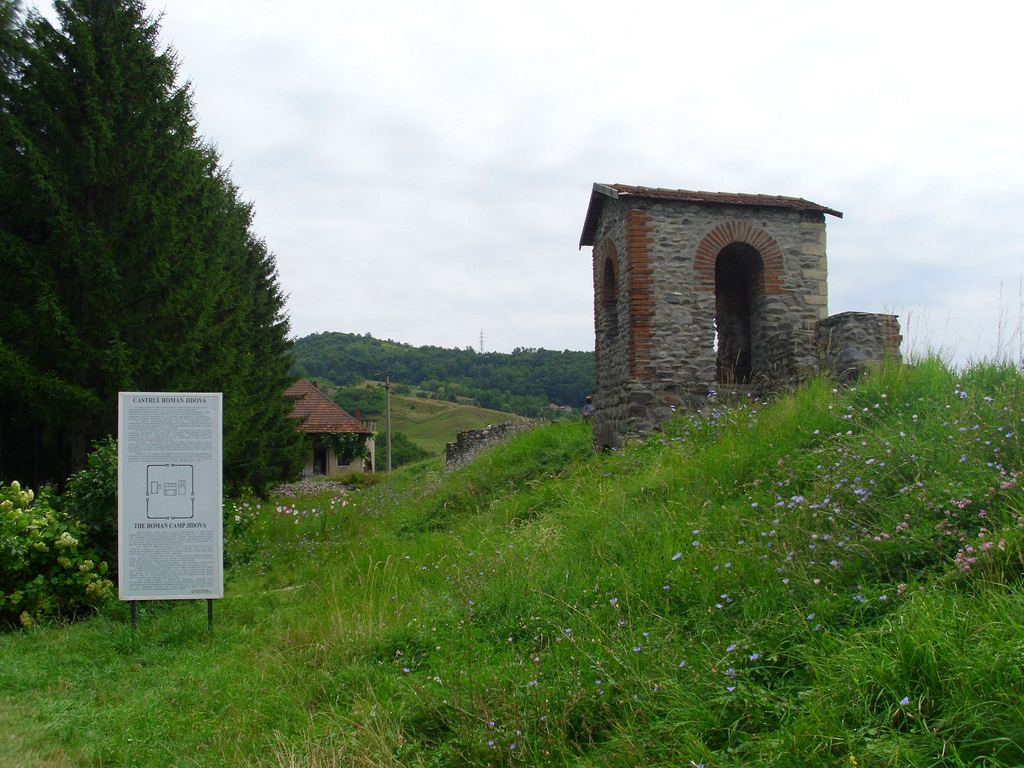
The back of reconstructed wall and tower

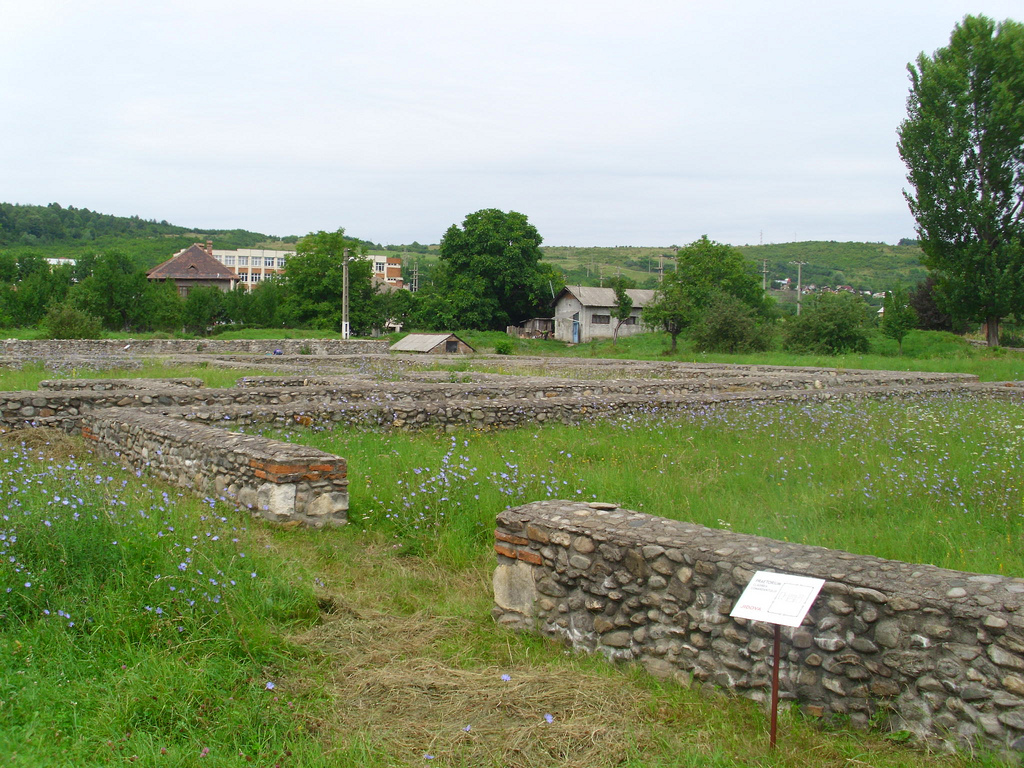
Praetorium

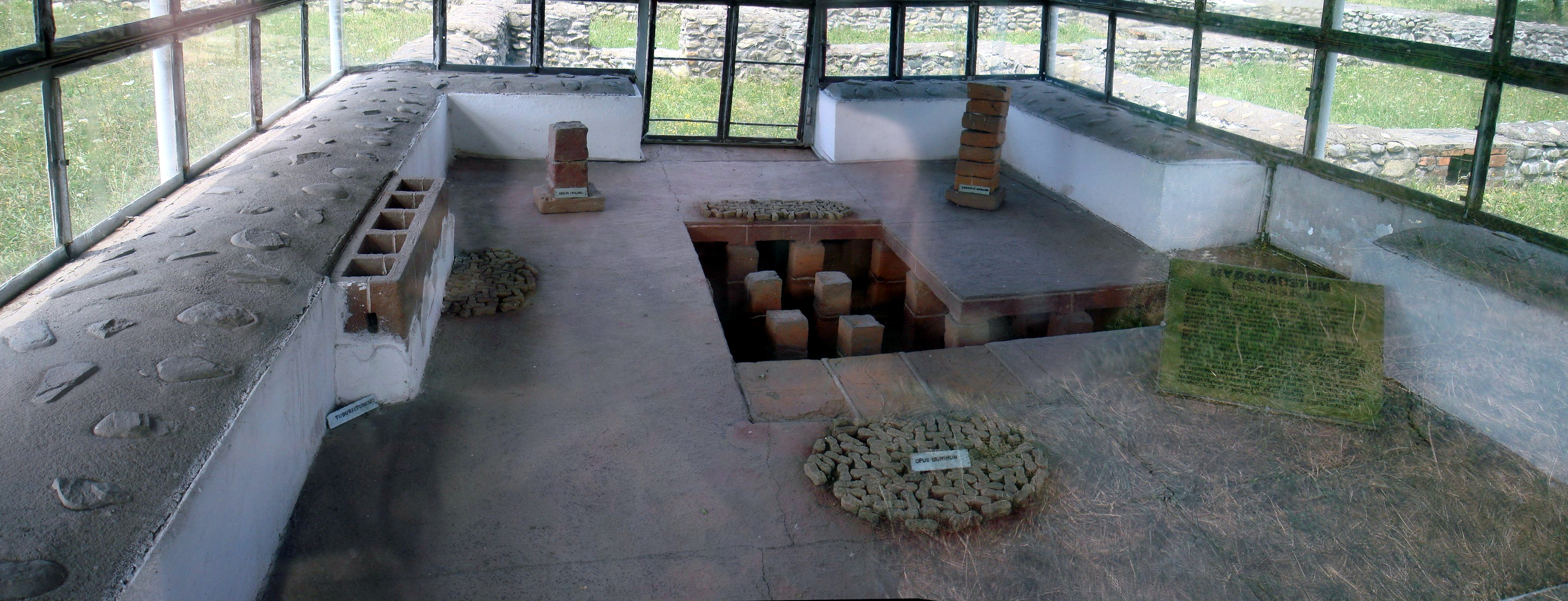
Hypocaust room of Praetorium

== See also ==
- List of castra
