= Romanian Patriarchal Cathedral =

Heritage site in Bucharest, Romania

Coordinates: 44°25′28.54″N 26°5′52.16″E

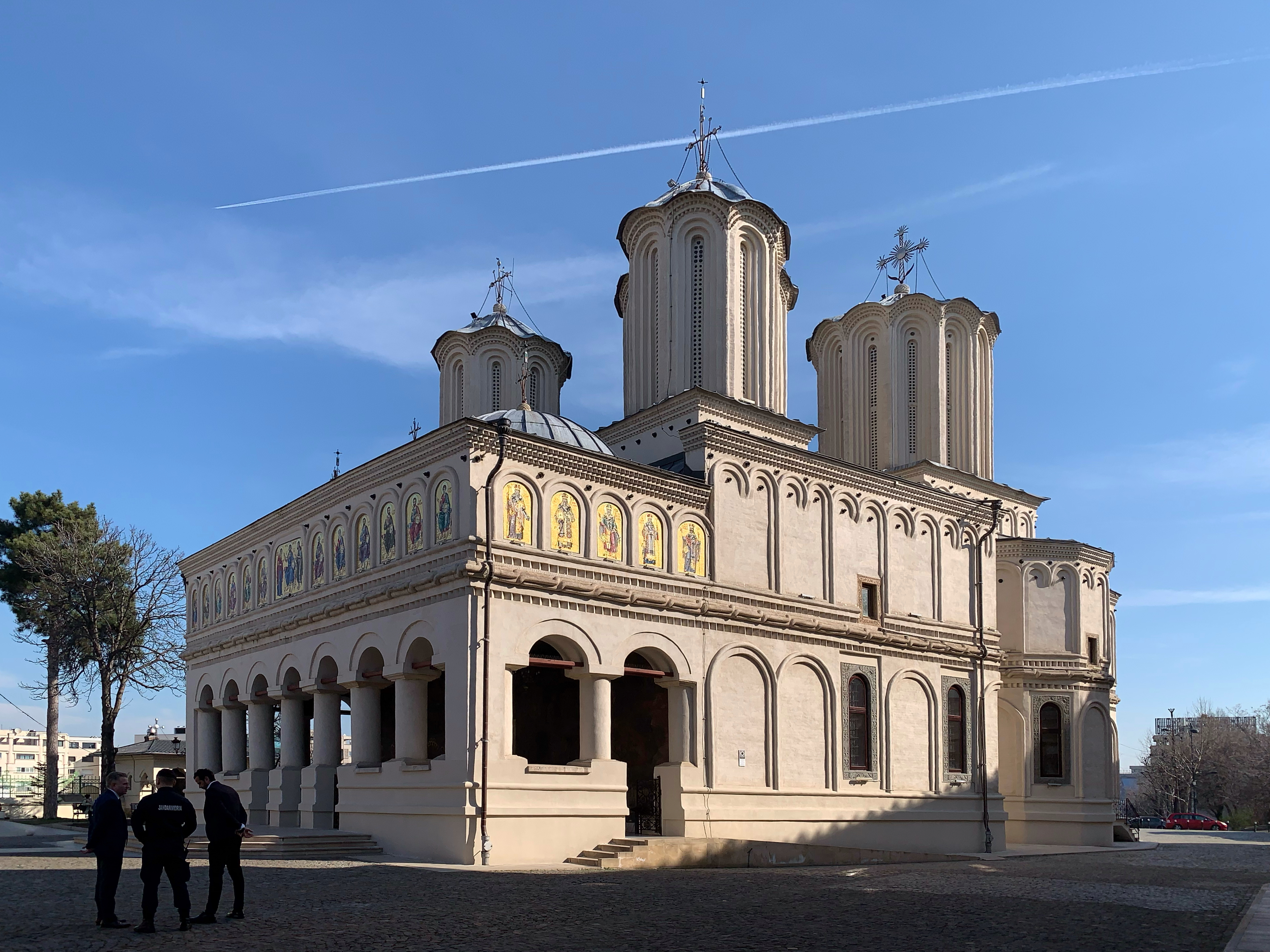
The Cathedral in 2023

The Romanian Orthodox Patriarchal Cathedral (also known as the Metropolitan Church) is a functioning religious and civic landmark on Dealul Mitropoliei, in Bucharest, Romania. It is located near the Palace of the Chamber of Deputies of the Patriarchate of the Romanian Orthodox Church. Since it is a working cathedral, it is the site of many religious holidays and observances that take place for those who follow the Orthodox Christian faith in Bucharest, including a Palm Sunday pilgrimage. The Orthodox Divine Liturgy at the cathedral is known for its a cappella choir, a common practice shared by all the Orthodox churches, in both their prayer services and liturgical rites. The Romanian Orthodox Patriarchal Cathedral is a designated Historical monument—Monument istoric of Romania.

== History ==
The structure was begun in 1655 and completed in 1659 under the orders of the prince Constantin Șerban. The façade is in the Brâncovenesc style. All of the original frescoes and sculptures were destroyed, except for the icon of Constantine and Helen, who are the patron saints of the cathedral. The present-day frescoes were added in 1923 by Dimitrie Belizarie.

In 1862, the Romanian prime minister, Barbu Catargiu, was assassinated as his open carriage passed in front of the cathedral.

== See also ==
- Romanian Orthodox Church

== Gallery ==
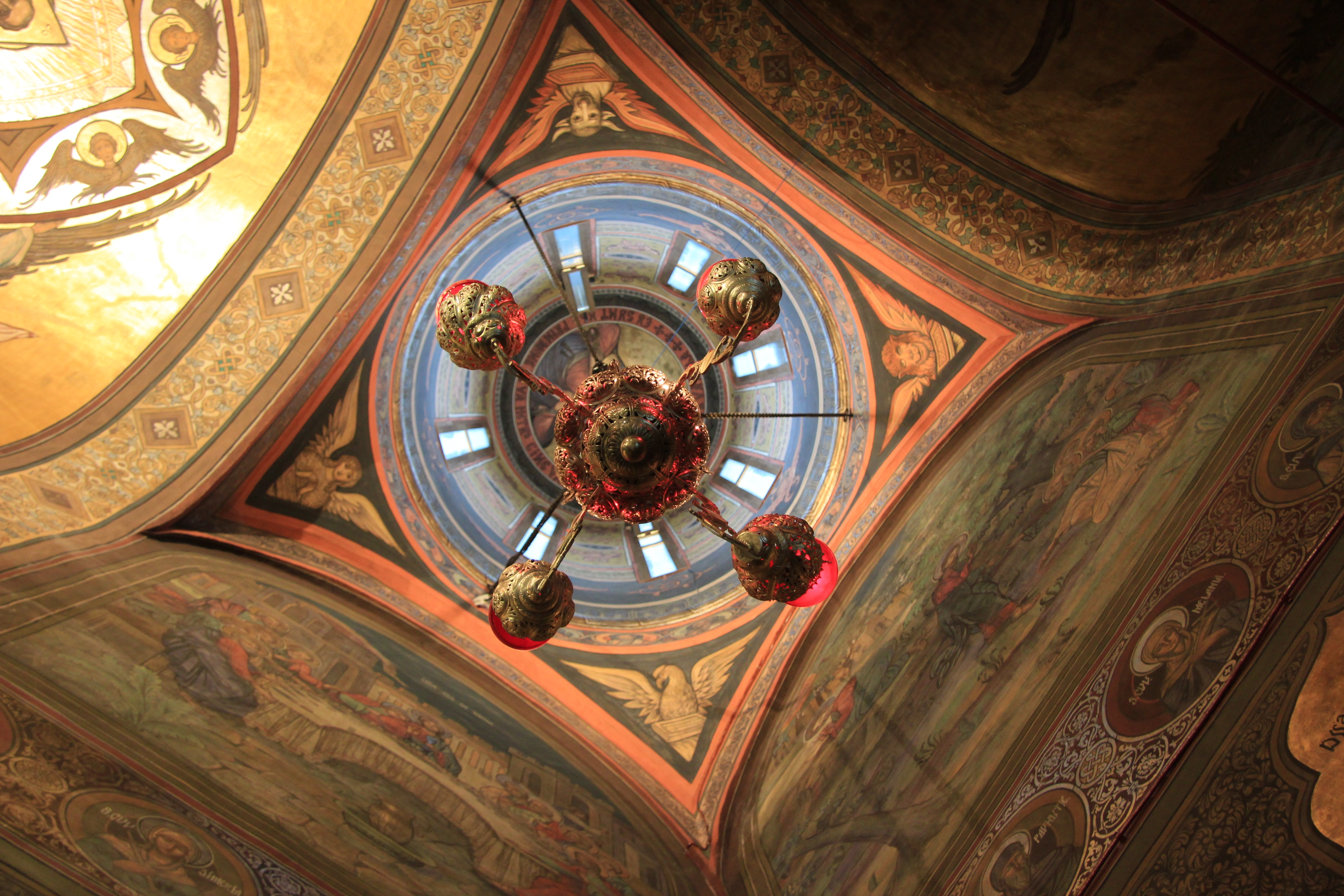
One of the huge chandeliers

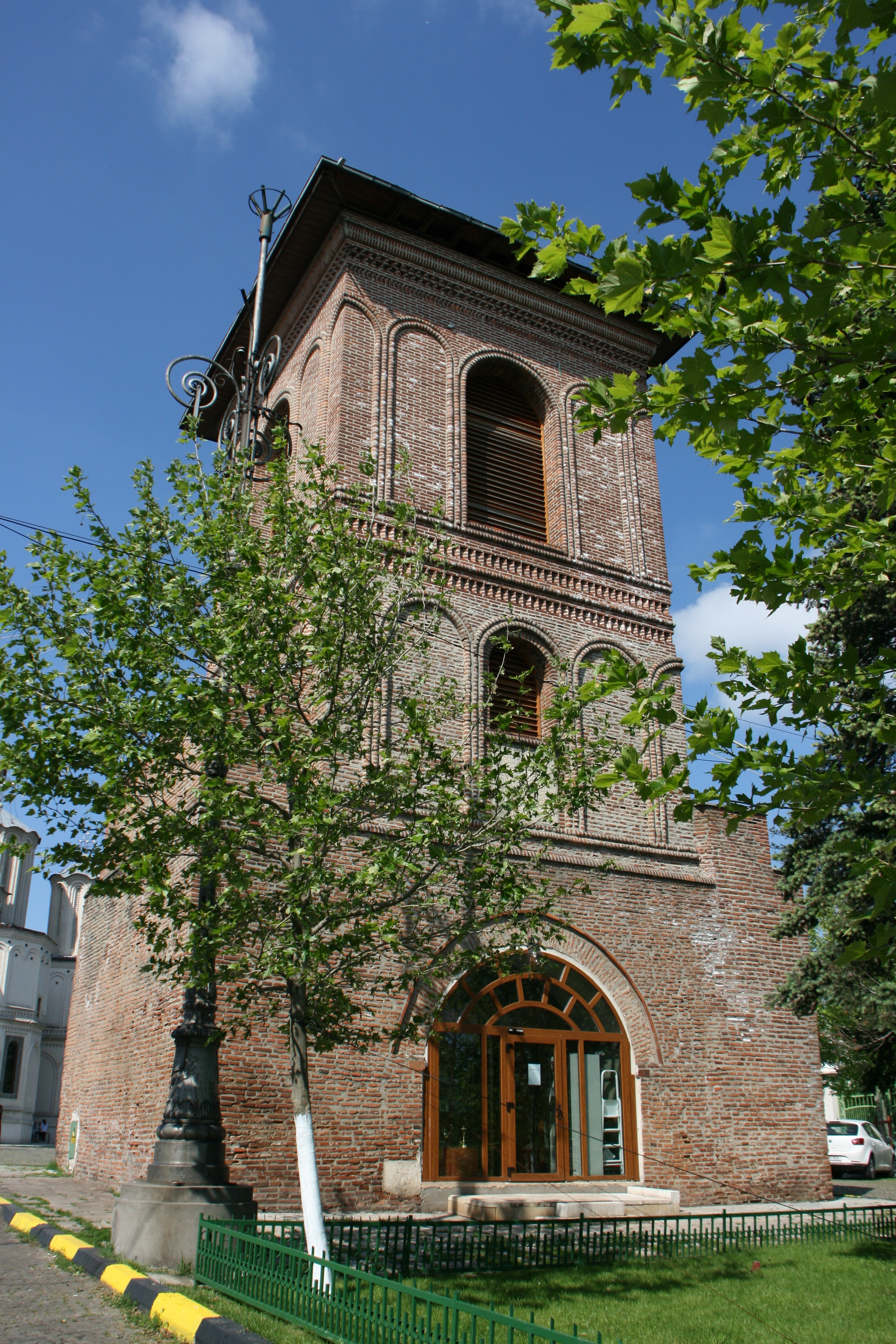
The bell tower

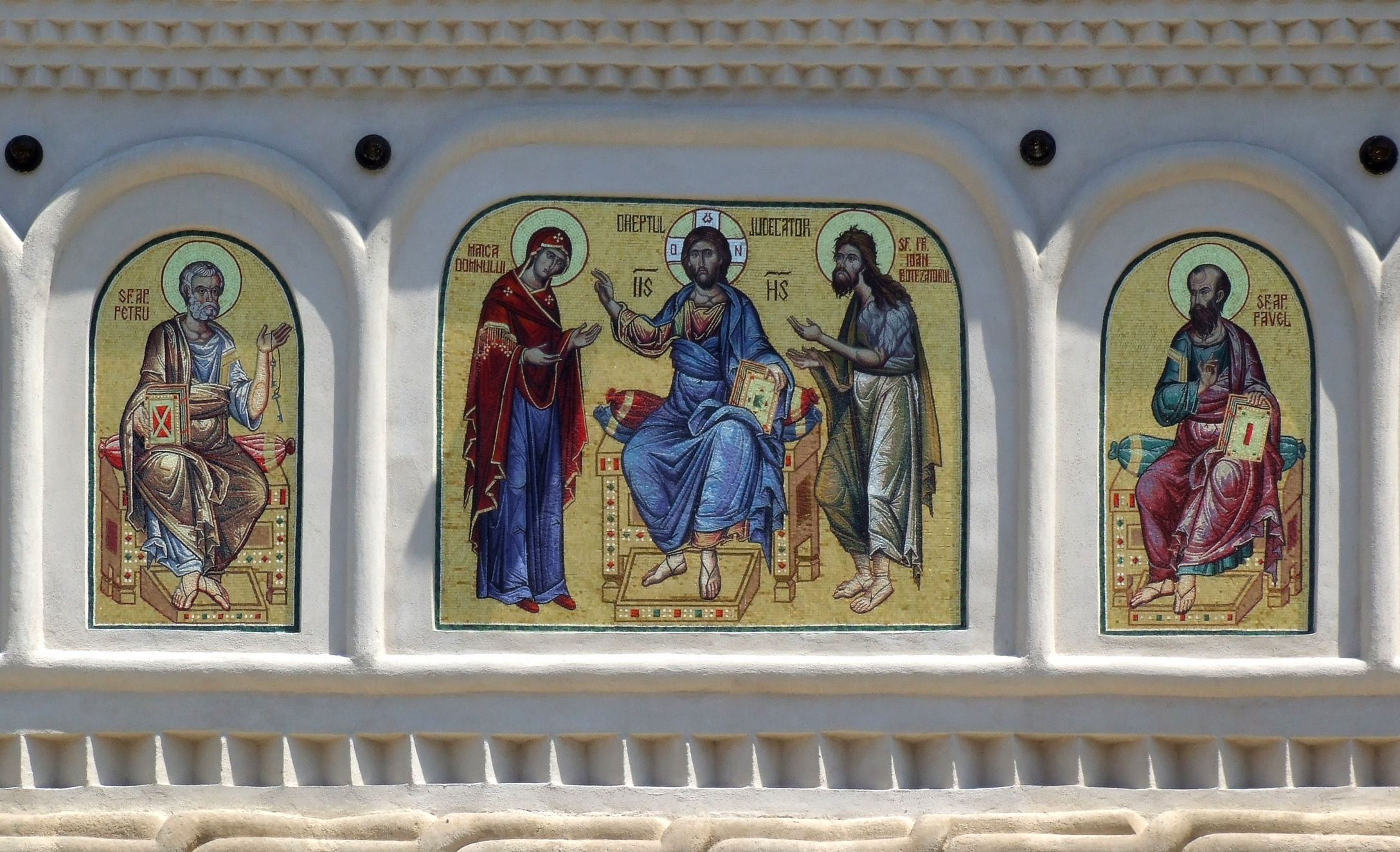
External mosaics

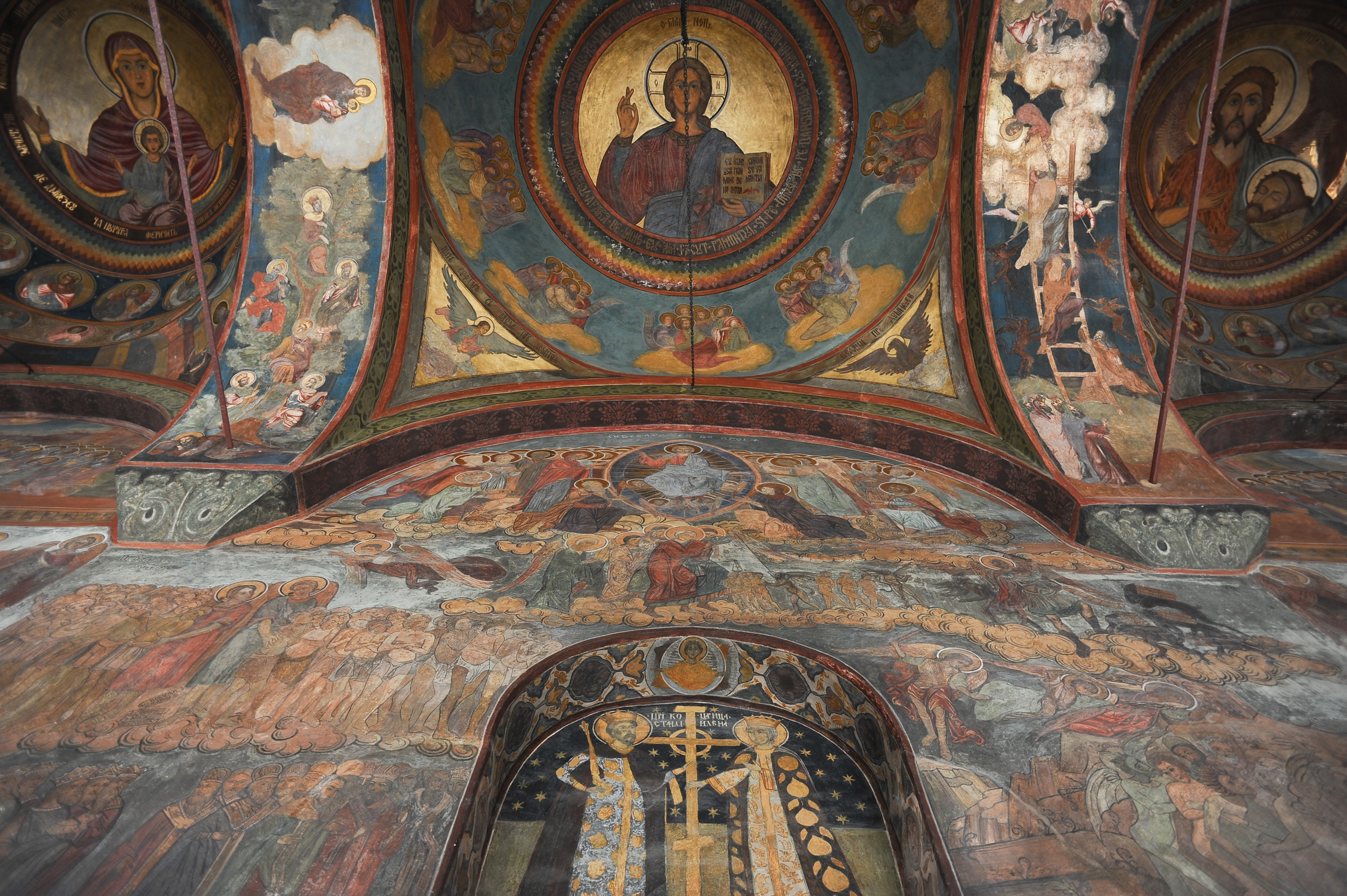
Frescoes on the interior wall

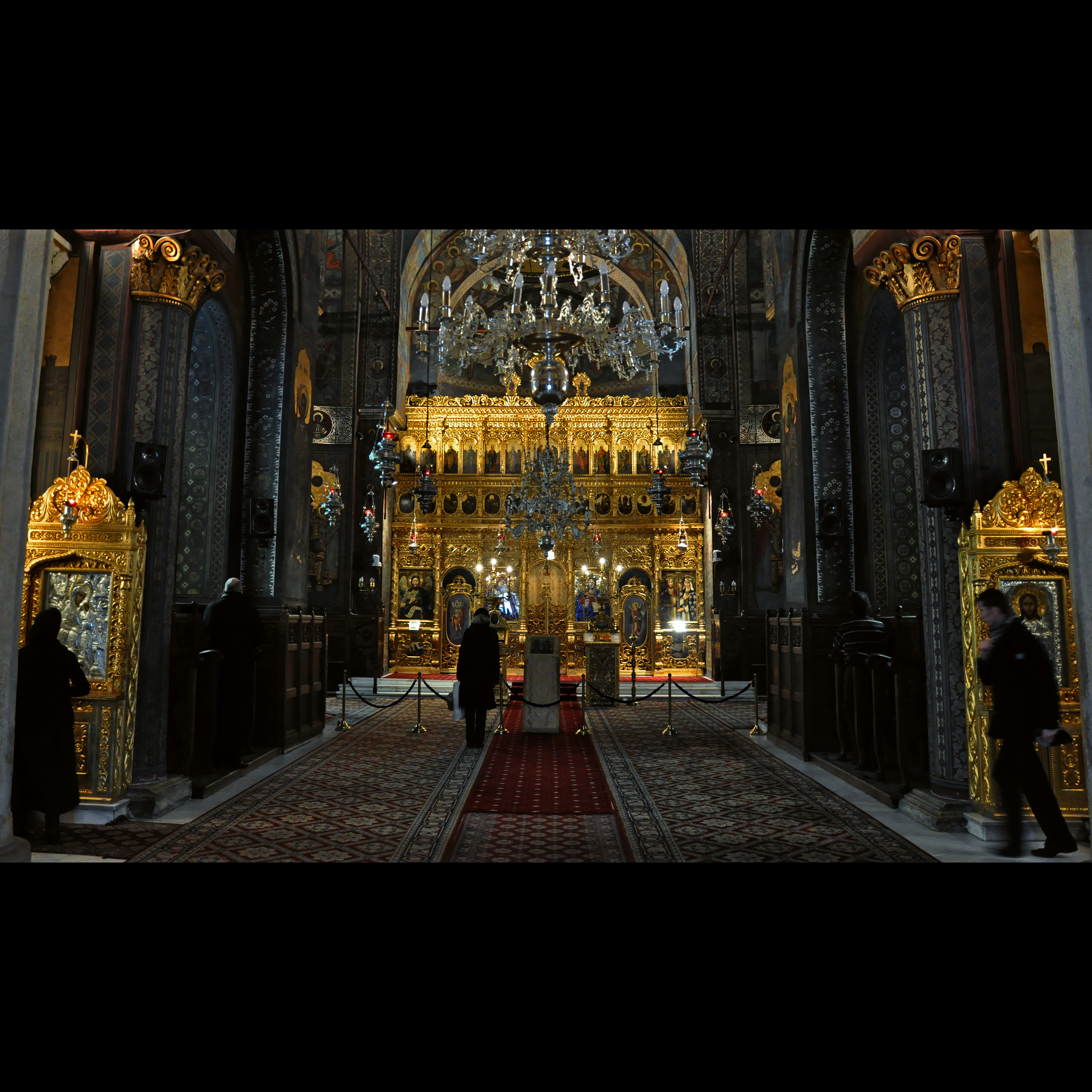
