= Argeș County Museum =

Romanian government institution

Coordinates: 44.8553°N 24.8708°E

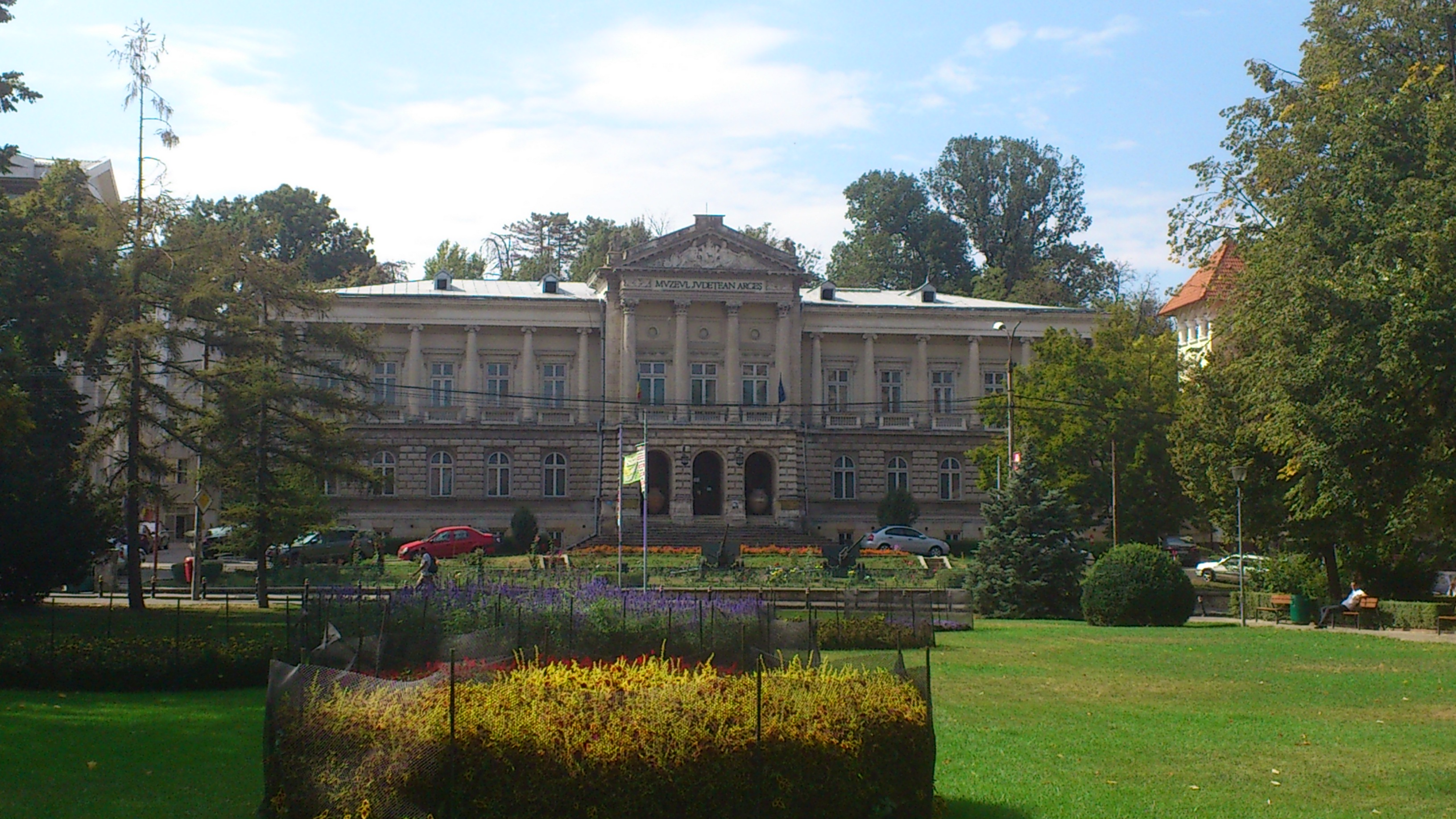
Argeș County Museum

The Argeș County Museum (Romanian: Muzeul Județean Argeș) is a government institution and visitor attraction based in Pitești, Romania. Formally inaugurated in 1955, it is headquartered in an 1890s palace in the city center. Topics of its permanent exhibits include history, ecology, folk art and minerals. Additionally, a fine arts gallery is located in the former city hall, while three other sites elsewhere in the county are also administered by the museum.

== Background and description ==
The museum is headquartered at 44 Armand Călinescu Street, in the former Argeș County Administrative Palace. The structure was built in 1898–1899 according to the plans of architect Dimitrie Maimarolu, while Mihail Manolescu was prefect. The land previously belonged to the Buliga skete, and the funds for construction came in the form of a loan of 140,000 lei from a Bucharest bank, guaranteed by the Dimitrie Sturdza-led Liberal government.

Done in an eclectic style, it fits within the framework of French academicism. The plan is symmetric and U-shaped, with a basement, ground floor and second floor; the building forms an imposing presence in the city center. The grooved columns are both Ionic and composite. The pediment features symbolic bas-reliefs and acroteria. The cornices are denticulate, there is egg-and-dart moulding, as well as meanders, decorative balustrades, semicircular niches, bossage in strong relief and medallions. Local artist Iosef Materna painted the ceiling of the staircase hall. The building housed the Argeș County Prefecture from 1899 to 1950, the Argeș Region Council from 1950 to 1968 and the Argeș County Council from 1968 to 1970. It has been used by the museum since 1970, and is considered a historic monument by the country's Culture Ministry, as are the adjacent park and public garden.

The museum's roots lie in the Gheorghe Ionescu-Gion Popular Athenaeum, which was hosted by a Pitești primary school from 1928 to 1946, and by the Argeș Cultural Center from 1948 to 1950. From 1950 to 1955, its collections were kept in storage. The museum as such was founded in 1955, and was located in the Argeș Tribunal or Cultural Palace from 1955 to 1957 and in the Fostiropol House or Popular Art School from 1957 to 1970, before moving to its present location. The building was expanded in 2000 and in 2004. Permanent exhibitions include fine arts (1971–), folk art (1971–), history (1974–), ecology and environmental protection (1977–), sports (2008–), a planetarium (2008–), mineral crystals (2009–), numismatics (2009–) and an astronomical observatory. There are storage spaces as well as restoration laboratories.

== Annexes ==
Other sites administered by the museum include the Dacian Castrum of Jidava in Câmpulung (1969–), the Dinu Lipatti House at Ciolcești (1985–) and Poenari Castle at Arefu (2009–). The museum formerly had charge of Dâmbovicioara Cave (1960–2002) and the Liviu Rebreanu Memorial House at Valea Mare (1969–2008). The museum has a photographic archive and runs archaeological digs. It also has a specialized library (1957–), a journal (1968–), an annual scientific conference (1970–) and a publishing house (2007–).

While the folk art section is located in the main building, the fine arts gallery, named after Rudolf Schweitzer-Cumpăna, has been housed since 1970 at the old city hall on 33 Republicii Boulevard. The building is itself a historic monument, as is the abutting park. Planned by architect Ion N. Socolescu and built in 1885–1886, it is in the French style of the time, with a ground floor and upper story. The main entrance is surrounded by four columns, the central hallway has a wide staircase, and the interior features decorative elements such as stucco ornamentation. The ceiling of the former city council room was also painted by Materna. Among the artists in the gallery's collection are Theodor Aman, Nicolae Grigorescu, Sava Henția, Jean Alexandru Steriadi, Camil Ressu, Dumitru Ghiață, Ion Țuculescu, Vasile Popescu, Ștefan Luchian and Schweitzer-Cumpăna. Funding sources for the museum include the Argeș County Council and the Culture Ministry.

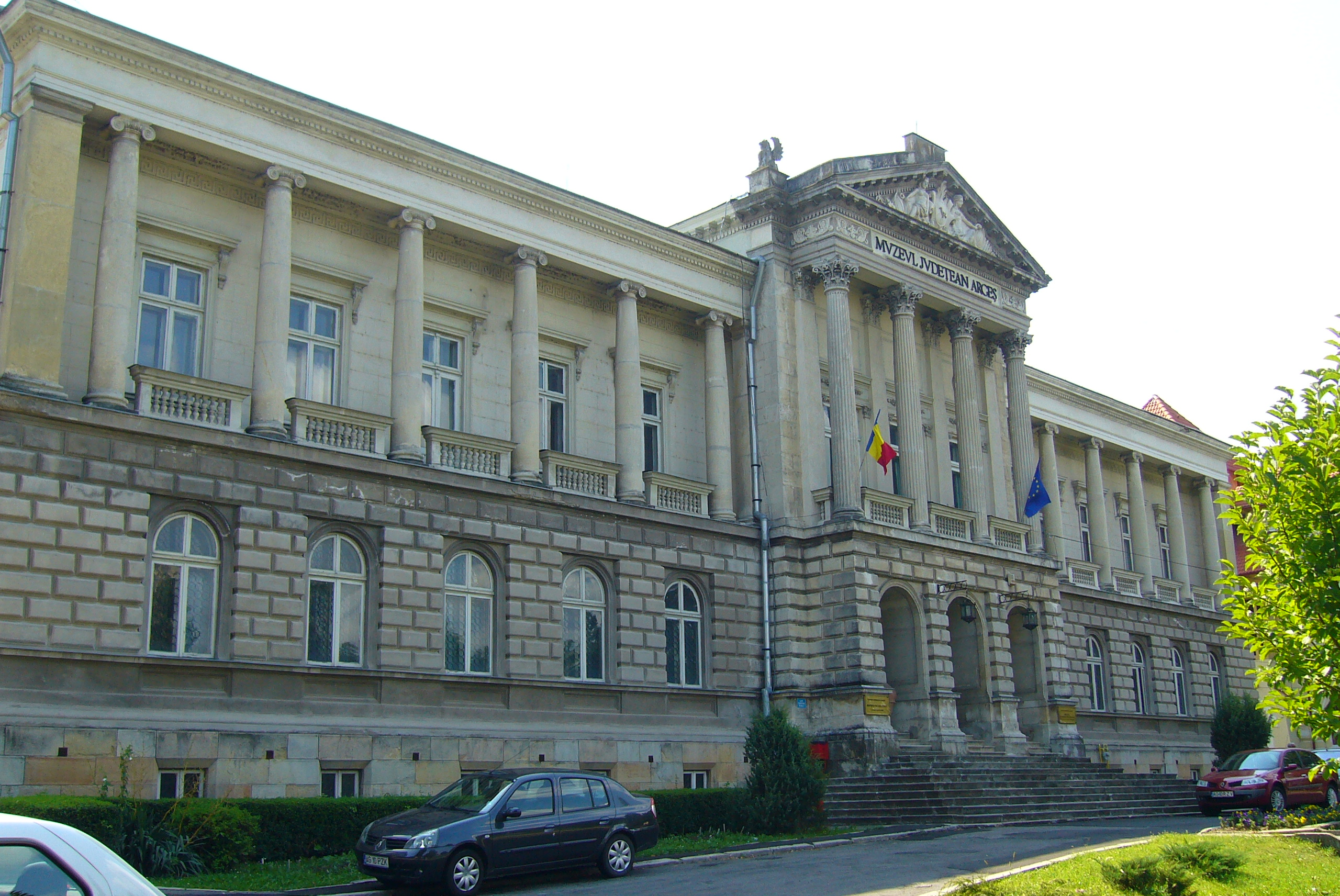
Side view

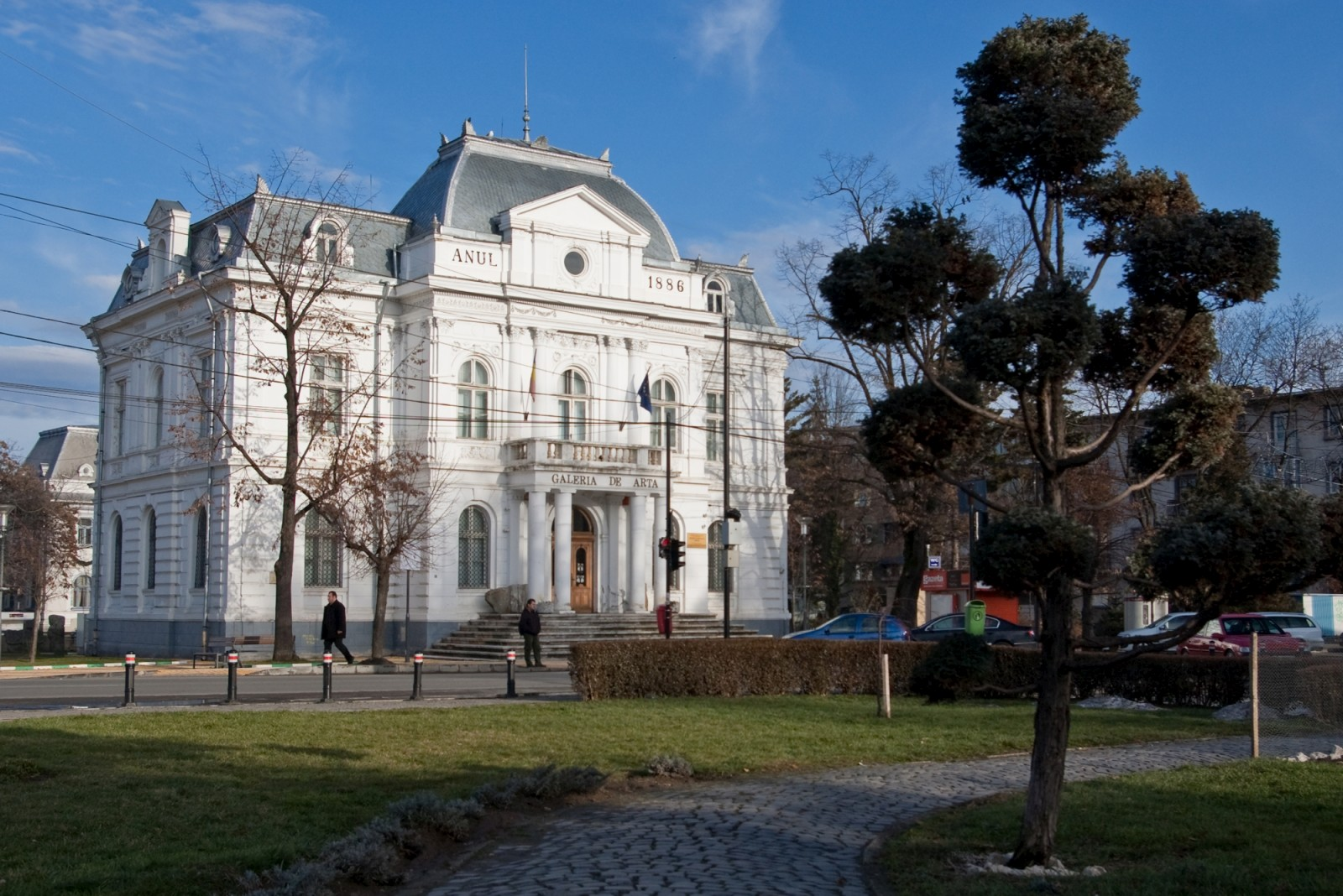
Art museum

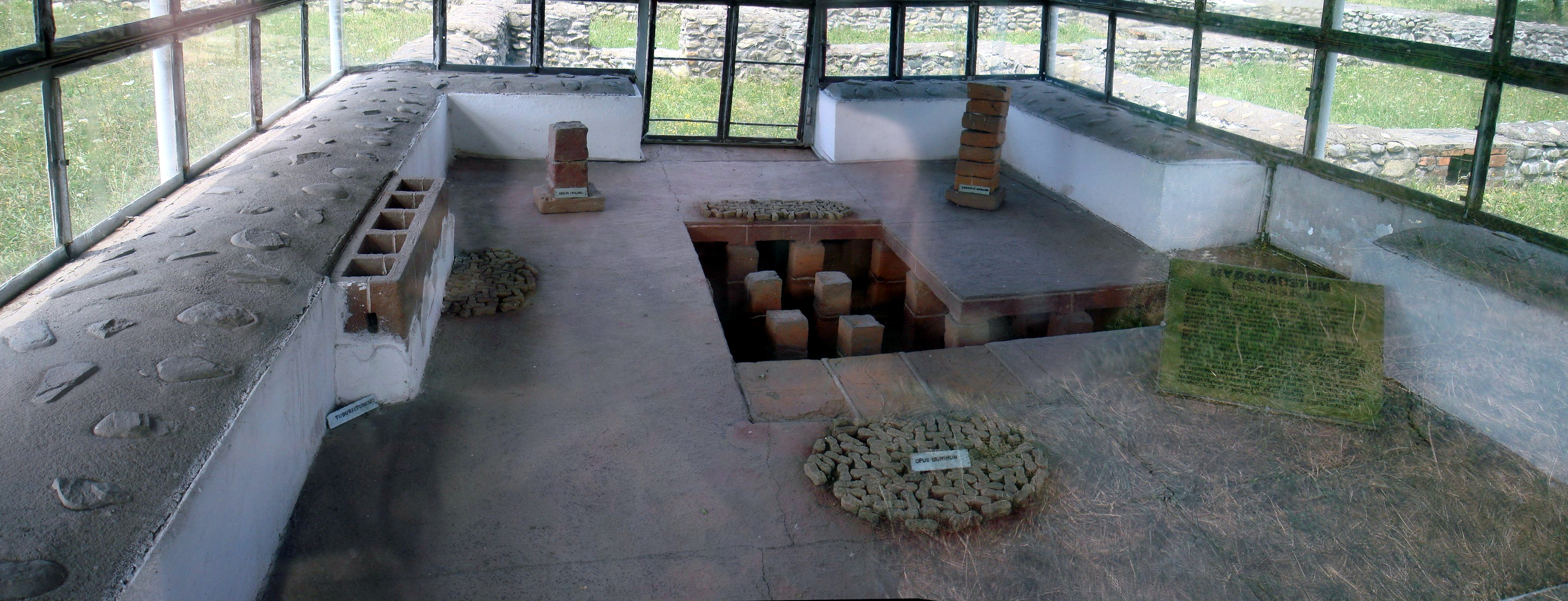
Hypocaust at Jidava

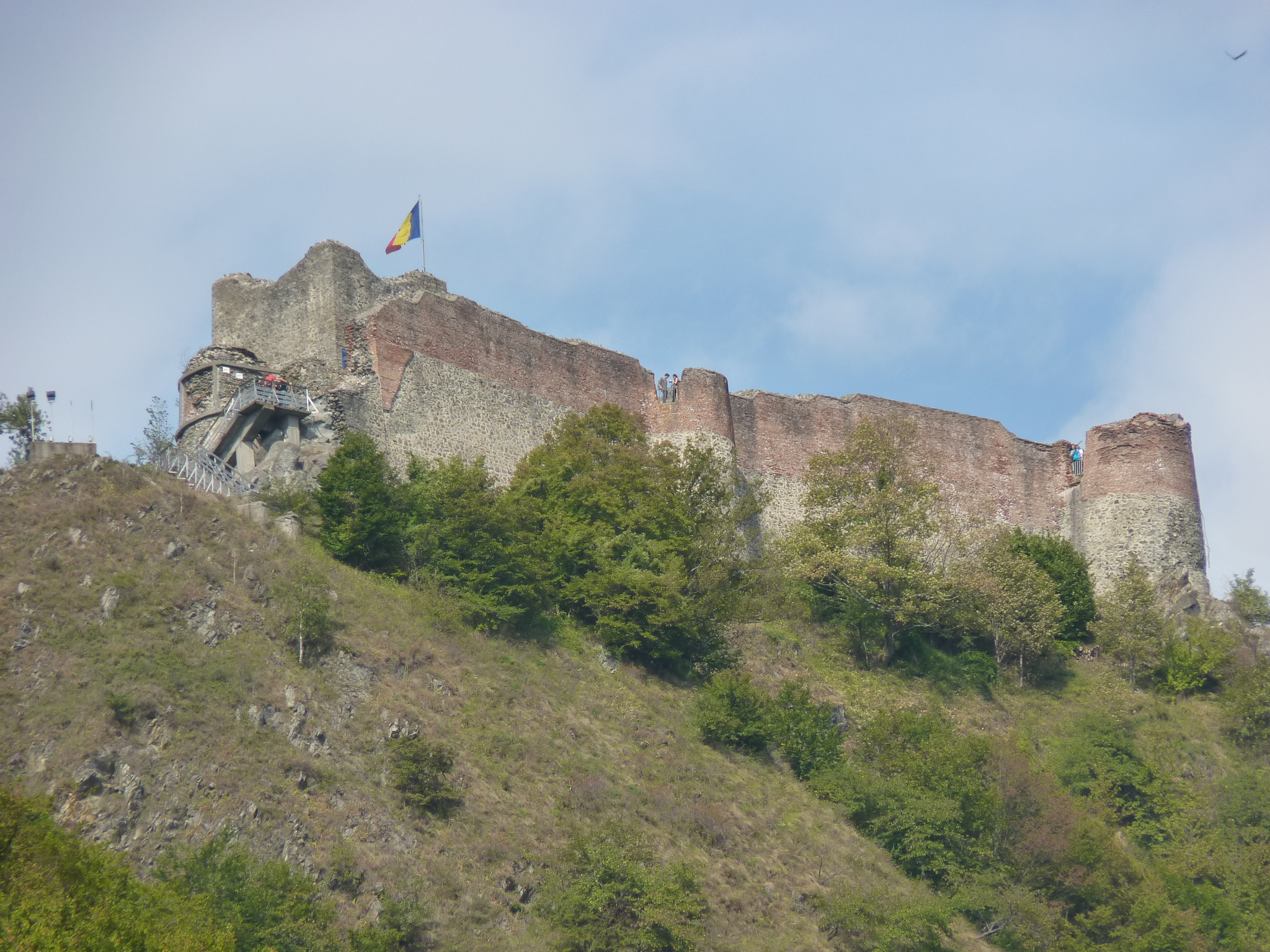
Poenari Castle
