= Palace of the Patriarchate =

Heritage site in Bucharest, Romania

Coordinates: 44.42406°N 26.09789°E

Palace of the Patriarchate Palatul Patriarhiei
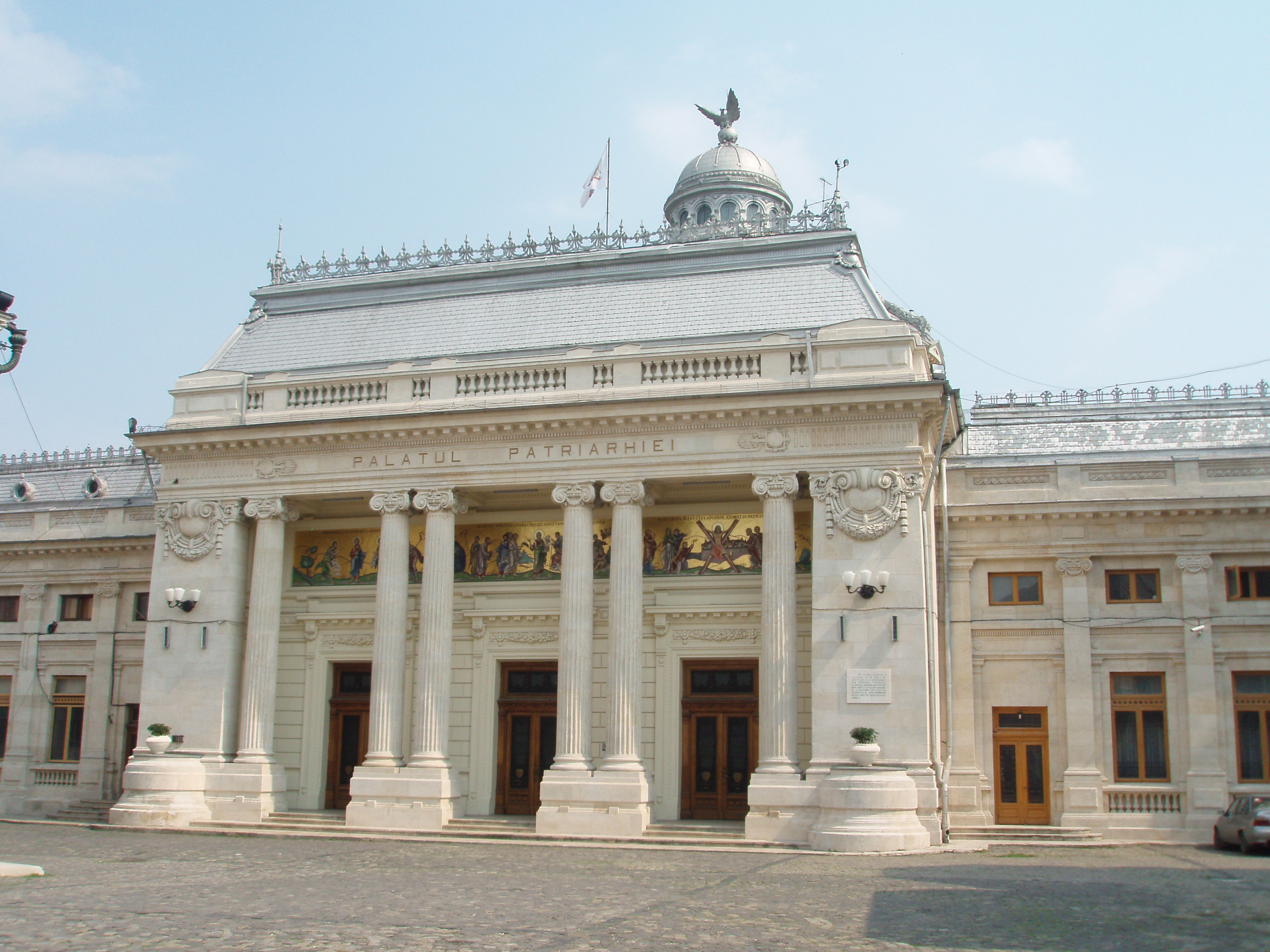
- Interactive map of the Palace of the Patriarchate; Palatul Patriarhiei area

General information
- Location: Bucharest, Romania
- Completed: 1907

Design and construction
- Architect: Dimitrie Maimarolu
- Engineer: George Constantinescu

The Palace of the Chamber of Deputies (Romanian: Palatul Camerei Deputaților), now the Palace of the Patriarchate (Palatul Patriarhiei), and also known as the Palace of the Great National Assembly (Palatul Marii Adunări Naționale) during the Communist regime, is a building in Bucharest, Romania, located on the plateau of Dealul Mitropoliei. The building served as the seat of successive Romanian legislatures: of the Assembly of Deputies during the Kingdom of Romania, then of the Communist-era Great National Assembly, and after the Romanian Revolution of 1989, of the Chamber of Deputies. Parliamentarians vacated the building in 1997, when it passed to the Patriarchate of the Romanian Orthodox Church.

== History ==
The earliest information about the hill on which the Palace would be built dates to about 1650. At that time, Dealul Mitropoliei, later Dealul Patriarhiei, was covered in grapevines owned by the country's voivodes, with others belonging to the Metropolitanate's monks. The idea of placing the seat of legislative power in the middle of a religious complex was not mere coincidence, but has its roots in customs of the period. According to these customs, the Metropolitan was ex officio president of the boyars, the only citizens with the right to vote, when assembled in formal session. Moreover, it was necessary to have the seat of legislative power on the hill because by tradition, the Metropolitan could not leave his residence. Consequently, the practice of organising legislative meetings at the Metropolitanate became entrenched, so that part of the monks' cells were transformed into a building that could accommodate official legislative sessions.

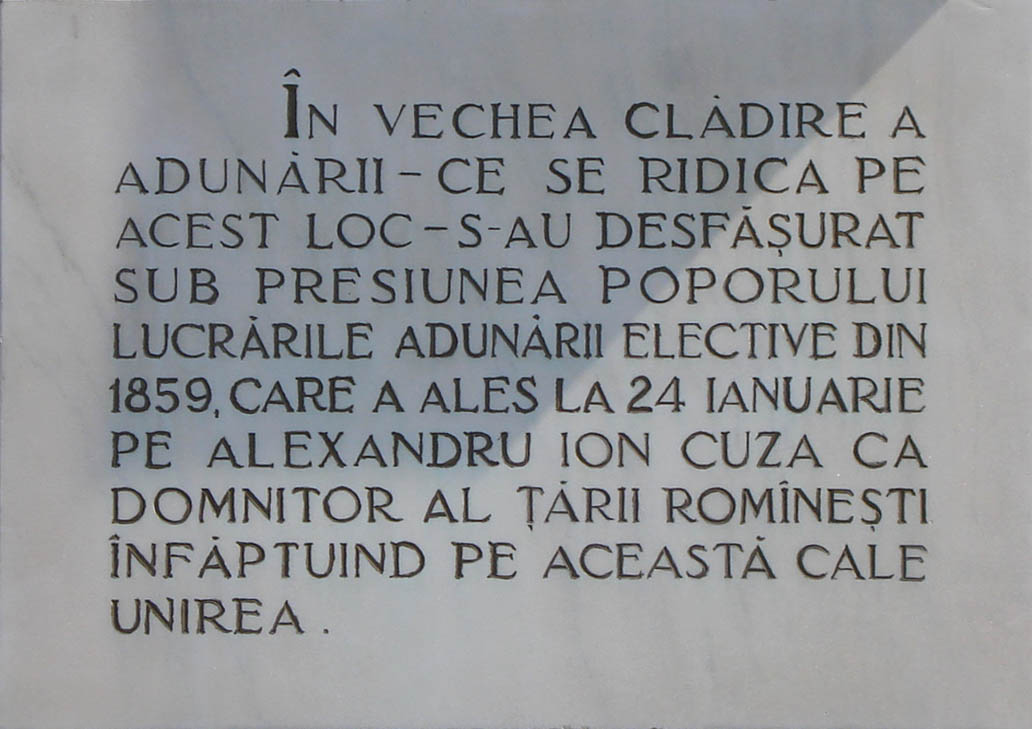
Commemorative plaque located on the palace façade. It reads: "In the old assembly building on this site the electoral assembly met under popular pressure in 1859, electing Alexandru Ion Cuza prince of Wallachia on 24 January and achieving union in this way."

In 1881 the old building, which had housed the princely divan, was repaired and refurbished. To this structure, which originated in the modified monastic cells, was added an amphitheatre similar to that which would soon be found in Berlin's Reichstag building. The amphitheatre was large, well-decorated, spacious, and had two sets of private viewing boxes and a gallery. The deputies attended meetings in a session hall, seated in a semicircle; in front of them was a speaker's platform, to the right of which was the ministers' bench.

The building was open for public visiting only at hours when the legislature was not meeting, following an agreement won by a bureaucrat working there. Romanian citizens could attend legislative sessions only if a deputy signed their entrance ticket; foreign citizens needed a signature from their country's embassy.

In 1907, the former princely divan building was replaced with the present-day palace; Dimitrie Maimarolu was the architect.

== Description ==
The façade, done in a neo-classical style, is 80 m long. The imposing ground floor is dominated by the centre of the façade, the entrance area, detached and having a peristyle featuring six Ionic columns, the four in the centre grouped as pairs. The cupola, similar to that of the Romanian Athenaeum and located above the assembly hall, is raised, fitted with windows, and topped by an eagle; it forms the palace's central axis. The main façade has two side wings, architecturally subordinate to the entrance.

The side façade, on the northeast, is symmetrical and its ordered style confers upon it an imposing status. It is decorated with pilasters on two levels, these being decorated and dominant on the sides.

When seen from United Nations Street, the palace's four levels can be observed. The first level has the appearance of a massive base and is made of stone; the second is powerfully carved; and above this is the level through which one enters the main façade, coming from the cathedral.
