= Gorj County Prefecture =

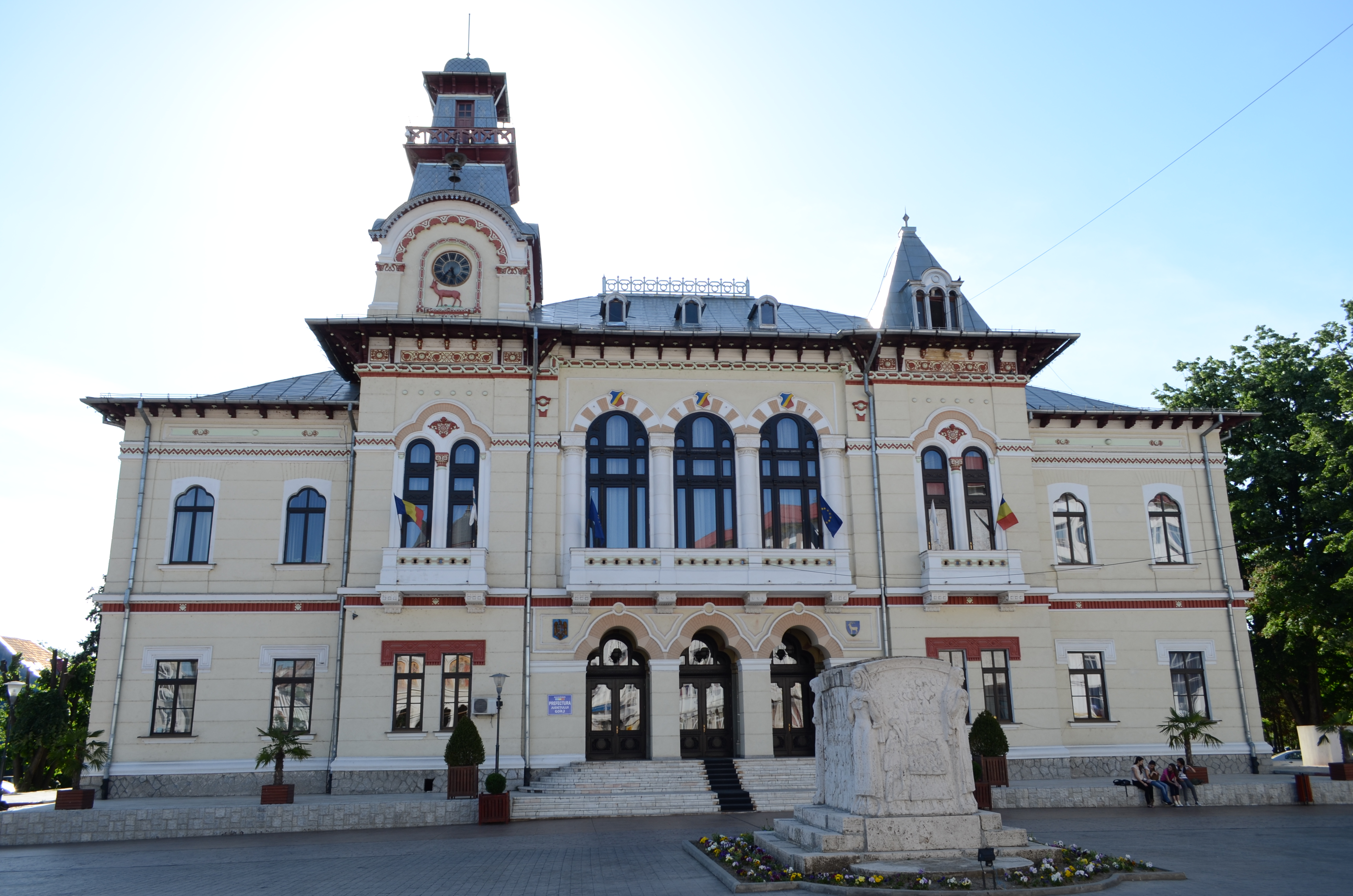
Gorj County Prefecture

The Gorj County Prefecture (Romanian: Prefectura Județului Gorj) is a building in Târgu Jiu, Romania, housing the offices of the Gorj County prefect. It is located at 4 Piața Victoriei.

The building sits on the site of a demolished prison and several private lots. Designed by Petre Antonescu, it was originally the city hall. The cornerstone was laid in 1898, in the presence of Crown Prince Ferdinand. Dimitrie Maimarolu laid the finishing touches in 1902. It has Moorish Revival touches on both exterior and interior. A telephone network was installed in 1904, while a clock was mounted in the tower in 1905. In 1968, when Gorj County was reintroduced, the wings were torn down while new office space was added in the rear.

Romania's Culture Ministry classifies the building as a historic monument.
