= Armenian Church, Bucharest =

Coordinates: 44°26′15″N 26°06′39″E

The Armenian Church
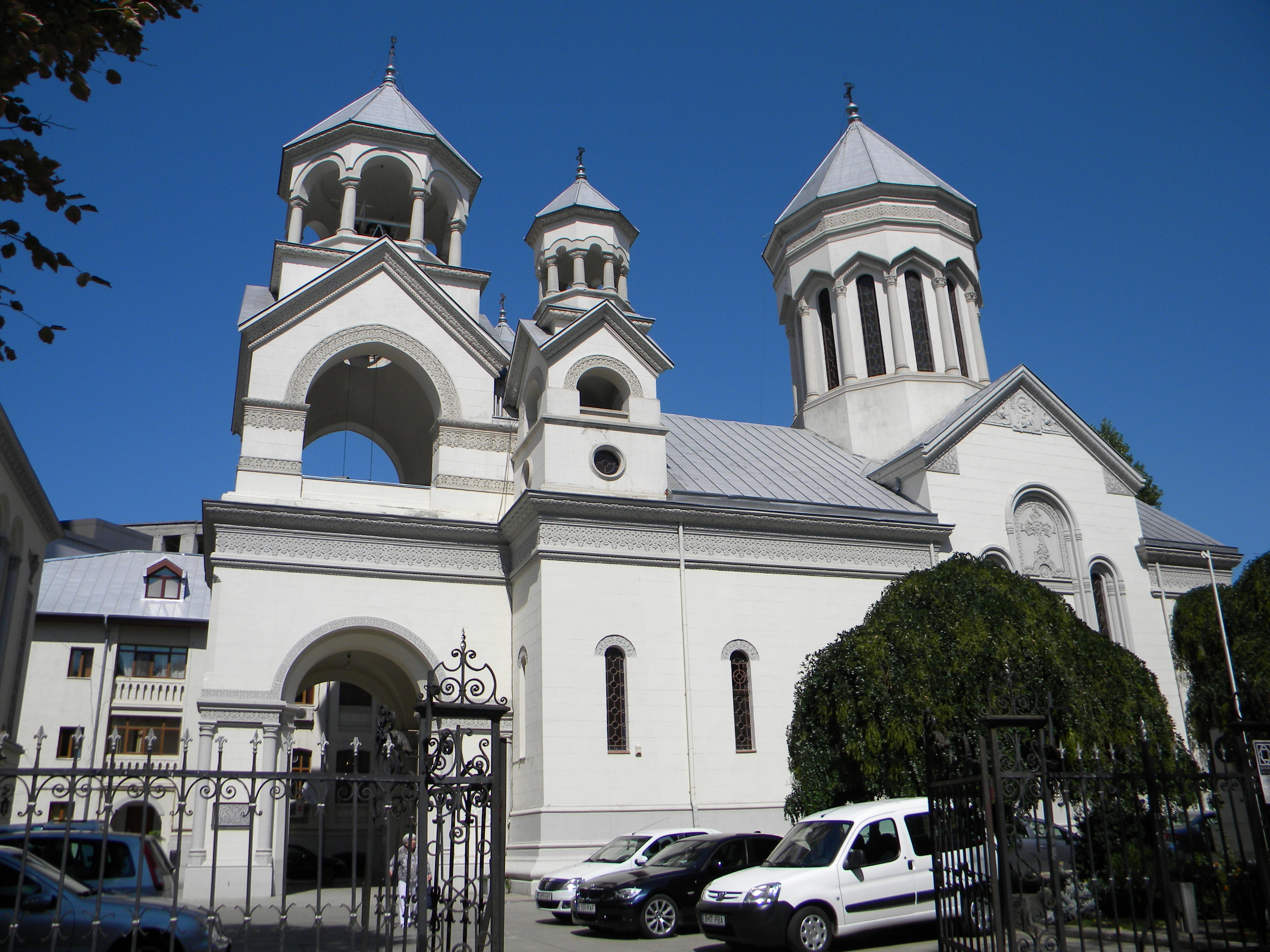
- The church in 2013
- The Armenian Church
- Address: Bd. Carol I, nr. 43, Sector 2
- Country: Romania
- Language(s): Classical Armenian, Armenian
- Denomination: Armenian Apostolic Church
- Tradition: Oriental Orthodox

History
- Status: Parish church

Architecture
- Architect(s): Grigore Mithridate Buiucliu; Dimitrie Maimarolu; Grigore Cerchez
- Style: Armenian architecture
- Groundbreaking: 1911
- Completed: 1915

The Armenian Church (Romanian: Biserica Armenească) is an Armenian Apostolic church located at 43 Carol I Boulevard in Bucharest, Romania. It is dedicated to the Archangels Michael and Gabriel.

== Presentation ==
The cornerstone was laid in July 1911, and building proceeded according to the plans of architects Dimitrie Maimarolu and Grigore Cerchez, who was of Armenian origin. The design resembles Etchmiadzin Cathedral. Work was completed in September 1915. In the yard, the surrounding complex includes a bishop's residence, a library and diocesan museum, a cultural center, a kindergarten, and the Union of Armenians of Romania headquarters.

The church is listed as a historic monument by Romania's Ministry of Culture and Religious Affairs, as are the library and the statue of Andranik.

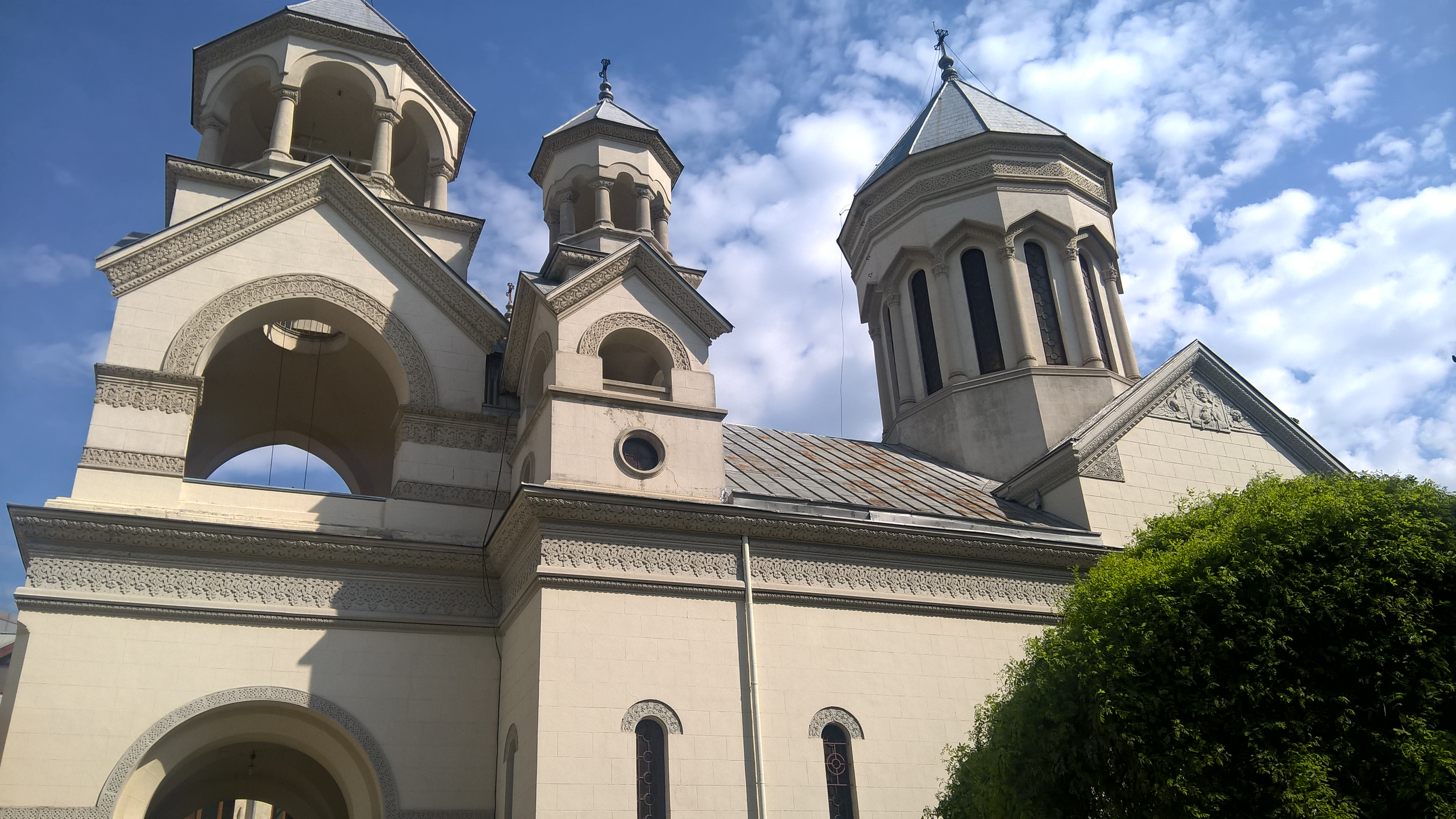
Exterior

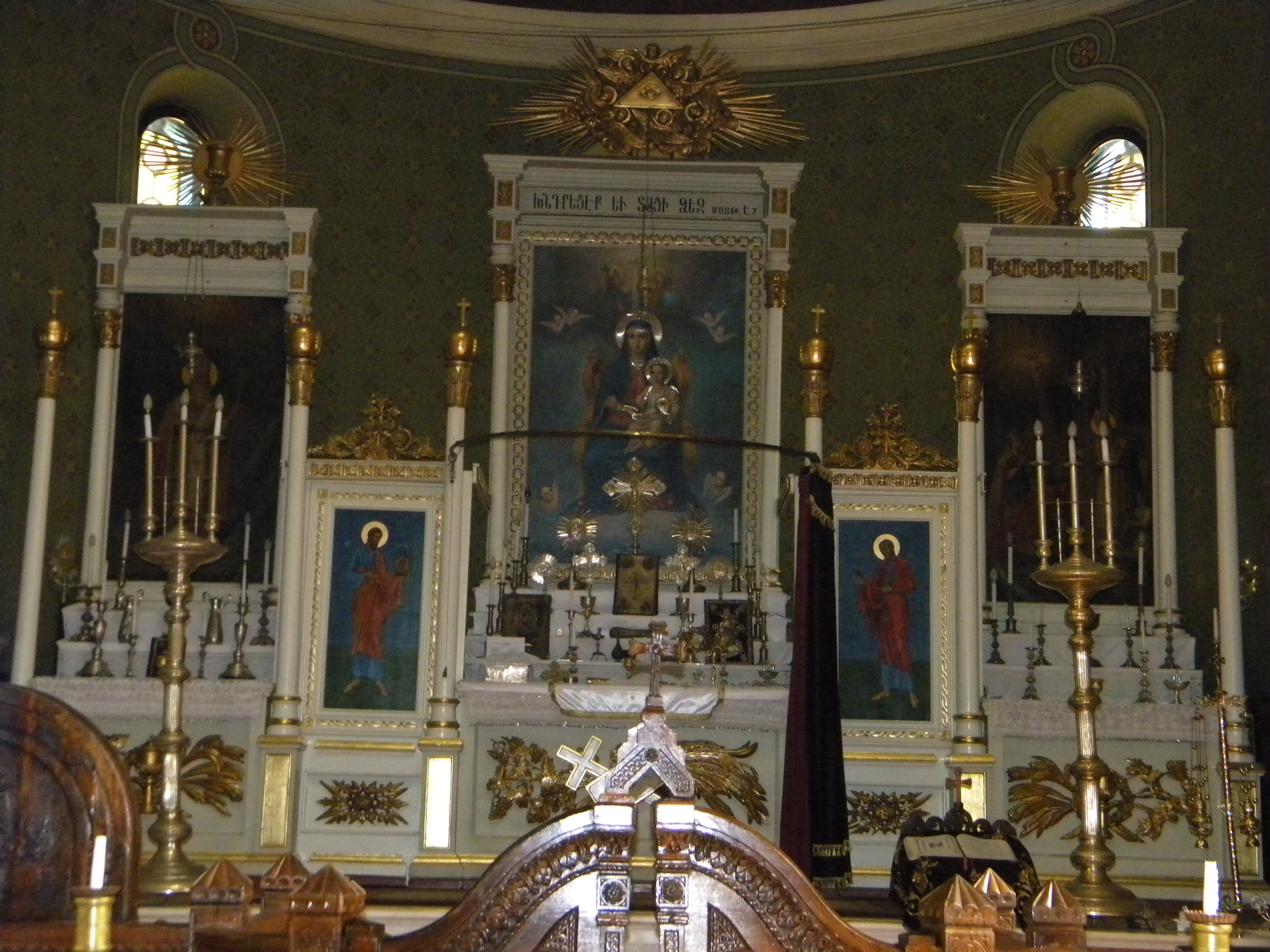
Interior

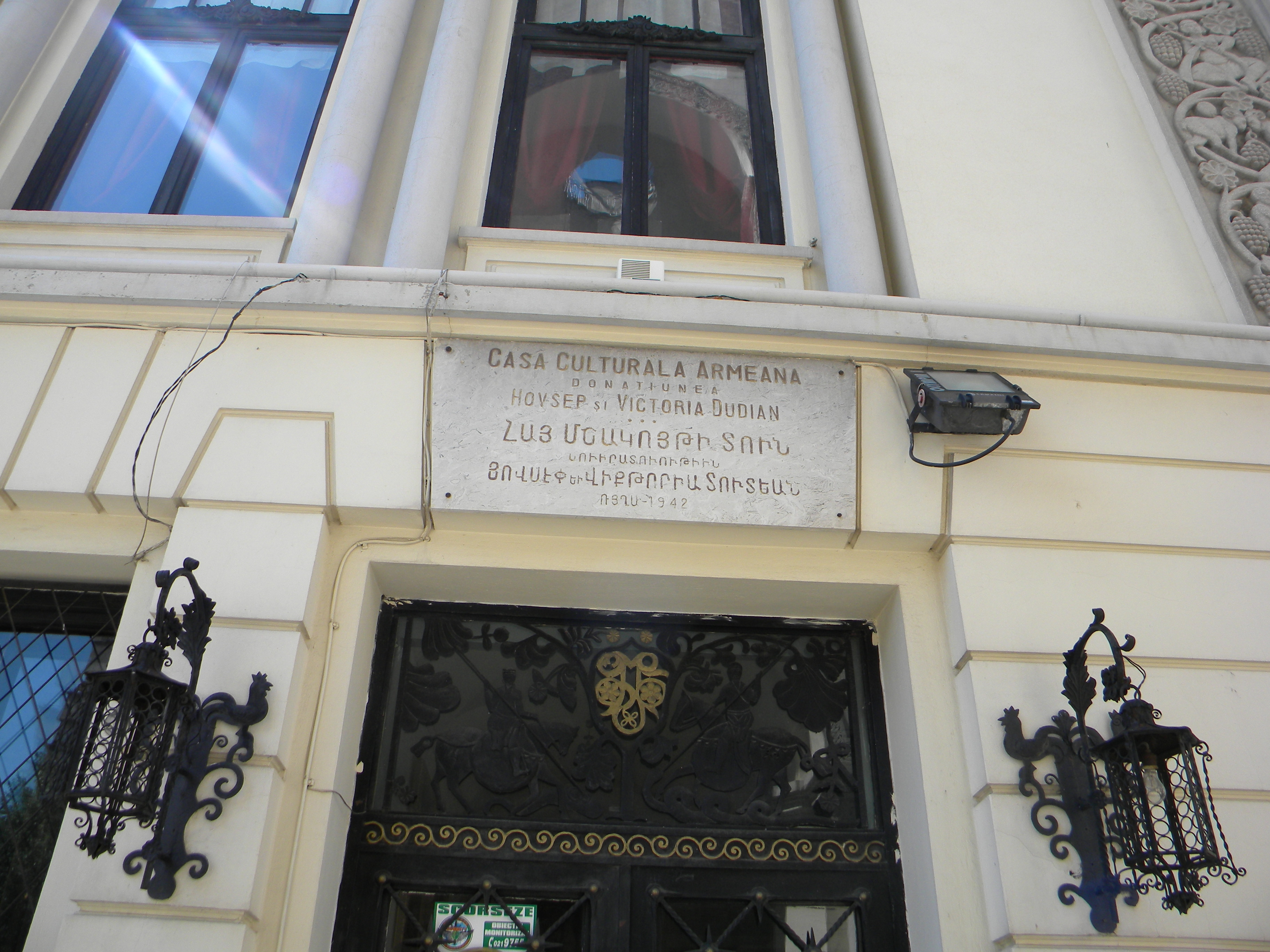
Cultural center entrance

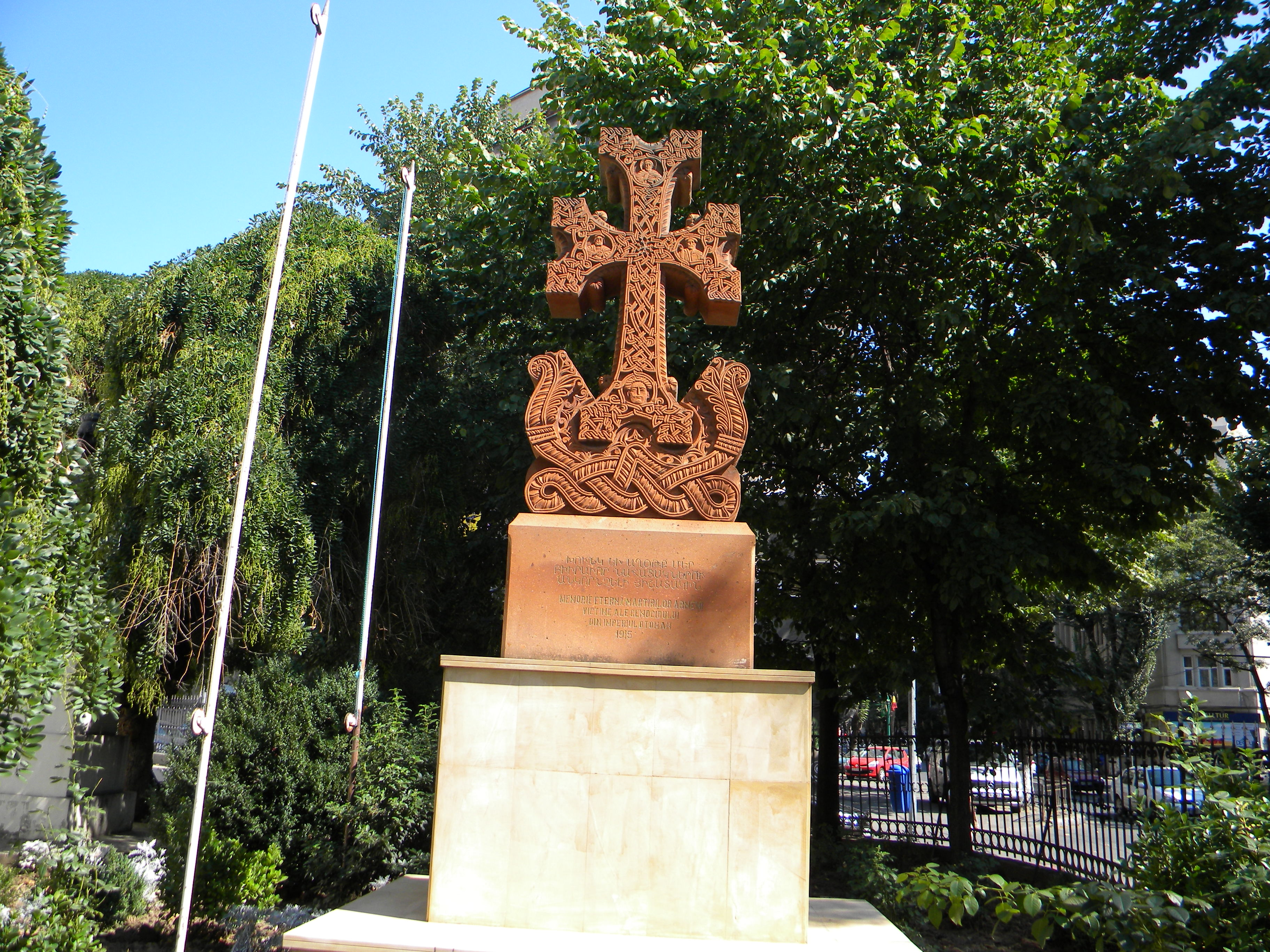
Cross in memory of the Armenian genocide

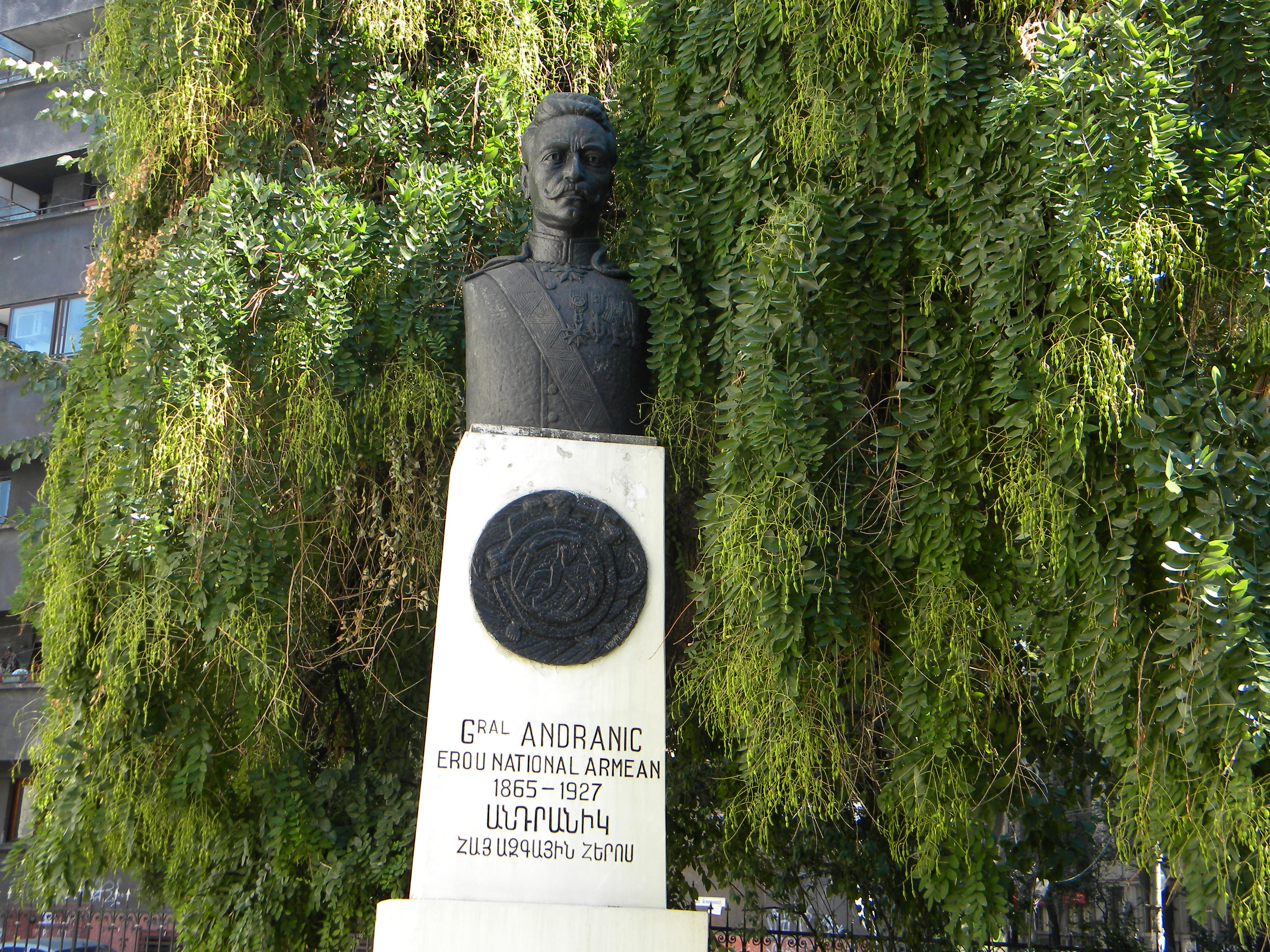
Andranik statue
