= Dimitrie Maimarolu =

Romanian architect

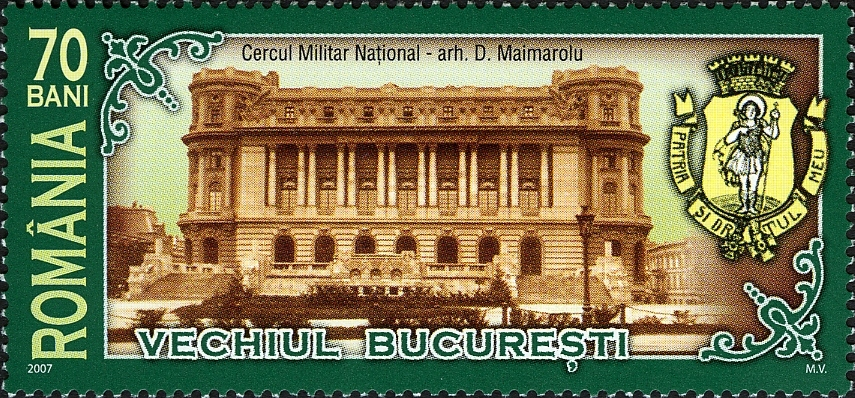
Poșta Română stamp from 2007 depicting the Palace of the National Military Circle, designed by architect Dimitrie Maimarolu

Dimitrie Maimarolu (1859 in Bucharest – 1926) was a Romanian architect, whose designs featured French Beaux-Arts style.

He came from an Aromanian family, with roots in Macedonia. He studied architecture in France, first with Julien Guadet and from 1881 at the École des Beaux-Arts in Paris. After graduating in 1885, he returned to Romania and is named architect for the Interior Ministry. Promoted to architect-in-chief in 1887, he held the position until 1892. By 1898 he was working for the Agriculture Ministry, developing the Bibescu Garden in Craiova.

Among the buildings he designed are:

- Argeș County Prefecture Building (built in 1899, in 1970 it became the County Museum of History and Natural Science).
- Gorj County Prefecture, in Târgu Jiu (finishing touches, 1902).
- Church of St. Sylvester, Bucharest (reconstruction and enlargement, from 1904 to 1907).
- St. Haralambos Church of Turnu Măgurele (1905)
- Palace of the Chamber of Deputies (the Patriarchal Palace today), completed in 1907
- Palace of the National Military Circle, begun in 1911, completed in 1923.
- Armenian Church in Bucharest, 1911–1912, with Grigore Cerchez
- Hotel Concordia.
- Vorvorenilor's Home (Palace) in Craiova (present residence of the Metropolitan of Oltenia)

== Legacy ==
On 1 March 2005, a bust of Maimarolu was unveiled within the National Military Circle Palace.
