= Armenian Church (disambiguation) =

Armenian Church is a multi-denominational concept. Thus it may refer to Armenian Apostolic, Armenian Catholic or Armenian Evangelical (Protestant) churches. It can also refer to individual Christian Armenian religious buildings in various locations.

== Institutions ==
- Armenian Apostolic Church, founded in 1st century AD, adopted as state religion in 301
  - Mother See of Holy Etchmiadzin
    - Armenian Patriarchate of Jerusalem
    - Armenian Patriarchate of Constantinople
  - Holy See of Cilicia (official name: Armenian Catholicosate of the Great House of Cilicia)
- Armenian Catholic Church, founded in 1742
- Armenian Evangelical Church, founded in 1846

== Armenian church buildings ==
- Armenian Church, Brăila, Romania
- Armenian Church, Bucharest, Romania
- Armenian Church, Chennai, India
- Armenian Church (Dhaka), Dhaka, Bangladesh
- Armenian Church, Focșani, Romania
- Armenian Church, Iași, Romania
- Armenian Church, Pitești, Romania
- Armenian Church, Singapore
- Armenian Church of the Holy Nazareth, Calcutta, India
