= St. Mary Armenian Church =

St. Mary Armenian Church may refer to:

- Armenian Church, Brăila, Romania
- St. Mary Armenian Church, Saidabad, India
- St. Mary Armenian Apostolic Church, Toronto, Canada
- St. Mary Church of New Julfa, Isfahan, Iran
