= Constance Pascal =

French psychiatrist

- Born: 24 August 1877; Pitești, Wallachia, Romania
- Died: 21 December 1937 (aged 60); Neuilly-sur-Marne, France
- Occupations: psychiatrist, author

Constance Pascal (August 24, 1877 – December 21, 1937) was a Romanian-born psychiatrist who practised in France and became the first woman psychiatrist and the first women head doctor of a psychiatric hospital in France. Best known for her work on dementia praecox, she researched the social as well as the biological causes of mental illness. Pascal founded one of the first ‘medical-pedagogic’ institutes in France. Her monograph, Chagrins d'amour et psychoses (1935), reflected her wide cultural interests.

== Early life and education ==
Constance Pascal was born on 24 August 1877 in Pitești, a small town near Bucharest. She began her schooling in Romania, then came to France for her medical training. Pascal gained a degree in medicine from the University of Paris, one of the few universities that, at the end of the 19th century, admitted female students, including foreigners. Her thesis entitled Formes atypiques de la paralysie générale: prédominance régionales des lésions dans les méningoencéphalites diffuses (The atypical forms of general paralysis) was published in 1905 and celebrated as "both a feminine and a feminist success."

In 1903, Pascal benefited from the press campaign that her colleague Madeleine Pelletier had conducted with the support of the feminist newspaper La Fronde to support the eligibility of women for all types of medical specialisation, most relevantly to the examination for psychiatric internships.

== Psychiatric career ==
When Jean-Martin Charcot (1825–1893) took over the Pitié-Salpêtrière Hospital in Paris, the hospital became celebrated as a neuropsychiatric teaching centre, represented on canvas in 1887 by A Clinical Lesson at the Salpêtrière by André Brouillet. By the early twentieth century when Pascal entered psychiatric medicine, French medical doctors who wanted to specialise in neurology or psychiatry were required to do an internship at the Pitié-Salpêtrière Hospital. At this time, Salpêtrière was not on the list of Paris hospitals because it was considered a university and clinic rather than a real psychiatric hospital.

After completing her internship at Salpêtrière, Pascal became a psychiatrist alienist in Charenton-le-Pont as doctor-in-chief, then doctor-chef in Prémontré in 1920 and in Châlons-sur-Marne in 1922. In 1925, she was assigned to the post of physician director of the Roger-Prévot Hospital Center in Moisselles where with Jean Davesne where she wrote Treatment of mental illnesses by shocks. In 1927, Pascal became chief physician in Maison Blanche near Paris. In 1935, Pascal published Chagrins d'amour et psychoses, a book centred on the psychoses caused by affective traumas. Pascal remained at Maison Blanche until her death after a long illness in 1937.

== Personal life ==
During the First World War, following a relationship with General Justin Mangin, she gave birth to Jeanne in 1916. The names of the parents are not specified in the birth certificate and Jeanne was registered as a daughter of unknown father and mother. In 1924, Pascal adopted Jeanne, who was not told the truth about her birth until adulthood.

Constance Pascal died at Neuilly-sur-Marne on 21 December 1937 of breast cancer after a long illness.

== Bibliography ==
- Les formes atypiques de la paralysie générale (Prix de thèse, médaille de bronze), 1905.
- La démence précoce; étude psychologique médicale et médico-légale, Paris, Alcan, 1911.
- Jean Davesne, Traitement des maladies mentales par les chocs, Paris, Masson, 1926.
- Chagrins d'amour et psychoses, Paris, G. Doin, 1935.
- Chagrins d'amour et psychoses, Paris, Éditions L'Harmattan, 2000.
