= University of Pitești =

University in Pitești, Romania

Coordinates: 44°52′11″N 24°51′37″E

The University of Pitești
- Universitatea din Pitești
- Motto: Latin: Academia Magistra Vitae
- Type: Public
- Established: 1991
- Rector: Associate Professor, Ph.D. Dumitru Chirleșan
- Academic staff: 388 (2018)
- Administrative staff: 133 (2018)
- Students: 9,087 (2017–2018)
- Doctoral students: 109 (2017–2018)
- Location: Piteşti, Argeș, Romania

The University of Piteşti (Romanian: Universitatea din Pitești, abbreviated UPIT) is a public university in Piteşti, Romania, founded in 1991.

== History ==
The first higher education institution in Piteşti was founded in 1962 and was called the Three-year Pedagogical Institute with pedagogical specialisations in mathematics, physics, biology, chemistry, philology and physical education and sports. The opening of the technical specialisations followed, leading to the establishment of the Institute of Sub-Engineers (1969), united in 1974 under the name of the Institute of Higher Education. Subsequently, there were various other forms of organisation, in a period under the subordination of the Bucharest Polytechnic Institute. In 1991, it became autonomous and received the name University of Pitești.

== Faculties ==
The University of Pitești is organised into 6 faculties, comprising 16 departments:

- Faculty of Sciences, Physical Education and Computer Science
- Faculty of Mechanics and Technology
- Faculty of Electronics, Communications and Computers
- Faculty of Education, Social Sciences and Psychology
- Faculty of Economics and Law
- Faculty of Theology, Philology, History and Arts
