= Pitești =

- Municipality
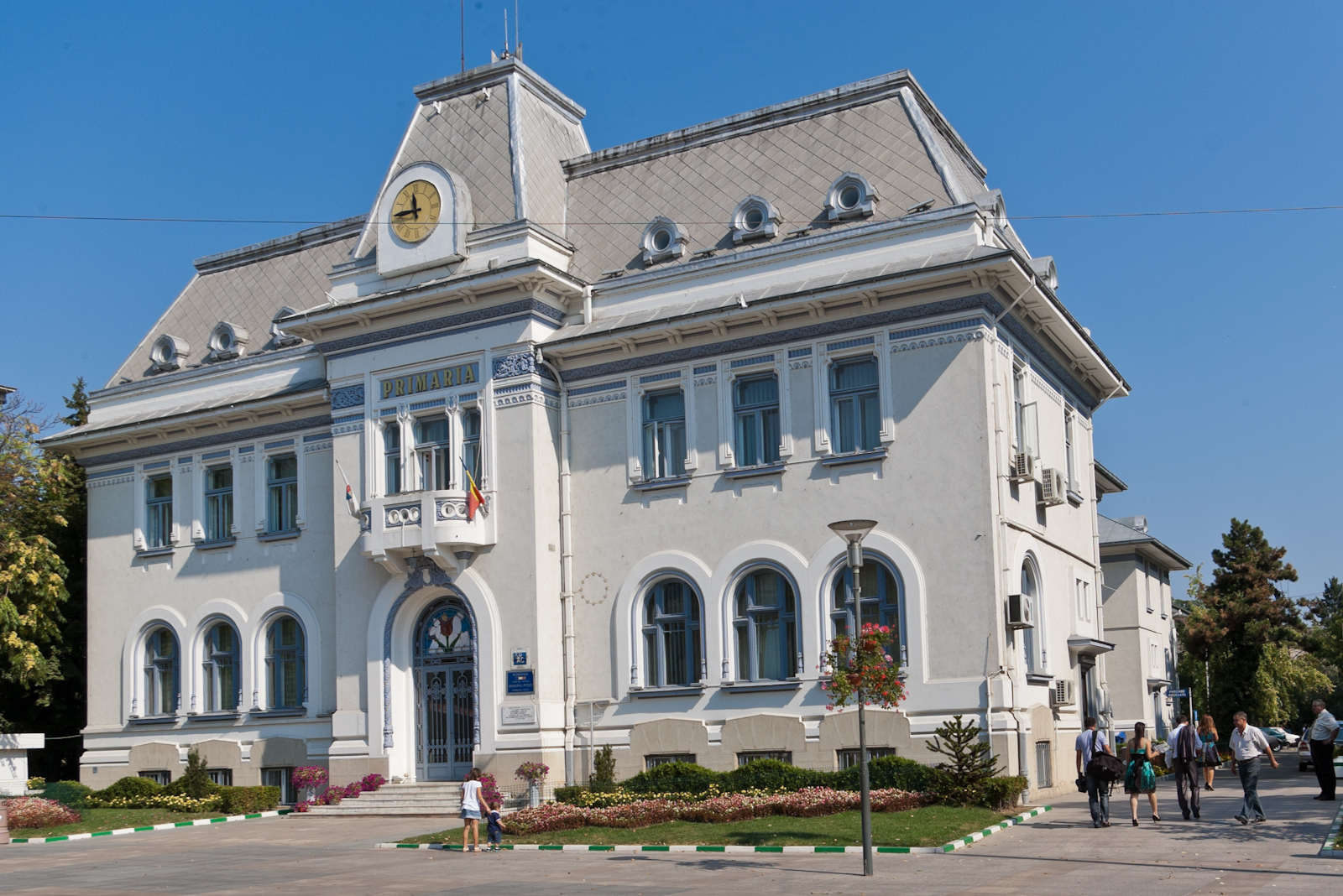
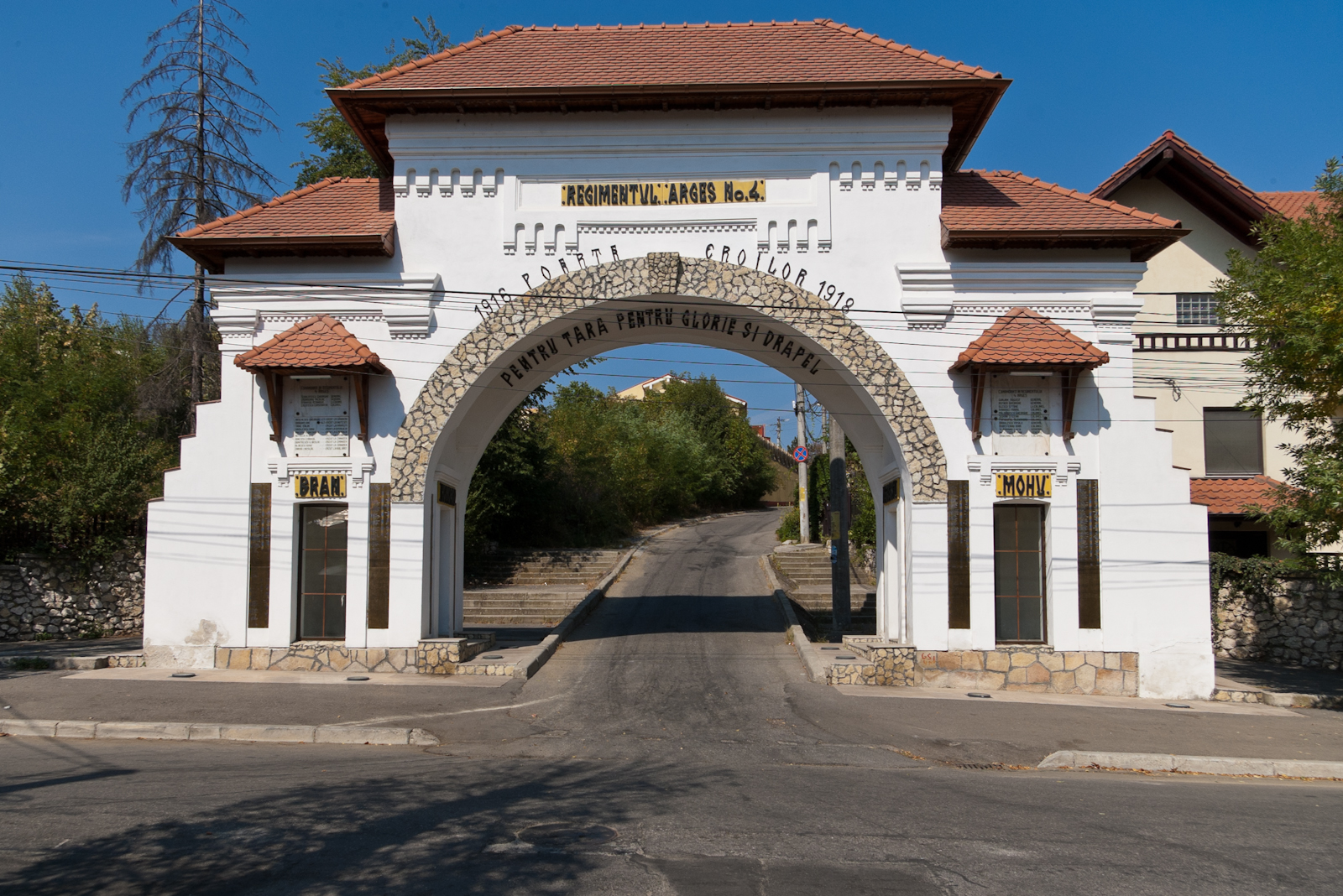
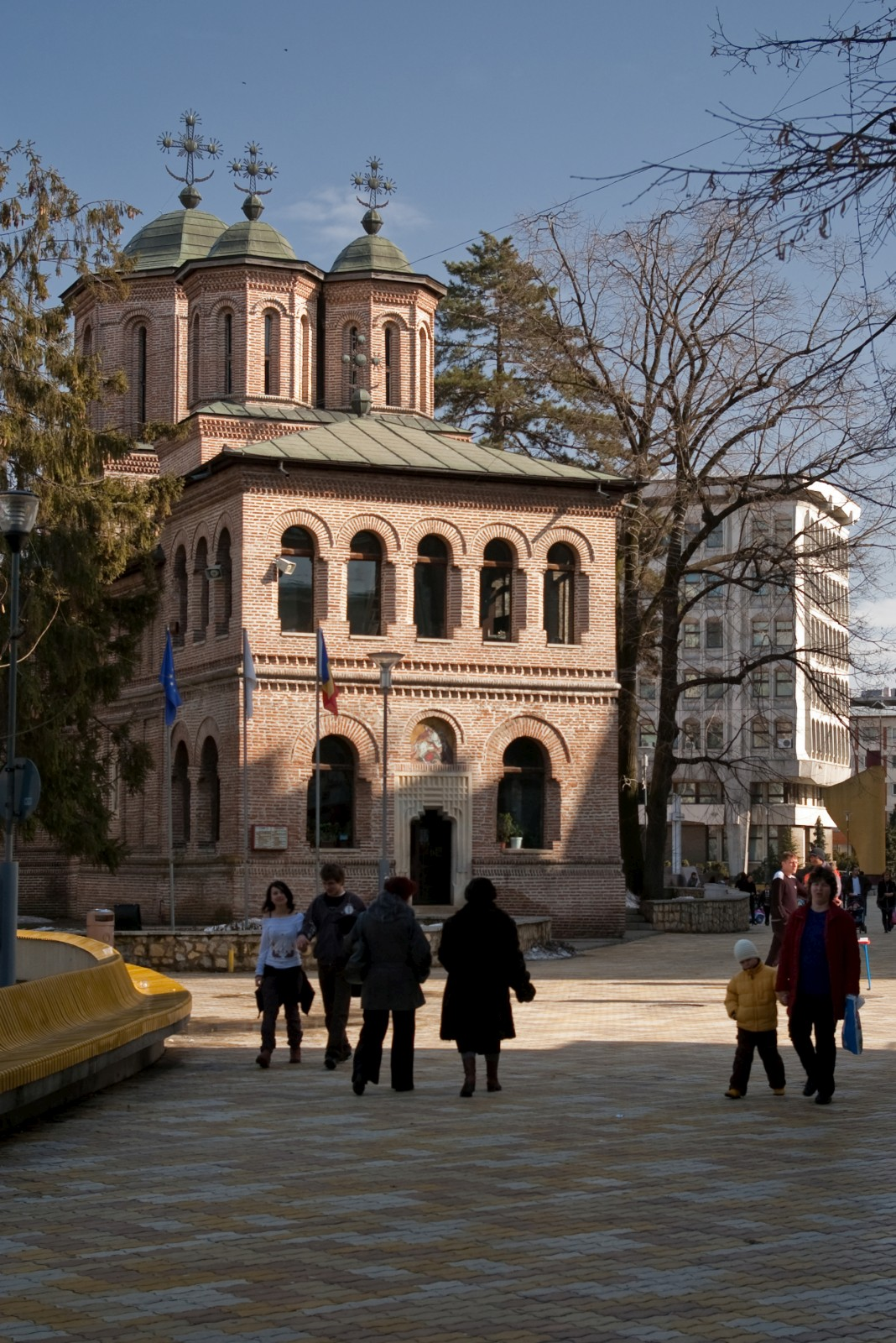
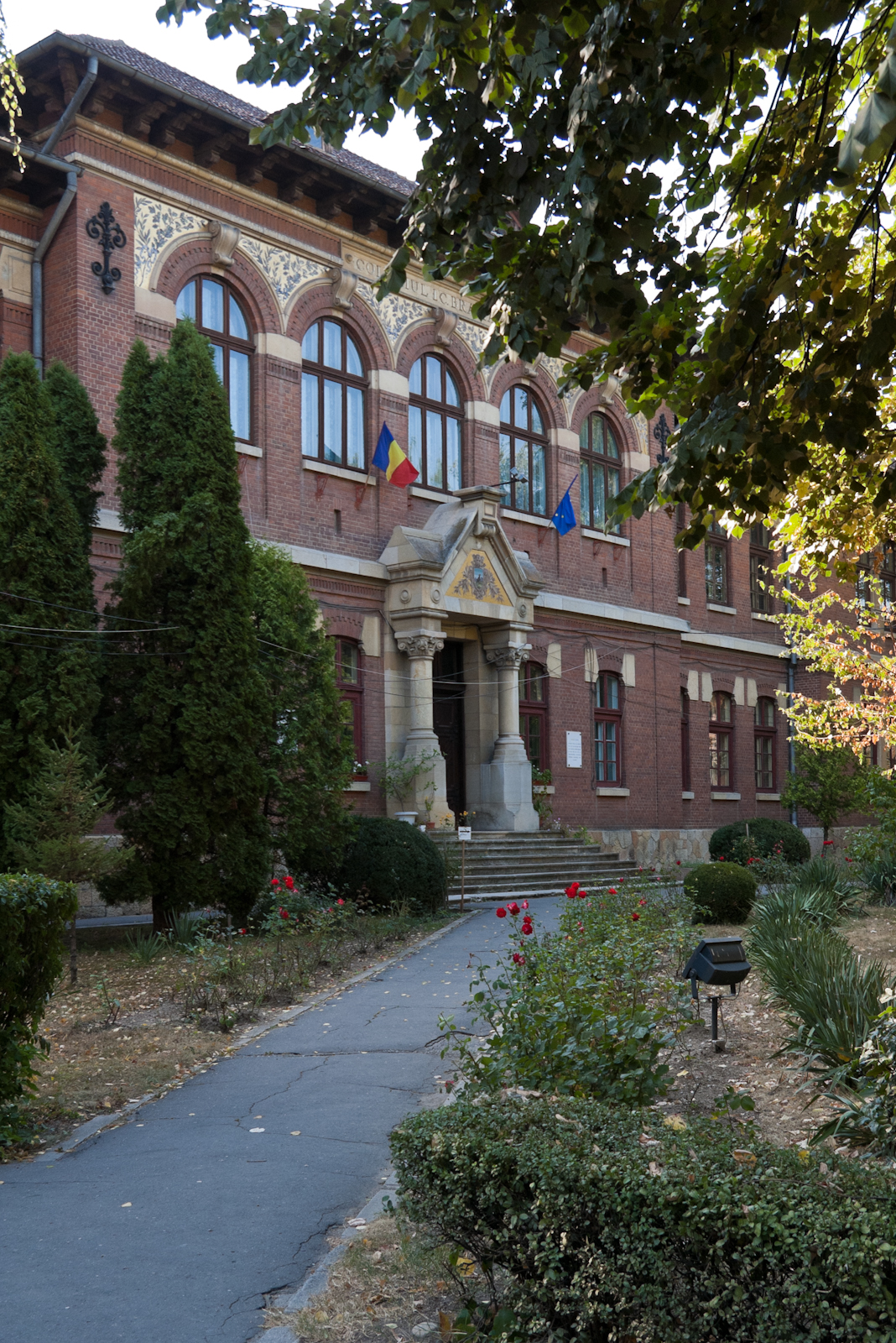
- From top, left to right: Town Hall, St. George Church, I.C. Brătianu High School, Heroes' Gate

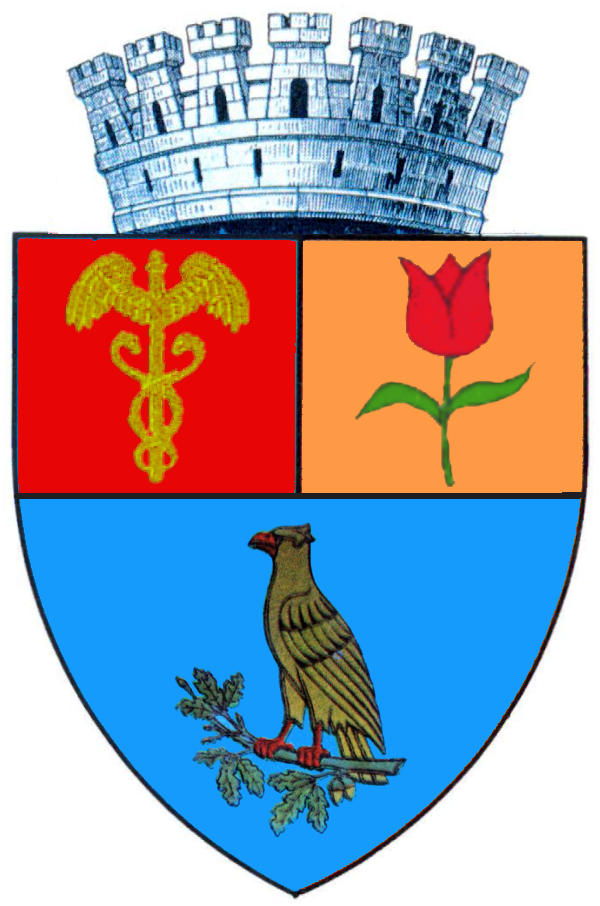
- Coat of arms

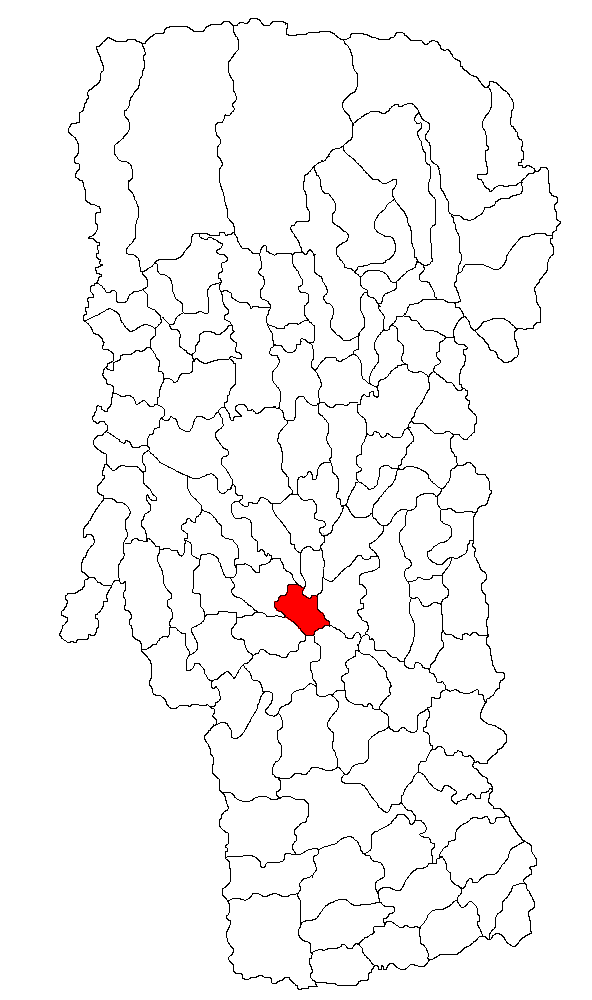
- Location in Argeș County

- Location in Romania
- Coordinates: 44°51′38″N 24°52′4″E
- Country: Romania
- County: Argeș

Government
  - Mayor (2024–2028): Cristian Gentea (PSD)
- Area: 40.7 km^{2} (15.7 sq mi)
- Population (2021-12-01): 141,275
  - Density: 3,470/km^{2} (8,990/sq mi)
- Time zone: UTC+02:00 (EET)
  - Summer (DST): UTC+03:00 (EEST)
- Vehicle reg.: AG
- Website: primariapitesti.ro

Pitești (Romanian pronunciation: [piˈteʃtʲ]) is a city in Romania, located on the river Argeș. The capital and largest city of Argeș County, it is an important commercial and industrial center, as well as the home of two universities. Pitești is situated in the historical region of Muntenia. It lies on the A1 freeway, connecting the city directly to the national capital Bucharest, being an important railway junction, with a classification yard in nearby Bălilești. The city houses the Arpechim oil refinery, and is a marketing center for the automotive industry, in particular, Automobile Dacia.

Inhabited since prehistoric times but first mentioned in the 14th century, it developed as a trading town in northern Wallachia, serving as an informal residence for various Wallachian princes until the 18th century. From the 19th century and until the interwar period, it was an important political center for the National Liberal Party and the main residence of the Brătianu family of politicians. During the early stages of the communist regime, it was one of the main sites of political repression, with the Pitești Prison becoming home to an experiment in brainwashing techniques.

== History ==
=== Early history ===
The earliest traces of human settlements in this area relate to the Paleolithic. Coins minted by the Dacians during the 3rd century BC, copying the design of Thracian tetradrachmon issued by Lysimachus, have been discovered here. A small Roman castrum was built sometime in the 3rd century AD in the vicinity of present-day Pitești (part of a protection system for Roman Dacia and Moesia). During the Age of Migrations, the Pitești area was, according to historian Constantin C. Giurescu, the site of trading between Vlachs and Slavs, which, in his opinion, was the origin of Târgul din Deal ("The Market on the Hill"), a separate locality.

The first recorded mention of Pitești itself was on May 20, 1386, when Wallachian Prince Mircea I granted a gristmill in the area to Cozia Monastery. Pitești was subsequently one of the temporary residences of Wallachian princes. Due to its positioning on the junction of major European routes (and its proximity to the Saxon markets in Hermannstadt, Transylvania), the city originally developed as an important commercial center. By the late 14th century, it became home to a sizable Armenian community.

At the time, the locality only extended on the left bank of the Argeș, and gradually expanded over the river, reaching the hill slopes to the west (in the 19th century, it completely absorbed Târgul din Deal). While Pitești was commonly designated as a high-ranking town, a village of Pitești was still mentioned as late as 1528, which led some historians to conclude that the village and urban area coexisted within the same boundaries.

=== Early Modern period ===
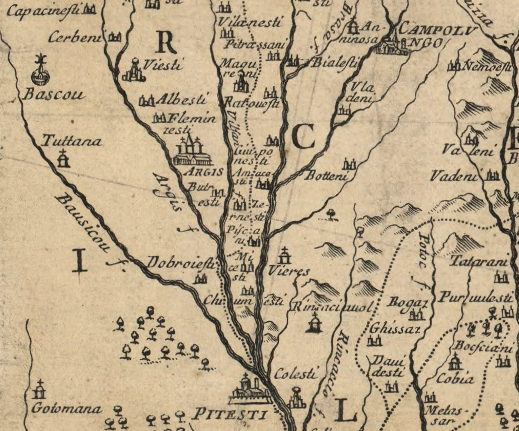
Pitești, Câmpulung and Curtea de Argeș on the Constantin Cantacuzino map of 1718

Although princely quarters have not been uncovered, among the rulers to issue documents from Pitești were Basarab Țepeluș cel Tânăr (1477–1481), Neagoe Basarab (1512–1521), Vlad Înecatul (1530–1532), Vlad Vintilă de la Slatina (1532–1535), Michael the Brave (1593–1601), Simion Movilă (1601–1602), Matei Basarab (1632–1654) and Constantin Șerban (1654–1658). In addition, Constantin Brâncoveanu (1688–1714), who owned large sections of vineyard in the area, is reported to have spent several seasons in the town.

Under Vlad Vintilă, who allied himself with the Holy Roman Empire against his Ottoman overlords, Aloisio Gritti (governor of Ottoman Hungary) and his Wallachian boyar partisans camped in the Pitești neighborhood of Războieni, where they were attacked and defeated by the prince. In 1600–1601, troops of the Polish–Lithuanian Commonwealth, led by Jan Zamoyski, were stationed in Pitești during their expedition against Michael the Brave (see Moldavian Magnate Wars). Around that time, fighting occurred in and around the town as the new prince Radu Șerban clashed with the Ottomans and their Crimean Khanate allies.

Constantin Șerban financed the building of the Orthodox Saint George Church, completed in 1656. His building program also included a (since-lost) palace and adjacent gardens. Around that time, the city hosted travelers of renown, such as Arab chronicler Paul of Aleppo and Swedish politician Claes Rålamb. It was during Brâncoveanu's rule that the city was home to Stolnic Constantin Cantacuzino, who was exchanging letters with English statesman William, Baron Paget. A tower and other princely houses, built by Brâncoveanu outside the town, gradually deteriorated over the 18th and 19th centuries (the last standing structure was lost in the 20th century). In 1689, Habsburg troops led by Louis William of Baden occupied the city as part of the Great Turkish War (they were repelled later that year).

=== 18th and early 19th centuries ===
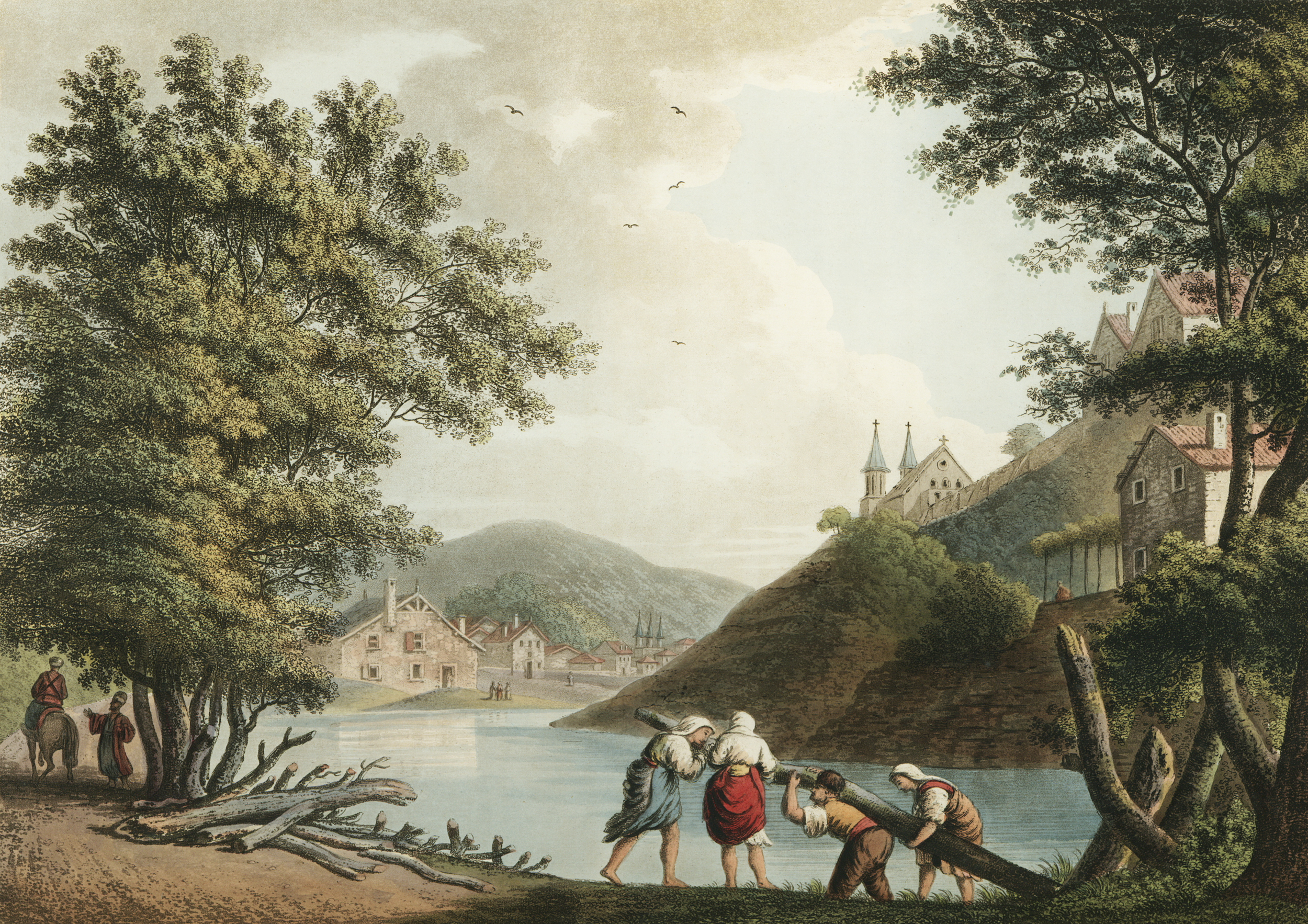
Pitești in 1793, etching by Luigi Mayer

In November 1714, as a direct result of Swedish defeats in the Great Northern War against Imperial Russia, Swedish King Charles XII unsuccessfully sought an alliance with Sultan Ahmed III; on his way back from Istanbul, Charles and Axel Sparre passed through Pitești, and, after a three-week stay, made their way to Swedish Pomerania through Habsburg-ruled regions. During the Austro-Turkish War of 1716–1718, Habsburg troops attacked and captured the town; Pitești was again the scene of battles during the Austro-Turkish War of 1737–1739.

In 1780, Tuscan numismatist Domenico Sestini passed through the Argeș region, and described the town as having 250 houses and 7 churches. In 1804, the citizens requested to have an upper school opened (to offer lectures in Greek, the educational language of the time); their request was denied by Prince Constantine Ypsilantis. During the 1790s, Pitești was visited by Luigi Mayer, a German pupil of Giovanni Battista Piranesi, who left etchings of the region (including the very first one of Pitești); they were published in London in 1810, with text by a T. Bowyer, whose caption for Pitești read "nothing more wild or romantic can be conceived".

The town was an important location for events relating to the last stage of the Wallachian uprising of 1821 and the first stages of the Greek War of Independence: it was here that, in late spring 1821, the Wallachian rebel leader Tudor Vladimirescu settled after retreating from Bucharest. His departure raised suspicion from his Eterist allies that he was planning to abandon the common cause. Vladimirescu was captured in the nearby locality of Băilești and executed soon after, on orders from Alexander Ypsilantis.

=== Late 19th and early 20th century ===
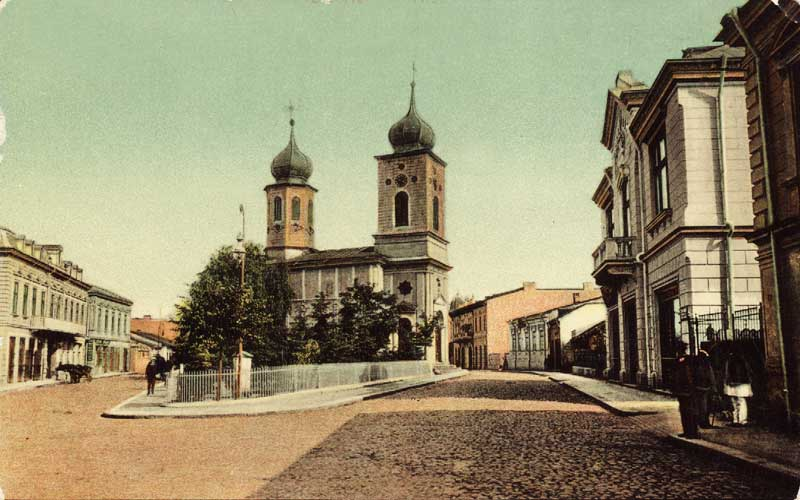
Postcard of Saint Nicholas Church, early 20th century

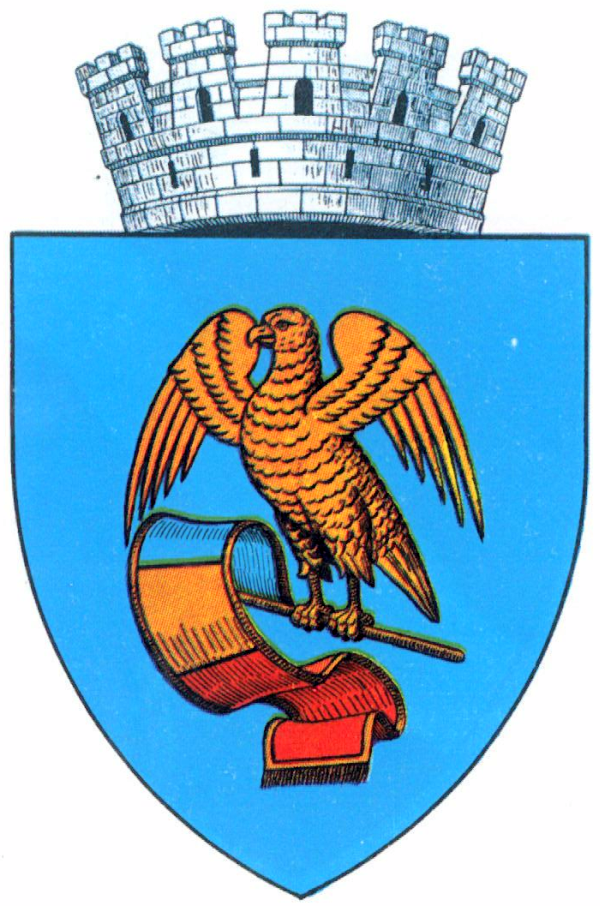
Coat of arms of Pitești during the interwar period

The city was developed further after the 1859 unification of the Danubian Principalities and the 1881 creation of the Romanian Kingdom. Around that time, and down to the late interwar, the city became a National Liberal center, largely due to the Brătianu family of politicians residing in nearby Ștefănești. Their manor, Florica, housed most major reunions of the National Liberal leaders. For a short period in 1882, Pitești was home to dramatist Ion Luca Caragiale, leading some to propose that it was the unnamed National Liberal-dominated city depicted in Caragiale's famous play O scrisoare pierdută.

By 1872, a national railway connection with the capital Bucharest and Târgoviște was built, at the same time as one linking Bucharest with Ploiești through Chitila. Overseen by the German financier Bethel Henry Strousberg, this was the second project of its kind in Romania (after the Bucharest-Giurgiu rail link of 1869). The Pitești Town Hall was completed in 1886, and currently houses an art gallery. The Argeș County Prefecture, designed by Dimitrie Maimarolu, was erected in 1898–1899 on the site previously occupied by an Orthodox hermitage; it is the present-day site of the County Museum of History and Natural Sciences. Both buildings are eclectic in style, and feature frescoes painted by Iosif Materna.

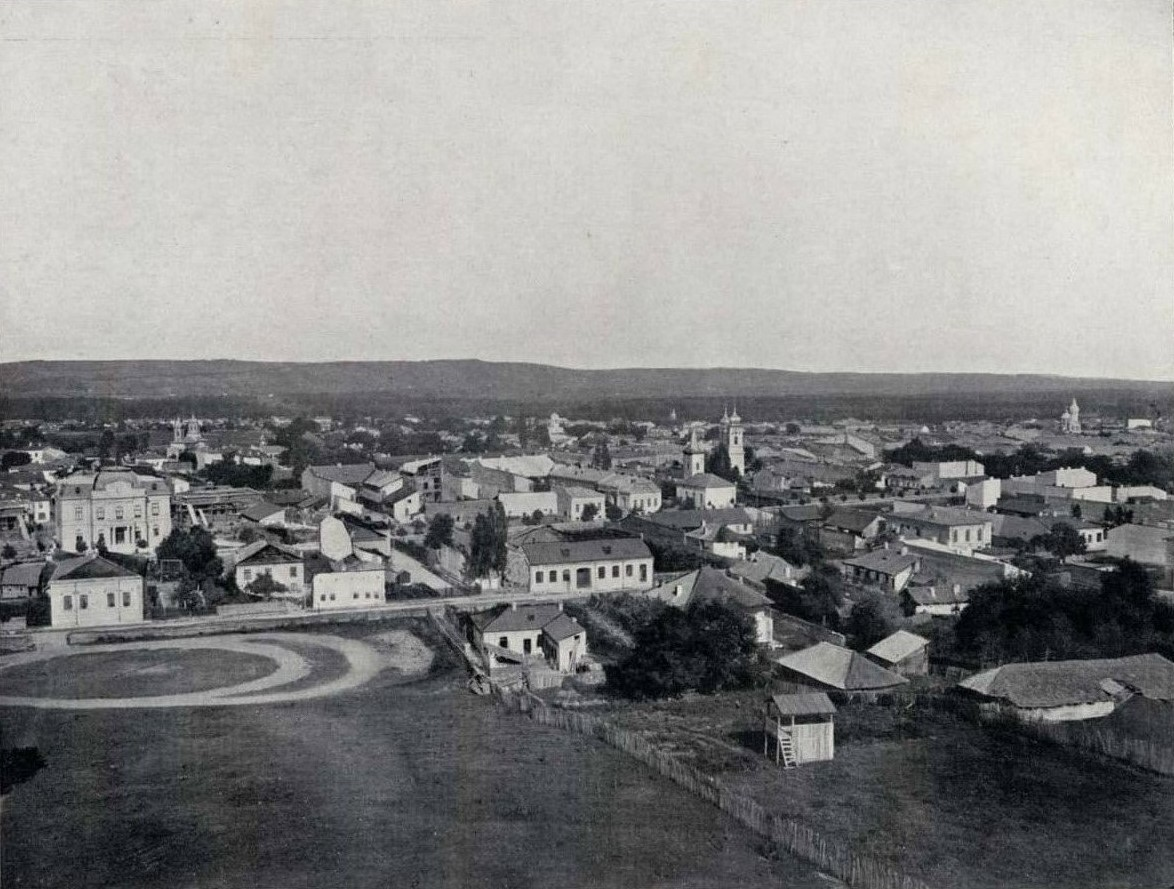
Photo of Pitești c. 1893

Pitești experienced urbanization and economic development with several changes in landscape and a number of regional firsts. In 1868–1869, Pitești was the first city in Romania to have a recorded Seventh-day Adventist community, formed around Michał Belina-Czechowski, a Polish preacher and former Catholic priest who had returned from the United States (the Seventh-day Adventist Church in Romania was established only after 1918). By 1906, Pitești was home to a thriving cooperative bank, Banca Populară Pitești, which was also the first-ever financial institution in the Argeș County. In 1907, factory manager Edmond Landauer performed the very first Tayloristic experiments in Romania, at Pitești Weaving Mill.

From late autumn 1916 to 1918, during the World War I battles, Pitești was occupied by the troops of the Central Powers. The city was originally abandoned by the Romanian Army and taken by the German commander August von Mackensen as the front stabilized on the Olt River, before Mackensen was able to occupy Bucharest and the entire southern Romania. During the post-war existence of Greater Romania, Pitești became a regional cultural center, notably hosting the 1928–1929 series of the magazine Kalende (published in cooperation by literary critics Vladimir Streinu, Șerban Cioculescu, Pompiliu Constantinescu, and Tudor Șoimaru).

=== World War II and communism ===
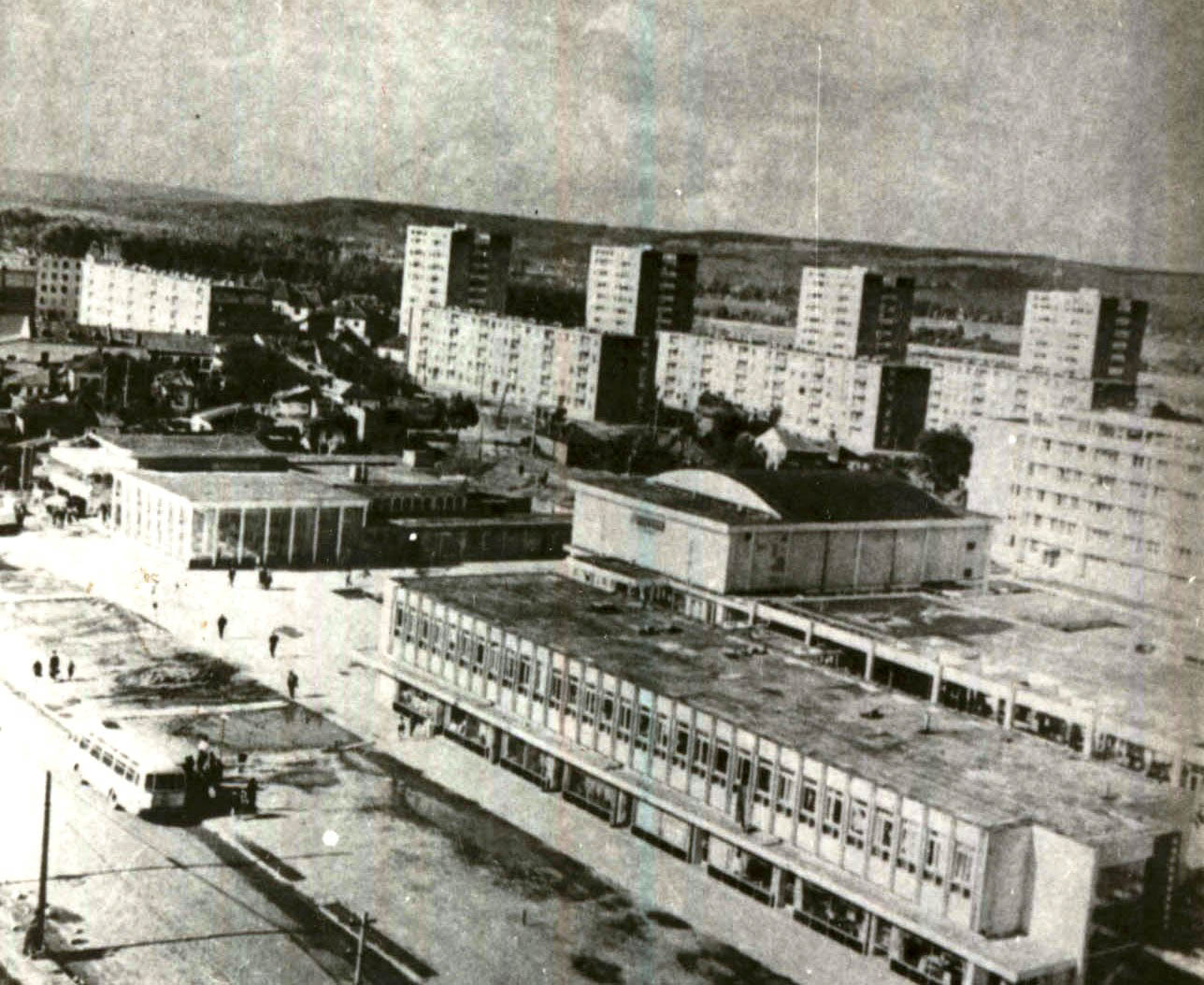
Tower blocks in Pitești, photographed in 1970, shortly after their completion

Pitești was affected in various ways by World War II and its successive regimes. After a fascist National Legionary State was proclaimed by the Iron Guard in late 1940, a bronze bust of former premier Armand Călinescu (whom the Guard had assassinated in September 1939), was chained and dragged through the city streets. In December 1943, under the dictatorship of Conducător Ion Antonescu (a Pitești native), it saw the final chapter in a chain of deportations of Romani people to Transnistria (see Holocaust in Romania). The city was sporadically bombed by the Allies: on July 4, 1944, it was struck by a section of the US Fifteenth Air Force (see Bombing of Romania in World War II).

In the 1950s, while serving as capital of Regiunea Argeș, Pitești gained an ill notoriety, when the communist authorities used the local detention facility to subject political detainees to "reeducation", in which violence between inmates was encouraged to the point of being mandatory (see Pitești prison). The experiment was carried out by the Securitate secret police and overseen by Alexandru Nicolschi; its goal was to psychologically destroy the capacity for outside attachment and outside loyalty, creating the brainwashed New Man prototype of Leninism. The program was canceled after some five years. At a trial held in 1953–1954, twenty-two inmate-participants were sentenced, with sixteen being condemned to death for their role in the experiment. In 1957, a new trial convicted certain members of the prison staff, who received light sentences; they were later pardoned.

In parallel, Pitești underwent numerous changes in landscape, including the completion of the A1 freeway, the first road of its kind, during the 1960s, and the acceleration of industrialization with a focus on the chemical and automotive industries. Around 1950, Pitești area accommodated ELAS refugees from the Greek Civil War (some of the buildings erected for this purpose were later used to house resettled peasants). Florica was nationalized in 1948, and was later partly devastated by Romanian Communist Party activists (for a while during the 1970s, it was a residence of the communist politician Ion Dincă). The bust of Ion Brătianu, standing in front of Saint Nicholas Church, was removed and melted, and the church itself was demolished in 1962.

== Geography ==
The city is part of the historical region of Wallachia, situated in its north and in the westernmost part of its Muntenian subregion. It lies on the right bank of the Argeș, where the river meets its tributary, Râul Doamnei.

Pitești is situated 280 metres (918.64 feet) above sea level, on terraces formed by the Argeș, and belongs to the southernmost section of the Getic Plateau (an area of foothills leading up to the Southern Carpathians). The Plateau is at its narrowest in the Pitești area, where it only reaches 30 km (19 miles) in width, as opposed to the 70–80 km (43–50 miles) average. The city has access to a piedmont plain, known as Câmpia Piteștilor ("Pitești Plain") and characterized by water-meadows. To the west, it abuts the Trivale Forest, which has been partly set up as a leisure park.

Pitești is adjacent to two reservoirs on the Argeș, in its Prundu area and in nearby Bascov (the Budeasa Dam). It is situated downstream from Lake Vidraru and upstream from the reservoir in Bălilești.

=== Climate ===
According to the Köppen climate classification, the city lies within the humid subtropical climate (Cfa) category. The average annual temperature is 12.6 °C. The average January temperature is 1.6 °C, while the average July temperature is 23.6 °C.

Climate data for Pitești (altitude 316m, 2014–2026 normals, extremes 1980–present)
Month	Jan	Feb	Mar	Apr	May	Jun	Jul	Aug	Sep	Oct	Nov	Dec	Year
Record high °C (°F)	20.2 (68.4)	22.4 (72.3)	27.2 (81.0)	30.5 (86.9)	34.0 (93.2)	40.5 (104.9)	39.9 (103.8)	39.1 (102.4)	36.0 (96.8)	30.8 (87.4)	26.8 (80.2)	20.6 (69.1)	40.5 (104.9)
Mean daily maximum °C (°F)	5.9 (42.6)	8.4 (47.1)	12.5 (54.5)	17.9 (64.2)	22.3 (72.1)	27.9 (82.2)	30.3 (86.5)	30.6 (87.1)	25.2 (77.4)	18.1 (64.6)	11.2 (52.2)	7.4 (45.3)	18.1 (64.6)
Daily mean °C (°F)	1.6 (34.9)	3.8 (38.8)	7.3 (45.1)	11.9 (53.4)	16.4 (61.5)	21.5 (70.7)	23.6 (74.5)	23.6 (74.5)	18.7 (65.7)	12.5 (54.5)	7.3 (45.1)	3.5 (38.3)	12.6 (54.8)
Mean daily minimum °C (°F)	−2.7 (27.1)	−0.9 (30.4)	2.2 (36.0)	5.9 (42.6)	10.5 (50.9)	15.2 (59.4)	16.8 (62.2)	16.6 (61.9)	12.3 (54.1)	7.0 (44.6)	3.4 (38.1)	−0.3 (31.5)	7.2 (44.9)
Record low °C (°F)	−27.0 (−16.6)	−16.1 (3.0)	−16.8 (1.8)	−3.3 (26.1)	0.9 (33.6)	5.6 (42.1)	7.0 (44.6)	2.0 (35.6)	0.5 (32.9)	−4.7 (23.5)	−11.8 (10.8)	−17.0 (1.4)	−27.0 (−16.6)
Average precipitation mm (inches)	47.3 (1.86)	29.8 (1.17)	56.0 (2.20)	48.6 (1.91)	95.7 (3.77)	87.6 (3.45)	65.9 (2.59)	42.5 (1.67)	64.6 (2.54)	52.0 (2.05)	62.8 (2.47)	52.5 (2.07)	705.3 (27.75)
Average precipitation days (≥ 1.0 mm)	7.3	5.9	7.1	7.0	10.7	8.7	6.6	4.2	4.9	5.2	7.8	6.3	81.7
Average snowy days	7.4	5.5	3.6	0.6	0	0	0	0	0	0	2.2	4.2	23.5
Source: Meteomanz (2014-2026); Infoclimat (1981-2010)

== Demographics ==
Historical population
Year	Pop.	±%
1835	2,755	—
1859	7,229	+162.4%
1899	15,669	+116.8%
1930	19,532	+24.7%
1941	26,551	+35.9%
1948	29,007	+9.3%
1956	38,330	+32.1%
1966	60,113	+56.8%
1977	123,735	+105.8%
1992	179,337	+44.9%
2002	168,458	−6.1%
2011	155,383	−7.8%
2021	141,275	−9.1%

As of 2021 census data, 141,275 inhabitants live within the city limits, a decrease from the figure recorded at the 2011 census.

Romania's 2011 census recorded a population of 155,383 for the city. Of the individuals for whom data were available, 99.1% were ethnic Romanians and 0.6% Roma. In terms of religion, 98.4% were Romanian Orthodox; 0.3% Roman Catholic; and 0.2% each Pentecostal, Christian Evangelical, Baptist and Evangelical. A further 0.2% were atheist or non-religious. A 2016 estimate placed the population at 177,485. The 1930 census found that 88.0% of residents were Romanians, 3.0% Jews, 2.5% Hungarians, 2.2% Roma, 1.4% Germans, 0.6% Greeks and 0.3% each Russians, Bulgarians, Armenians and, grouped together, Serbs, Croats and Slovenes.

The population of Pitești grew between the 1830s and the 1990s, with the most sustained period of growth occurring after the 1950s, when industrial development created jobs and attracted residents from nearby settlements. The population peaked at an estimated 187,000 in 1997, then stagnated until 2001, and has gradually decreased since that time. The drop is particularly noticeable among the male population: this segment not only has a higher mortality and lower life expectancy, but also, due to de-industrialization, emigrated in search of work in significant numbers.

== Economy ==
Pitești is one of the most industrialized cities in Romania. It is the center of the automotive industry in the country: the Automobile Dacia automaker is situated in the nearby town of Mioveni, and several other automobile parts manufacturers are located within its urban area (Dräxlmaier Group, Lear Corporation and Valeo). The city also houses the Arpechim oil refinery, part of the Petrom group. The plant, established as a state-owned company during communism, has traditionally been the center of controversy over its air pollution records. In 2007, the Ministry of the Environment withdrew Arpechim's permit, but Petrom contested the decision in court. The plant is scheduled to gradually reduce its activity over a period of several years, pending eventual closure.

The city is surrounded by hills rich in wineries and plum orchards. The latter give one of the finest Romanian țuicas: țuica de Pitești. The Ștefănești winery, situated on the opposite bank of the Argeș River, is one of the best known in Romania.

== Culture ==
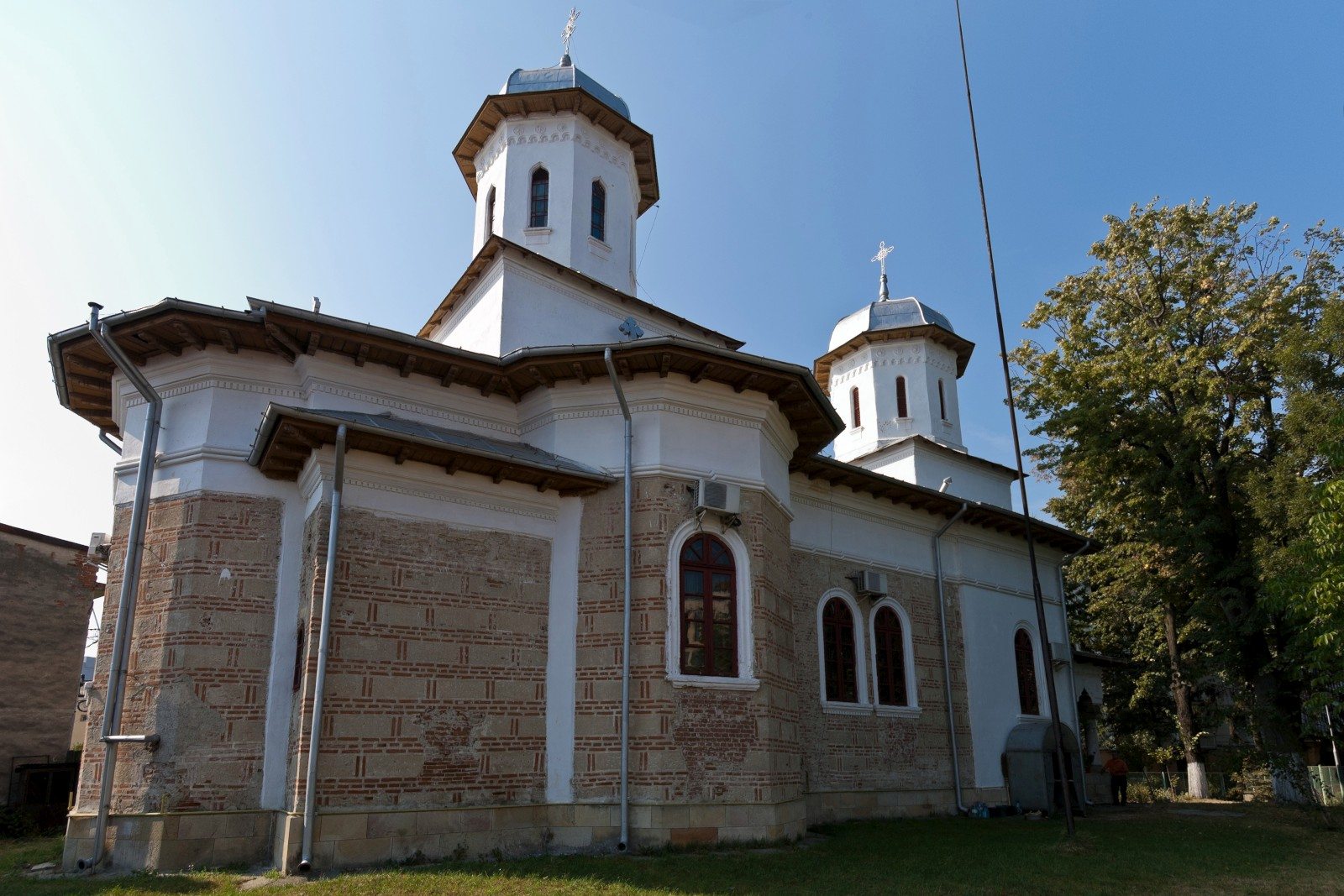
Greci Church

=== Theatre ===
Pitești is home to a County Theater; established in 1948, it was named in honor of playwright Alexandru Davila a decade later. Its branches include a puppet theater (created in 1949), the Estrada section for open-air performances (1958), and a folklore section (1970). The Theater's Studio 125 was established in May 1975 by director Liviu Ciulei.

The first written record of a theatrical performance in the city dates to 1848, when Constantin Halepliu set up a troupe. Following that year's revolution, several actors, Halepliu included, were arrested, and the theatre closed until 1856. A Communal Theatre was built in 1914–1916. Since 1948, the local acting ensemble has performed both in other Romanian cities and abroad, including in Poland, Serbia, Bulgaria, Italy and Spain.

=== Education ===
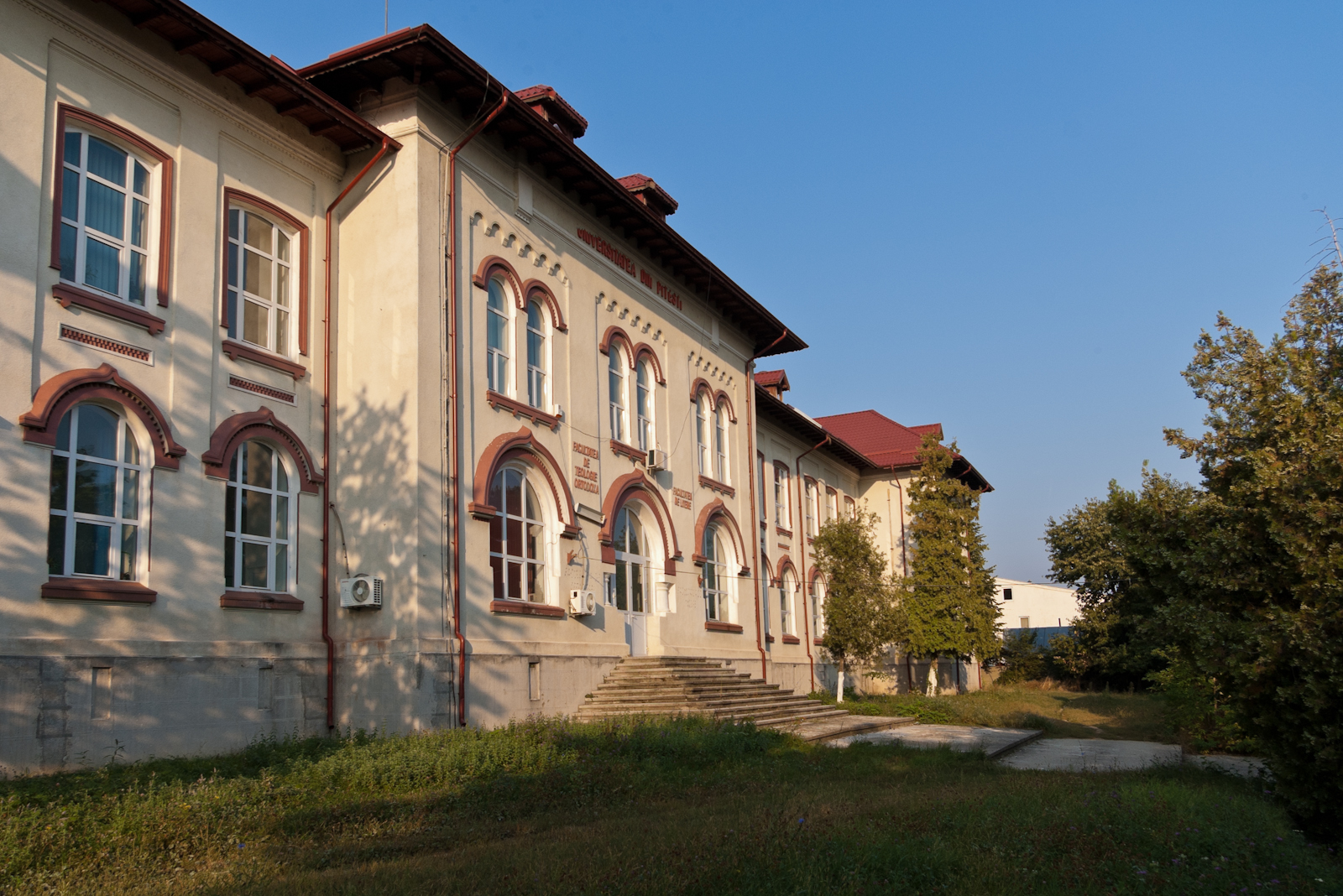
Faculty of Orthodox Theology at the University of Pitești

The city houses two universities: the state-run University of Pitești and the private Constantin Brâncoveanu University (founded 1991, with branches in Brăila and Râmnicu Vâlcea). There are 17 secondary education institutions, including two main high schools—the Ion Brătianu National College (founded 1866) and the Zinca Golescu National College. There are also 20 primary schools, 23 kindergartens and 10 nursery schools.

A public library, named after intellectual figure Dinicu Golescu, was planned in 1869 by Paraschiva Stephu, a female member of the upper class, who drew up a will leaving 200 Austrian ducats for the purpose of creating a library. The institution became operational in 1880, and a large part of the volumes were bequeathed by historian George Ionescu-Gion immediately following his death in 1904. His donation included over a thousand books in Romanian, French and Italian. The library moved into its current headquarters in the city center in 2003.

=== Festivals ===
Each year during springtime, Pitești is host to a festival and fair known as Simfonia lalelelor (the "Tulip Symphony"). Tulips were introduced locally in 1972–1973, when around 3,000 bulbs brought from Arad and Oradea were planted in its central area, along with other flowers. Pitești consequently acquired a reputation as a tulip-growing area, and the flower-themed festival was first organized by the local authorities in 1978. Typically held in the cultural centre building (Casa Cărții), the festival also includes folk music performances, international scientific conferences, an art exhibit and youth sport competitions.

== Sport ==
The major football club in the city is FC Argeș Pitești, which has generally played in Liga I, and has the Nicolae Dobrin Stadium as its home ground. In addition, the city was home to a Liga II football club, Internațional Pitești (located on Stadionul Ștrand), and has a school which doubles as a junior team, Sporting Pitești. Pitești hosts basketball team BCM U Pitești, as well as a women's volleyball team, Argeș Volei Pitești.

Pitești is home to an Olympic size swimming pool, the home ground for CSM Pitești, and a public outdoor swimming pool in the Tudor Vladimirescu area. Nearby Bascov also has a public swimming place, on grounds adjacent to the Budeasa Dam. The national canoe racing also trains at the Budeasa Dam sports base, and the location is also used for recreational fishing. A tennis challenger tournament (Turneul challenger feminin Pitești) takes place each year, on grounds in Bascov.

== Gallery ==
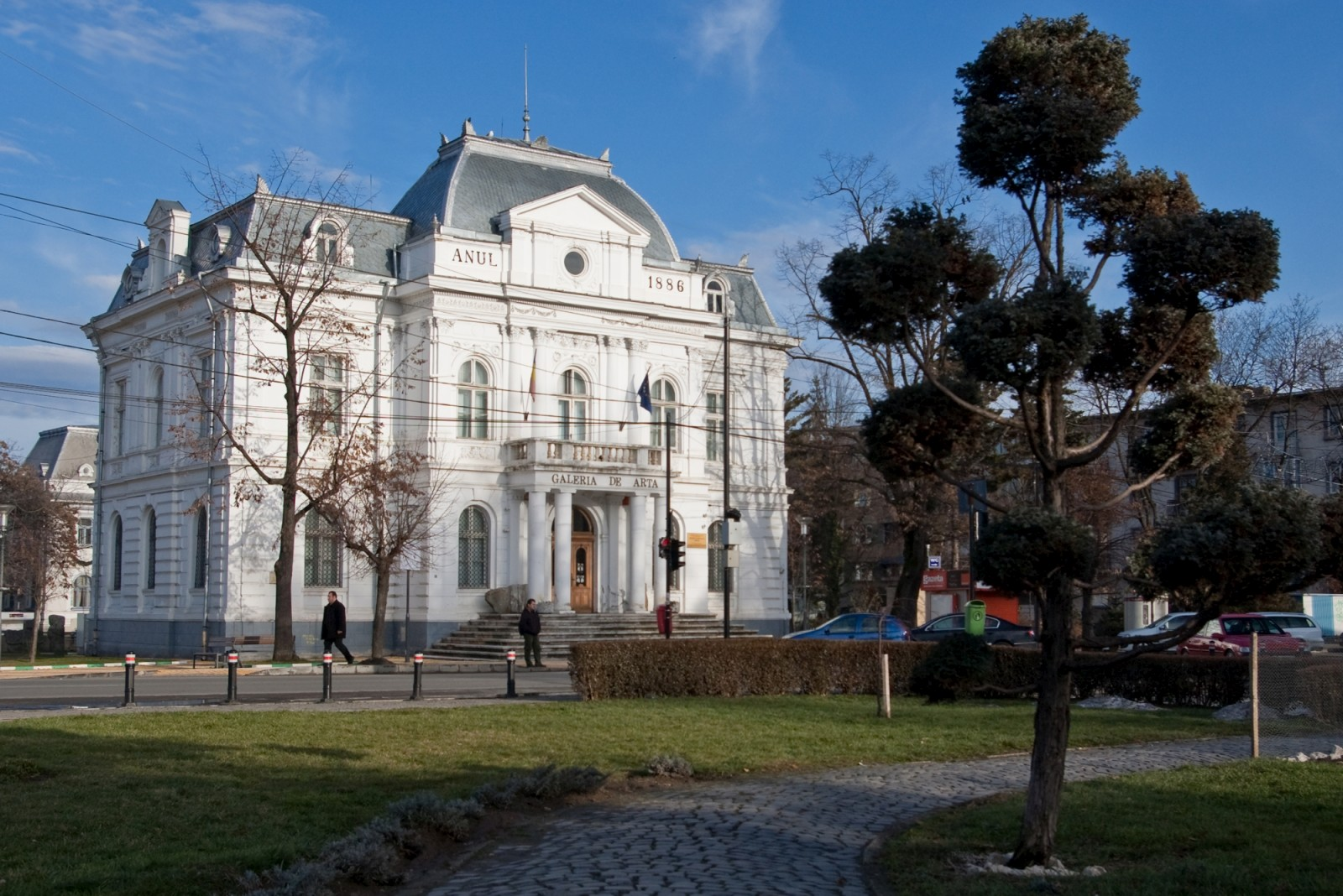
Pitești Art Museum

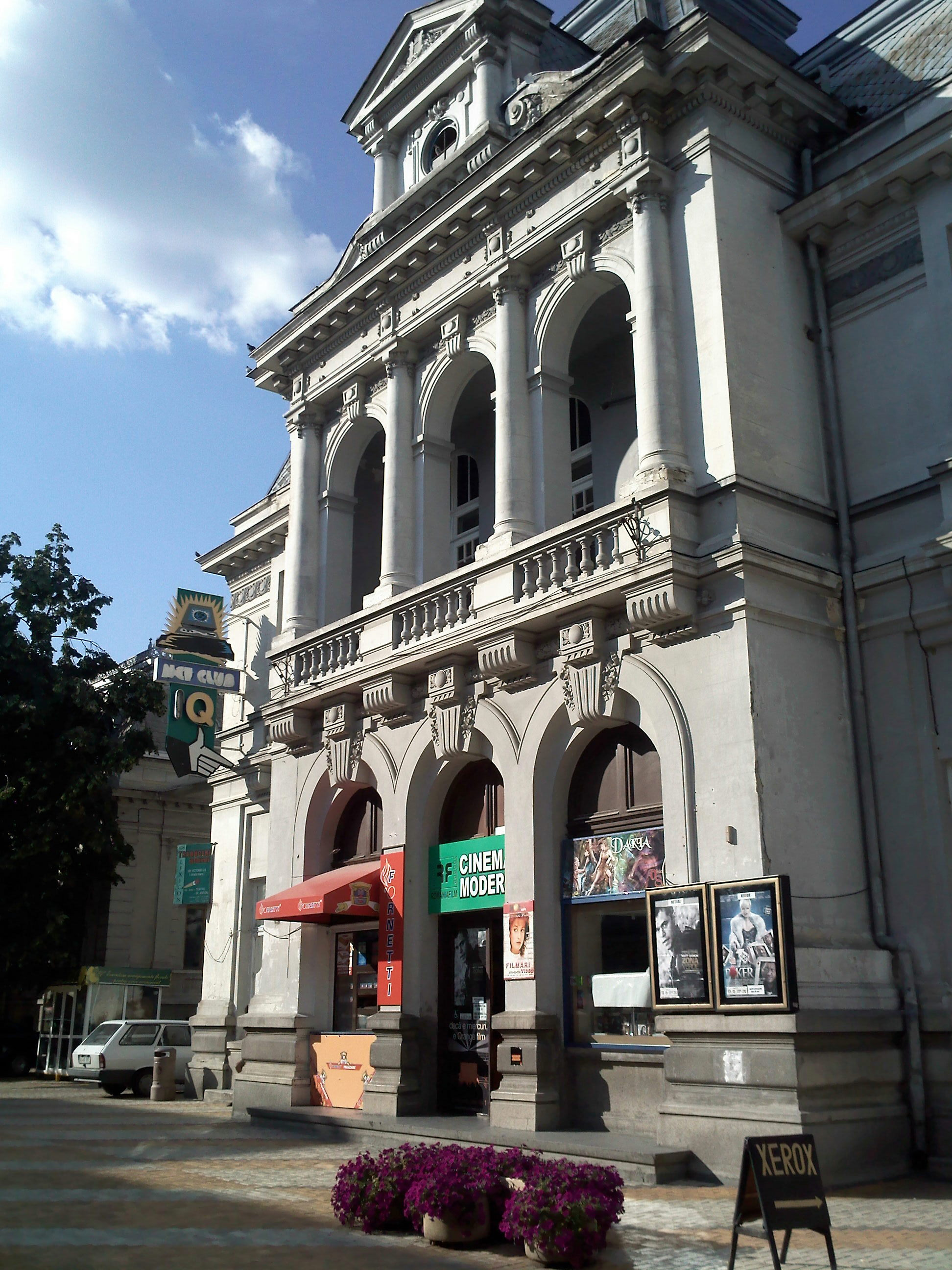
Cinema Modern in central Pitești

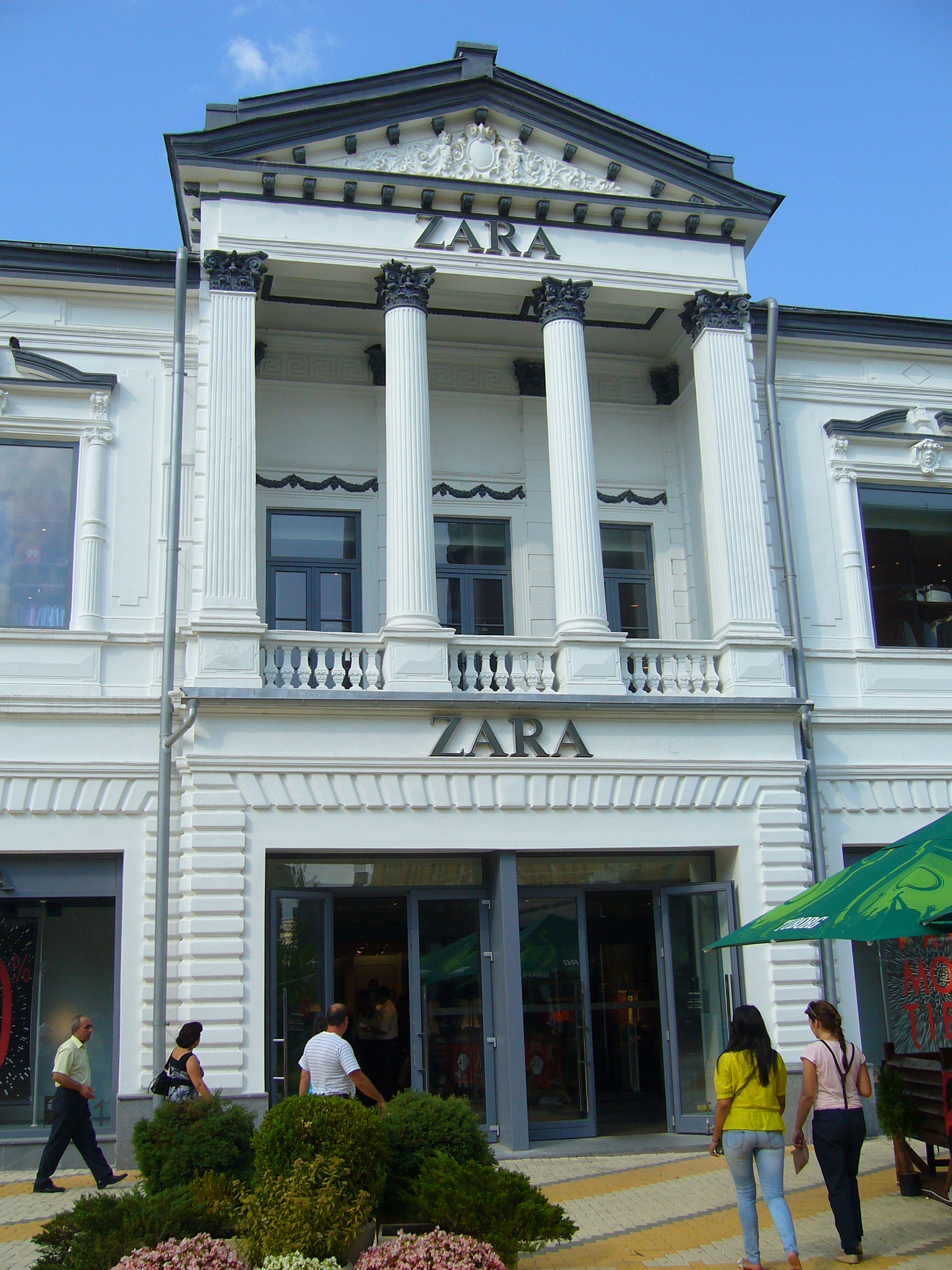
Old building on Victoriei Street

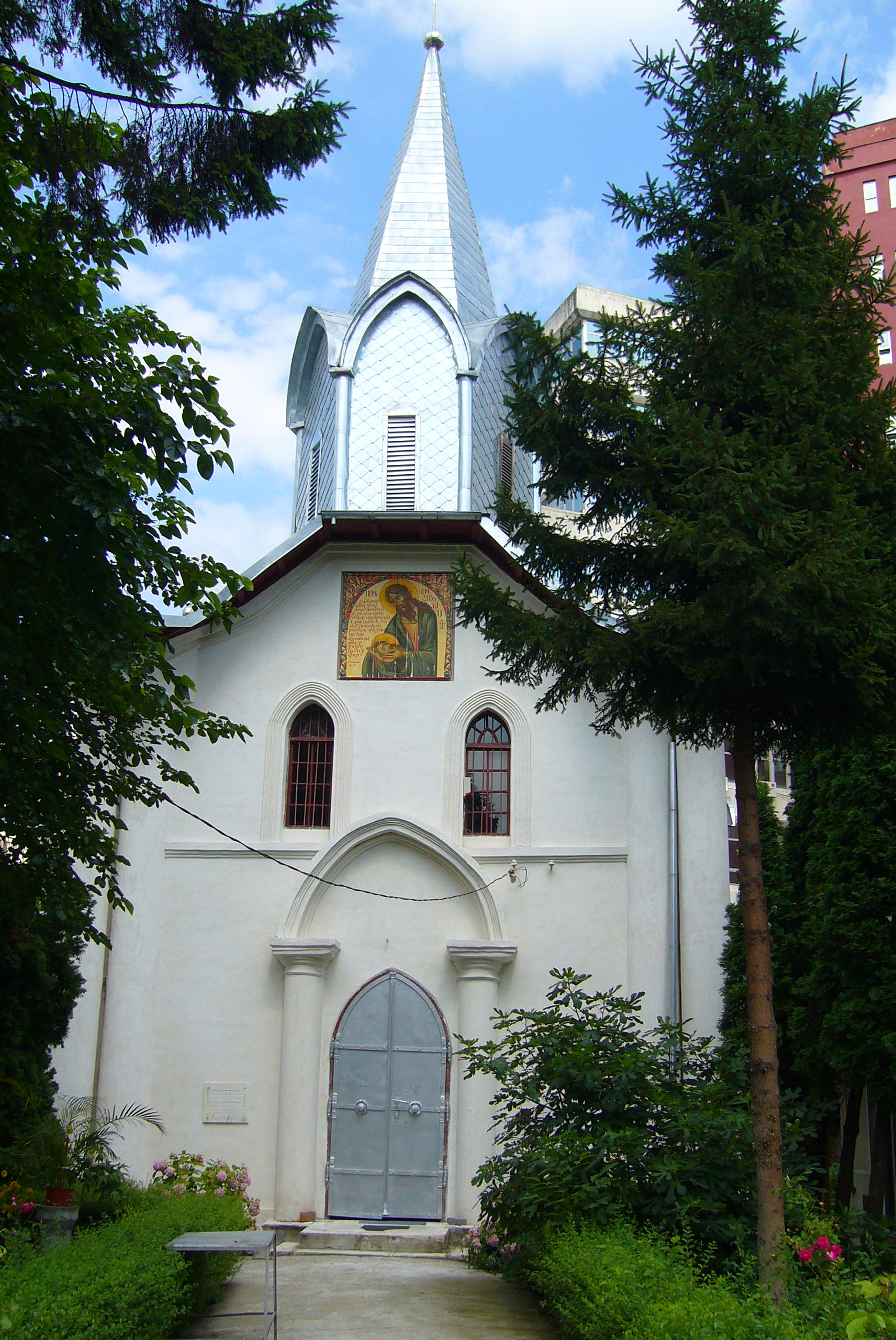
The Armenian Apostolic church

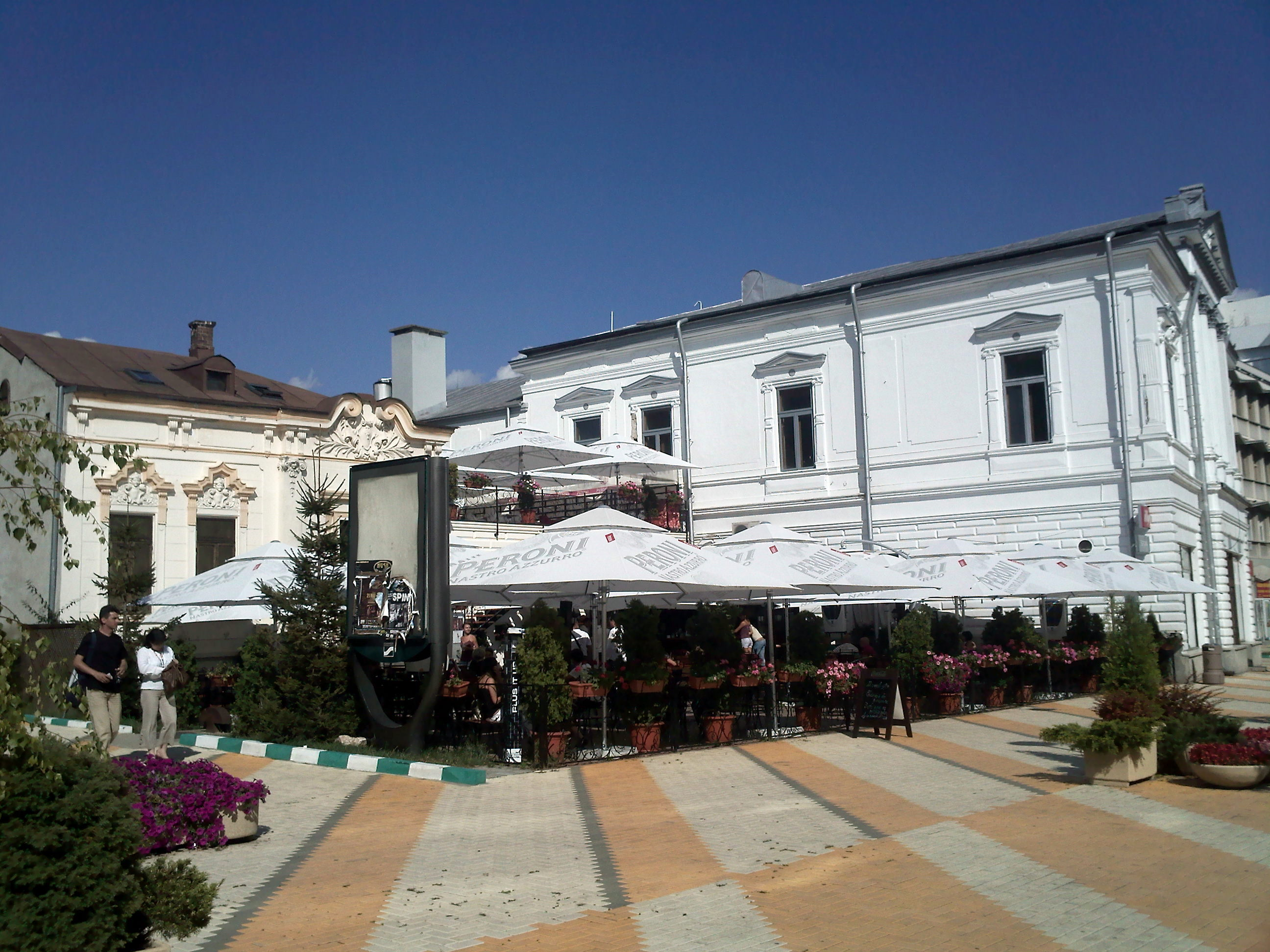
Old buildings on Victoriei Street

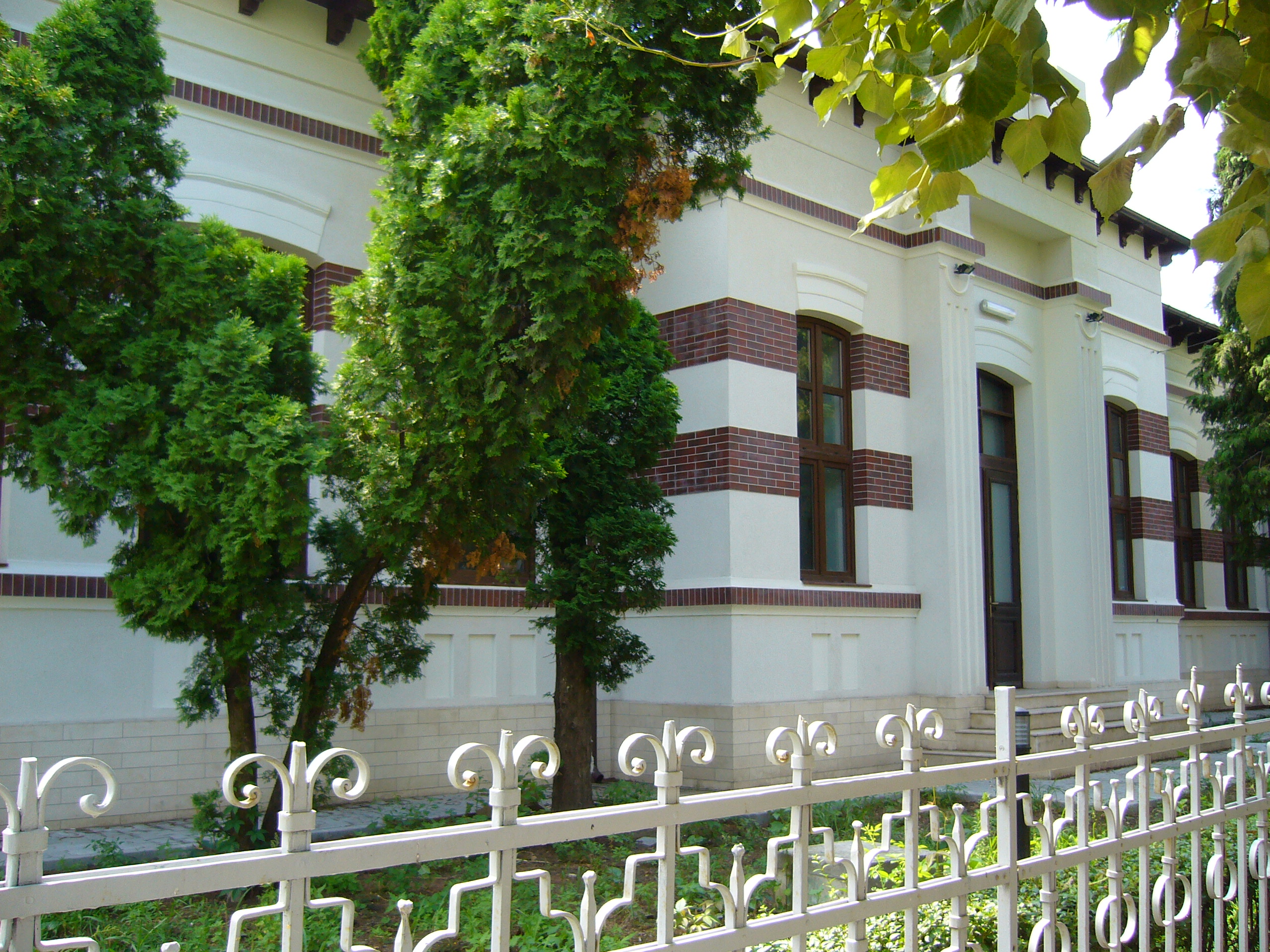
The Dinu Lipatti Art High School

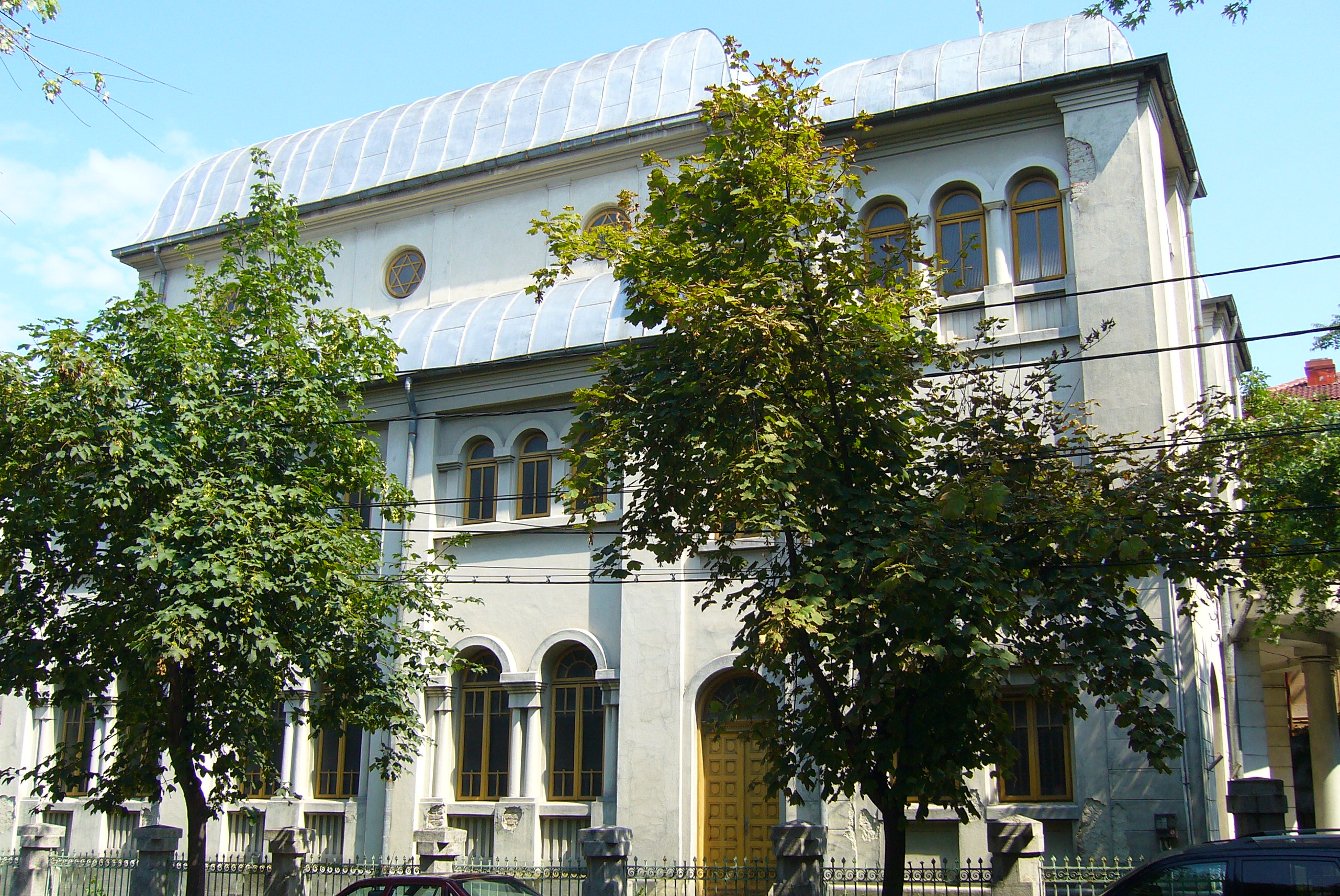
The Pitești Synagogue

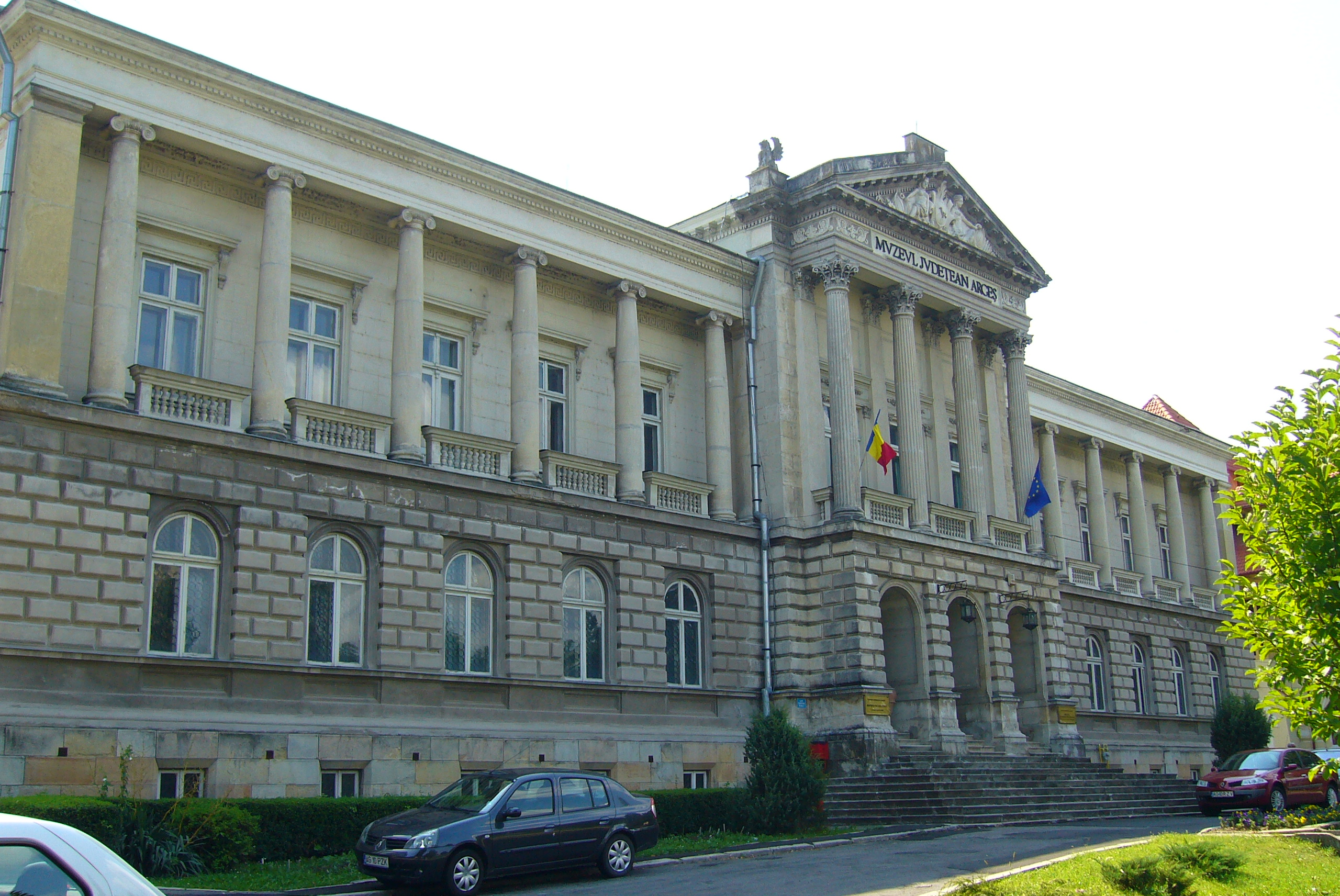
City Museum

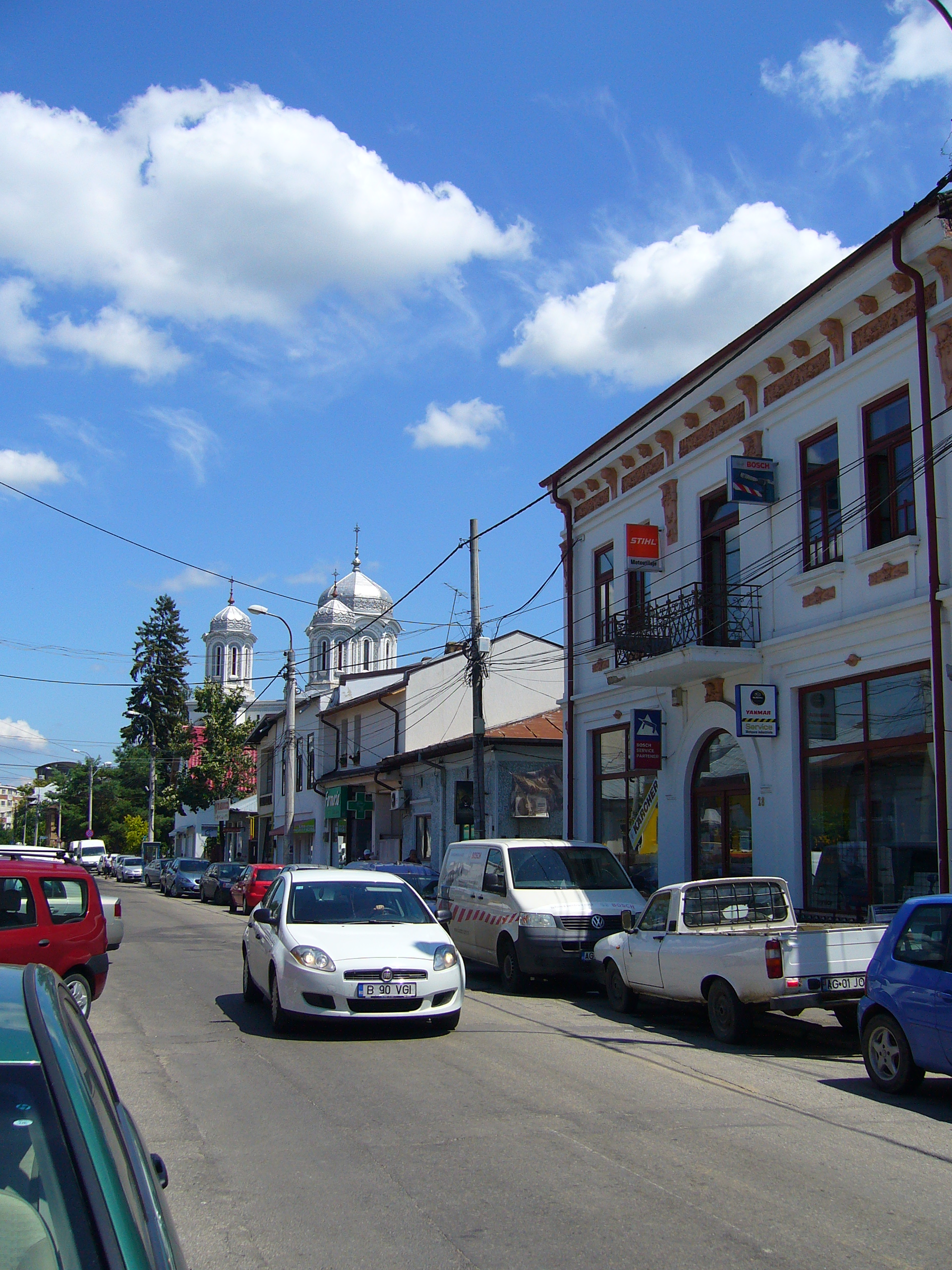
View of Sfânta Vineri Street

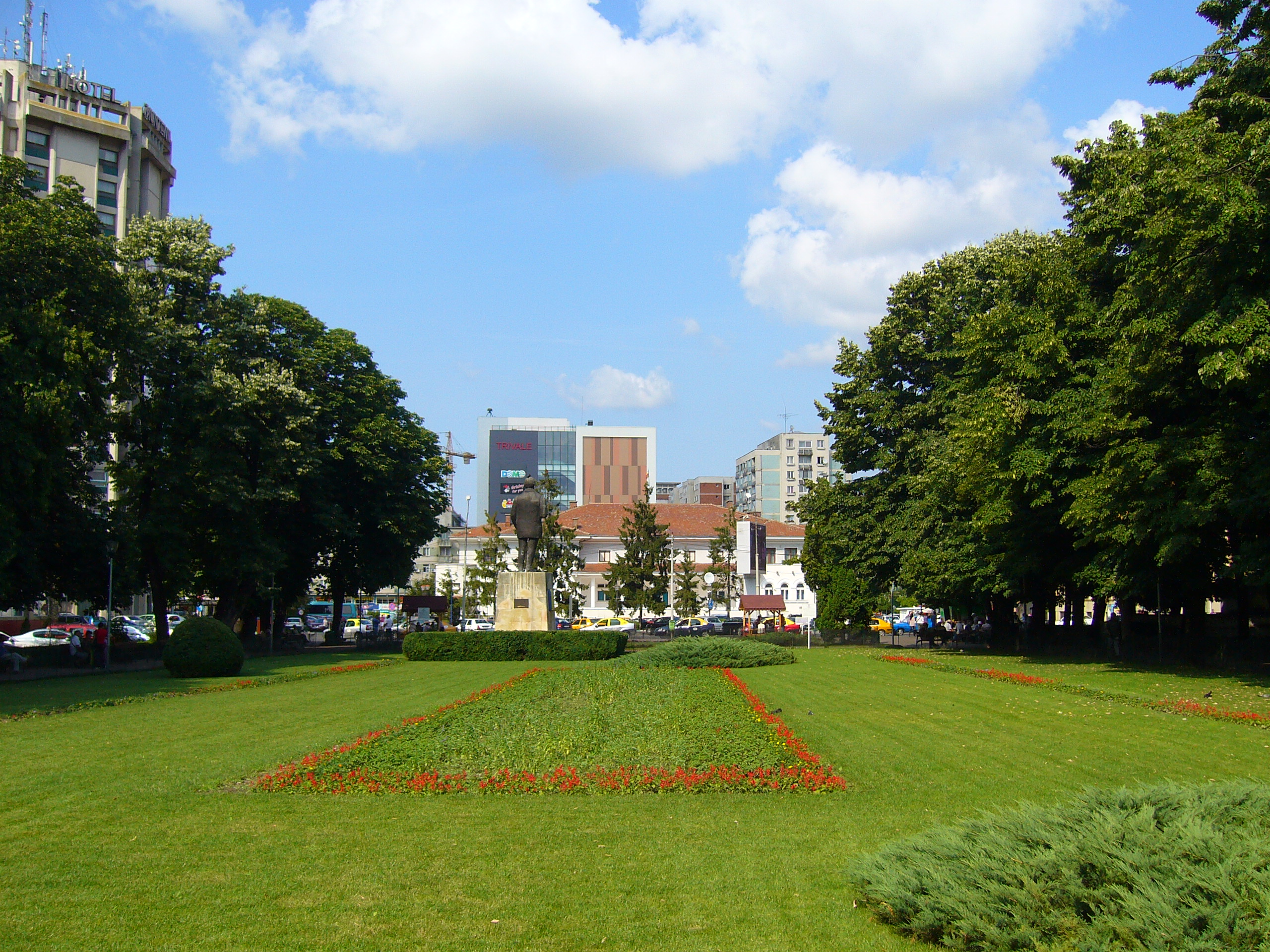
1907 Park

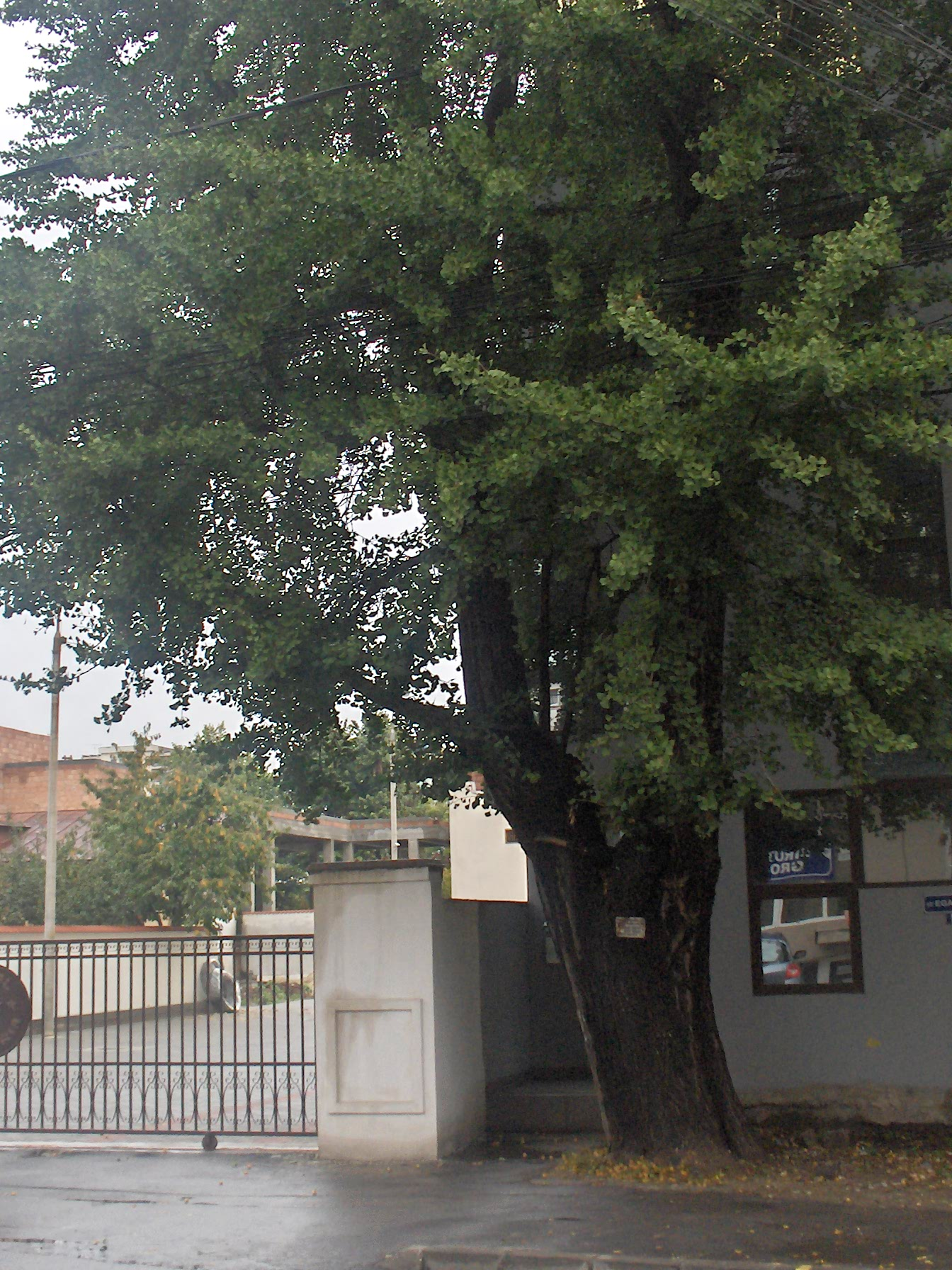
Protected tree on Egalității Street

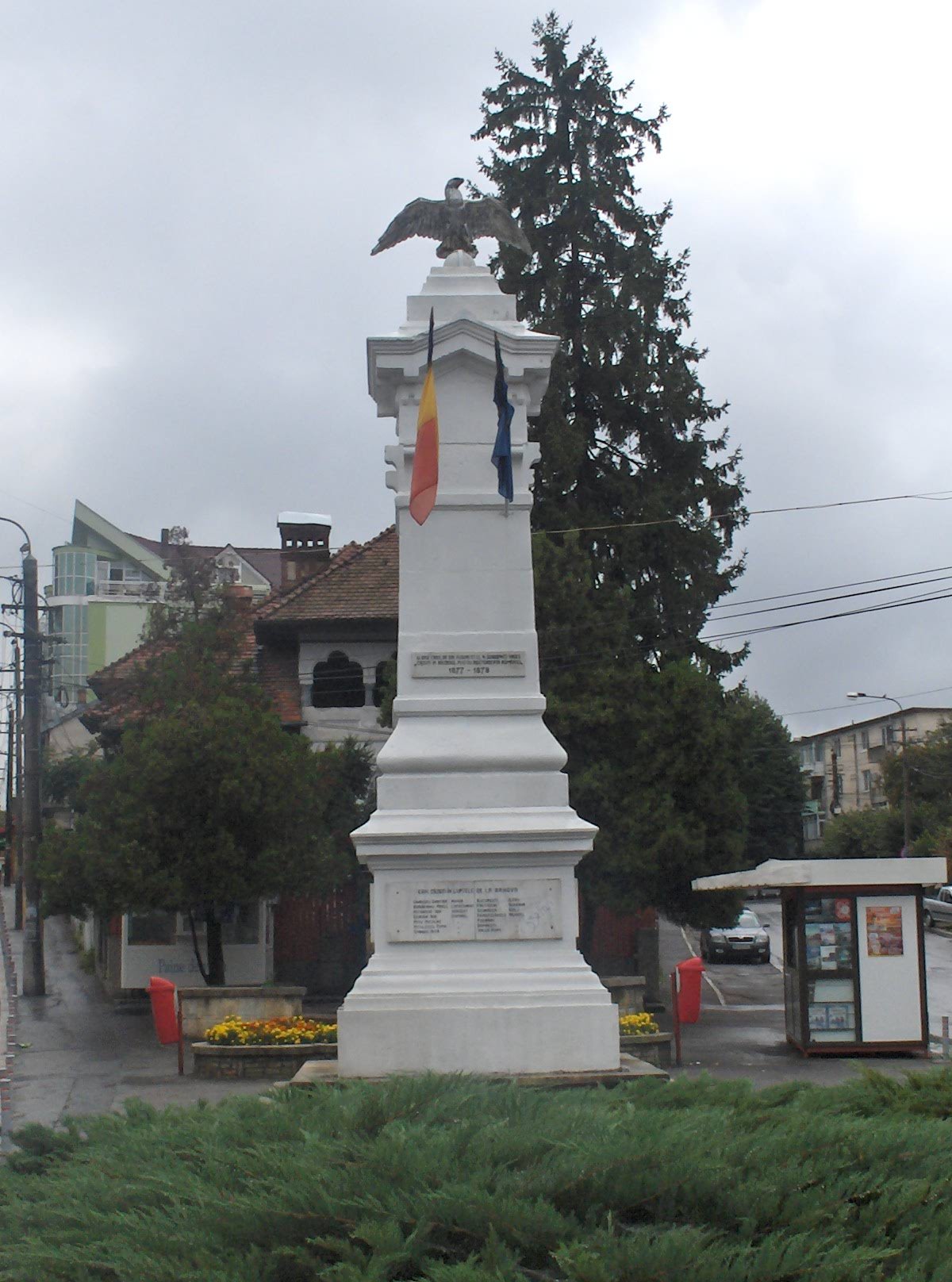
Memorial to soldiers fallen in the Russo-Turkish War (1877–1878)

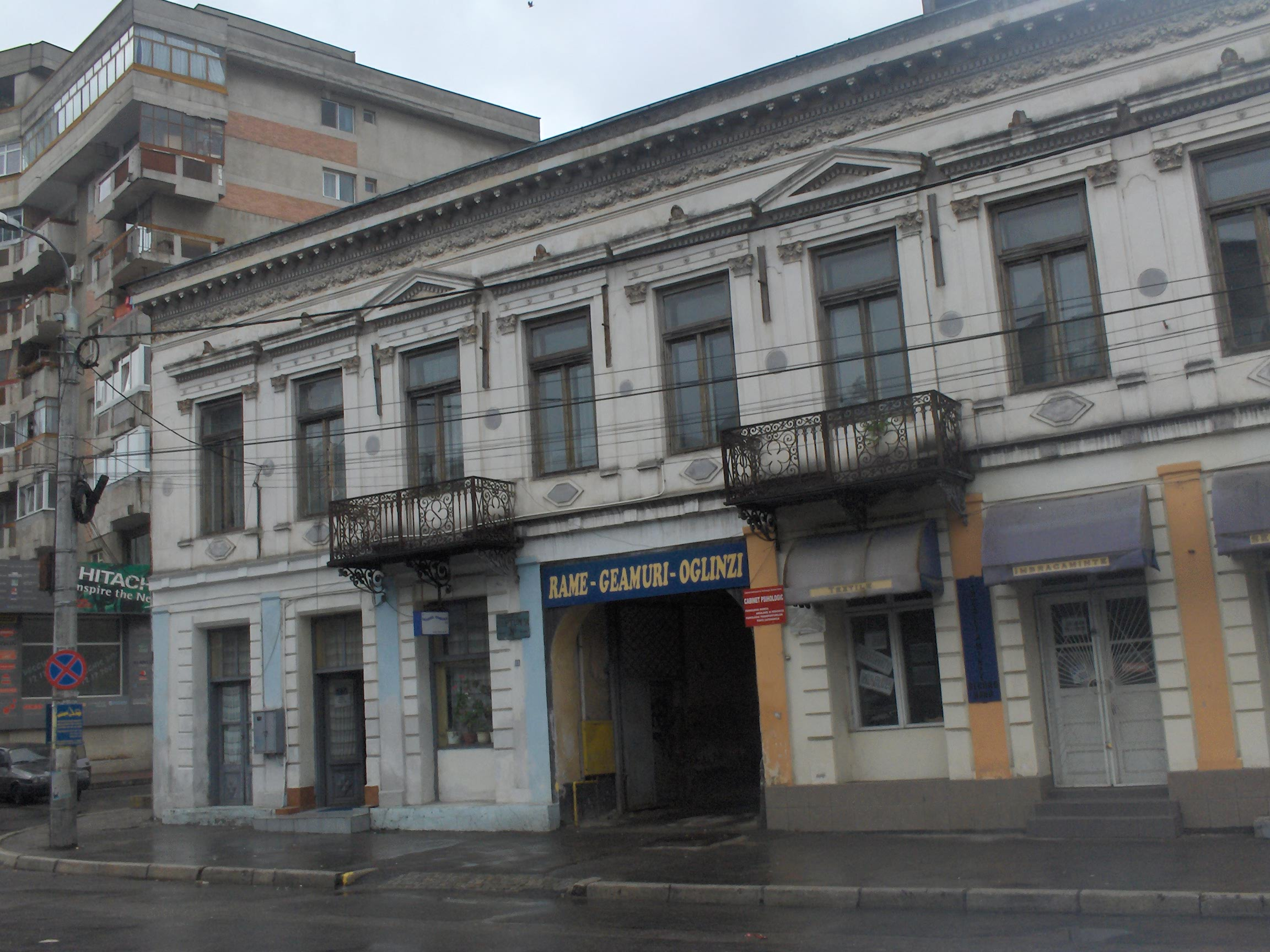
Townhouse (Gabroveni Inn) on Sfânta Vineri Street

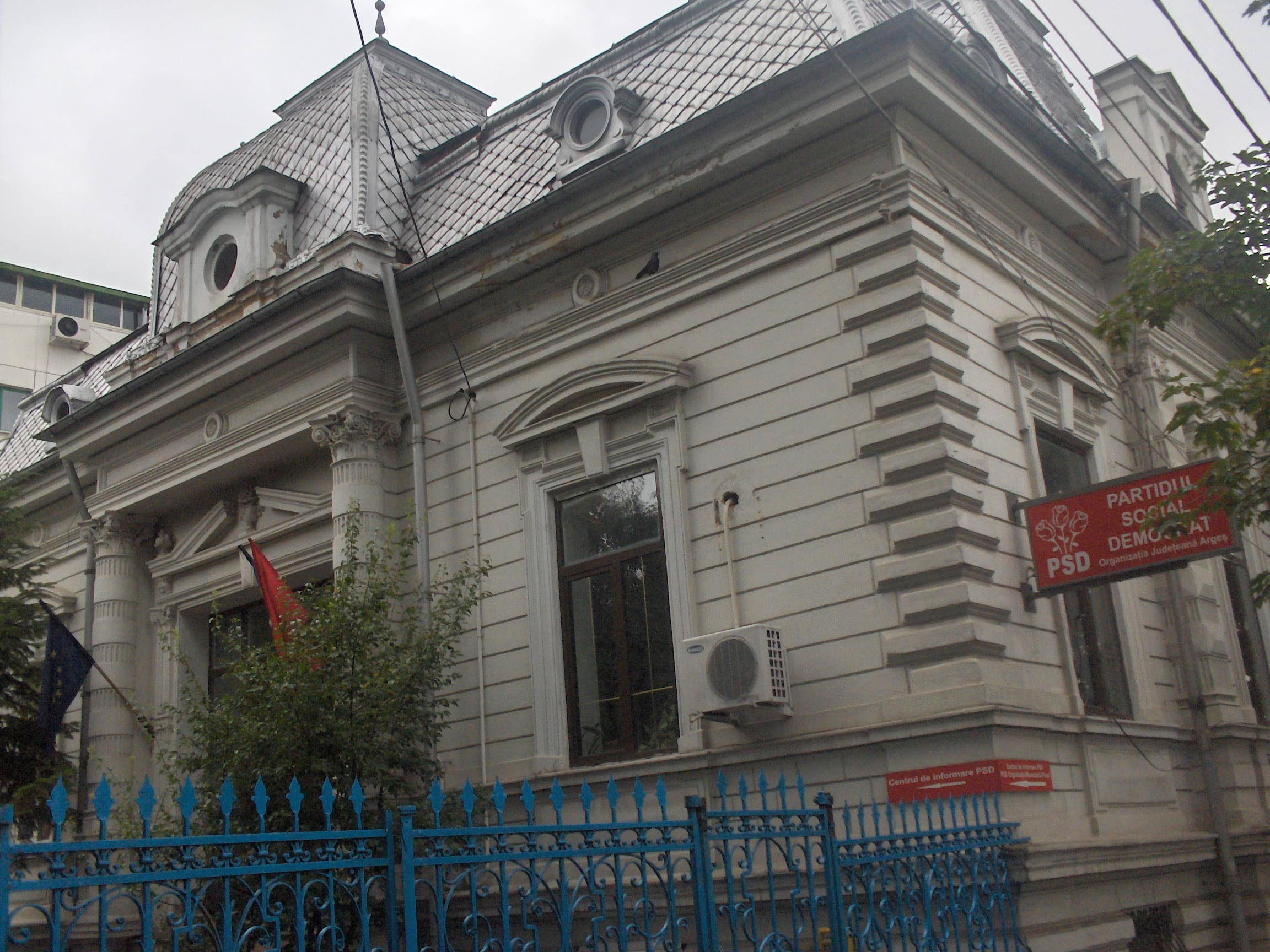
Historical building and Social Democratic Party headquarters

== Notable people ==
- Ion Antonescu
- Ilie Bărbulescu
- Mauriciu Blank
- Alexandru Bogdan-Pitești
- Dimitrie Brătianu
- Ion Brătianu
- Armand Călinescu
- Corneliu Calotescu
- Nicolae Comănescu
- Nicolae Dică
- Nicolae Dobrin
- Ruxandra Dragomir
- Haralamb H. Georgescu
- Al. Gherghel
- Gheorghe Ionescu-Gion
- Alexandru Kirițescu
- Cristian Minculescu
- Adrian Neaga
- Marian Oprea
- Gabriela Pană Dindelegan
- Constance Pascal
- Sebastian Papaiani
- Jean Parvulesco
- Mircea Pârligras
- Nicolae Penescu
- Costin Petrescu
- Rudolf Schweitzer-Cumpăna
- Ioan Sion
- Smiley
- Lavinia Stan
- Bogdan Stancu
- Cleo Stieber
- Cristian Tănase
- Tudor Teodorescu-Braniște
- Teo Trandafir
- Ion Trivale
- Lucian Turcescu
- Robert Turcescu
- Adrian Ungur
- Zavaidoc

== Twin towns – sister cities ==
Pitești is twinned with:

- Beit Jala, Palestine
- Borlänge, Sweden
- Bydgoszcz, Poland
- Caserta, Italy
- Chongqing, China
- Gyumri, Armenia
- Kragujevac, Serbia
- Muntinlupa, Philippines
- Nafplio, Greece
- Ourém, Portugal
- Springfield, Ohio, United States
- Tynaarlo, Netherlands
