= Armenian Church, Pitești =

Apostolic church in Pitești, Romania

Coordinates: 44.8529°N 24.8768°E

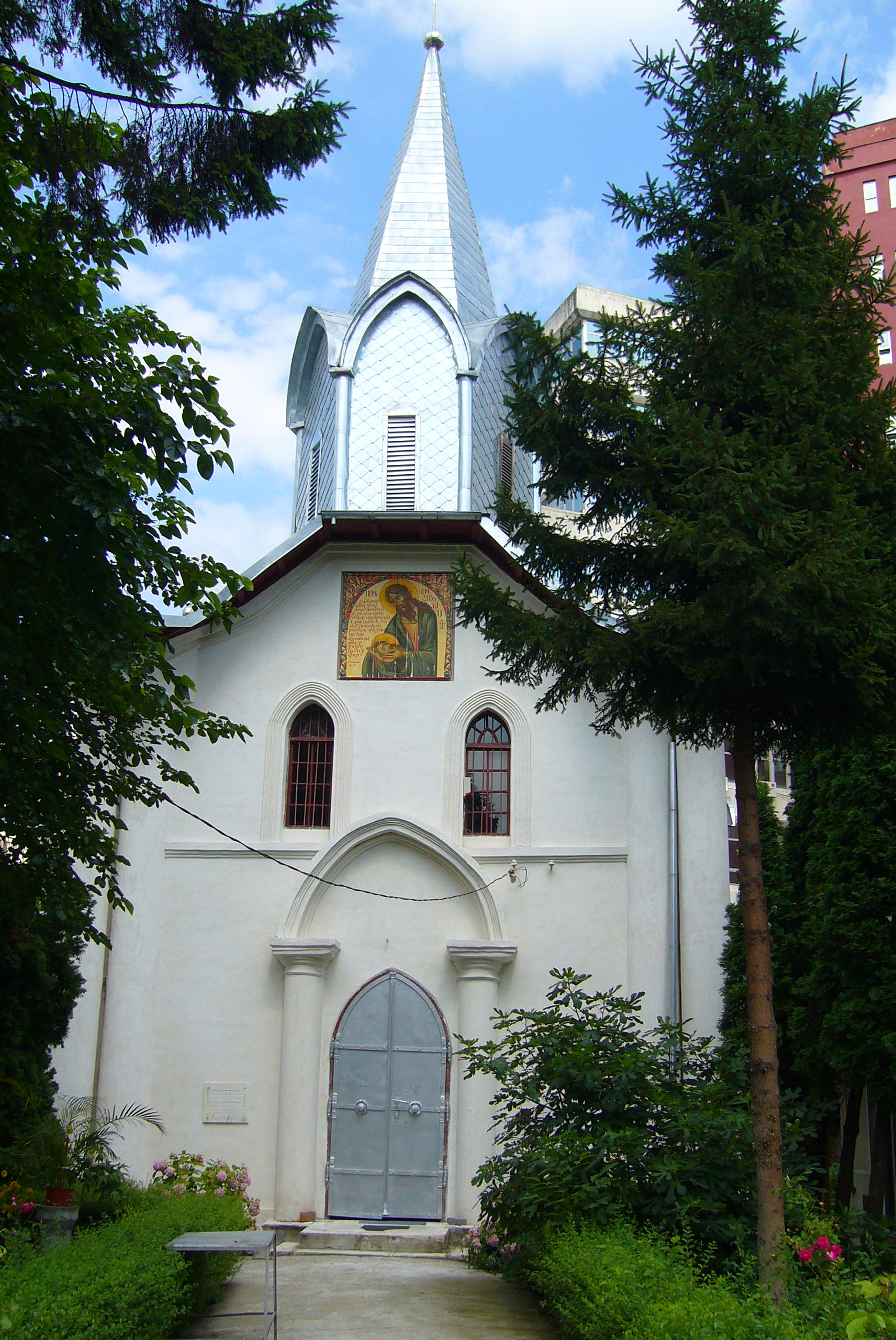
Armenian Church

The Armenian Church (Romanian: Biserica Armenească) is an Armenian Apostolic church located at 43 Egalității Street in Pitești, Romania. It is dedicated to John the Baptist.

Built in 1852, the church is trefoil in shape, with a hexagonal spire. It is listed as a historic monument by Romania's Ministry of Culture and Religious Affairs, as is its chancery, which dates to the same year.
