= Armenian Church, Focșani =

Heritage site in Vrancea County, Romania

Coordinates: 45°41′45″N 27°10′47″E

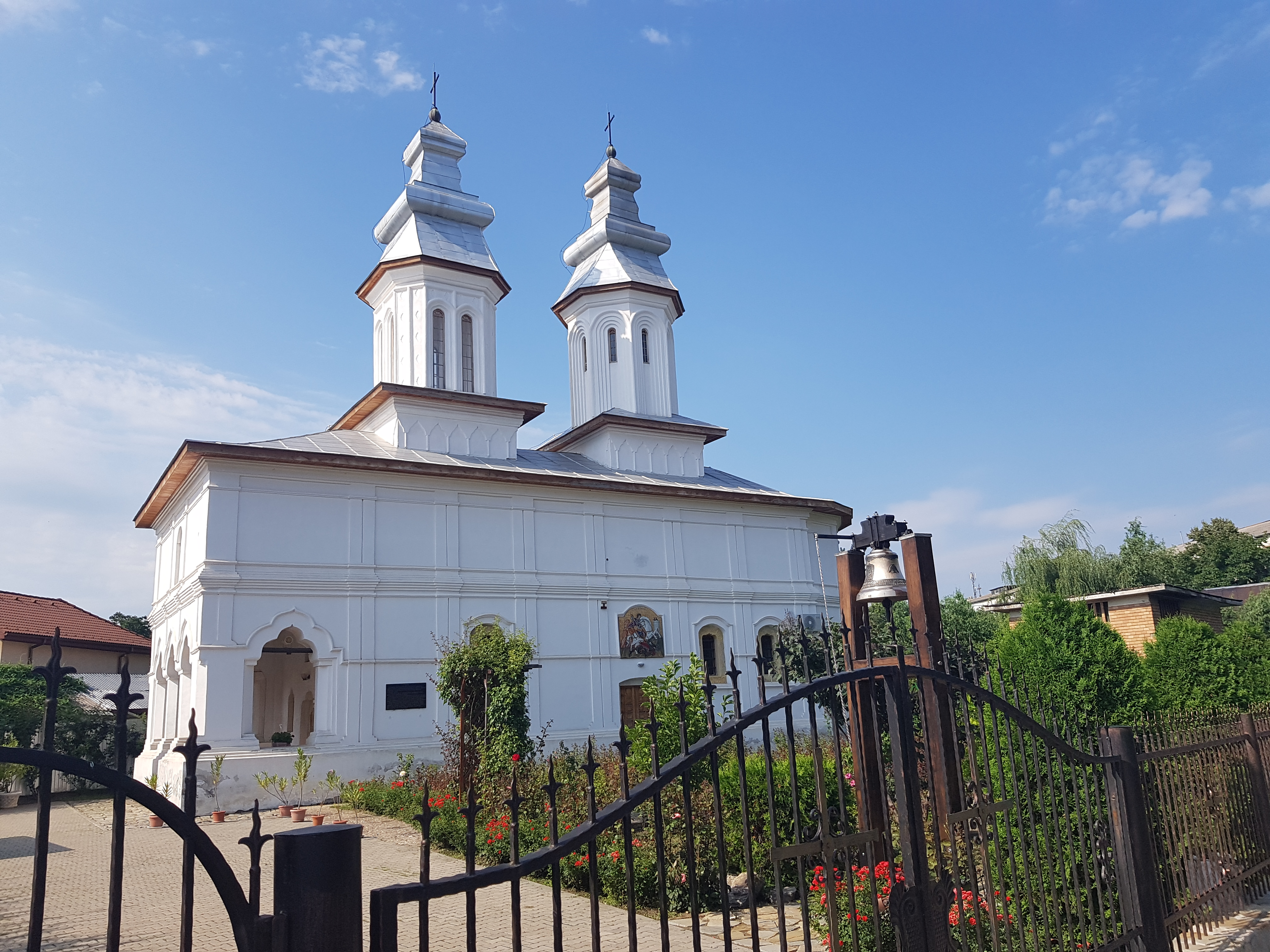
Armenian Church

The Armenian Church (Romanian: Biserica Armenească Sfântul Gheorghe) is an Armenian Apostolic church located at 22 Cotești Street in Focșani, Romania. It is dedicated to Saint George.

Built by local Armenians in the 18th century, the church sits on the site of a wooden church from 1600. A 1738 document mentions the sale of the plot. An Austrian map of 1789 depicts the church as incomplete.

It is in the Brâncovenesc style, ship-shaped with porch, narthex, nave and altar. The porch features arches that rest on octagonal stone columns. The door and window frames are decorated with plant motifs carved into the stone. Originally, the church had two octagonal spires above the narthex and nave, made of brick on square bases.

The church is listed as a historic monument by Romania's Ministry of Culture and Religious Affairs, which supplies a completion date of 1789.
