= Armenian Church, Brăila =

Armenian Apostolic church in Brăila, Romania

St. Mary Armenian Church
- St. Mary Armenian Church
- 45°16′26.22″N 27°58′25.353″E
- Location: Brăila, Romania
- Denomination: Armenian Apostolic

The St. Mary Armenian Church (Romanian: Biserica Armeană Sfânta Maria) is an Armenian Apostolic church in Brăila, Romania. It was first established by the Armenian community of Brăila in 1828 and was made of green wood planks. However, the old church burned down in 1843 and was demolished. Efforts to reconstruct the church were started on 1 May 1868 and completed on 4 July 1872. The church fell into disrepair during World War I as a result of the occupation of Romania, including Brăila, by the Central Powers which provoked the fleeing of many Armenians from the city.

In 1934, industrialist Grigore Berziveanu undertook renovation works on the church. The last Armenian priest of Brăila, Garibian, died in 1962, and the Armenian church has ever since only held services with the assistance of Armenian priests from other cities throughout Romania. Today, the Armenian Church of Brăila is used as a gathering point by the small Armenian community of the city, composed of some fourteen families as of 2005.
