= Visarion Puiu =

Romanian Eastern Orthodox bishop

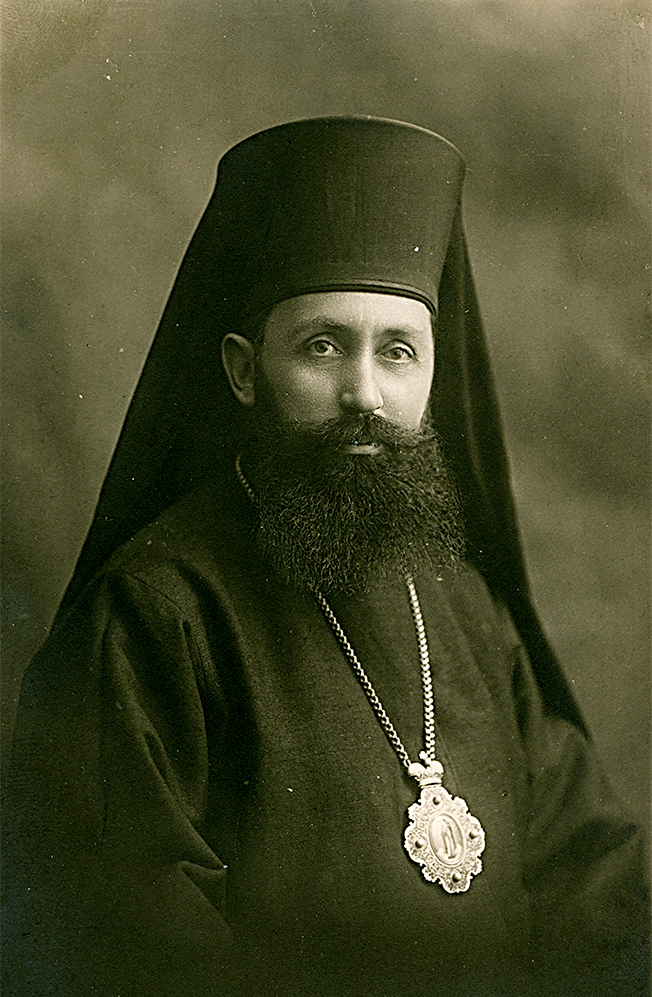
- Visarion Puiu as bishop in the 1930s
- Church: Romanian Orthodox Church; Russian Orthodox Church Outside of Russia (after 1954)
- Archdiocese: Chernivtsi
- Metropolis: Bukovina
- Installed: 10 November 1935
- Term ended: May 1940 or March 1941
- Predecessor: Nectarie Cotlarciuc
- Successor: Tit Simedrea
- Other posts: Bishop of Argeș (1921–1923); Bishop of Hotin (1923–1935); Exarch of Transnistria (1942–1943); Bishop of the Romanian Orthodox Diocese of Western Europe (1948–1958)

Orders
- Ordination: 1908
- Consecration: 17 October 1935

Personal details
- Born: February 27, 1879 Pașcani, Romania
- Died: August 10, 1964 (aged 85) Paris or Viels-Maisons, France
- Denomination: Eastern Orthodox Church
- Profession: Theologian
- Education: Kyiv-Mohyla Academy

Visarion Puiu (Romanian pronunciation: [visariˈon ˈpuju]; sometimes Bessarion in French; born Victor Puiu on 27 February 1879 in Pașcani, Romania – 10 August 1964 in Paris or Viels-Maisons, France) was a metropolitan bishop of the Romanian Orthodox Church. During World War II, at a time when Romania was an ally of Nazi Germany, he served as the leading Eastern Orthodox clergyman in occupied Transnistria, a territory where several hundred thousand Jews were murdered. In August 1944, when Romania switched sides, he took refuge in Nazi Germany.

After the war, he lived in Italy and Switzerland before finally settling in France. In 1946, he was sentenced to death in absentia by the Bucharest People's Tribunal. He created the Romanian Orthodox Diocese of Western Europe under the authority of the Russian Orthodox Church Outside of Russia, and for a few years played an important role in the Romanian diaspora. The Holy Synod in Bucharest defrocked Puiu in 1950, but posthumously restored him among its clergy in 1990. Puiu's connections to the Iron Guard, as well as his responsibility in the Holocaust, have been the subject of scholarly publications in the post-communist era.

== Early life and monastic career ==
Victor Puiu was born on 27 February 1879 in Pașcani, Romania. He attended a local primary school before pursuing an education in seminaries in Roman (1893–1896) and Iași (1896–1900). He graduated from the University of Bucharest's Faculty of Theology in 1905 and became a monk in Roman on 22 December 1905. He took the monastic name Visarion and was ordained a deacon three days later. From January 1907 to July 1908, he studied at the Kyiv-Mohyla Academy in Kyiv, in the Russian Empire. From 1905 to 1908, he was a deacon within the Cathedral of the Holy Voievodes in Roman and in 1908 he transferred to the Cathedral of Saint Nicholas in Galați. There, on 6 December 1908, he was ordained a priest, being elevated to the dignity of Archimandrite on 1 January 1909. Three months later, he was named director of the Galați Theological Seminary and Vicar of the Archbishopric of the Lower Danube. On 1 September 1918, he became director of the Chișinău Theological Seminary in Bessarabia and, two months later, exarch of the province's monasteries. Romanian historian and nationalist politician Nicolae Iorga described him as "one of the most educated Romanian Orthodox clerics".

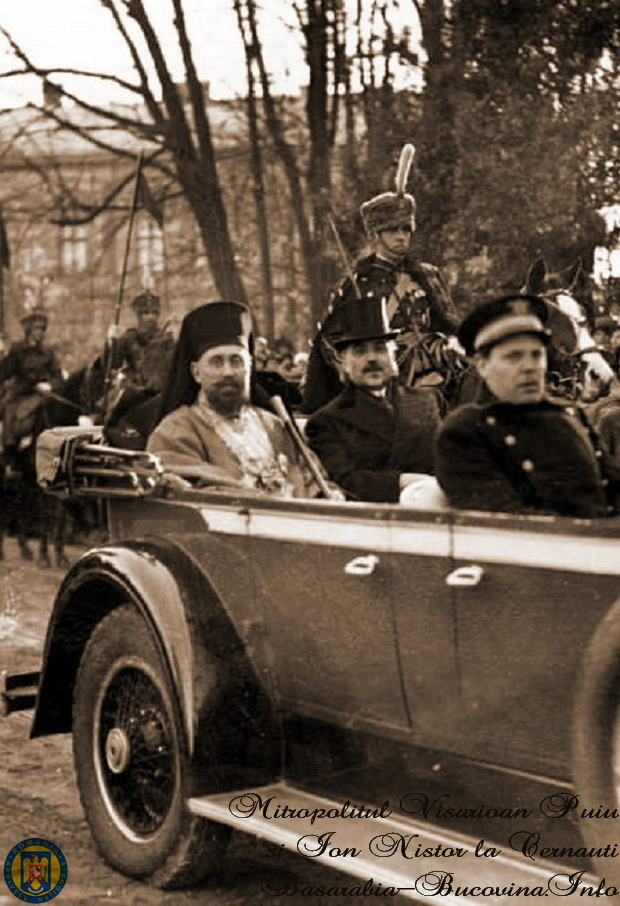
Visarion Puiu and Ion Nistor in Cernăuți, 1918

On 17 March 1921, Puiu was elected Bishop of Argeș. He was consecrated in that position on 25 March by Metropolitan of Wallachia Miron Cristea in the Bucharest Metropolitan Cathedral and invested into the office that day by King Ferdinand. Two days later, he was installed in the episcopal chair at the Curtea de Argeș Cathedral; he remained there for two years. In 1923 he moved to Bălți as bishop of Hotin, where he remained until 1935. From this position, he organized theological schools, printing houses, the Clergy’s Aid House, and church workshops attached to monasteries. He restored 397 churches and 40 parish houses, built a candle factory, a sanatorium, and constructed six churches in Bălți. According to Florin Ţuscanu, he worked alongside the Romanian authorities to improve the living conditions of the city’s inhabitants, ensuring access to water and electricity, developing railway transport, rebuilding the sewage system, and overseeing the construction of an airfield, a slaughterhouse, a public bath, and a maternity hospital. During his tenure in Bălți, Visarion Puiu came into conflict with the local Jewish community in 1924. The community had obtained approval to build a large synagogue on the foundation where an Orthodox church had originally been planned, even requesting that the Romanian authorities demolish the Christian foundation and grant the materials to the Jewish community for the synagogue. Visarion Puiu traveled to Bucharest to explain the situation; subsequently, the Ministry of Cults and Arts ordered the demolition of the synagogue’s walls, allowing the construction of the Christian church to proceed. At its consecration, a flood of believers arrived from all the neighboring villages.

The political situation in Romania in the late 1920s and early 1930s was marked by the rise of a fascist movement known as the Legion of the Archangel Michael. The Legion was founded in 1927 by Corneliu Zelea Codreanu as a breakaway group from A. C. Cuza's far-right antisemitic party called the National-Christian Defense League. Throughout the late 1920s and the early 1930s, the Legion steadily increased its membership among students, peasants, workers and tradesmen, but also among priests. The term "Iron Guard", often used nowadays as an alternative name for the Legion, only appeared in 1930 and originally designated the paramilitary branch of the organization.

In 1935, Puiu appointed Archimandrite Antim Nica exarch in charge of the monasteries in his Bishopric of Hotin. In the following years, under Puiu's influence, Nica would become a member of the Iron Guard and a teaching assistant of Iuliu Scriban. Scriban, Nica and Puiu would all three be involved in the future Romanian Orthodox Mission in Transnistria.

== Metropolitan of Bukovina ==
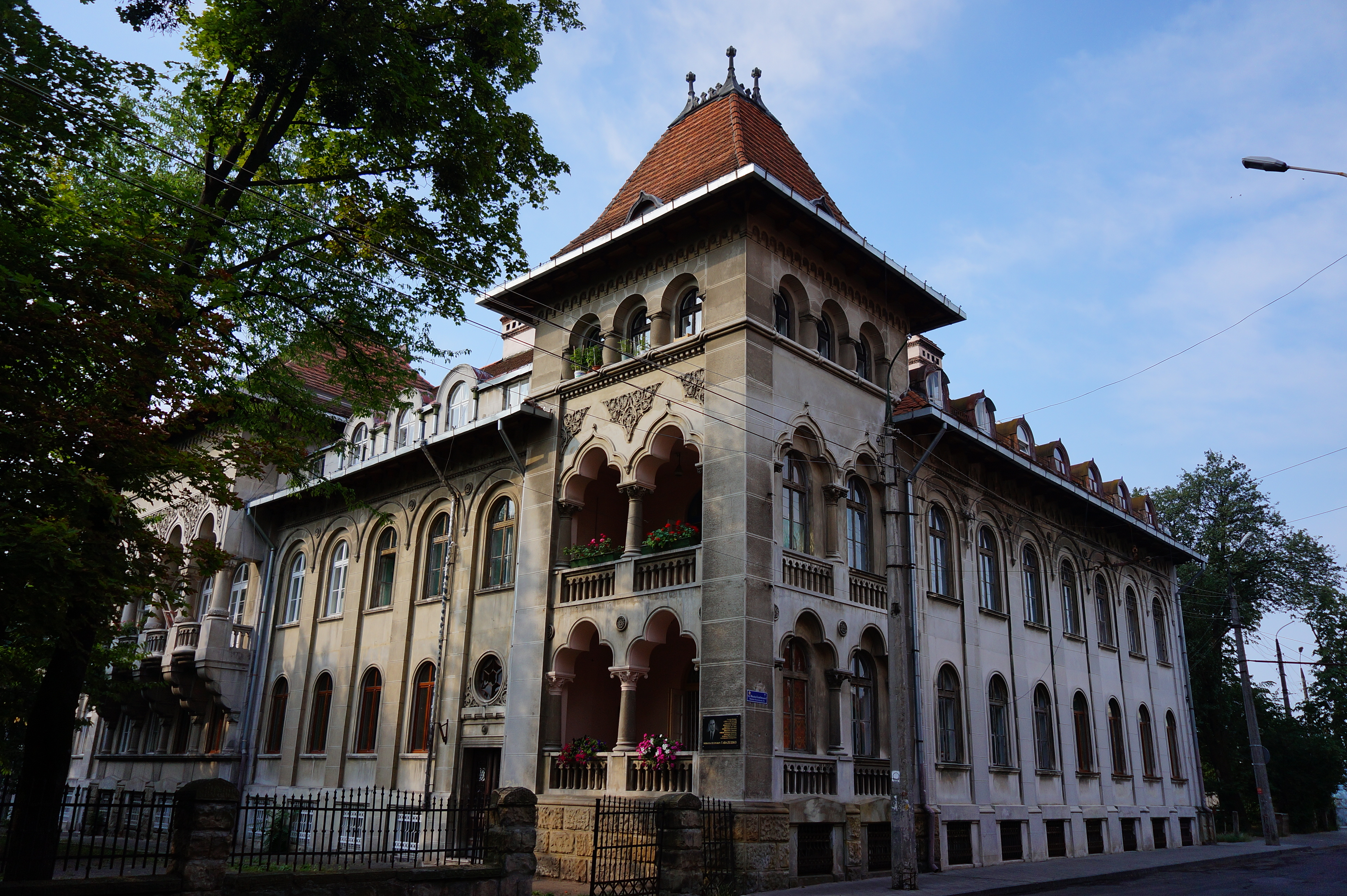
The new Metropolitan Palace of Cernăuți, where Visarion Puiu lived

Following the death of Nectarie Cotlarciuc, Visarion Puiu was elected Archbishop of Cernăuți (Chernivtsi) and Metropolitan of Bukovina on 17 October 1935. He was enthroned on 10 November, thus taking charge of a very wealthy metropolis. Prior to his appointment, the various assets were under secular management and no discrimination based on ethnicity was practiced. Under Puiu's leadership, however, contracts with businesses owned by Jews were terminated. He also started restricting the employment of ethnically non-Romanian individuals. The first press article supporting such policies of discrimination published in a periodical of the Bukovina Metropolis also appeared just weeks after Puiu's enthronement. Visarion Puiu was the main person involved in the foundation of the Romanian Orthodox Settlement in Jerusalem.

Puiu tended to refrain from explicit, public, political statements. He allowed antisemitic articles to be published in the Romanian Orthodox Church's periodicals in Bukovina and would do the same later-on in Transnistria, but the only time he penned a political text himself was in September 1936, in Cuvântul preoțesc ("The Priestly Word"), when he published The Church Facing the Communist Danger. Puiu's article endorsed the thesis of Judeo-Bolshevism and attacked other Christian denominations. One paragraph read: "It is very true that the majority of the communists are alien to our people, mainly Yids, but it is also true that their destructive ideas have lured a great number of unaware Romanians too. Some of them, especially peasants, are attracted by the communist enchantment through the sects which, without exception, are encouraged by the foreigners in order to destroy the Church."

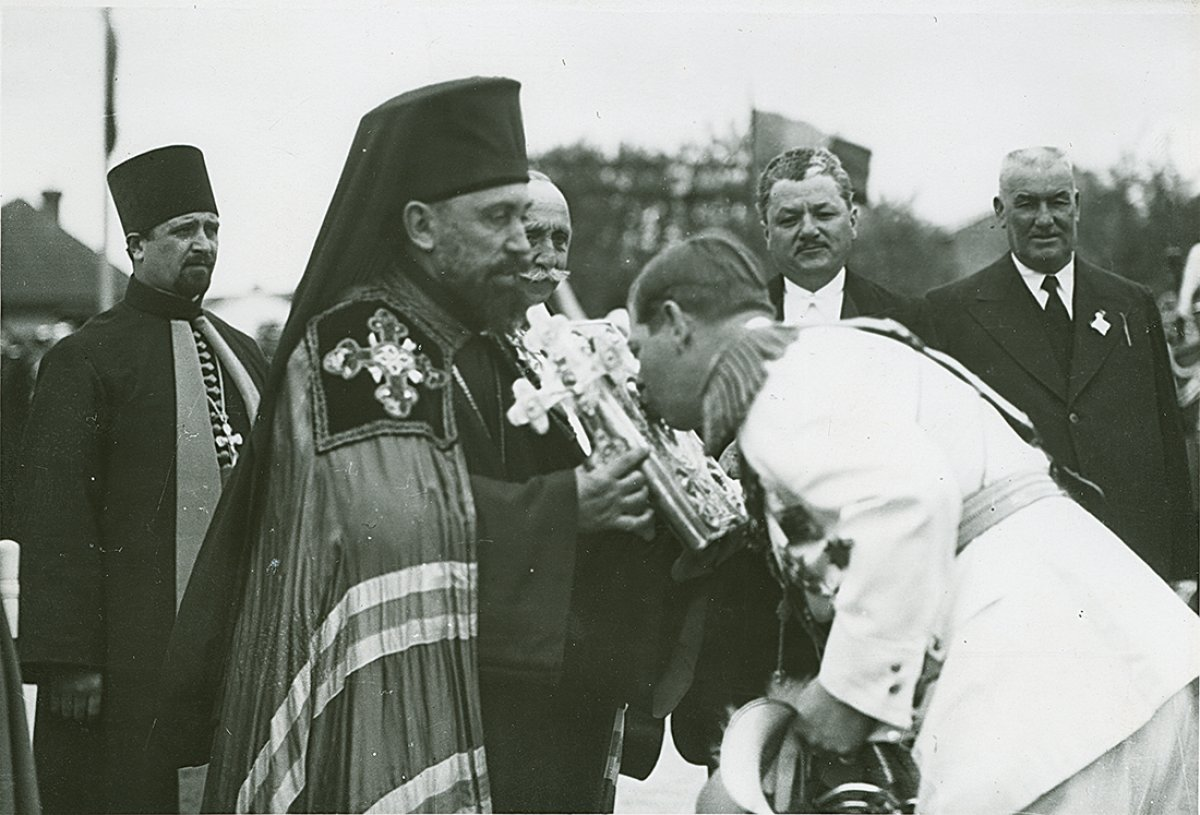
Metropolitan Visarion Puiu and King Carol II of Romania

Puiu's support for the Iron Guard materialized when he used his private funds to support one of the organization's "work camps" in Tămășești. Moreover, in 1937, he defied the Romanian Government and held special religious services for the Iron Guard's leader Ion Moța and his fellow legionnaire Vasile Marin. The two had been killed in the Spanish Civil War fighting on the nationalist side. The same year, King Carol II began pressuring the Orthodox Church to depose Puiu. According to historian Ion Popa (historian), the king's actions were due to "Puiu's anti-Semitic, pro-Iron Guard, and pro-German policies". Metropolitan Visarion Puiu also maintained close ties with the National Christian Party through Constantin Tomescu, who served as Undersecretary of State for Religious Affairs and Arts in the Octavian Goga cabinet.

After campaigning against "foreign" banks, Puiu ended-up creating a new one altogether, named the Northern Bank, in 1938. The Romanianization of the metropolis' workforce, finance and business was practically complete at this time.

Apart from his Iron Guard connections, Puiu's time in the metropolitan seat of Bukovina was also marred by accusations of mismanagement and embezzlement, conflict with local academic and political elites and even the revolt of a part of the lower clergy.

On 10 February 1938, King Carol II suspended the Romanian constitution, banned all political parties and appointed Patriarch Miron Cristea, the head of the Romanian Orthodox Church, as Prime Minister. This was the beginning of the "Royal Dictatorship". In March 1939, Cristea died, leaving the Patriarchal seat vacant. Puiu publicly withdrew from the race for succession in June, likely under pressure from King Carol II. The monarch sought to avoid the election of a pro-German Patriarch in the person of either Puiu or Nicolae Bălan. In May 1940, Puiu was forced to resign from his position as Metropolitan of Bukovina. He was replaced by Tit Simedrea.

Meanwhile, Soviet leader Joseph Stalin had joined Nazi Germany's leader Adolf Hitler in the attack and partition of Poland, had occupied the Baltic states and defeated Finland in March 1940. This reinforced the position of the Romanian politicians who had been advocating for closer ties with Nazi Germany. Then, in June 1940, following a Soviet ultimatum, Romania ceded Bessarabia and Northern Bukovina to the Soviet Union without any kind of military resistance. King Carol II's acceptance of the Second Vienna Award, which ceded parts of Transylvania to Hungary, further weakened his regime and on 6 September 1940, Carol was forced to abdicate.

An openly pro-German coalition of the military, headed by marshal Ion Antonescu, and the Iron Guard took over. The head of the Romanian Orthodox Church, Patriarch Nicodim Munteanu, reacted cautiously and his September 1940 address was unenthusiastic. Puiu on the other hand benefited from the regime change as he was quickly reinstated as Metropolitan of Bukovina. According to Popa, this entails that Simedrea had not been properly seated as Metropolitan, or, at least, that was the pretext invoked by the Iron Guard to return Puiu to his old position.

The Legion's cooperation with Antonescu ended violently in January 1941. Indeed, seeking full control of the Government, the legionnaires organized an insurrection known as the Legionnaires' rebellion. However, the coup failed and in the aftermath, Puiu was once more replaced as Metropolitan of Bukovina by Simedrea.

Several hundred legionnaires, including Horia Sima and other leadership figures, managed to escape to Nazi Germany. Puiu would join this émigré Iron Guard community in the final stages of World War II.

== Exarch of Transnistria ==
Map of the Transnistria Governorate

On 22 June 1941, German armies with Romanian support attacked the Soviet Union. After initial military success, Romania regained control over Bessarabia and Northern Bukovina and, following an agreement between Antonescu and Hitler, also occupied the territory between the rivers Dniester and Bug. The name given to this province was Transnistria, and it would become the scene of mass murder. Under Antonescu's regime, 146,423 Jews from Bessarabia and Bukovina were deported to Transnistria, with at least 75,000 of them dying; 25,500 Roma were also deported there, of which 11,000 survived. Moreover, at least 130,000 local Ukrainian Jews were murdered under the Romanian occupation.

On 15 August 1941, under the assumption that the Soviet atheist rule had destroyed the Russian Orthodox Church in Transnistria, the Holy Synod of the Romanian Orthodox Church decided to establish a mission and "re-evangelize" the locals. The main architect of the enterprise was Archimandrite Iuliu Scriban. Antonescu's decree of 19 August 1941, which made the occupation of Transnistria official, explicitly stated that the churches which had been closed by the Soviets were to be re-opened and efforts were to be made to return the local population to its spiritual traditions. The Government pressured the Romanian Orthodox Church to extend its authority over the occupied territories and establish a regular bishopric. Initially, the Church resisted since the plan went against canon law, as the Russian Patriarchate still held nominal authority over the region.

In November 1942, Puiu was called back from retirement to take over Scriban's duties in Transnistria. (Note: The circumstances surrounding the event are particular. The summer of 1942 was marked by tension amidst the hierarchy of the Romanian Orthodox Church. Patriarch Nicodim retired to Neamț Monastery for several months and Nicolae Bălan acted as de facto head of the church. Puiu and Bălan had known disagreements. Surviving intelligence service reports show the situation was serious enough to alert Antonescu and the German Legation. Interestingly, after Puiu's nomination in November, the reports ceased.) Puiu received the official title of "Bishop of Odesa and all Transnistria", but his ecclesiastic province was, under canon law, a temporary exarchate of military nature. Nonetheless, he was once again a member of the Holy Synod. Furthermore, aside from Transnistria, he was also granted authority over the neighboring Metropolis of Bessarabia. (Note: The metropolitan seat of Bessarabia was vacant since 1936 when Gurie Grosu had been forced to retire. The Holy Synod only elected a successor in the person of Efrem Enăchescu in January 1944 shortly before Bessarabia was overrun by Soviet troops.) Puiu's plan for the exarchate included an evolution of Odesa into a metropolitan see, with two suffragan bishoprics in Balta and Tulchyn. This was partially successful since, indeed, Balta and Tulchyn were raised to bishopric status while Puiu was in office, but no bishop was ever appointed because of the Axis retreat. He also planned the reconstruction of the Transfiguration Cathedral in the style of the Romanian Revival architecture.

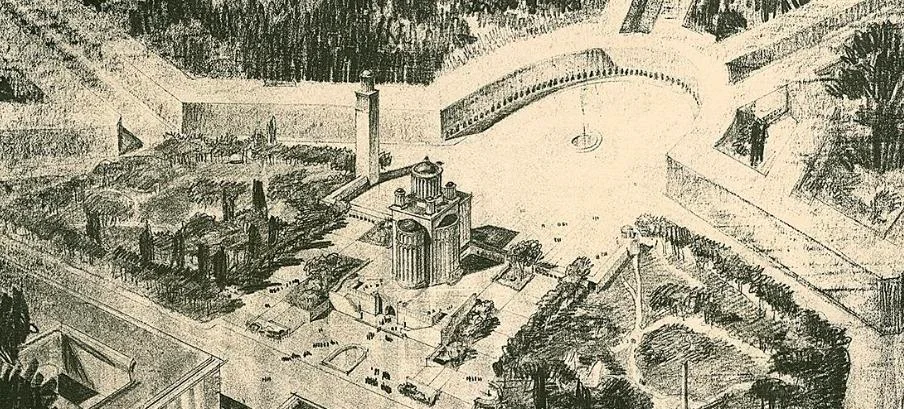
Metropolitan Visarion's plans for the reconstruction of the Odesa Cathedral

Before the end of 1942, Puiu sent a report from the occupied territories to the Holy Synod. He wrote:

"The conquest of a nation begins with weapons, continues with its assignment of administrators, to be completed later on with its complete conversion. The second important point of the mandate given to me in Transnistria was the systematization of social life, a necessary action requiring two immediate steps: an urgent, sometimes surgical one falling in the hands of the civil administration and the Army; and the other of constant spiritual renewal through the Orthodox Church and school."

The document would become evidence at Puiu's trial after the war.

The Romanian effort to restore Eastern Orthodox Christian life in the occupied territories was genuine. Under Soviet rule, by 1941, only 1 out of 891 churches which had been standing before the Russian Revolution was still open; 363 had been closed down, 269 partially demolished, 258 completely demolished and no functioning monasteries or convents remained. By the end of the Romanian occupation, 600 churches were operating (plus 135 "prayer houses"), as well as twelve monasteries and two seminaries. However, many churches and monasteries were rebuilt and refurbished employing Jews as slave labor. This had been enabled by Antonescu's Directive 23 of November 1941. Moreover, many of the missionaries were former affiliates of the Iron Guard seeking rehabilitation after the 1941 insurrection against Antonescu. Some came with a history of antisemitic violence. They vilified Jews in their sermons and, in some cases, some of them were perpetrators of various crimes committed against deported and local Jews.

As far as the non-Jewish local population was concerned, there was some enthusiasm for the Christian revival brought by the Romanians, at least in the first two years of the occupation, but the behavior of the Romanian clergy undermined the mission's credibility. Cases of embezzlement, corruption, extortion and various forms of abuse antagonized the local population to the point where officers of the Romanian Gendarmerie in Transnistria complained in writing, with one report reading "priests [...] manage to destroy what the Bolsheviks had failed to destroy, concerning faith in God. This is due to their engaging in illicit business transactions and committing actions which compromise the dignity of their office." The sexual conduct of the Romanian clergy was also a source of public outrage, and Puiu, pressured by both Government and Church authorities, was forced to issue stricter guidelines. Another source of resentment was the fact that ethnic Romanian priests were paid three times more than local ones.

There was an effort on Puiu's part to appeal to the local Orthodox population. Less radical in his approach to"Romanianization compared to his predecessor Scriban, he occasionally held religious services in Church Slavonic or gave sermons in Russian.

On 1 December 1943, Puiu sent a letter of resignation to Marshal Antonescu requesting that he be allowed to return to the Neamț Monastery. He argued that preparations were made for the evacuation of the province, that he had insufficient human and financial resources to run the mission and complained that he had waited six months to receive a printing press and was facing difficulties with the paper supply. The tide of the war was turning and, arguably, Puiu was being cautious. Between January and August 1944, he stayed at the Neamț Monastery, and then traveled to Bucharest.

== Exile ==
=== Voyage to Croatia and exile in Nazi Germany ===
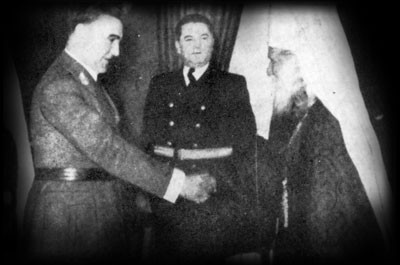
Poglavnik Ante Pavelić, minister Andrija Artuković and Patriarch Germogen Maximov (1942)

In August 1944, Patriarch Germogen Maximov of Croatia decided to place Spyridon Mifka on the episcopal seat of Sarajevo. Maximov's autocephalous Croatian Orthodox Church was a creation of the pro-Nazi Ustaše regime, and, by enthroning a bishop in Sarajevo, it sought to extend its influence over modern Bosnia and Herzegovina. Per canon law, the ceremony required a co-consecrator and the Romanian Orthodox Church ended up providing one in the person of Puiu. The fact that Romania and Croatia were both Axis countries at the time likely played an important part in the move. Puiu left Romania on 10 August, held a press conference in Zagreb on 14 August, paying his respects to Ustaše leader Ante Pavelić, and participated in the ceremony on 15 August. Maximov and Mifka would be executed after the war, but for Puiu, the timing of this voyage proved very fortunate. He was still abroad on 23 August when, following the 1944 Romanian coup d'état by King Michael I, Romania changed sides and joined the war against Nazi Germany. Puiu decided not to return to Romania and went into exile.

Meanwhile, the Nazis were setting up an Iron Guard-led Romanian government in exile. Constantin Papanace, a rival of Horia Sima, suggested General Ion Gheorghe as head of government, and, when the latter was discarded, Puiu. Sima, on the other hand, actively sought to undermine Puiu's candidacy. When the Nazis ultimately favored Sima, Ștefan Palaghiță and other legionnaires from the rival faction proposed the creation of an Eastern Orthodox episcopate headed by Puiu in Nazi Germany. The plan was opposed by Sima, who suggested that Puiu join his government instead. According to historian Paul A. Shapiro, Puiu initially accepted but then wavered and, finally, declined. Popa, however, citing intelligence service reports, argues that when Radio Donau finally aired the announcement about the creation of Horia Sima's government in exile in December 1944, Puiu was listed as a member. Popa's argument is based on the fact that the communists had not targeted Puiu for arrest until 14 December 1944, after the Radio Donau broadcast, when the clergyman's name appeared on a list designating him as Religious Secretary of the Iron Guard Government in exile.

Puiu's presence in the Kitzbuhel camp in Austria, in American custody, in May 1945, is documented. Chaplain (Colonel) Herbert E. MacCombie of the 36th Infantry Division reported on his encounter with the Romanian clergyman: "He (i. e., Puiu) told me that the Germans had been paying him several hundred marks a month, plus food and lodgings to support their cause. He asked what I thought the Americans would pay him to switch sides. Since he had not been much help to the Germans, I did not think the Americans would pay him anything. I arranged quarters and rations for him. He had his 'niece' with him. I arranged separate quarters for her." Colonel MacCombie's account is important because it proves Puiu had been receiving special treatment from the Nazi authorities along with other exiled legionnaires. The woman accompanying Puiu was, indeed, his niece.

Another notable clergyman involved with Sima's exiled legionnaires and connected to Puiu was priest Vasile Boldeanu. Boldeanu had joined the Iron Guard early, had held a number of mid- and upper-middle-level positions reaching the rank of legionary commandant at the time of the National Legionary State and had officiated during the religious service held at the exhumation of Codreanu's body in November 1940. Arrested after the rebellion, he had spent two years in prison before escaping to the German-occupied Serbian Banat. Involved in the legionary movement underground, he was arrested by the Nazi authorities in June 1944 and sent to join the other Iron Guard refugees. Both Puiu and Boldeanu would play a significant role in the Romanian Orthodox community in Paris after the war.

=== Exile in Italy and trial for war crimes ===
Puiu's whereabouts in the first years after the war are uncertain. While a document trail exists, it is hard to establish a chronology. His presence in Italy between 1945 and 1947 is confirmed, however his exact locations are subject to debate. Some sources cite the Maguzzano Monastery as Puiu's place of refuge, under the protection of Pope Pius XII and Cardinal Tisserant, but Puiu's surviving correspondence seems to indicate this was not a permanent place of residence.

Meanwhile, in Romania, the People's Tribunal were set up to prosecute perpetrators of the Holocaust, members of Antonescu's government and prominent legionnaires. Out of 2,700 defendants, only 668 were convicted. The others were released for lack of evidence. Furthermore, of those convicted, many would benefit from an amnesty in 1950. Prosecutors focused more on establishing links with the previous regime rather than thoroughly investigating genocide accusations. This was also true for the clergy involved in crimes committed in Transnistria. Thus, many Romanians came to see these trials as a result of Soviet occupation rather than as an attempt to carry out justice in matters of mass murder.

Tried by the People's Tribunal in Bucharest, Puiu was sentenced to death in absentia on 21 February 1946. Two charges were pressed against him: having "encouraged, from his position, the terror actions in Bessarabia and Transnistria" and having placed "himself in the service of Hitlerism, and selling off the country's interests by occupying the Religions' Secretary office, as it is made clear by a news dispatch broadcast by the German Radio Donau on 14 December 1944, at 0.30 a.m." The prosecution also mentioned another Radio Donau broadcast, dated New Year 1945, when Puiu allegedly incited Romanians to disobey Soviet orders. According to Popa, it was the second charge that the prosecution and the court focused on, the sentence designating Puiu as Bishop of the Romanian Orthodox Church in Germany by "a decree signed by Horia Sima, in his position as head of the traitor government in Germany". At no point do court documents mention the suffering of Jewish victims in Transnistria. Nonetheless, argues Popa, the prosecution was aware of the crimes committed during Puiu's tenure and seemed to imply that the Metropolitan's 1942 report was incriminating. (Note: Puiu's 1936 article, The Church Facing the Communist Danger, was never mentioned in court documents, possibly because the prosecution was unaware of its existence.)

The ambiguous wording of the Tribunal's sentence is, according to Popa, a source of confusion as to the exact reasons for which Puiu was convicted to death. The final paragraph in the original court document reads: "[c]onsidering that by the deeds mentioned above he committed the crime of bringing about the country's disaster, through committing the war crime outlined by Article No. 2, Letter J and punished by Article No. 3, Paragraph 11, from Law 312/1945; For these motives the People's Tribunal, in the name of the Law decides: It condemns the defendant, Romanian, adult, today disappeared, for the [war] (i. e., the word war is deleted in the original) crime of bringing about the country's disaster and by committing the war crime, consisting in the fact that he left the national territory, he put himself in the service of Hitlerism attacking the country through writing, through speech, as outlined by the articles mentioned above, we condemn him to death."

On 30 January 1947, Puiu sent a memoir to the Prime-president of the Romanian Court of Cassation addressing the charges for which he had been convicted. He claimed that he had been utterly unaware of any "actions of terror" committed in Transnistria during his tenure and furthermore stated that had he heard rumors of such actions, he would have informed the king. Puiu went on to comment on his 1942 report arguing that as a leading clergyman, he only focused on matters of the soul and peaceful activities, as opposed to other authorities. The latter, he argued, could carry-out police-style actions or even surgical actions against rebellious elements when required. (Note: In this case, Puiu's line of defense was, in Popa's opinion, careless. Puiu's wording implies, according to Popa, that he still believed, as late as 1947, the wartime propaganda which described "hundreds of thousands of Jews who were deported and killed in Transnistria as Bolsheviks, rebellious and enemies of the state" and supported the actions the Romanian state had taken against them.) Finally, Puiu outright denied any connection to the Iron Guard government in exile, despite all the compelling evidence, and requested an annulment of his sentence which would have allowed him to return to Romania.

=== Bishop of the Romanian Orthodox Diocese of Western Europe ===
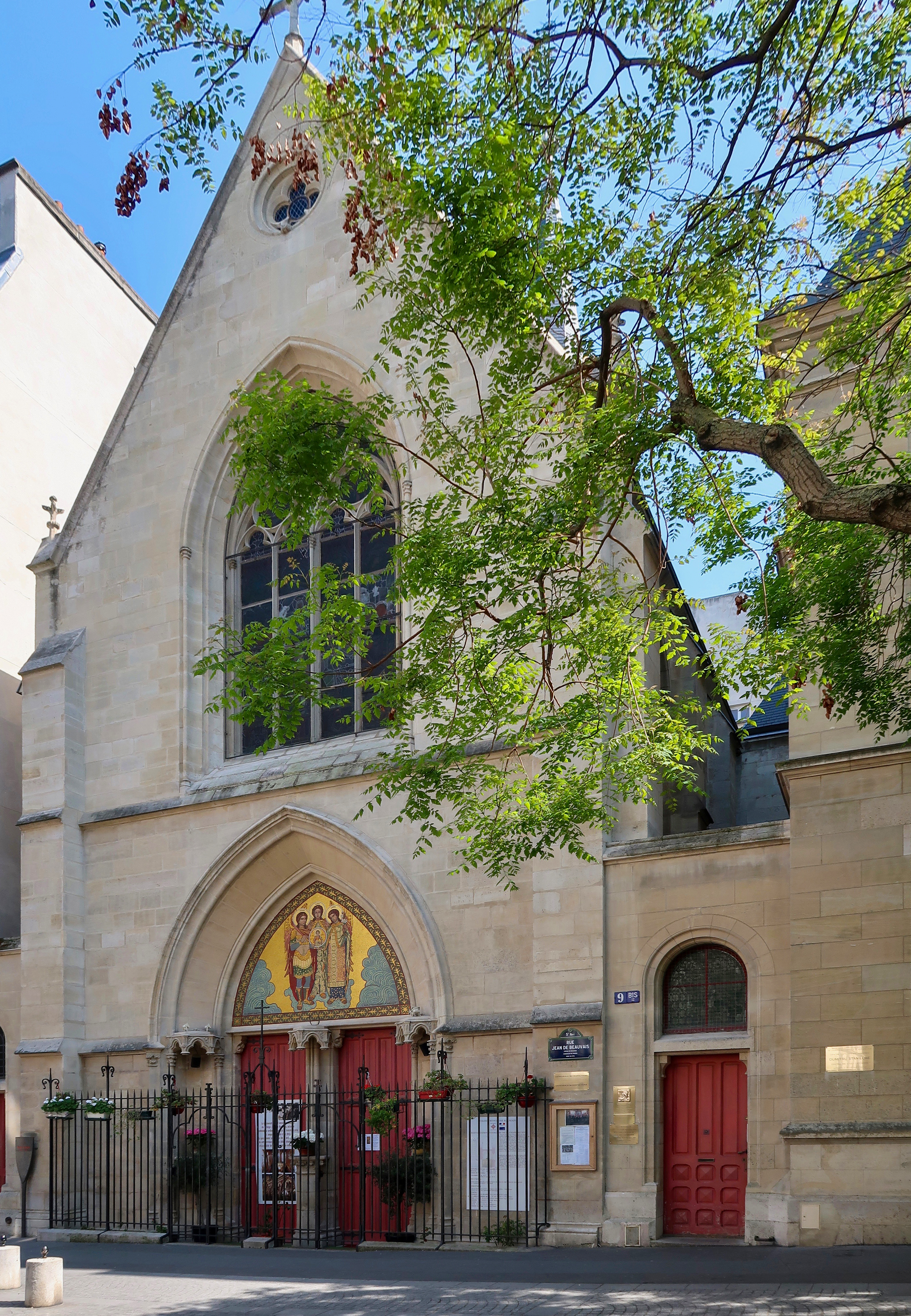
The Church of the Holy Archangels in Rue Jean de Beauvais, Paris

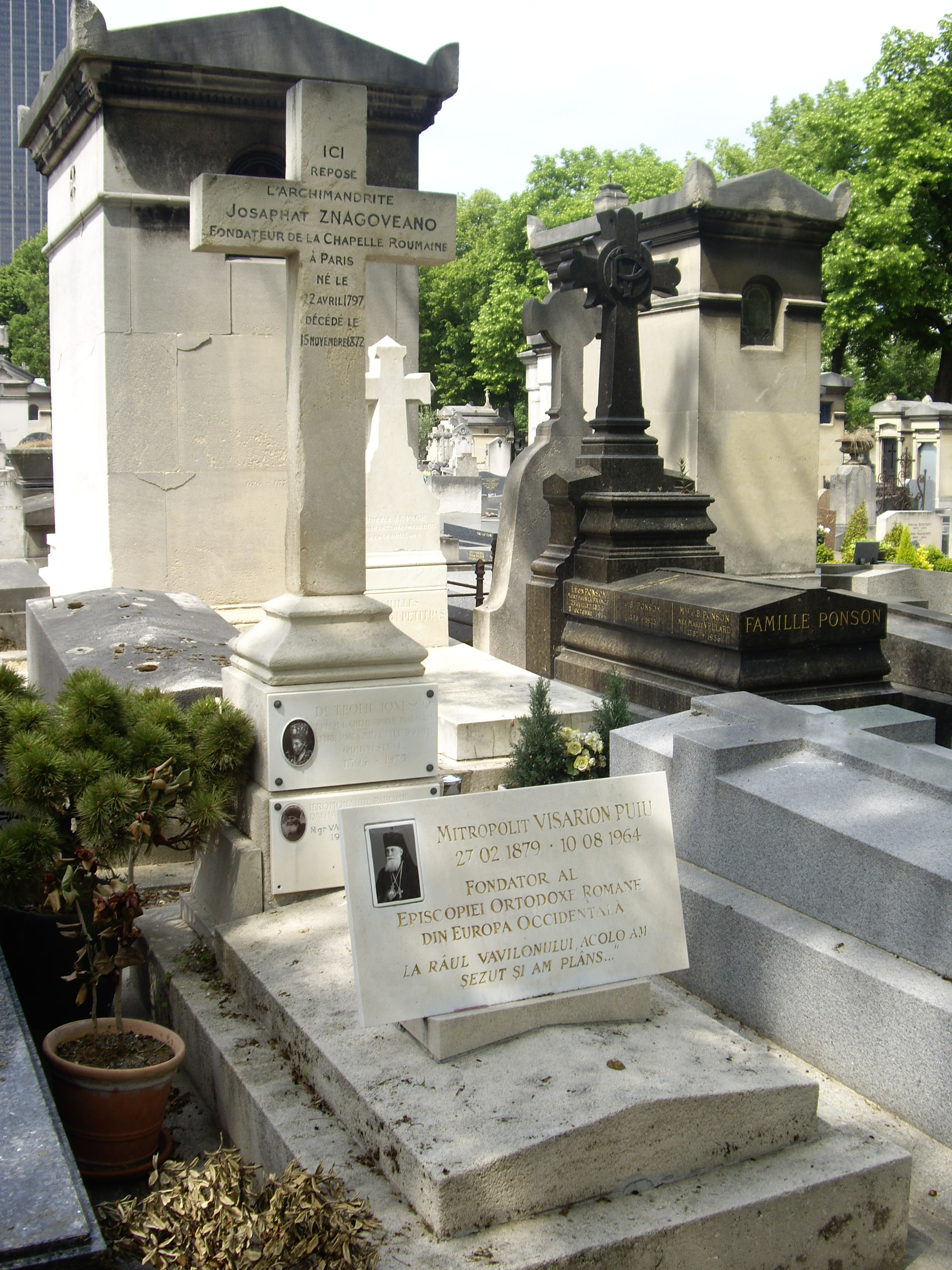
Puiu's tomb in Montparnasse Cemetery. The stone features a quote from Psalm 137: "By the rivers of Babylon we sat and wept".

By May 1948, Puiu had reached Switzerland and was trying to obtain identification allowing him to cross into France. The Intergovernmental Committee for Refugees initially issued a voyage document; then, becoming aware of the clergyman's problematic past, withdrew it before conceding to grant him some form of temporary ID that allowed him to leave Switzerland. Puiu crossed into France, and his immigration status there, at least until 1955, is unclear.

In 1948, the Eastern Orthodox Romanian figures in Paris chose to break communion with the Patriarchate in Bucharest and in the following year, Puiu created the Romanian Orthodox Diocese of Western Europe. In this new position, he put legionnaire priest Boldeanu in charge of the largest Parisian congregation. Sima, who had survived the war and remained the leader of a now exiled Iron Guard, recognized the importance of émigré Orthodox Church structures and re-established contact with Puiu in 1949. Other former Romanian politicians in exile, such as Nicolae Rădescu, also visited him in Paris at that time. Puiu behaved as a leader of the Romanian diaspora in Western Europe and embodied an element of resistance to the new Church hierarchy in Bucharest.

The period between 1949 and 1953 was marked by legal and canonical conflict over the Church of the Holy Archangels situated in Rue Jean de Beauvais in Paris. The forceful removal of superior Martinian Iovanovici in 1949 was due to his close relationship with the former king Carol II. The opposition to Iovanovici was led by Puiu's protégé, Boldeanu, who had gained the community's trust and would retain it over the years. The communist government in Bucharest failed to obtain legal control over the edifice, which, by 1953, was secured by the local association of worshipers. However, under Eastern Orthodox canon law, the situation of the parish was problematic. A long-term solution was finally found in 1954 when Puiu entered in communion with the Russian Orthodox Church Outside Russia (ROCOR) and the parish council officially recognized Puiu's authority on 11 April.

The Holy Synod of the Romanian Orthodox Church defrocked Puiu in 1950. The Holy Synod's decision, written by Metropolitan Bălan, labeled him "an agent of the Vatican" and was taken under pressure from the communist authorities. The latter felt threatened by Puiu in the context of a major crisis in the Romanian diaspora in the United States. The bishop of the Romanian Orthodox Episcopate of America, based in Detroit, Policarp Morușcă, had traveled to Bucharest in 1939 and had been unable to return to the United States because of the outbreak of World War II. Still in Romania in 1948, he was deposed by the new regime. The Holy Synod in Bucharest elected Andrei Moldovan to the vacant seat in 1950, but the local worshipers refused to accept him, favoring Valerian Trifa, a well known Iron Guard member, instead. Trifa had been involved in the 1941 rebellion and had also served for a time as Puiu's secretary during his exile. Declassified documents prove that Puiu had sent letters to both Moldovan and Trifa and the authorities in Bucharest were aware of the correspondence and thus of the danger the former Metropolitan's influence represented. By having him defrocked, they sought to limit that influence.

Paradoxically, in 1951, the Romanian secret service (the Securitate) began planning to reach out to Puiu in order to recruit him. The elaborate strategy involved making contact through Orthodox clergymen, blackmailing Puiu's brother and niece, using agents within the Church or members of the Holy Synod. On 20 August 1955, Puiu sent a letter to the Romanian Legation in Paris requesting repatriation. According to Popa, the possibility that this was Puiu's initiative, independent from the Securitate's plan, cannot be ruled out. Romania had just joined the United Nations and was taking steps to repatriate fugitives. However, Popa notes that things moved very fast. Terms were drafted by the Ministry of Internal Affairs as early as 29 August, with a Romanian agent paying a visit to Puiu's home on 26 October.

Negotiations between the clergyman and the Romanian authorities continued over the next months. According to an archive document dated November 1955, Puiu asked the communist leader, Gheorghe Gheorghiu-Dej, for the full restoration of his clerical rank and requested that he be named Metropolitan of Moldavia. The demands were so unreasonable that in 1956, the authorities concluded that Puiu was not genuinely interested in returning to Romania. By that time, his influence in the Romanian Orthodox diaspora in Paris had dwindled and the final years of his life were marked by poverty and isolation.

=== Final years and death ===
Teofil Ionescu succeeded Puiu in 1958 as Bishop of the Romanian Orthodox Diocese of Western Europe. In 1972, Ionescu would restore the communion with the Patriarchate in Bucharest, causing the main parish in Rue Saint Jean de Beauvais and most of the Romanian Orthodox worshipers in Paris to pass under the authority of the ROCOR metropolitan of New York.

There is evidence that in 1963, Puiu reached out one more time to the Romanian Embassy in Paris to negotiate repatriation. If so, no decisive steps were taken and Puiu died in France in 1964. Popa and Leustean indicate Paris as the place of death, but Orthodox priest and professor Mircea Păcurariu cites Viels-Maisons, west of Paris, where Puiu was first interred. His current resting place is in Montparnasse Cemetery.

== Posthumous evaluation ==
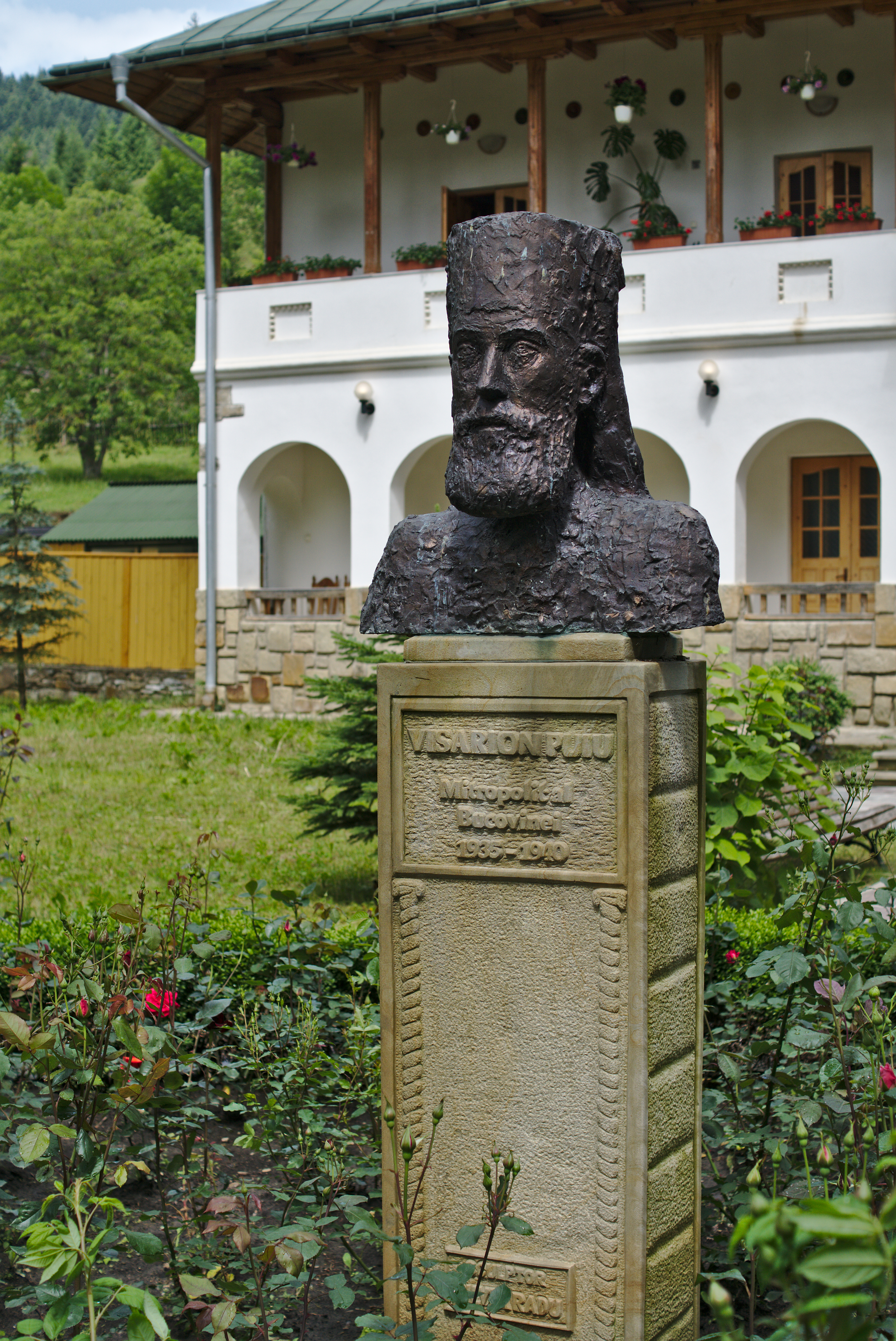
Bust of Puiu at Putna Monastery

In the aftermath of the Romanian Revolution of 1989, Orthodox circles began re-evaluating Puiu's legacy. On 25 September 1990, the Holy Synod of the Romanian Orthodox Church voted to reverse its 1950 decision to defrock Puiu and posthumously reinstated him among the clergy.

Over the following decades, Puiu's popularity grew, particularly in Romanian Moldavia, where, according to Ion Popa, it reached cult proportions with conferences and symposiums often organized to honor his memory. Articles printed in the national press often presented Puiu in a favorable light, and in 2003, a member of the Parliament of Romania publicly called for Puiu's body to be returned to Romania. His memory is particularly glorified by Orthodox groups with antisemitic views. Generally speaking, sources close to radical Orthodox groups portray Puiu as a hero, a martyr, a victim of King Carol II and, most often, a victim of communism.

Streets in Bălți, Moldova, and Ciohorăni, Romania, are named after him. As recently as 2021, the Romanian news outlet G4 Media reported that a bust of Puiu was on public display at Putna Monastery in violation of national legislation on convicted war criminals.

On February 27, 2024, several clerics of the Eparchy of Chernivtsi and Bukovina (Ukrainian Orthodox Church) gathered at the St. Nicholas Cathedral to pay tribute to Metropolitan Visarion Puiu of Bukovina on the 145th anniversary of his birth. The religious service was led by Bishop Nikita (Storozhuk) of Ivano-Frankivsk and Kolomyia, with the participation of Metropolitan Meletius (Egorenko) of Chernivtsi and Bukovina.

The question of Puiu's role in the crimes committed in Transnistria was addressed in Holocaust scholarship by Ion Popa and Ionuț Biliuță. The latter estimates that it was Puiu's duty as exarch to correctly inform the Patriarchate in Bucharest on the situation of the province and he deliberately failed to do so. Biliuță writes: "Puiu was aware that the "surgical" policies of the "civil administration and the Army" would have to precede this "spiritual renewal." Nevertheless, by ascribing — albeit implicitly — the killing of the Jews solely to state authorities Puiu's official correspondence veiled the participation of any of his clergy in murder and robbery. His silence protected not just friends such as Antim Nica, but others irrespective of any personal relationship. To this day official Church historiography leaves out the brutal behavior even of the Army, let alone the clergy, in Transnistria."

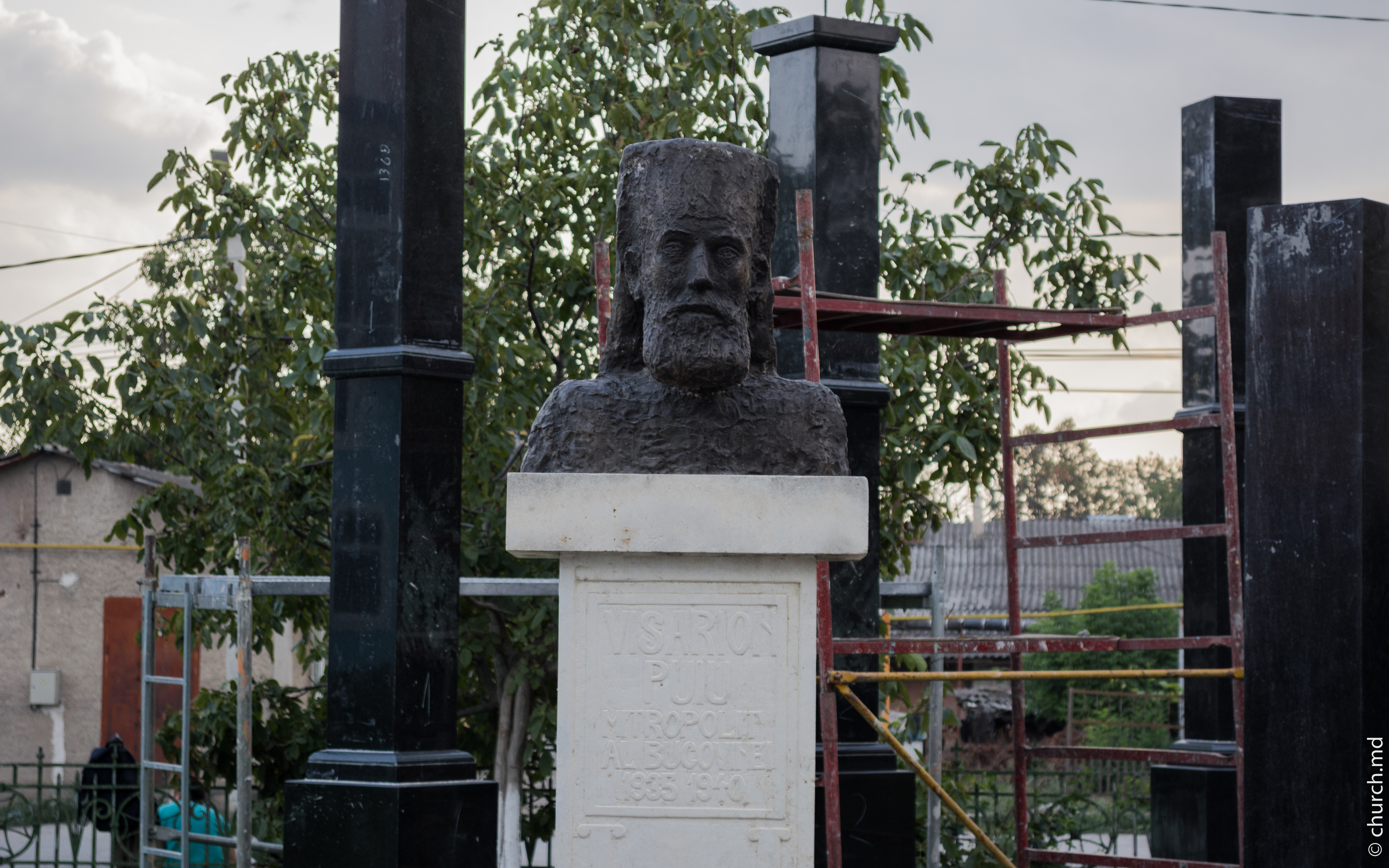
Bust of Visarion Puiu at the Sts. Constantine and Helen Cathedral, Bălți, Moldova

Popa argues that Puiu "supported German propaganda against Judeo-Bolshevism" and rejects the possibility that Puiu was unaware of the antisemitic crimes that were being committed on the territory of his exarchate. He notes that "in July 1943, in the middle of Visarion Puiu's mandate as Metropolitan of Transnistria, Jews (men, women, and children) were used as slave labourers, under the supervision of the Gendarmerie, for road works in preparation for the upcoming inauguration of the Balta cathedral. Most of them died of hunger and exhaustion, or were executed." and concludes that "he was not a victim of Communism in the way most recent writings try to portray him. Moreover, he was not a martyr of the Orthodox dignity, and even less so a saint. He had to be tried for his actions during the war. The trial and the sentence, although problematic, were a necessary step in analysing the attitude of the Romanian Orthodox hierarchs involved in the policies of hatred." Moreover, Popa judges that "it is a problematic fact that only Visarion Puiu was tried. Many other high hierarchs were involved in encouraging Ion Antonescu's policies." Antim Nica, for example, not only that he wasn't tried – he became bishop of Lower Danube, with the seat in Galați, in 1973, during the Communist rule, serving in this position until his death in 1994, 4 years after the Romanian Revolution of 1989.

== Bibliography ==
- Besse, Jean-Paul (1994). L'église orthodoxe roumaine de Paris, au coeur du quartier latin (in French). D.U.C. ISBN 978-2904092114.
- Besse, Jean-Paul (2006). "L'éphémère Eglise orthodoxe croate et son prolongement bosniaque". Balcanica (in French) (XXXVII): 265–271. doi:10.2298/BALC0637265B.
- Biliuță, Ionuț (2020). ""Christianizing" Transnistria: Romanian Orthodox Clergy as Beneficiaries, Perpetrators, and Rescuers during the Holocaust". Holocaust and Genocide Studies. 34 (1): 18–44. doi:10.1093/hgs/dcaa003.
- Clark, Roland (2012). "New models, new questions: historiographical approaches to the Romanian Holocaust". European Review of History: Revue européenne d'histoire. 19 (2): 303–320. doi:10.1080/13507486.2012.662946. S2CID 144324235.
- Clark, Roland (5 June 2015). Holy Legionary Youth Fascist Activism in Interwar Romania. Cornell University Press. ISBN 978-080145-633-6.
- Deletant, Dennis (2006). Hitler's Forgotten Ally: Ion Antonescu and His Regime, Romania 1940–44. Palgrave Macmillan. ISBN 978-140399-341-0.
- Ioanid, Radu (2022). The Holocaust in Romania : the destruction of Jews and Roma under the Antonescu regime, 1940-1944 (Second ed.). Rowman and Littlefield. ISBN 978-1-5381-3808-3.
- Leustean, Lucian N. (2009). Orthodoxy and the Cold War : religion and political power in Romania, 1947–65. Palgrave Macmillan. doi:10.1057/9780230594944. ISBN 978-1-349-30411-0.
- Pavel, Andreea (22 February 2021). "Cum încalcă legea autoritățile, minimalizând rolul criminalilor de război din România anilor '40 / Lista străzilor, instituțiilor și monumentelor din țară care încă poartă numele Ion Antonescu, Mircea Vulcănescu, Radu Gyr ș.a." G4 Media (in Romanian).
- Păcurariu, Mircea (2002). Dicționarul teologilor români (Ediția doua, revizuită și întregită ed.). Editura Enciclopedică. ISBN 973-45-0409-6.
- Popa, Ion (2013). "Visarion Puiu, the Former Romanian Orthodox Metropolitan (Archbishop) of Transnistria — A Historical Study on His Life and Activity". Holocaust. Study and Research (6): 182–203.
- Popa, Ion (11 September 2017). The Romanian Orthodox Church and the Holocaust (Kindle ed.). Indiana University Press. ISBN 978-0-253-02989-8.
- Roman, Mihai (13 August 2021). "16 situații în care legea este încălcată: Lista străzilor cu nume de criminali de război condamnați / Unde mai sunt amplasate busturi ale acestora în România". G4 Media (in Romanian).
- Shapiro, Paul A. (2007). "Chapter 7: Faith, Murder, Resurrection. The Iron Guard and The Romanian Orthodox Church". In Spicer, Kevin P. (ed.). Antisemitism, Christian Ambivalence, and the Holocaust. Indiana University Press. pp. 136–170. ISBN 978-0-253-34873-9.
- Solonari, Vladimir (2016). "Nationalist Utopianism, Orientalist Imagination, and Economic Exploitation: RomanianAims and Policies in Transnistria, 1941–1944". Slavic Review. 75 (3): 583–605. doi:10.5612/slavicreview.75.3.0583. S2CID 164575062.
- Solonari, Vladimir (2019). A satellite empire: Romanian rule in southwestern Ukraine, 1941–1944. Cornell University Press. ISBN 978-1-5017-4319-1.
- Birsan, Gabriel (17 September 2019). "La métropole orthodoxe roumaine d'Europe occidentale et méridionale". In Zwilling, Anne-Laure (ed.). Les minorités religieuses en France (in French). Bayard. pp. 463–477. ISBN 978-2-227-49485-5.
