= G4 Media =

G4 Media may refer to:

- G4 Media (TV company), a Los Angeles–based American TV company
- G4 Media (website), a Romanian news website
