= Romanian Orthodox Mission in Transnistria =

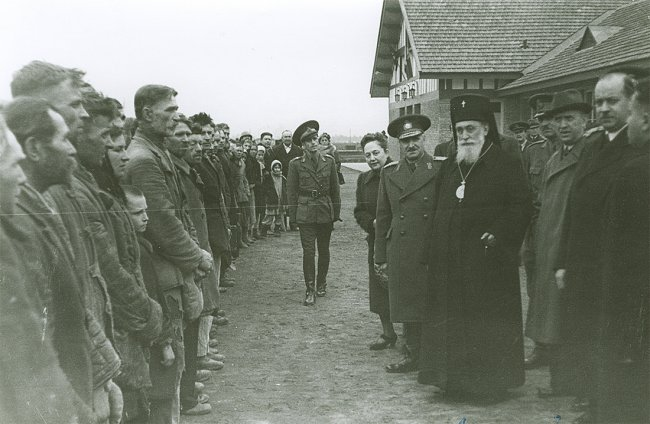

The Romanian Orthodox Mission in Transnistria was established in the context of Romania's participation in the invasion of the Soviet Union as an ally of Nazi Germany. On 22 June 1941, German armies with Romanian support attacked the Soviet Union. German and Romanian units conquered Bessarabia, Odesa, and Sevastopol, then marched eastward across the Russian steppes toward Stalingrad. On 15 August 1941, the Holy Synod established a mission in Transnistria, the Romanian-occupied part of the Soviet Union. The assumption was that Soviet atheist rule had destroyed the Russian Orthodox Church and the Romanian Orthodox Church took it upon itself to "re-evangelize" the locals.

== Creation of the mission ==
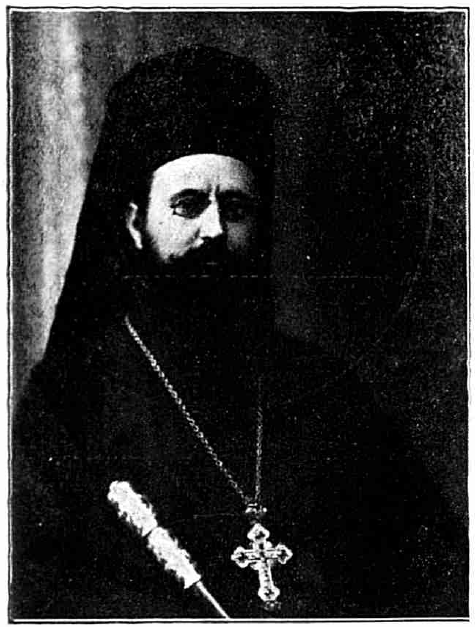
Iuliu Scriban in 1910

The main architect of the enterprise was Archimandrite Iuliu Scriban. Antonescu's decree of 19 August 1941, which made the occupation of Transnistria official, explicitly stated that the churches that had been closed by the Soviets were to be re-opened and efforts were to be made to return the local population to its spiritual traditions. The Government pressured the Romanian Orthodox Church to extend its authority over the occupied territories and establish a regular bishopric. Initially, the Church resisted since the plan went against canon law - the Russian Patriarchate still held nominal authority over the region.

== Evolution to exarchate ==
The aging Iuliu Scriban found it difficult to manage the mission and in 1942 he was replaced by Visarion Puiu. In November 1942 Puiu was called back from retirement to take over Scriban's duties in Transnistria. (Note: The circumstances surrounding the event are particular. The summer of 1942 was marked by tension amidst the hierarchy of the Romanian Orthodox Church. Patriarch Nicodim retired to Neamț Monastery for several months and Nicolae Bălan acted as de facto head of the church. Puiu and Bălan had known disagreements. Surviving intelligence service reports show the situation was serious enough to alert Antonescu and the German Legation. Interestingly, after Puiu's nomination in November, the reports ceased.) Puiu received the official title of "Bishop of Odesa and all Transnistria" but his ecclesiastic province was, under canon law, a temporary exarchate of military nature. Nonetheless, he was once again a member of the Holy Synod. Furthermore, aside from Transnistria, he was also granted authority over the neighboring Metropolis of Bessarabia. (Note: The metropolitan seat of Bessarabia was vacant since 1936 when Gurie Grosu had been forced to retire. The Holy Synod only elected a successor in the person of Efrem Enăchescu in January 1944 shortly before Bessarabia was overrun by Soviet troops.) Puiu's plan for the exarchate included an evolution of Odesa into a metropolitan see, with two suffragan bishoprics in Balta and Tulchyn. This was partially successful since, indeed, Balta and Tulchyn were raised to bishopric status while Puiu was in office but no bishop was ever appointed because of the Axis retreat.

Before the end of 1942 Puiu sent a report from the occupied territories to the Holy Synod of the Romanian Orthodox Church. He wrote:

"The conquest of a nation begins with weapons, continues with its assignment of administrators, to be completed later on with its complete conversion. The second important point of the mandate given to me in Transnistria was the systematization of social life, a necessary action requiring two immediate steps: an urgent, sometimes surgical one falling in the hands of the civil administration and the Army; and the other of constant spiritual renewal through the Orthodox Church and school."

The document would become evidence at Puiu's trial after the war.

== Restoration of Eastern Orthodox practice ==
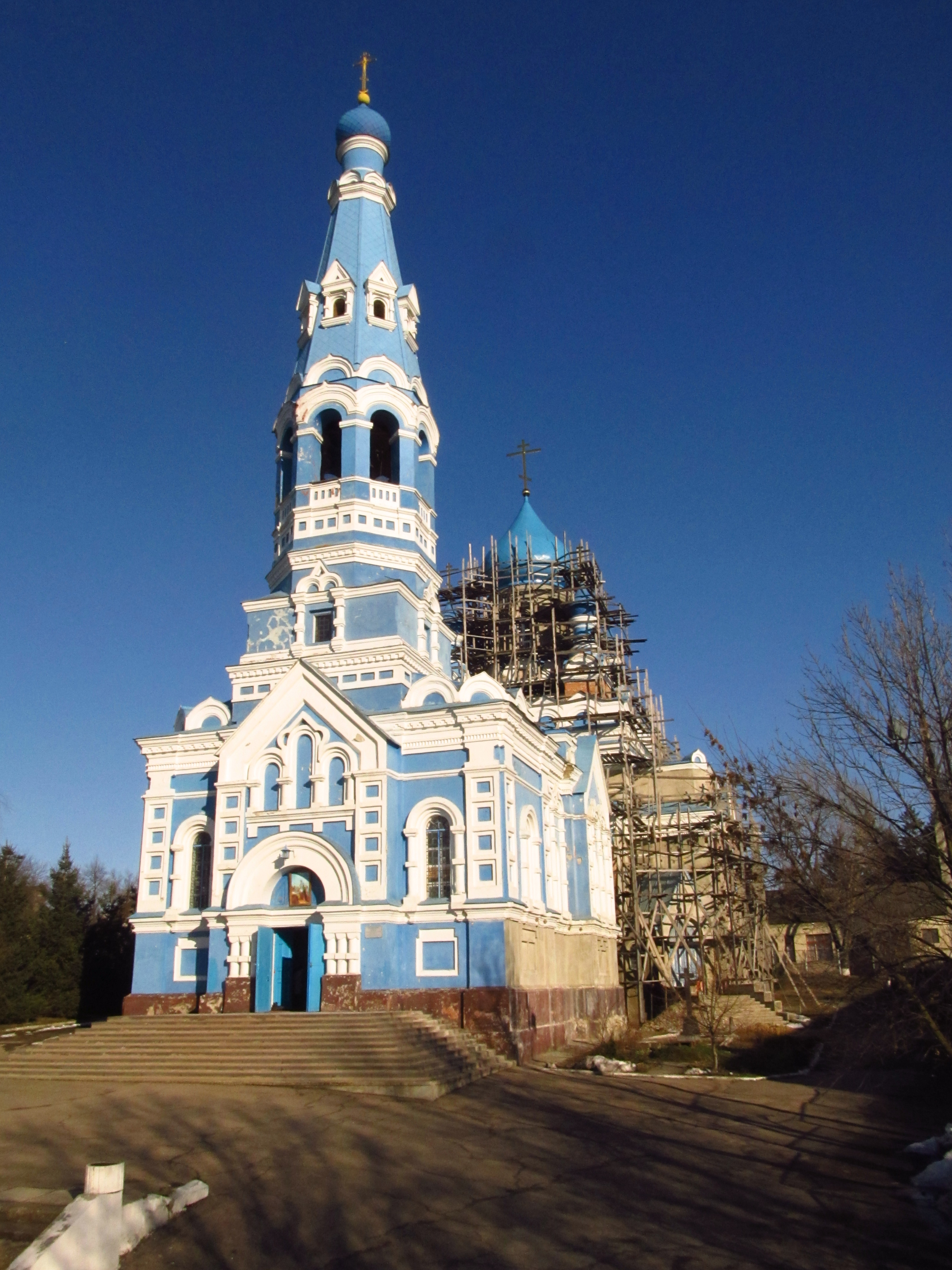
Cathedral in Balta

The Romanians' effort to restore Orthodox Christian life in the occupied territories was genuine. Under Soviet rule, by 1941, only 1 out of 891 churches which had been standing before the Russian Revolution was still open; 363 had been closed down, 269 partially demolished, 258 completely demolished and no functioning monasteries or convents remained. By the end of the Romanian occupation 600 churches were operating (plus 135 "prayer houses") as well as twelve monasteries and two seminaries. On the other hand, many of the missionaries were former affiliates of the Iron Guard, some were seeking rehabilitation after the 1941 insurrection. Abuse against the Jewish population but also against the local Orthodox Christians was widespread and numerous reports of Orthodox priests partaking and profiting from the abuse exist. In fact, so shocking was the behavior of the missionaries that officers of the Romanian Gendarmerie occupation forces complained in writing with one report reading "priests [...] manage to destroy what the Bolsheviks had failed to destroy, concerning faith in God. This is due to their engaging in illicit business transactions and committing actions which compromise the dignity of their office."

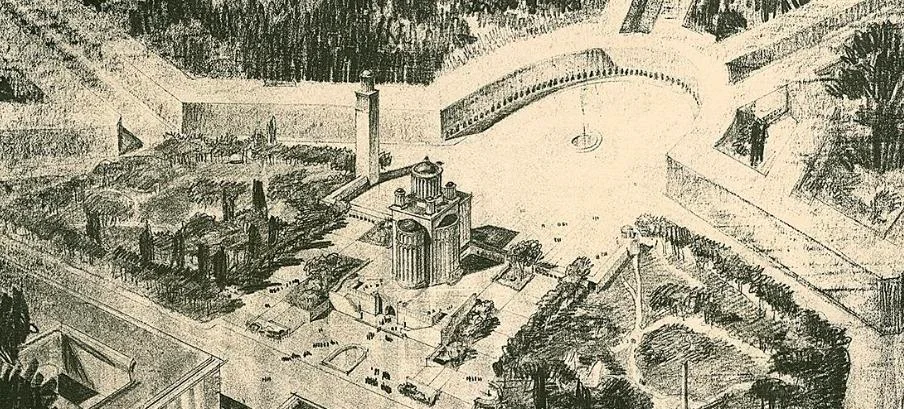
Metropolitan Visarion's plans for the reconstruction of the Odesa Cathedral

== Role in the Holocaust ==
=== Perpetrators, bystanders and beneficiaries ===
According to historian Ion Popa, during the occupation of Transnistria, Puiu was involved in spreading antisemitic propaganda on the ground, particularly propagating the Judeo-Bolshevik theses, but unlike other Orthodox clergymen such as Metropolitan Irineu Mihălcescu of Moldova, Metropolitan Bălan of Transylvania, or Archbishop Nicolae of Oradea, tended to avoid the public expression of antisemitism.

Biliuță argues that Puiu implicitly placed the responsibility for the murder of Jews with the secular authorities while failing to report the participation of his clergy in the violence and robbery thus protecting his friends, such as Antim Nica as well as his subordinates in general. Furthermore, for Ionuț Biliuță, Puiu and the other Romanian clergymen in Transnistria behaved "as feudal lords exploiting their Jewish and Ukrainian serfs". Ion Popa also cites the 1942 report and notes that it constituted evidence in Puiu's trial for war crimes with prosecutors arguing the Metropolitan encouraged "terror actions". Popa also notes that Jewish men, women and children were used as slave labor for the inauguration of the cathedral in Balta during Puiu's tenure in Transnistria.

Historian Vladimir Solonari, while agreeing that "[a]ccusations of corruption, abuse of power, and embezzlement abounded and tarnished the mission's reputation", brings some nuance in his assessment of Puiu and of the Romanian mission. He points out that, comparatively, the population in Transnistria enjoyed a more favorable religious situation than that of the German-occupied Reichskommissariat Ukraine and that there was some enthusiasm for the Christian revival brought by the Romanians, at least in the first two years of the occupation. He also notes that Puiu was a less radical supporter of Romanianization than his predecessor Scriban, occasionally holding religious services in Church Slavonic or giving sermons in Russian. Nonetheless, Solonari argues, Puiu had not abandoned the principles of Romanianization despite his behavior being more flexible and tactful. Romanian clergymen, for instance, were paid three times more than local ones which caused resentment.

Paulin Lecca, a Romanian clergyman who served in the Romanian mission left an autobiography, mostly focused on his time in Transnistria. Lecca, a Bessarabian fluent in Russian, documented the abuse committed by his fellow missionaries. In a particularly shocking scene, Lecca reports his conversation with a hieromonk named Gurie who advised him to rape Jewish women, probably from a nearby ghetto, in order avoid becoming sick from abstinence. When Lecca protested, arguing that such acts were sinful, Gurie responded that the women were not baptized, thus a simple prayer to the Holy Virgin would grant absolution. Overall, the sexual conduct of the Romanian clergy was scandalous to a point where, pressured by both Government and Church authorities, Puiu was forced to issue stricter guidelines.

In December 1943 Visarion Puiu resigned as Metropolitan of Transnistria. In his resignation letter he cited reasons such as shortage of resources and insufficient missionary priests, but it is reasonable to believe that with the tide of the War turning, Puiu was merely being cautious. Between January and August 1944 he stayed at Neamț Monastery, then in Bucharest.

=== Saviors ===
Priest Gheorghe Petre was recognized as Righteous Among the Nations for having saved Jews in Kryve Ozero. Petre was arrested in 1943 and court-martialed but was released in 1944 for lack of evidence.

Pastor Richard Wurmbrand, himself a Jew, wrote the following in his book Christ on the Jewish Road (Cristos pe ulița evreiască, p. 43): "I will never forget Archimandrite Scriban, who during the most violent anti-Semitic persecutions was ready to help us day and night, intervening on our behalf on countless occasions. This man, who had been the rector of the Theological Institute and whose former students were now priests in Bucharest, would rebuke those in leadership at the Ministry of Culture whenever they made our lives difficult and called us 'kikes' (jidani). He would ask them: 'Is this what I taught you? Was Jesus not also a kike? And was the Mother of God not also a kike?'"

== Bibliography ==
- Besse, Jean-Paul (2006). "L'éphémère Eglise orthodoxe croate et son prolongement bosniaque". Balcanica (in French) (XXXVII): 265–271. doi:10.2298/BALC0637265B.
- Biliuță, Ionuț (2020). ""Christianizing" Transnistria: Romanian Orthodox Clergy as Beneficiaries, Perpetrators, and Rescuers during the Holocaust". Holocaust and Genocide Studies. 34 (1): 18–44. doi:10.1093/hgs/dcaa003.
- Clark, Roland (2012). "New models, new questions: historiographical approaches to the Romanian Holocaust". European Review of History: Revue européenne d'histoire. 19 (2): 303–320. doi:10.1080/13507486.2012.662946. S2CID 144324235.
- Clark, Roland (5 June 2015). Holy Legionary Youth Fascist Activism in Interwar Romania. Cornell University Press. ISBN 978-080145-633-6.
- Deletant, Dennis (2006). Hitler's Forgotten Ally: Ion Antonescu and His Regime, Romania 1940–44. Palgrave Macmillan. ISBN 978-140399-341-0.
- Păcurariu, Mircea (2002). Dicționarul teologilor români (Ediția doua, revizuită și întregită ed.). Editura Enciclopedică. ISBN 973-45-0409-6.
- Popa, Ion (2013). "Visarion Puiu, the Former Romanian Orthodox Metropolitan (Archbishop) of Transnistria — A Historical Study on His Life and Activity". Holocaust. Study and Research (6): 182–203.
- Popa, Ion (11 September 2017). The Romanian Orthodox Church and the Holocaust (Kindle ed.). Indiana University Press. ISBN 978-0-253-02989-8.
- Shapiro, Paul A. (2007). "Chapter 7: Faith, Murder, Resurrection. The Iron Guard and The Romanian Orthodox Church". In Spicer, Kevin P. (ed.). Antisemitism, Christian Ambivalence, and the Holocaust. Indiana University Press. pp. 136–170. ISBN 978-0-253-34873-9.
- Solonari, Vladimir (2019). A satellite empire: Romanian rule in southwestern Ukraine, 1941–1944. Cornell University Press. ISBN 9781501743191.
- Birsan, Gabriel (17 September 2019). "La métropole orthodoxe roumaine d'Europe occidentale et méridionale". In Zwilling, Anne-Laure (ed.). Les minorités religieuses en France (in French). Bayard. pp. 463–477. ISBN 9782227494855.
