= Romanian Orthodox Metropolis of Western and Southern Europe =

Autonomous metropolis of the Romanian Orthodox Church

The Romanian Orthodox Metropolis of Western and Southern Europe is an autonomous metropolis of the Romanian Orthodox Church centered in Paris. It has its origins in the Romanian Orthodox Diocese of Western Europe created by Visarion Puiu. The Metropolis consists of five dioceses:

- Diocese of Western Europe, based in Paris;
- Diocese of Great Britain and Northern Ireland, based in London;
- Dioceses of Italy, based in Rome;
- Diocese of Spain and Portugal, based in Madrid; and
- Diocese of Ireland and Iceland, based in Dublin.

== Bibliography ==
- Clark, Roland (5 June 2015). Holy Legionary Youth Fascist Activism in Interwar Romania. Cornell University Press. ISBN 978-080145-633-6.
- Popa, Ion (2013). "Visarion Puiu, the Former Romanian Orthodox Metropolitan (Archbishop) of Transnistria — A Historical Study on His Life and Activity". Holocaust. Study and Research (6): 182–203.
- Shapiro, Paul A. (2007). "Chapter 7: Faith, Murder, Resurrection. The Iron Guard and The Romanian Orthodox Church". In Spicer, Kevin P. (ed.). Antisemitism, Christian Ambivalence, and the Holocaust. Indiana University Press. pp. 136–170. ISBN 978-0-253-34873-9.
- Birsan, Gabriel (17 September 2019). "La métropole orthodoxe roumaine d'Europe occidentale et méridionale". In Zwilling, Anne-Laure (ed.). Les minorités religieuses en France (in French). Bayard. pp. 463–477. ISBN 9782227494855.
