= Romanian Orthodox Archdiocese of Great Britain and Northern Ireland =

Romanian Orthodox archdiocese in the United Kingdom

Archdiocese of Romanian Orthodox Archdiocese of Great Britain and Northern Ireland
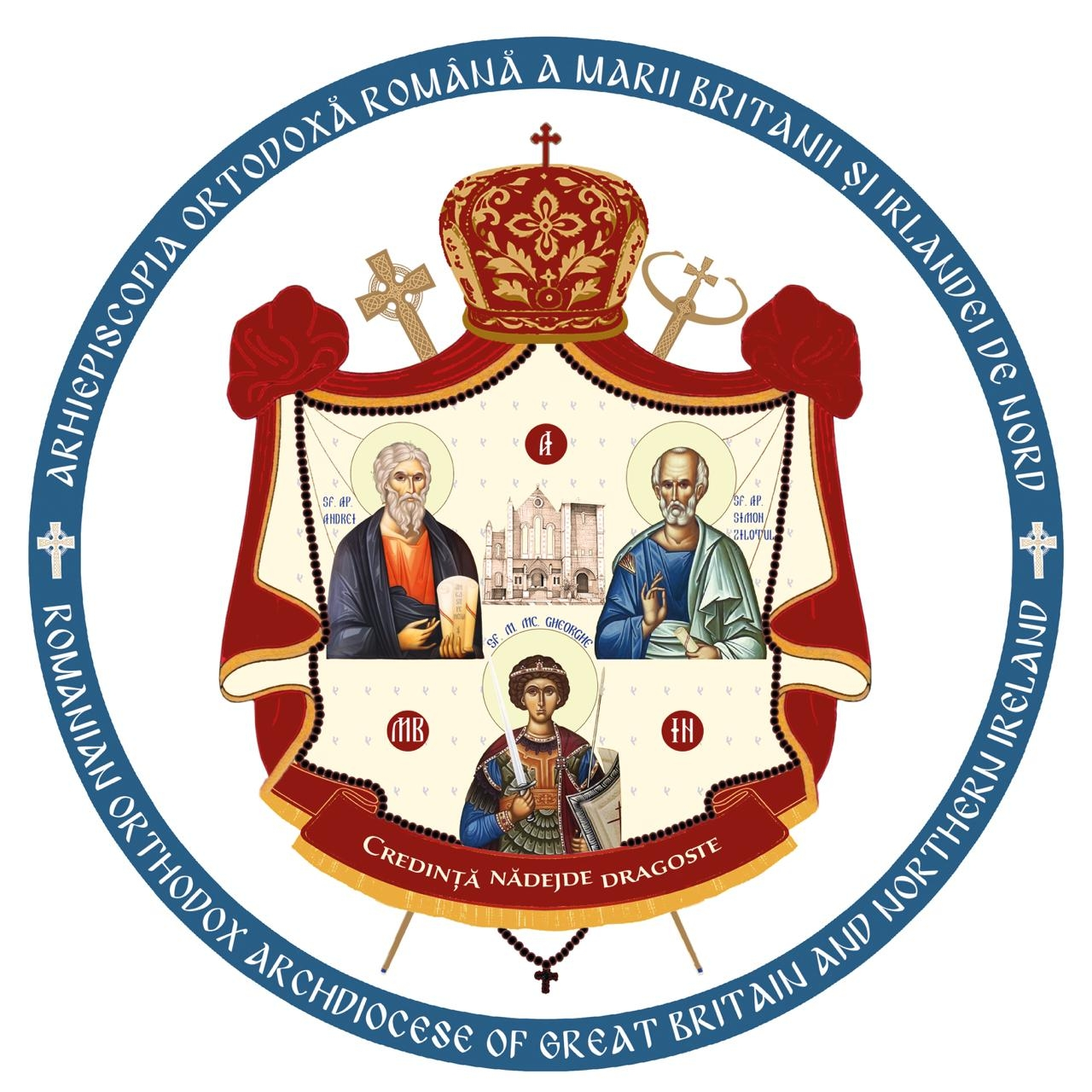
- Coat of arms

Location
- Country: United Kingdom
- Territory: Great Britain and Northern Ireland
- Metropolitan: Romanian Orthodox Metropolis of Western and Southern Europe
- Headquarters: Enfield, London, England

Information
- Denomination: Romanian Orthodox Church
- Sui iuris church: Eastern Orthodox Church
- Rite: Byzantine Rite
- Established: 2024 (as a diocese); elevated to archdiocese in 2024
- Cathedral: St George the Great Martyr Archdiocesan Cathedral (Enfield)

Current leadership
- Parent church: Romanian Orthodox Church
- Bishop: Atanasie (Rusnac)

Website
- roarch.org.uk

The Romanian Orthodox Archdiocese of Great Britain and Northern Ireland is an ecclesiastical jurisdiction of the Romanian Orthodox Church serving Romanian Orthodox communities in the United Kingdom. It forms part of the Romanian Orthodox Metropolis of Western and Southern Europe.

The archdiocese is headquartered in Enfield, London, and is led by Archbishop Atanasie (Rusnac).

== History ==
In February 2024, the Holy Synod of the Romanian Orthodox Church approved the establishment of a Romanian Orthodox diocese for Great Britain and Northern Ireland as part of a broader reorganization of ecclesiastical jurisdictions serving Romanian Orthodox communities in Western Europe.

The decision reflected the size and pastoral needs of the Romanian Orthodox diaspora in the United Kingdom, one of the largest Romanian communities outside Romania.

On 12 July 2024, the diocese was elevated to the rank of archdiocese and placed under the jurisdiction of the Romanian Orthodox Metropolis of Western and Southern Europe.

On 25 October 2024, the Holy Synod elected Bishop Atanasie of Bogdania as the first Archbishop of Great Britain and Northern Ireland. His enthronement took place on 10 May 2025 at the archdiocesan cathedral in Enfield, London.

== Organization ==
The archdiocese oversees Romanian Orthodox parishes and missions throughout England, Scotland, Wales, and Northern Ireland. Its administrative and pastoral activity is coordinated through archdiocesan offices based in Enfield, London.

== Cathedral ==
The archdiocesan seat is the St George the Great Martyr Archdiocesan Cathedral in Enfield, London, which serves as the principal place of worship and administrative center of the archdiocese.

== Leadership ==
Archbishop Atanasie (Rusnac), born Tudor Rusnac on 17 January 1982 in Chișinău, Republic of Moldova, was ordained to the episcopate in 2018 and previously served as an auxiliary bishop of the Romanian Orthodox Diocese of Italy prior to his election as archbishop in 2024.

== See also ==
- Romanian Orthodox Church
- Romanian Orthodox Metropolis of Western and Southern Europe
- Eastern Orthodoxy in the United Kingdom
