= Transfiguration Cathedral, Odesa =

Church in Odesa, Ukraine

Transfiguration Cathedral
- Спасо-Преображенський кафедральний собор
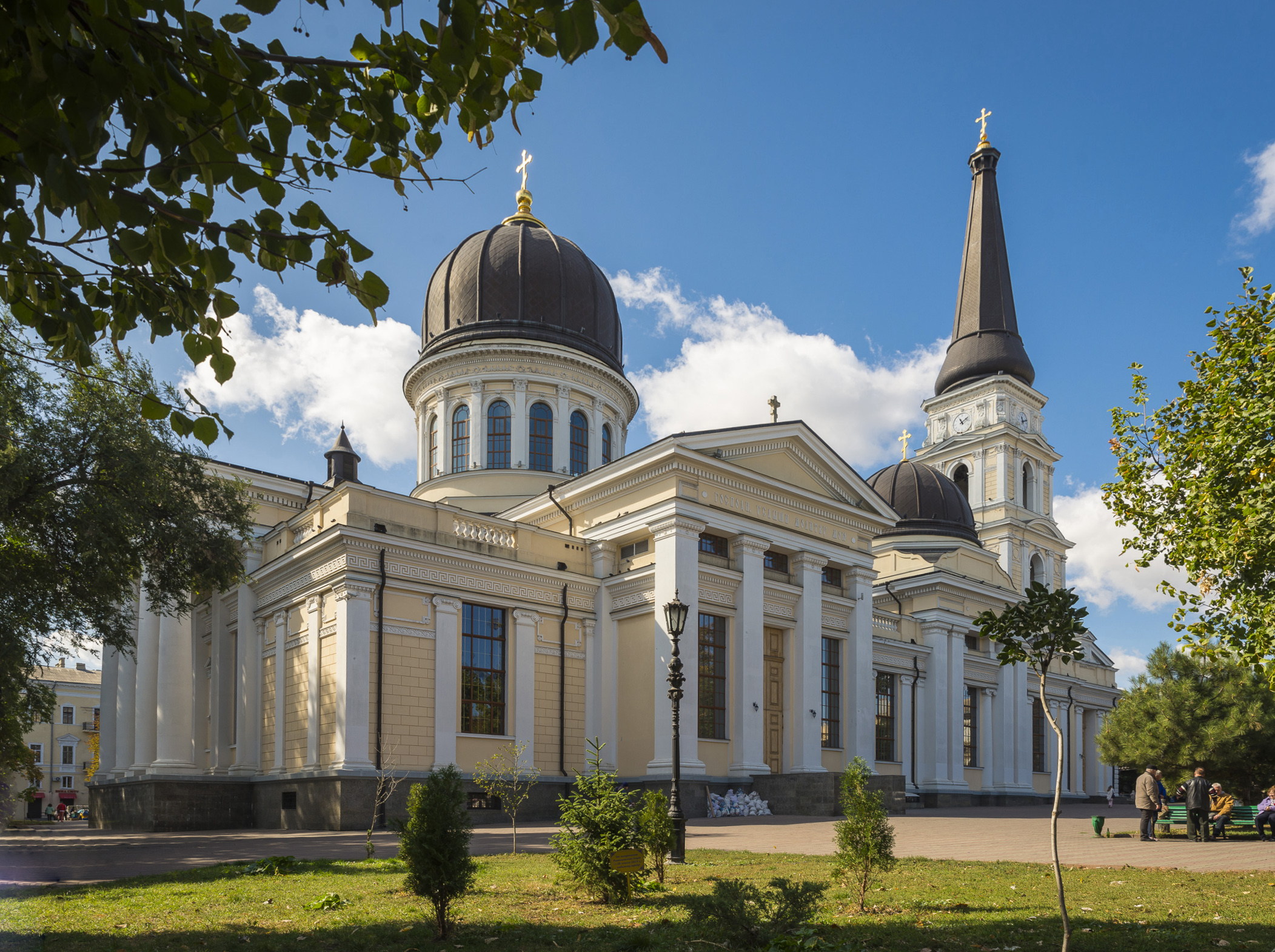
- Transfiguration Cathedral
- 46°28′59.44″N 30°43′51.75″E
- Location: Soborna Square 3, Odesa
- Country: Ukraine
- Denomination: Eastern Orthodox
- Website: Sobor.odessa.ua

History
- Dedication: Transfiguration of Jesus

Architecture
- Architect: V.Vonrezant
- Style: Neoclassicism
- Groundbreaking: 1795
- Completed: 1808 (original), 2005 (reconstruction)
- Demolished: 1936

Specifications
- Capacity: 9,000 (main); 3,000 (underground)
- Length: 90.6 m
- Width: 46.6 m
- Height: 77 m (top cross bell tower)

Administration
- Division: Moscow Patriarchate

Immovable Monument of Local Significance of Ukraine
- Official name: Будівля Спасо-Преображенського собору, де поховано видатних людей м. Одеси й Південного регіону України – князя Воронцова М.С. та княгиню Воронцову Є.К. (Building of the Saviour-Transfiguration Cathedral, where prominent people of Odesa and the southern region of Ukraine, prince M. S. Vorontsov and princess Y. K. Vorontsova, are buried)
- Type: History
- Reference no.: 35-Од

The Transfiguration Cathedral (Ukrainian: Спасо-Преображенський собор) is the Orthodox Cathedral in Odesa, Ukraine, dedicated to the Transfiguration of Jesus and belongs to the Ukrainian Orthodox Church (Moscow Patriarchate).

== History ==
The first and foremost church in the city of Odesa, the cathedral was founded in 1794 by Gavril Bănulescu-Bodoni. The construction started on November 14, 1795 following the project by Vikentiy Vanrezant, with the church originally dedicated to Saint Nicholas. Construction lagged several years behind schedule and the newly appointed governor of New Russia, Armand-Emmanuel de Vignerot du Plessis, Duc de Richelieu, employed the Italian architect Francesco Frappoli in 1798 to complete the edifice.

The church was designated as a cathedral in 1800. Three of its altars were consecrated in 1808, when the church was renamed to the Transfiguration Cathedral. It was continuously expanded throughout the 19th century. The belltower was built between 1827 and 1837 (architects Francesco Frappoli and Giorgio Torricelli), and the refectory connecting it to the main church was constructed in 1842. The interior was lined with real and artificial marble, and the iconostasis also was made of marble. Minor additions were made to the building until 1903, when it reached its final form.

Several churches in the region, including the Nativity Cathedral in Chişinău, were built in conscious imitation of the Odesa church. The cathedral was the burial place of the bishops of Tauride, including Saint Innocent of Kherson, and Prince Mikhail Semyonovich Vorontsov, the famous governor of New Russia.

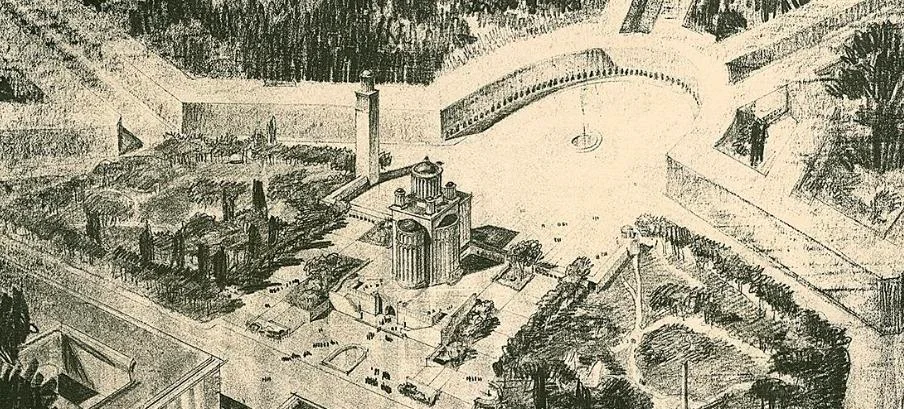
Romanian plans for the reconstruction of the Odesa Cathedral

The original structure was demolished by the Soviets in 1936. There were plans for the reconstruction of the Cathedral during the Romanian occupation of Ukraine during WW2, in the style of the Romanian Revival architecture, at the initiative of Metropolitan Visarion Puiu; however, they never materialized. The cathedral's foundation was excavated in 1996, a few years after the Declaration of Independence of Ukraine. From August to September 1999, a competition for the best reconstruction project was held by the local government, resulting in the implementation of the project by V. Meshcheriakov, A. Martynenko, and Institute "Ukrproektrestavratsiia". The reconstruction started in 2000, and the cathedral was opened on May 22, 2005. The remains of Prince Vorontsov and his wife were reburied in the cathedral on November 10, 2005. There is a statue of him on the cathedral square, though its monumental status was scrapped on November 11, 2023 in order to comply with the 2023 derussification law. On July 21, 2010, the cathedral was consecrated by Patriarch Kirill of Moscow.

In January 2023, the cathedral was inscribed on the World Heritage List as part of the Historic Centre of Odesa and immediately listed as in danger due to the Russo-Ukrainian war. On July 23, 2023, the cathedral was severely damaged by a Russian missile attack. UNESCO strongly condemned repeated attacks by Russia on the Historic Centre of Odesa. The cathedral was restored with support from the Italian government and UNESCO, with the bulk of the restoration works completed by October 2024 and the heating system restored by December 2025.

== Description ==
The Transfiguration Cathedral is a dominant structure of Odesa's cityscape. It was originally cross-shaped and one-domed, with a four-tiered bell tower. Although most of the building follows the neoclassicist style, some of the dome features are eclecticist. Currently, the cathedral is a two-storey building, housing a winter church on the ground level and a summer church above. A chapel is located in the bottom of the bell tower. The cathedral bells are controlled by an electronic device capable of playing 99 melodies.

== Gallery ==
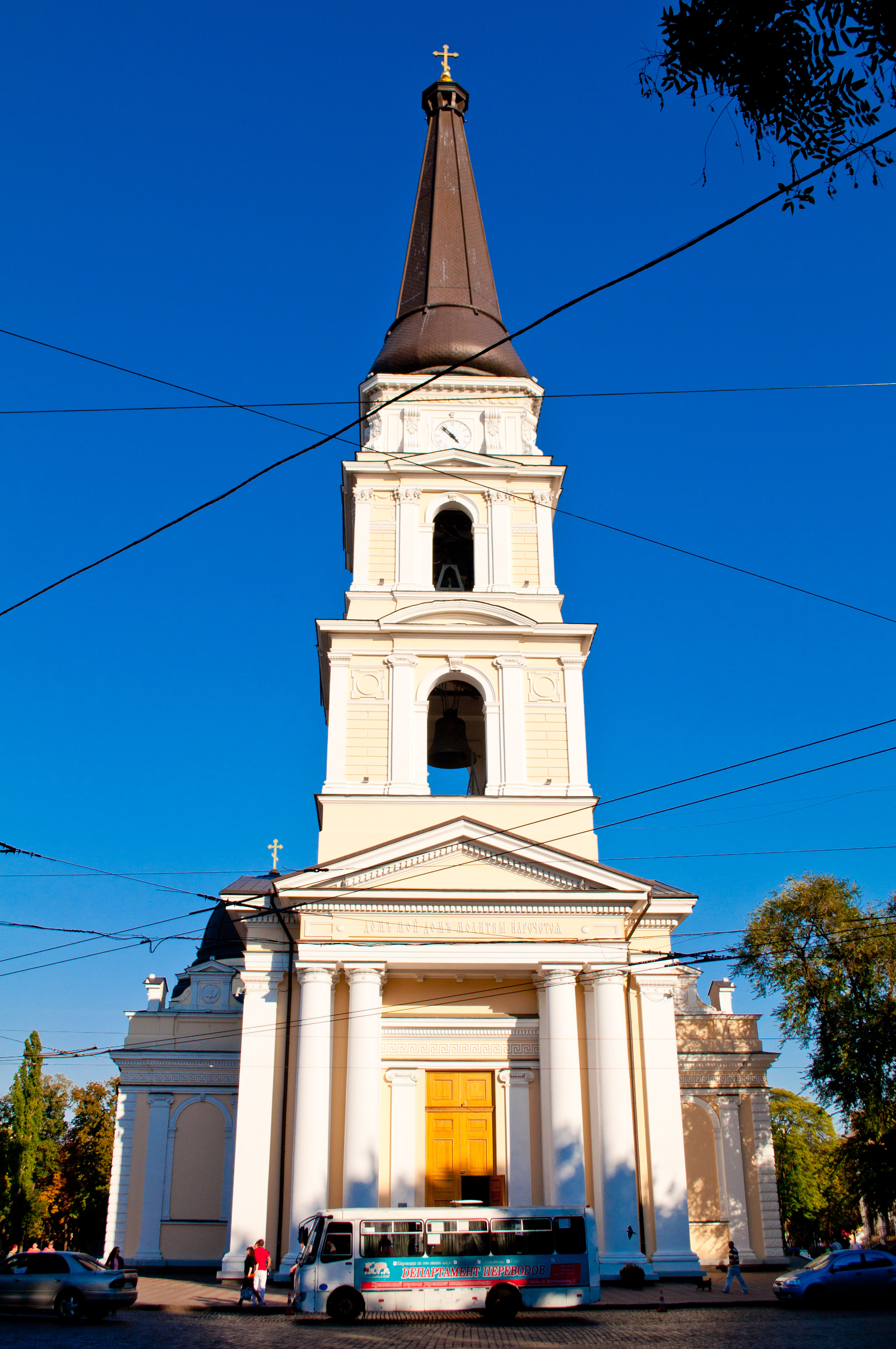
The belltower and the main entrance

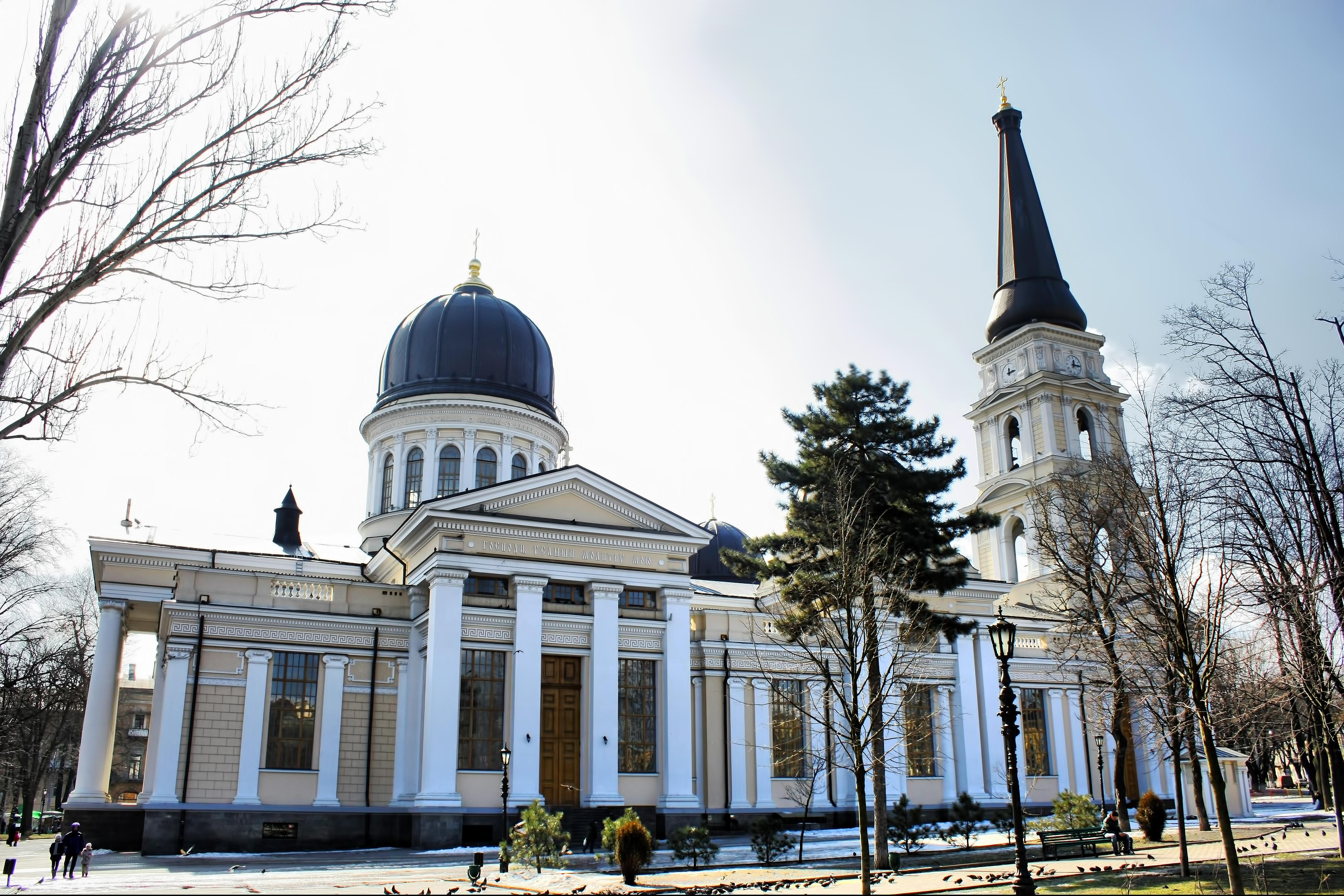
Overall view

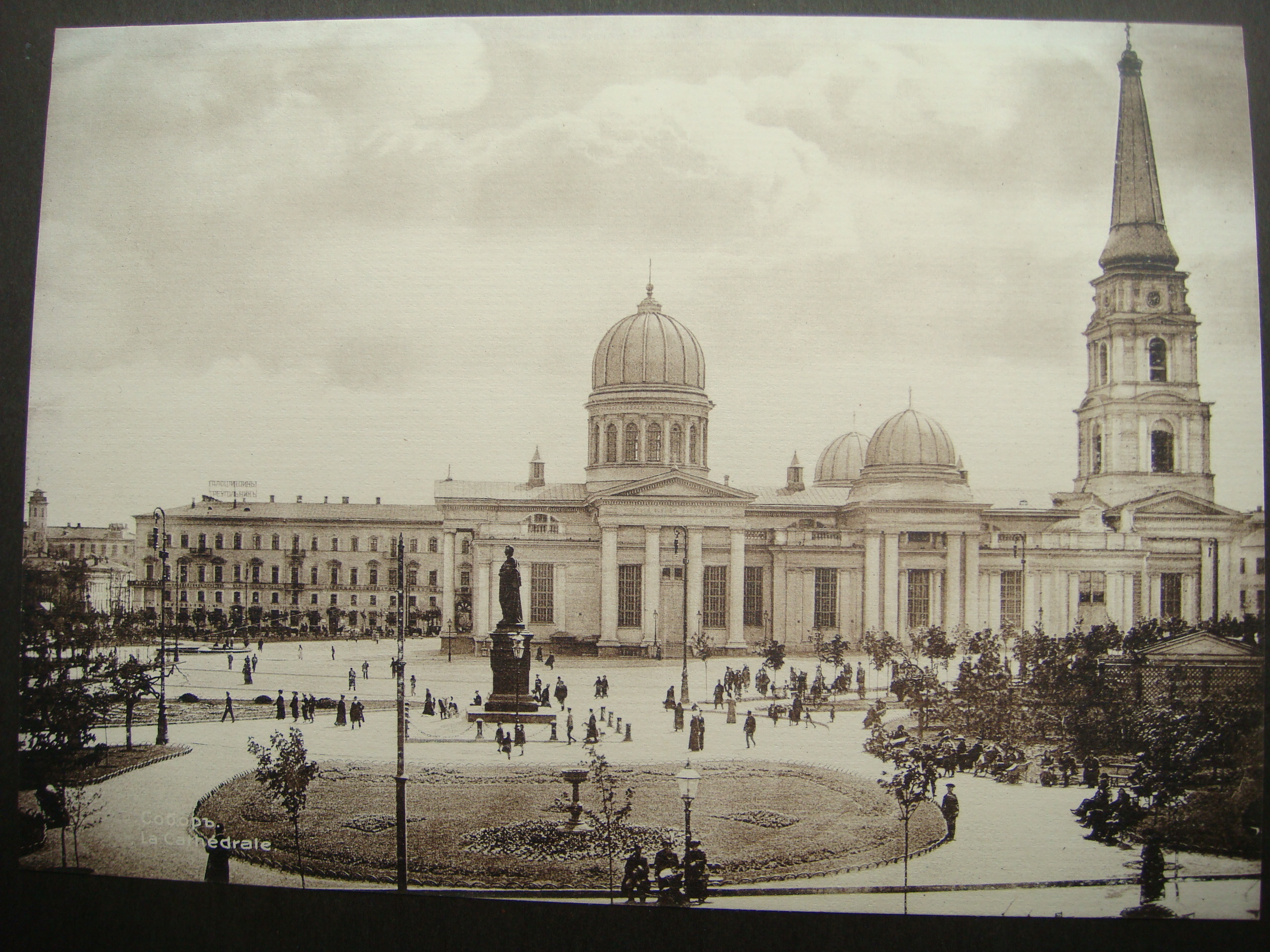
The Cathedral Square in the early 20th century

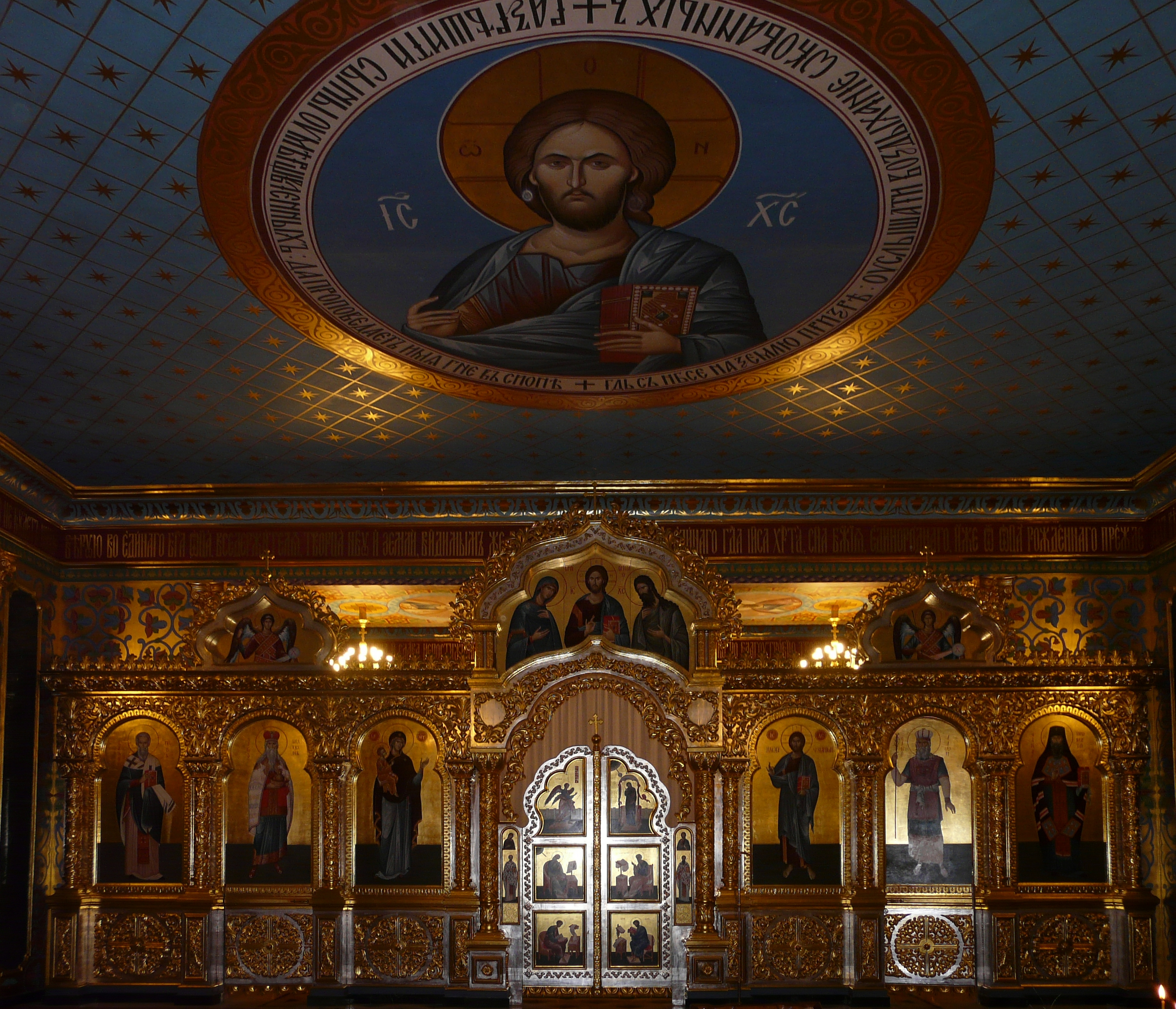
The iconostasis in a side chapel

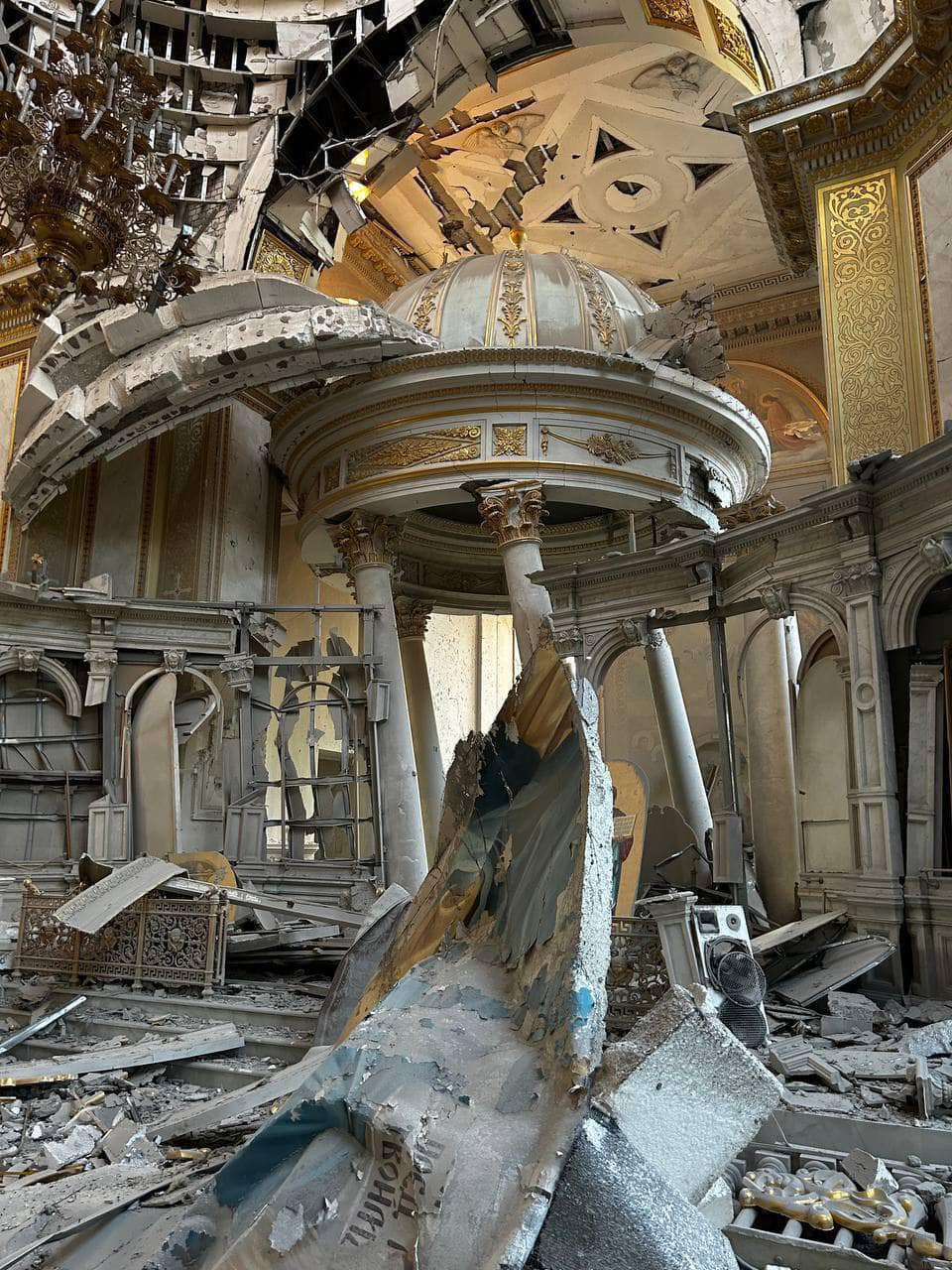
Interior of the cathedral after the missile attack

Wall painting in the partially destroyed cathedral

== See also ==
- List of largest Eastern Orthodox church buildings
