= G4 Media (website) =

Romanian news website

- Website type: Online newspaper
- Available in: Romanian
- Headquarters: {{{location_country}}}
- Area served: Worldwide
- Founders: Dan Tăpălagă and Cristi Pantazi
- Website: g4media.ro
- Commercial: Yes
- Launched: 18 March 2018; 8 years ago
- Current status: Active

G4 Media is a Romanian news website. It was launched on 18 March 2018 by Romanian journalists Dan Tăpălagă and Cristi Pantazi. G4 Media was the most cited news website and the fifth most cited media outlet in general in Romania during the month of June 2023.
