= Freemasonry in Romania =

Freemasonry in Romania traces its origins to the 18th century. Following an intricate history, all organised Freemasonry in the country ceased during the Communist era, although some lodges continued to operate in exile overseas. Freemasonry returned to Romania in the 1990s.

== History ==
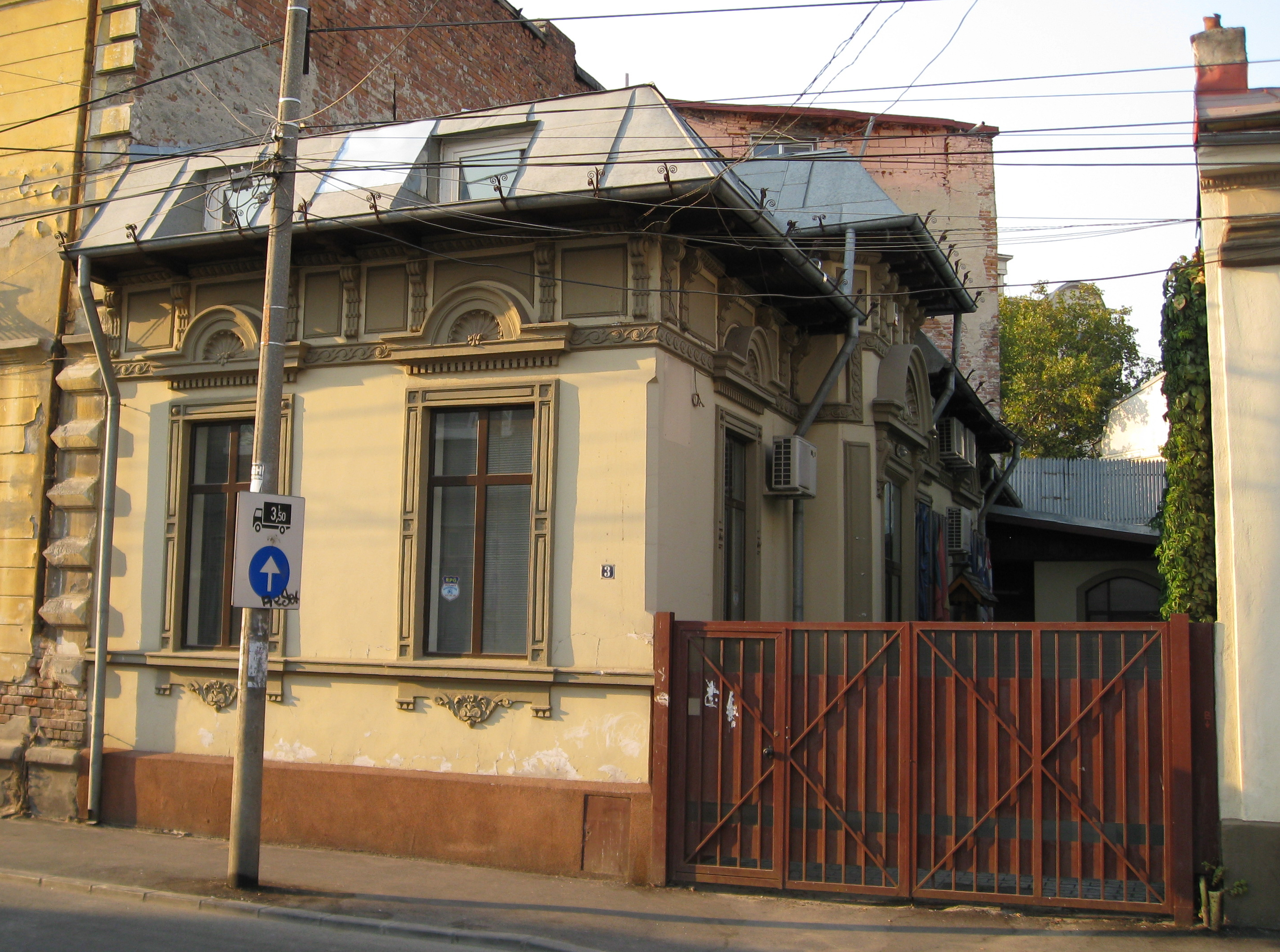
Headquarters of the National Grand Lodge of Romania (MLNaR), in Bucharest

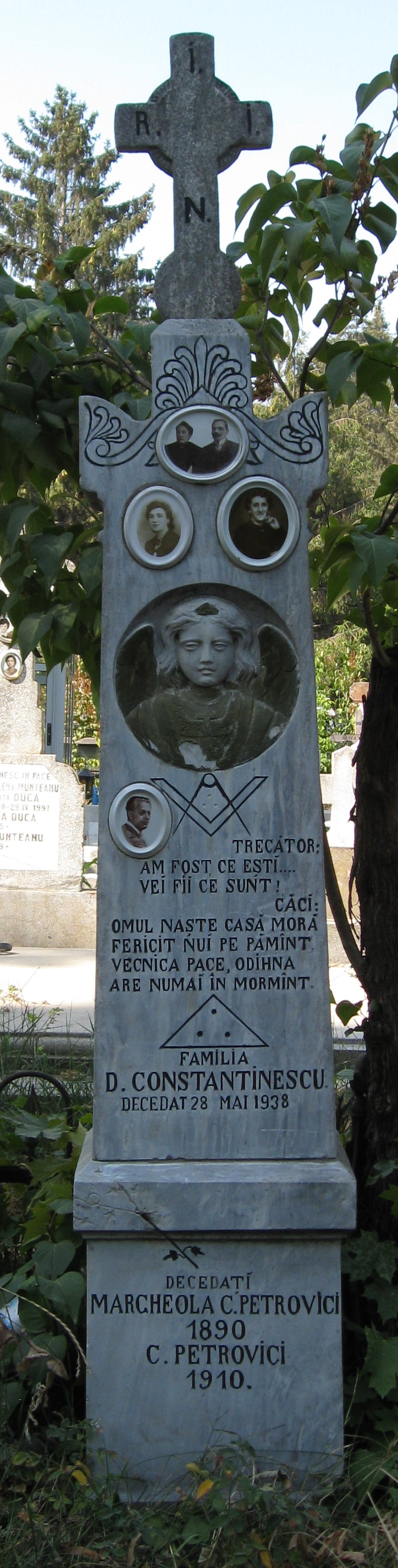
Grave featuring Masonic imagery in Ghencea cemetery

The beginnings of Freemasonry in the Danubian Principalities of Moldavia and Wallachia (which would unite to form Romania in 1859) date to the 18th century and the activities of the humanist scholar Anton Maria del Chiaro, secretary to voivodes Constantin Brâncoveanu (ruled Wallachia 1688-1714) and Constantine Mavrocordatos (alternately ruled both domains between 1730 and 1769). In 1734 or 1737, del Chiaro founded the first Masonic Lodge in the Principalities at Galați. Shortly thereafter, Mavrocordat founded a lodge at Iaşi while ruler of Moldavia. During the same period in Transylvania, known Freemasons included László and János Kemény, Count Gabriel Bethlen and Baron Samuel von Brukenthal. In 1753 lodges were set up at Braşov (Kronstadt), Sibiu (Hermannstadt) and at the military garrisons of Sfântu Gheorghe (Sepsiszentgyörgy) and Miercurea Ciuc (Csíkszereda). On 23 February 1783 Horea, who led a peasant revolt the following year, gave a Romanian-language speech at the True Understanding Lodge in Vienna, in which he used a series of Masonic symbols (it is highly likely that he was initiated). In 1795, by imperial decree, Masonic activity was outlawed in the Habsburg empire, including Transylvania. In Wallachia, the first lodge was very likely established by Jean Louis Carra, secretary to voivode Grigore III Ghica (October 1768-November 1769).

In advance of the Wallachian Revolution of 1848, a Freemason-inspired secret society known as Frăția ("The Brotherhood") was set up. Ion Ghica, Nicolae Bălcescu, Christian Tell, Dimitrie Bolintineanu, Cezar Bolliac, Constantin Daniel Rosenthal, C. A. Rosetti, Dimitrie and Ion Brătianu, Alexandru G. Golescu and others belonged to Frăția and were at the forefront of the revolution. Freemasons such as Vasile Alecsandri, Mihail Kogălniceanu and Alexandru Ioan Cuza were active in the revolution in Moldavia that year. The union of Moldavia and Wallachia in 1859 featured involvement by Freemasons from the Principalities and from exile. Cuza, domnitor of the new polity, governed on Masonic principles but nevertheless came into conflict with certain prominent boyars, who, like him, belonged to the Steaua Dunării Lodge in Bucharest. These individuals, dissatisfied with Cuza's actions, organised a plot to dethrone him, but when this was uncovered in 1865, the prince shut down the Lodge without taking measures against the plotters. Thus Cuza dissolved his own Lodge on the pretext that its establishment in nine years earlier had not been officially approved. Not coincidentally, the three officers who presented Cuza with his act of abdication the following year were Freemasons. The Junimea literary society, connected with Steaua Dunării and publishing journals such as Gazeta de Iași (1867), Convorbiri literare (1867), Gazeta literară (1871) and Constituțiunea (1886), played an important cultural role.

Romania's Lodges were unified on 8/20 September 1880, when the National Lodge was founded with Constantin Moroiu as Grand Master. Conflict ensued between the National Lodge and certain Moldavian Lodges, as the former indirectly refused to admit Jews, who were concentrated in Moldavia. Cuza's successor, Carol I, refused suggestions that he become a Freemason and take the reins of the National Lodge, indeed ordering the closure of the Lodge in Brăila, which counted wealthy Jewish and Greek merchants among its members. Romanian Freemasons helped promote international recognition for the Union of Transylvania with Romania in 1918.

On 12 November 1925 the Great Orient of Romania was formed, which functioned alongside the Grand National Lodge. In 1934, these two merged with the Grand Symbolic Lodge of Transylvania to form the United Romanian Freemasonry, led by Mihail Sadoveanu and under American obedience. During the 1930s, Freemasonry was openly attacked in Romania, chiefly by A. C. Cuza, head of the National-Christian Defense League; the Iron Guard; and the Romanian Orthodox Church. On 11 March 1937, the church's Holy Synod approved an anti-Masonic study prepared by Nicolae Bălan, Metropolitan of Transylvania; this targeted Jews, who "have a preponderant, even a dominant role in Freemasonry" and concluded that "Freemasonry is a secret global organisation in which the Jews have a significant role; it has a quasi-religious rite, fighting against the religious-moral concepts of Christianity, against the monarchic and national principle, in order to establish an international secular republic. It is an expression of moral decay, of social disorder. The Church condemns Freemasonry as a doctrine, as an organisation and as a method of occult workings". As a result of these attacks, Romanian Freemasonry dissolved itself in 1937. Masonic historiography blames King Carol II, himself a Freemason, for having taken a decision to shut down the group with the support of Patriarch Miron Cristea (another Freemason) in order to rule as absolute monarch (which he began to do the following year).

Freemasonry reappeared after the coup of August 1944 but once again ceased its activity in 1948, not as a result of a political decision by the new Communist regime or coercive action by the Securitate, but due to a recommendation by its leadership. Romanian Freemasons in exile continued their activity until the 1989 revolution, after which Freemasonry returned to the country. The National Grand Lodge of Romania (Marea Lojă Națională din România), which brought together three Lodges, was established in 1993. It holds recognition from the United Grand Lodge of England, and in turn recognises over 200 foreign Grand Lodges.

The Grand Lodge of Romania (Marea Lojă a României), uniting ten Lodges, came into being in 2003. Four more Masonic groups are active: another National Grand Lodge of Romania (Marea Lojă Națională a României), the National United Grand Lodge of Romania (Marea Lojă Națională Unită din România), the Feminine Grand Lodge of Romania (Marea Lojă Feminină a României) and the Grand Orient of Romania (Marele Orient al României).

== Members ==
Romanian Freemasons have included:

- Dimitrie Sturdza
- Alexandru Sturdza
- Simion Bărnuțiu
- Teodor Balș
- Gheorghe Grigore Cantacuzino
- Grigore Brâncoveanu
- Alexandru Vaida-Voevod
- George Valentin Bibescu (Grand Master from 1911 to 1916)
- Constantin Argetoianu
- Nicolae Titulescu
- Carol Davila
- Victor Eftimiu
- Horia Hulubei
- Mihai Ralea
- Gheorghe Asachi
- Ion Heliade Rădulescu
- Eufrosin Poteca
- Ion Câmpineanu
- N. D. Cocea
- Octavian Goga
- Alecu Russo
- Titu Maiorescu
- Ion Minulescu
- Alexandru Paleologu
- Traian Vuia
- Duiliu Zamfirescu
- Matei Millo
- Stelian Nistor (Sovereign Grand Inspector General and President of the Scottish Rite from July 2021)

== Notes ==
=== Bibliography ===
- Gould, Robert Freke (1887). Gould's History of Freemasonry Throughout the World, Volume III. Charles Scribner's Sons.
- Djuvara, Neagu, Între Orient și Occident. Țările române la începutul epocii moderne, Humanitas, Bucharest, 1995. ISBN 973-28-0523-4
- Stoica, Stan (editor). Dicționar de Istorie a României. Bucharest: Editura Merona, 2007.
