= Alexandru G. Golescu =

Romanian politician (1819–1881)

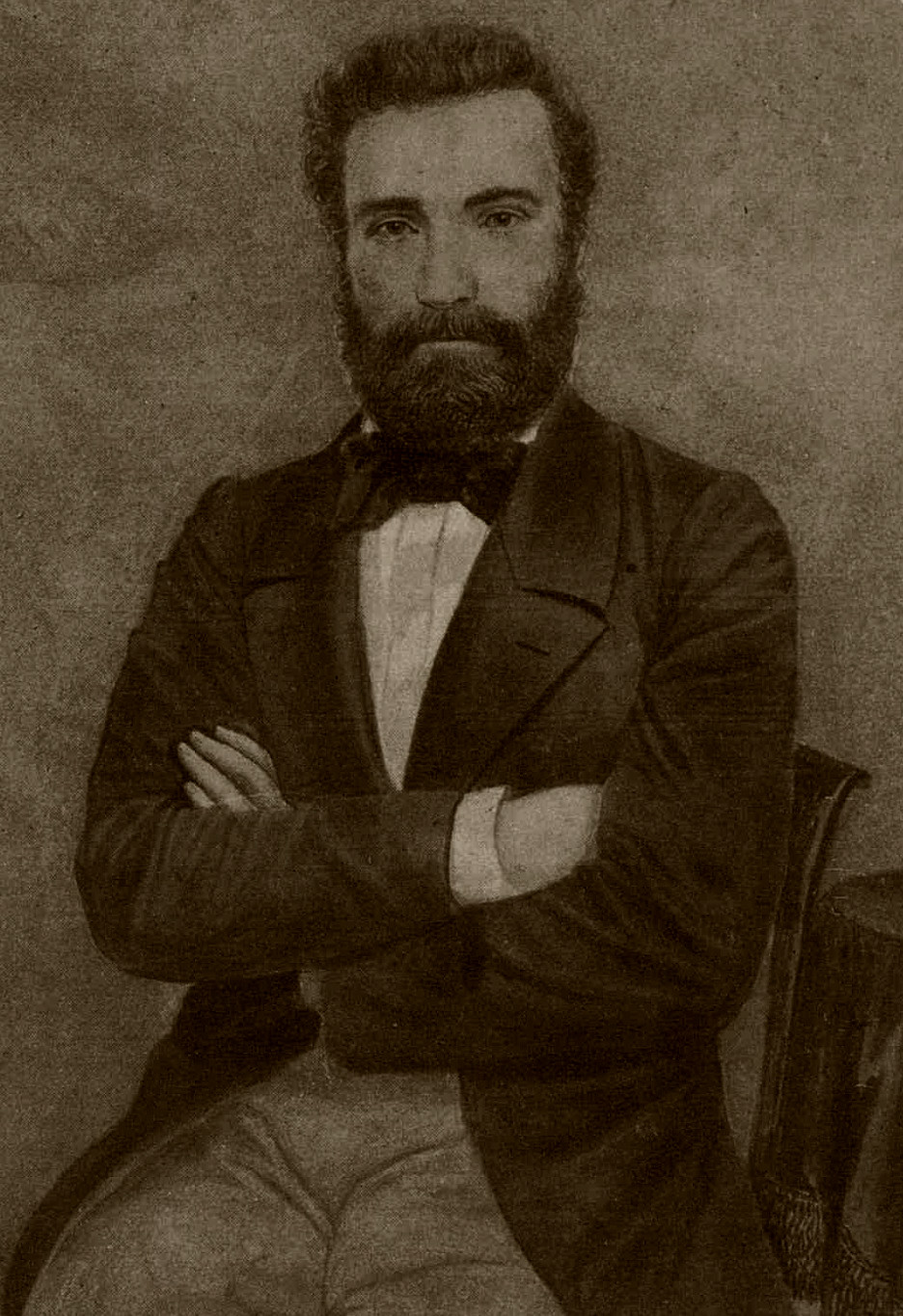

Prime Minister of Romania
- In office 2 February 1870 – 18 April 1870
- Monarch: Carol I
- Preceded by: Dimitrie Ghica
- Succeeded by: Manolache Costache Epureanu

Personal details
- Born: 1819 Bucharest, Wallachia
- Died: 15 August 1881 (aged 61–62) Rusănești, Olt County, Kingdom of Romania
- Education: École d'Arts et Métiers

Alexandru G. Golescu (Romanian pronunciation: [alekˈsandru ɡoˈlesku]; 1819 – 15 August 1881) was a Romanian politician who served as a prime minister of Romania in 1870.

== Early life ==
Born in the Golescu family of boyars in Bucharest, Wallachia, he was the cousin of the brothers Ștefan and Nicolae Golescu; Alexandru G. was often referred to as Alexandru Golescu Negru (Golescu the Black), to distinguish him from his relative and fellow activist Alexandru C. Golescu (who was known as "Albu" – the White).

Alexandru G. Golescu studied at the Saint Sava Academy and then in Paris, at the École d'Arts et Métiers, after which he returned to be an engineer in Wallachia.

Together with Nicolae Bălcescu, Ion Ghica and Christian Tell, Golescu was a founding member of the Frăția ("Brotherhood"), a radical secret society in 1843, meant as opposition to Wallachian Prince Gheorghe Bibescu. He returned to Paris in 1845 to be a member of a revolutionary society of the Romanian students.

== Revolution and later years ==
He took part in the Wallachian revolution of 1848, and were members of the Revolutionary Committee formed around Frăția. He was a secretary of the Provisional Government, and served as its representative in France after 14 July 1848 (in this capacity, he called for the French Second Republic's support in combating the threat of Ottoman and Imperial Russian intervention in Wallachia). Golescu was also active in negotiating an agreement between the Hungarian government of Lajos Kossuth and the Transylvanian Romanian forces of Avram Iancu, but his efforts were largely unsuccessful.

After the revolution in Bucharest was crushed, Ghica remained in exile until 1856, when, after Russian presence had been swept by the effects of the Crimean War he returned to campaign for the unification of Wallachia and Moldavia, which was successful in 1859 when Alexandru Ioan Cuza was elected Domnitor of the two Danubian Principalities. He later served several times as minister and once, for only half a year, as prime minister under Prince Carol. He died at his estate in Rusănești, Olt County.

== Works ==
- Die politische Stellung der Roumänen, Vienna, 1848
- De l'abolition du servage dans les Principautés Danubiennes, Paris, 1856
