= Ștefan Golescu =

Romanian politician (1809–1874)

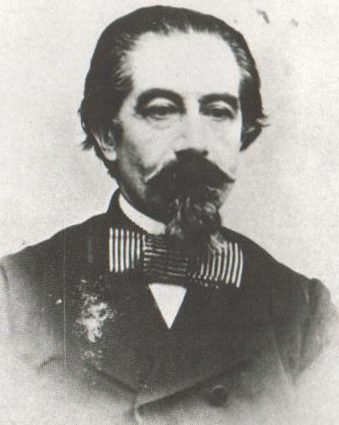

8th Prime Minister of Romania
- In office 26 November 1867 – 12 May 1868
- Monarch: Carol I
- Preceded by: Constantin A. Kretzulescu
- Succeeded by: Nicolae Golescu

Minister of Foreign Affairs
- In office 1 March 1867 – 5 August 1867
- Prime Minister: Constantin A. Kretzulescu
- Preceded by: George Barbu Știrbei
- Succeeded by: Alexandru Teriachiu
- In office 13 November 1867 – 30 April 1868
- Prime Minister: himself
- Preceded by: Alexandru Teriachiu
- Succeeded by: Nicolae Golescu

Minister of Internal Affairs
- In office 17 August 1867 – 13 November 1867
- Preceded by: Ion C. Brătianu
- Succeeded by: Ion C. Brătianu

Personal details
- Born: 1809 Câmpulung, Wallachia
- Died: 27 August 1874 (aged 64–65) Nancy, France

Ștefan Golescu (Romanian pronunciation: [ʃteˈfan ɡoˈlesku]; 1809–1874) was a Wallachian Romanian politician who served as the Minister of Foreign Affairs for two terms from 1 March 1867 to 5 August 1867 and from 13 November 1867 to 30 April 1868, and as Prime Minister of Romania between 26 November 1867 and 12 May 1868.

== Biography ==
Golescu was the son of writer, educationist and pioneer Romanian nationalist, Dinicu Golescu. Born in Câmpulung into a boyar family of the Golești, he studied with his brothers (Nicolae and Radu) in Switzerland. After he returned, he joined the Wallachian Army and became a major in 1836. With his brother he also joined the Philharmonic Society, a society similar to the Freemasonry.

Ștefan Golescu was involved in the triggering of the 1848 Wallachian revolution, participating in the Islaz gathering of 9 June 1848, when he became a member of the Provisional Government, serving as Minister of Justice.

During the writing of the new constitution, he supported Nicolae Bălcescu's idea of universal suffrage, while his brother, Nicolae, favoured less expansive participation. Ștefan Golescu was part of the delegation sent by the revolutionaries to Istanbul to negotiate the new constitution with the Ottoman Empire, Wallachia's overlord.

Golescu was a member of the Wallachian assembly that elected Alexandru Ioan Cuza as prince of both Wallachia and Moldavia (1859). Afterwards, he was a member of the Liberal Party of Ion C. Brătianu and served for about half a year as Prime Minister of Romania in a Liberal government.
