= Neophyte II of Ungro-Wallachia =

Romanian Orthodox metropolitan bishop

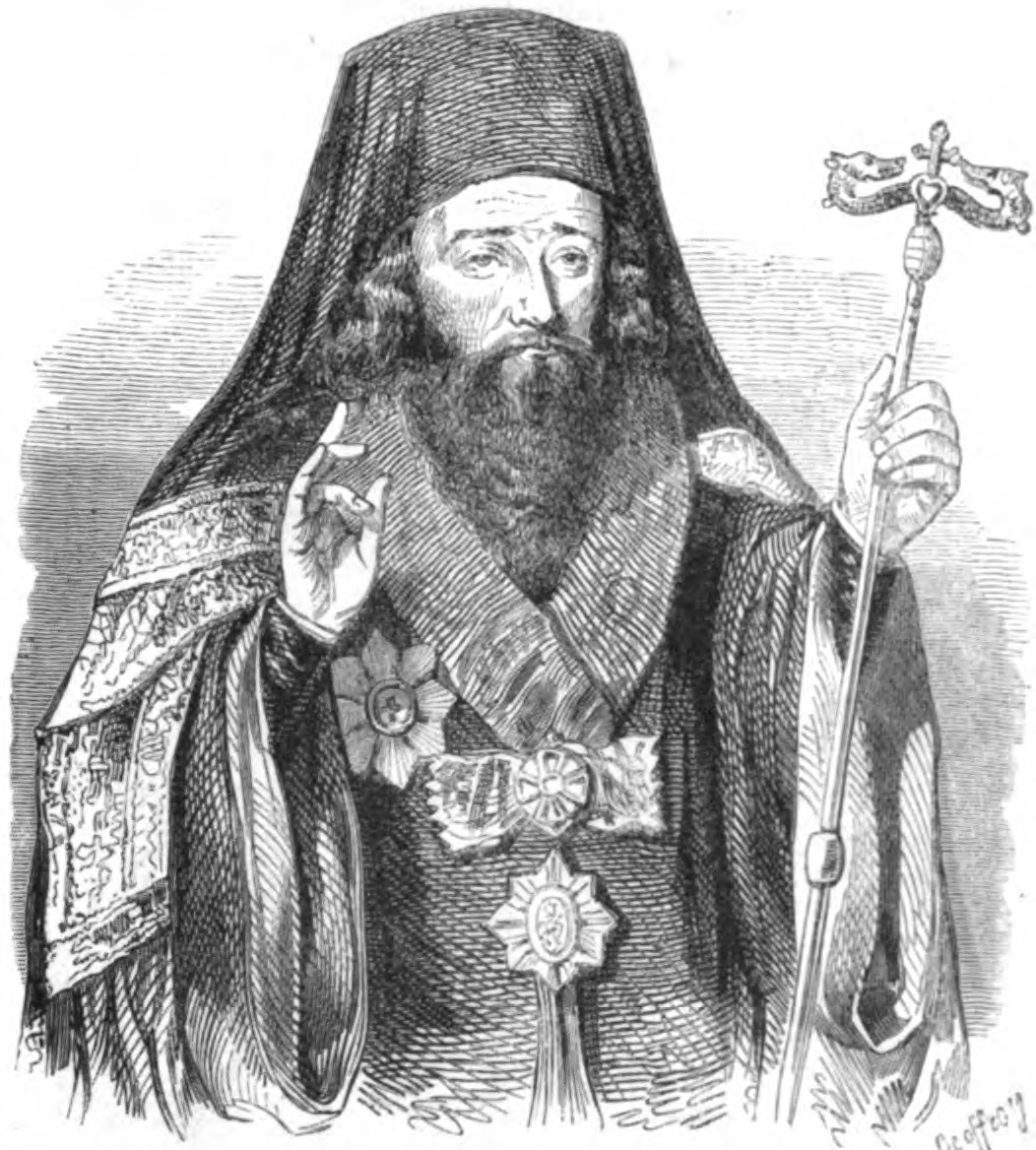
- Native name: Neofit al II-lea
- Church: Romanian Orthodox Church
- Metropolis: Metropolis of Ungro-Wallachia
- Appointed: 29 June 1840
- In office: 29 June 1840 – 27 July 1849

Personal details
- Born: 1 January 1787; Bucharest
- Died: 14 January 1850 (aged 63); Bucharest

Neophyte II (Romanian: Neofit al II-lea, secular name Neofit Gianoglu, Greek: Νεόφυτος Γιανόγλου; 1 January 1787 – 14 January 1850) was the Romanian Orthodox Metropolitan of Ungro-Wallachia (1840–1849), and a participant in the Wallachian Revolution of 1848.

== Biography ==
He was born in Bucharest in 1787. He was ordained hierodeacon in 1818, hieromonk on 29 March 1824 and archimandrite on 5 April 1824. He became Abbot of the Sfântul Gheorghe Nou Monastery in Bucharest, was elected Bishop of Râmnicu on 18 April 1824, and on 20 April he was ordained bishop by Gregory IV, the Teacher, Metropolitan of Ungro-Wallachia.

He agreed to be vicar of the Metropolitanate from February 1829 to 22 August 1833, while Gregory IV was exiled in Russia and also after his death on 22 June between 1834 and 1840. From 29 June 1840 to 27 July 1849, he was officially appointed Metropolitan of Ungro-Wallachia.

In 1831 he became a member of the Extraordinary Public Revision Assembly and was appointed president of the Royal Divan.

During the Wallachian Revolution of 1848 (July–September 1848), he was invited by the Revolutionary Committee to become Chairman of the Provisional Government, which he accepted on 12 July. He fiercely opposed the reform plans of radicals within the government, such as Nicolae Bălcescu. He eventually turned against the Provisional Government, but his coup d'état failed and he was replaced on 9 August 1848, by a radical triumvirate consisting of Ion Heliade Rădulescu, Nicolae Golescu and Christian Tell.

After the suppression of the Revolution he requested (as Metropolitan) the restoration of order and contributed to the capture of clerics who had engaged in revolutionary actions, which led to him being considered a controversial figure from 1848. On July 27, 1849, he retired from the metropolitan seat.

As a metropolitan, he set up four theological seminaries in Wallachia and supported sending young people to scholarships in Greece and Russia.

He died in Bucharest on 14 January 1850.
