= Gheorghe Magheru =

Romanian revolutionary

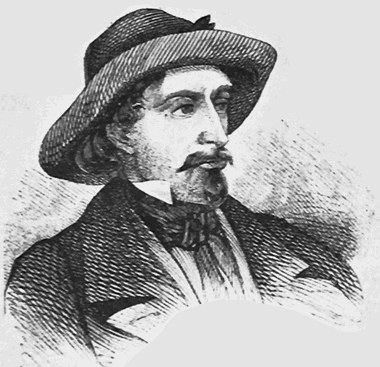
- Born: 8 April 1802; Bârzeiul de Gilort, Gorj County, Wallachia
- Died: 23 March 1880 (aged 77) Bucharest, Romania
- Allegiance: Wallachia; Russian Empire
- Branch: Wallachian Army
- Rank: General
- Conflicts: Russo-Turkish War (1828–1829); Wallachian uprising of 1821
- Awards: Order of Saint Anna; Gold Sword for Bravery

General Gheorghe Magheru (Romanian pronunciation: [ˈɡe̯orɡe maˈɡeru]; 8 April 1802, Bârzeiul de Gilort, Gorj County – 23 March 1880 Bucharest) was a Romanian revolutionary and soldier from Wallachia, and political ally of Nicolae Bălcescu.

== A Pandur and radical conspirator ==
Magheru began his activities as an Oltenian hajduk in the area around Băilești, and led his group into volunteering for the Imperial Russian side in the Russo-Turkish War — playing a part in the almost impossible victory of the small Russian vanguard under General Geismar over the dominating Ottoman forces at the battle of Băilești 26–27 September 1828. For his personal contribution, Magheru was decorated with the Order of Saint Anna III class — and the Gold Sword for Bravery to wear it — by the personal edict of Tsar Nicholas I.

He was one of the first Pandurs to join the Wallachian uprising of 1821 under the leadership of Tudor Vladimirescu. After the latter's assassination and the rebellion's failure, he returned to life as a local outlaw, only to join the Wallachian Army after a few years.

A competent soldier, Magheru went through several ranks in quick succession; at the same time, his past and career made him an important asset for the young radicals, who quickly won him for their side. He joined the Freemasonry-inspired Frăția ("Brotherhood") secret society, founded in 1834 by Bălcescu, Christian Tell, and Ion Ghica, one which aimed to counter the arbitrary rule of Alexandru Ghica, and then plotting against Gheorghe Bibescu.

== Râureni ==
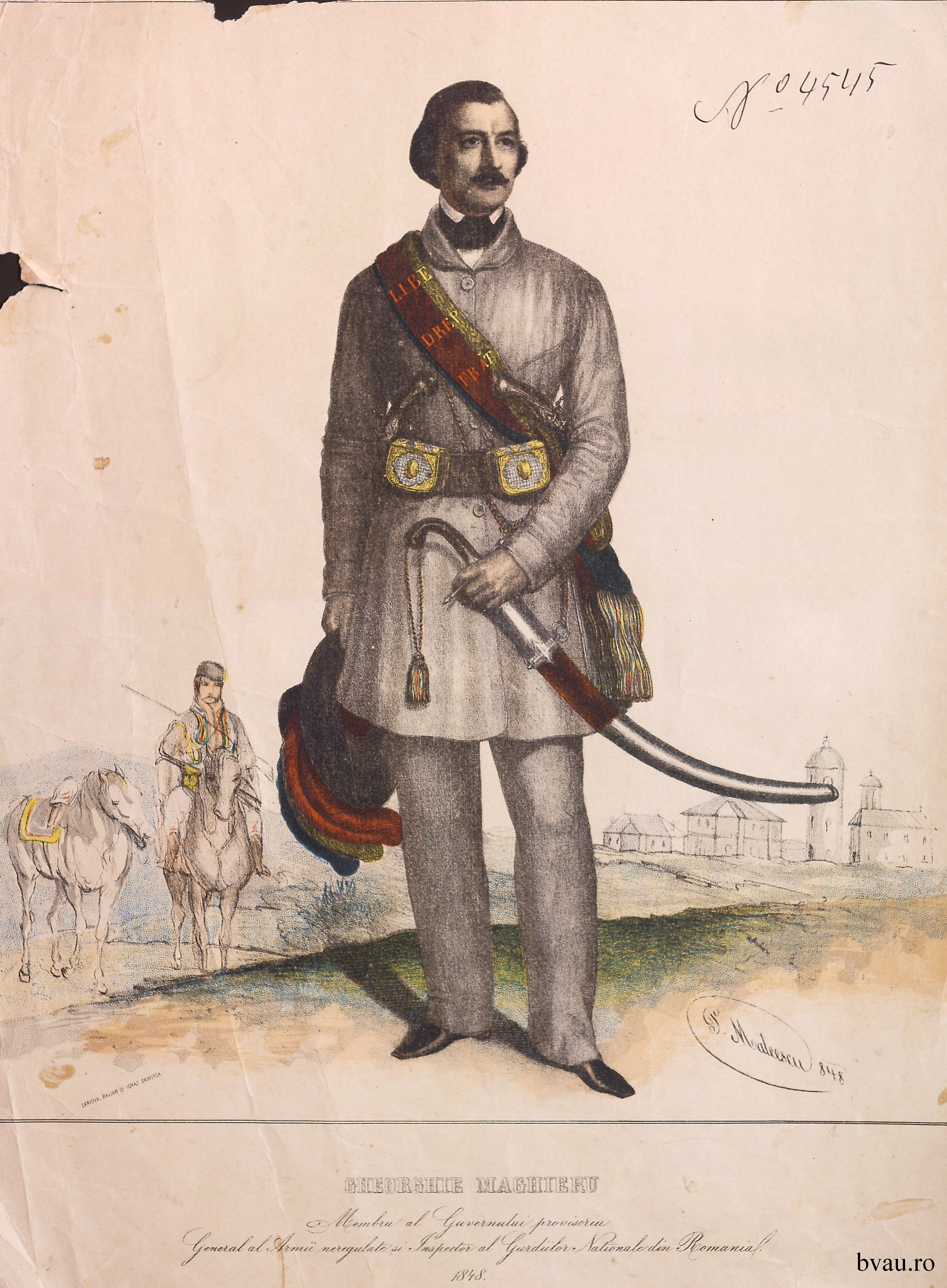
General Magheru in 1848

After the outbreak of the 1848 Wallachian Revolution, Magheru served in the Provisional government formed by the radicals.

He is noted for organizing the revolutionary and Pandur army camp in Râureni—on the grounds belonging to the Schitu Troianu Monastery, at the time near Râmnicu Vâlcea (and now part of the city).

Magheru intended to use the army camp as a base for opposing threats to the Revolution, as early as the summer of that year. However, when the Ottoman troops swept into Bucharest in September, he ordered his troops to disband. In this, he probably followed the advice of the United Kingdom consul in the Wallachian capital. The pro-Ottoman attitude remained prevalent among revolutionaries: they had been well received by the Turks, who saw them as a means to oppose the overwhelming Russian influence over the Danubian Principalities, and were probably right in seeing the Turkish move as prompted exclusively by Russian requests (with Abd-ul-Mejid I careful not to leave the countries opened to the full force of Russian repression, which soon joined the Turkish armies in the occupation). This created the paradox of Russia enforcing conservative policies in Wallachia and Moldavia, while most revolutionaries were taking refuge in Istanbul. Magheru was very likely aware of such nuances, and he probably thought it best not to provoke a violent response.

== Exile ==
In exile in Paris (mainly), Magheru was involved in many activities of the Wallachian émigrés. He expressed his concern that the Transylvanian Revolution of Romanian Austrian subjects, aimed at the separatist Hungarian government, was likely to provoke the Romanian fighters under Avram Iancu to side with a Russian intervention, thus making it impossible for Wallachia to negotiate or fight its way out of the occupation.

He approached the Hungarian leader Lajos Kossuth in January 1849, with a project that would have replaced the tight centralization with a confederation between Hungary and a more Romanian than not Transylvania.

The project was ignored by both sides: the Transylvanian Romanians thought of themselves as loyal subjects of the Habsburg Crown, and had already suffered waves of violence after Józef Bem's armies marched into the region (in the very same project, Magheru asked that Kossuth renounce the politics of repression and revolutionary terror).

== Later life and legacy ==
Magheru returned to Wallachia and was active in Partida Națională, the movement working for the Union of Moldavia and Wallachia (it was largely composed of former 1848-activists in the two countries). Their political ideal was fulfilled on 24 January 1859, when the already Prince of Moldavia Alexandru Ioan Cuza was elected in Bucharest.

One of the main arteries in Bucharest bears Magheru's name (see Bulevardul Magheru), and the campsite in Râureni is now a museum. He is honored on a postage stamp issued by the Romanian Postal Service.
