= Albeni =

- Commune
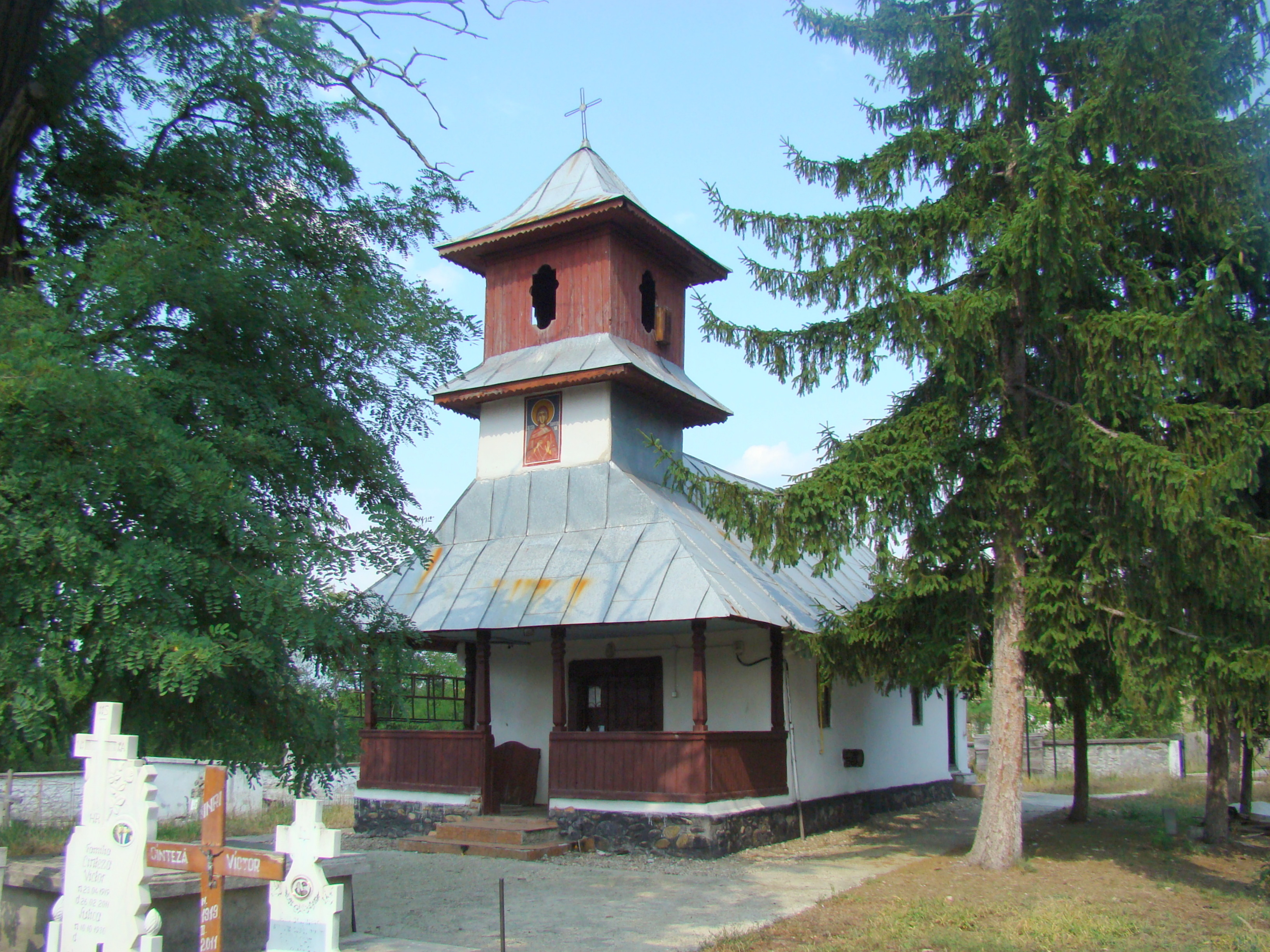
- Wooden church in Mirosloveni

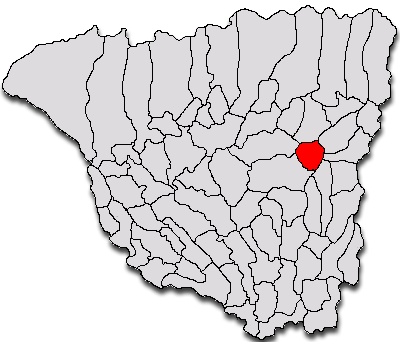
- Location in Gorj County

- Location in Romania
- Coordinates: 45°02′N 23°36′E
- Country: Romania
- County: Gorj
- Subdivisions: Albeni, Bârzeiu de Gilort, Bolbocești, Doseni, Mirosloveni, Prunești

Government
  - Mayor (2020–2024): Silviu Ionuț Stan (PNL)
- Area: 45.11 km^{2} (17.42 sq mi)
- Elevation: 260 m (850 ft)
- Population (2021-12-01): 2,502
  - Density: 55.46/km^{2} (143.7/sq mi)
- Time zone: UTC+02:00 (EET)
  - Summer (DST): UTC+03:00 (EEST)
- Postal code: 217005
- Area code: +40 x53
- Vehicle reg.: GJ
- Website: primariaalbeni.ro

Albeni is a commune in Gorj County, Oltenia, Romania. It is composed of six villages: Albeni, Bârzeiu de Gilort, Bolbocești, Doseni, Mirosloveni, and Prunești.

== Natives ==
- Gheorghe Magheru (1802–1880), revolutionary and general in the Wallachian Army
