= Alexandru Teriachiu =

Romanian politician

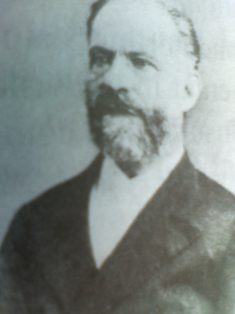

Minister of Culture and Public Instruction
- In office April 27, 1859 – April 3, 1860
- Monarch: Alexandru Ioan Cuza

Minister of Foreign Affairs
- In office August 17, 1867 – November 12, 1867
- Monarch: Carol I of Romania
- Preceded by: Ștefan Golescu
- Succeeded by: Ștefan Golescu

Minister of Internal Affairs
- In office July 20, 1880 – April 5, 1881
- Monarch: Carol I of Romania
- Preceded by: Anastase Stolojan
- Succeeded by: Eugeniu Stătescu

Personal details
- Born: 1829 Tecuci, Principality of Moldavia
- Died: March 2, 1893 (aged 63–64) Bucharest, Kingdom of Romania

Alexandru Teriachiu (1829 – March 2, 1893) was a Romanian politician who served as the Minister of Foreign Affairs.

== Life and career ==
Teriachiu was born in 1829 in Tecuci, Principality of Moldavia. He studied in Paris and was active in the Romanian student organization at the university. He returned to Moldavia after the unification of Moldavia and Wallachia and became a member of the Tecuci Union and deputy secretary of the ad hoc Divan in 1856.

Teriachiu served as the Minister of Culture and Public Instruction from April 27, 1859, until April 3, 1860, Minister of Foreign Affairs from August 17, 1867, until November 12, 1867, and as the Minister of Internal Affairs from July 20, 1880, until April 5, 1881.

== Sources ==
- Stan Stoica (coord.) - Dicționar biografic de istorie a României (Ed. Meronia, București, 2008)
