= Constantin A. Kretzulescu =

Romanian academic and politician (1809–1884)

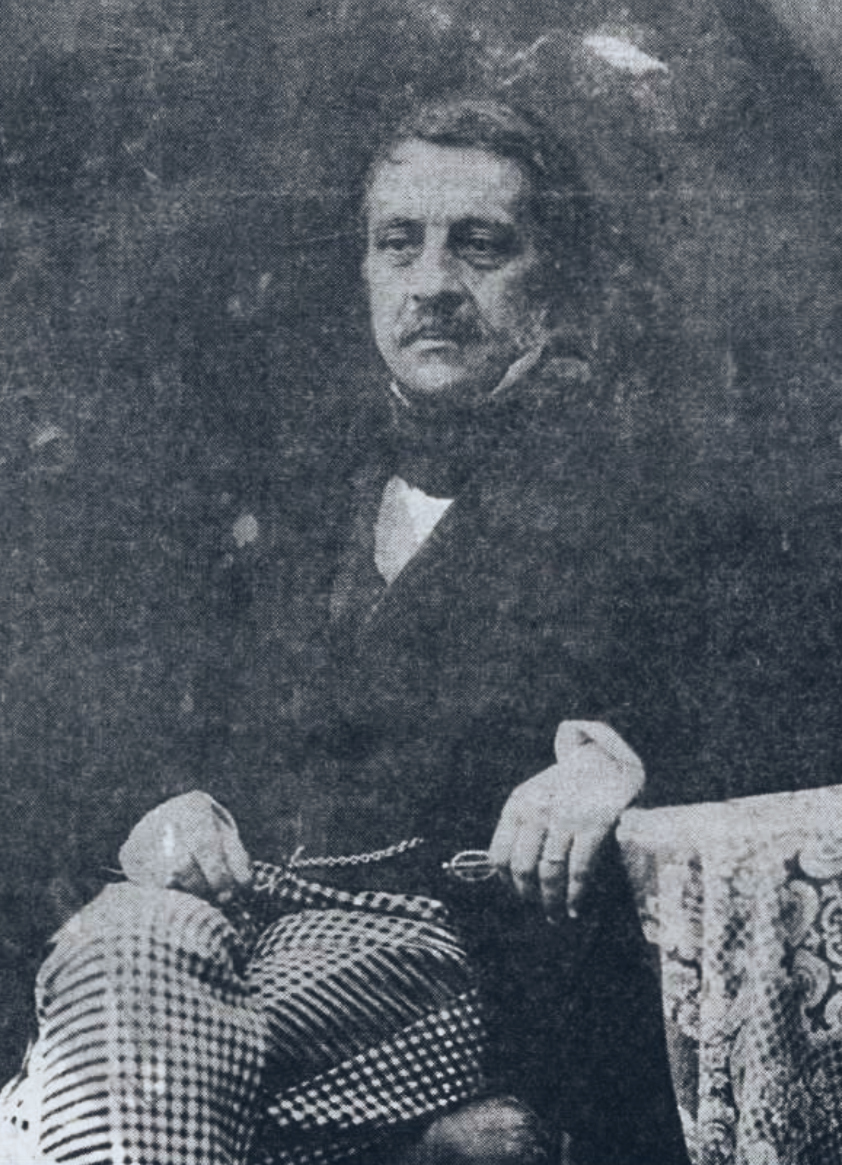

7th Prime Minister of Romania
- In office 1 March 1867 – 5 August 1867
- Monarch: Carol I
- Preceded by: Ion Ghica
- Succeeded by: Ștefan Golescu

Personal details
- Born: 22 May 1809 Bucharest, Wallachia
- Died: 21 March 1884 (aged 74) Bucharest, Kingdom of Romania
- Party: National Liberal Party
- Parents: Ana 'Anica' Câmpineanu; Alexandru Kretzulescu
- Relatives: Nicolae Kretzulescu, Scarlat Kretzulescu (brothers)

Constantin A. Kretzulescu (Romanian pronunciation: [konstanˈtin kret͡suˈlesku], surname also spelled Crețulescu; 22 May 1809 – 21 March 1884) was a Romanian academic, politician, and honorary member of the Romanian Academy from 1871. He served as Prime Minister of Romania and Minister of Justice from 1 March 1867 until 5 August 1867.

Born in Bucharest, he studied domestically at a Greek school and then in 1831 he enlisted in the army with the rank of second lieutenant, serving until 1840, when he left the army with the rank of major and was appointed prefect of Brăila County; then he became prosecutor at the High Court. In 1842 he resigned and spent several years in France, England and Italy, studying literature, philosophy and history.

Returning to the country, he lived a private life until 1857, when we find him as president of the Wallachia committee for the elections of the ad-hoc divan. At this time, he founded the newspaper Concordia, which he later passed on to C. A. Rosetti. In 1867 he was president of the Council of Ministers and Minister of the Interior from March 1 to August 17 of the same year.

He was the brother of Nicolae Kretzulescu.
