= Nicolae Golescu =

Romanian politician (1810–1877)

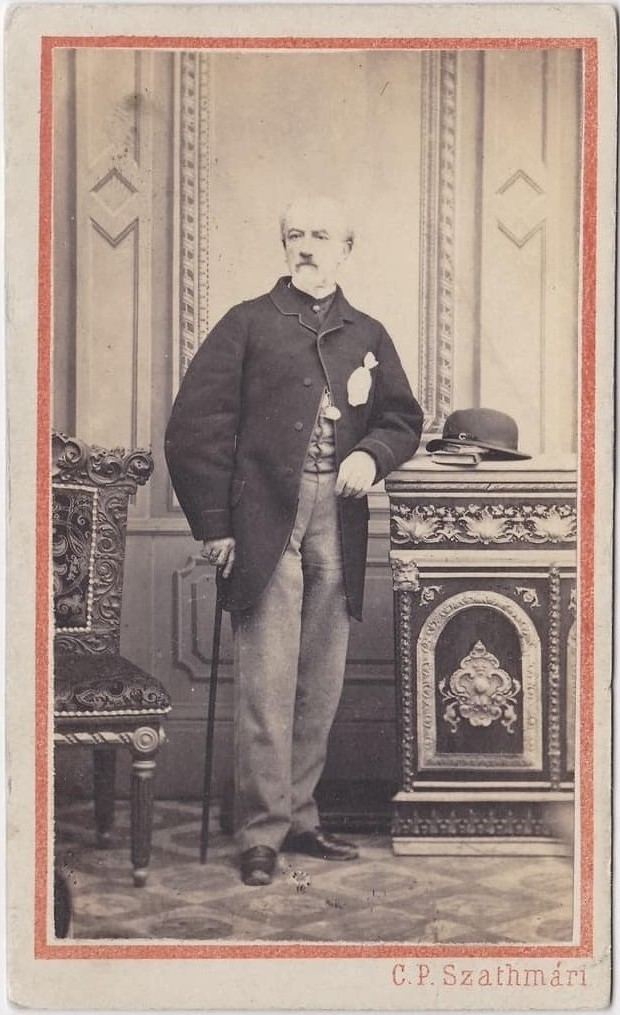

Prime Minister of Romania
- In office 1 May 1868 – 15 November 1868
- Monarch: Carol I
- Preceded by: Ștefan Golescu
- Succeeded by: Dimitrie Ghica

Personal details
- Born: December 6, 1809 Câmpulung, Wallachia
- Died: December 10, 1877 (aged 67–68) Bucharest, Kingdom of Romania
- Party: National Liberal Party
- Parents: Dinicu Golescu (father); Zoe Golescu (mother)
- Relatives: Ștefan Golescu
- Occupation: Politician

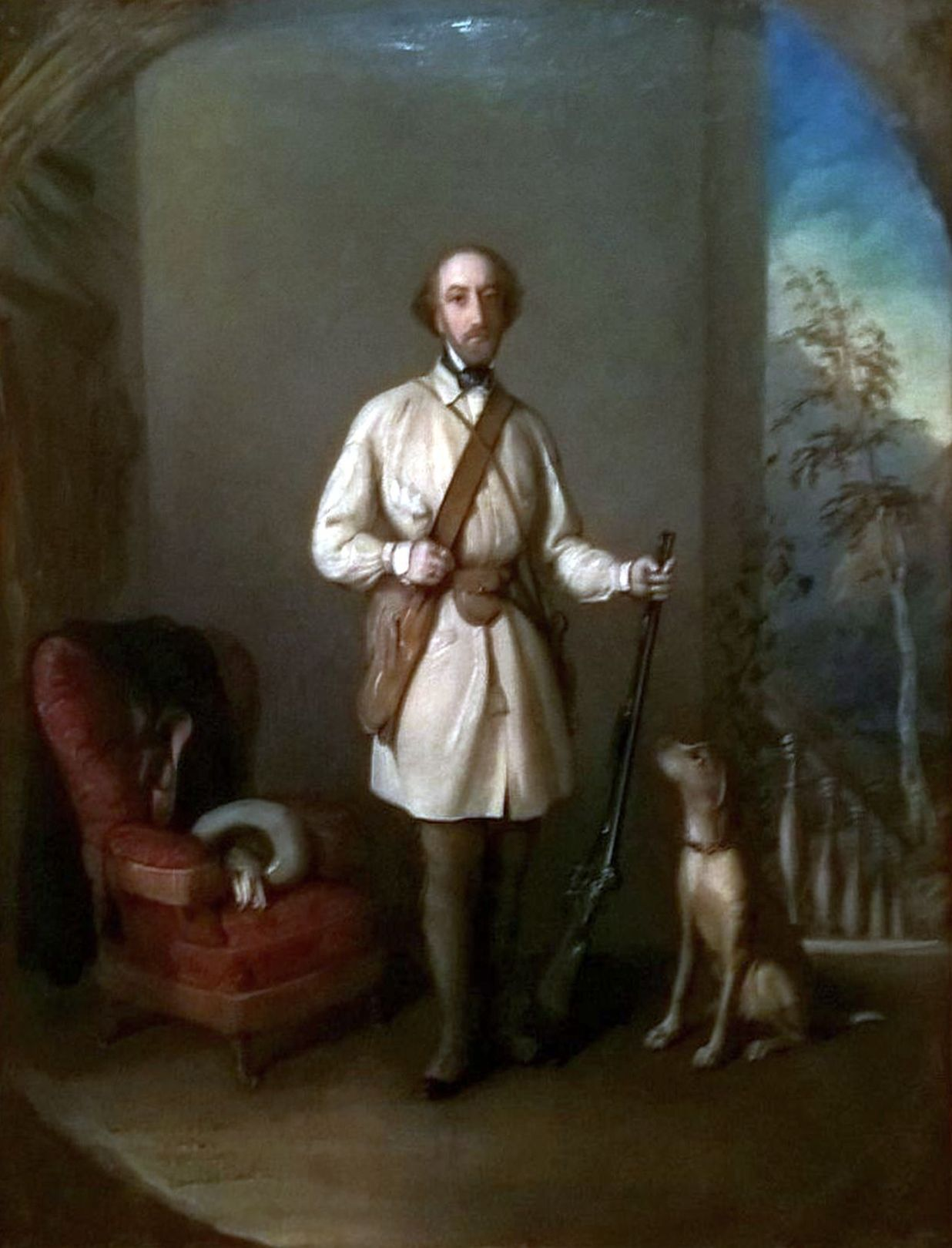
Portrait by Constantin Daniel Rosenthal

Nicolae Golescu (Romanian pronunciation: [nikoˈla.e ɡoˈlesku]; 1810–1877) was a Wallachian Romanian politician who served as the Prime Minister of Romania in 1860 and May–November 1868.

== Early life ==
A member of the Golescu family of boyars, Nicolae was born in Câmpulung as the son of Dinicu Golescu; he was educated together with his other three brothers in Switzerland. Nicolae and his brother Ștefan returned in 1830 to join the Wallachian Army, where Nicolae became a major in 1834.

In the same year he joined the Philharmonic Society, a group similar to the Freemasonry. In 1840 he was a prosecutor in the trial of the participants in the Mitică Filipescu plot, and later on he was Wallachia's Minister of Internal Affairs.

In 1842, Wallachia was under the protectorate of Imperial Russia, and Nicolae Golescu tried to obtain the mandate of Prince of Wallachia from Emperor Nicholas, but was denied and remained a Minister of Internal Affairs until 1847. In the meantime, he began taking part in gatherings of various revolutionary societies.

He joined the radical liberals, being part of the 1848 revolutionary committee, together with Ion Ghica, Nicolae Bălcescu, Ion Heliade Rădulescu and others (including his brother Ștefan and his cousin Alexandru G. Golescu).

== Prominence ==
Afterwards, on 11 June 1848, when the Wallachian revolution started in Bucharest, Nicolae Golescu was a Minister of Internal Affairs for the Provisional Government. The following week, he and Ana Ipătescu took initiative in rallying civilians in defense of the revolutionary power, as it was threatened by conservative plot (June 19).

However, on 25 July, the government resigned on pressure from the Ottoman Empire, and after the Ottoman intervention of September, Nicolae Golescu went into exile, to return in the 1850s and support Alexandru Ioan Cuza's bid for the throne of a united Danubian Principalities (Wallachia and Moldavia).

In 1866, after joining the alliance of Liberals and Conservatives against Cuza's unsanctioned personal regime, he was for a short time one of the regents. He was then Foreign Minister and a member of Ion C. Brătianu's Liberal Party, formed during the rule of Carol I.
