= Christian Tell =

Romanian general and politician (1808–1884)

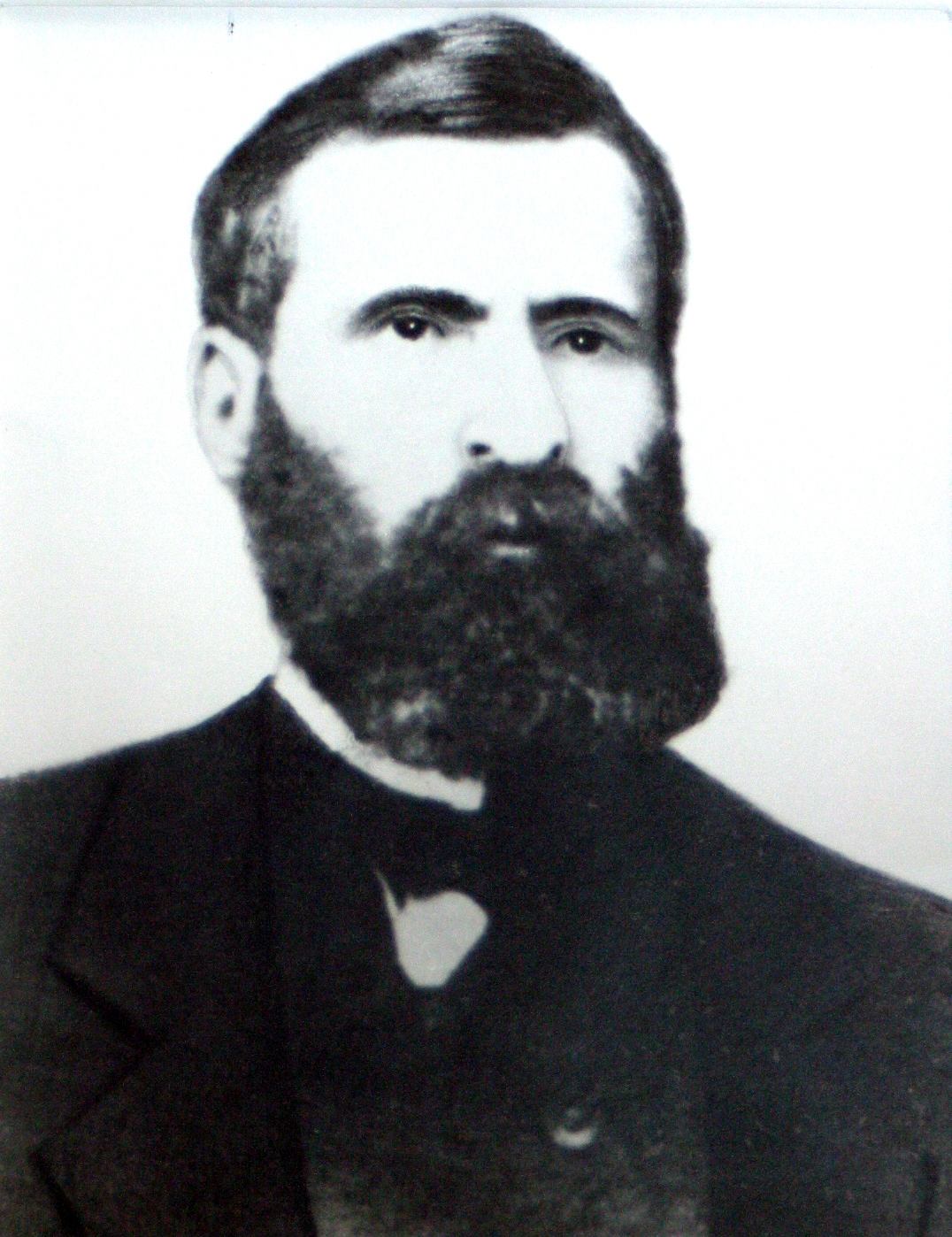

Minister in the Provisional Government of the Romanian Country
- In office 9 June 1848 – 19 July 1848

Member of the Royal Lieutenant of the Wallachia
- In office 19 July 1848 – 13 September 1848

Minister of National Defense
- In office 11 March 1871 – 14 March 1871
- Prime Minister: Lascăr Catargiu
- Preceded by: Eustațiu Pencovici
- Succeeded by: Ioan Emanoil Florescu

Personal details
- Born: 12 January 1808 Brassó, Kingdom of Hungary, Austrian Empire
- Died: 4 February 1884 (aged 76) Bucharest, Kingdom of Romania
- Party: Conservative Party
- Education: Saint Sava National College
- Occupation: Civil servant

Christian Tell (12 January 1808 – 4/16 February 1884) was a Transylvanian-born Wallachian and Romanian general and politician.

== Life and activity ==
He was born in Brașov on 12 January 1808. He studied at the Saint Sava National College in Bucharest, where he had Gheorghe Lazăr and Ion Heliade Rădulescu as teachers. He was influenced by Ion Heliade Rădulescu, sharing his moderate approach, regarding the national affirmation of Romanians.

Christian Tell was enrolled in the military forces of the Ottoman Empire, fighting in the Russo-Turkish War (1828–29), where he received the rank of captain. In 1830, he entered the newly formed army of the Romanian Country, constantly advancing in the military ranks. In 1834 he married Târșița Ștefănescu, the daughter of a small Oltic boyar.

In 1843, together with Ion Ghica and Nicolae Bălcescu, he established the foundations of the Bucharest secret Brotherhood society - which was the engine of the revolution from 1848. He also supported in 1857 the election of Masonic MPs for the ad hoc Divan.

At the outbreak of the revolution of 1848, Christian Tell mobilized the troops he commanded in support of the revolutionaries in the Romanian Country, becoming known as the "sword of the revolution". He was present at the meeting on 9 June 1848, which issued the Proclamation of Islaz, being named among the five members of the provisional government established at that time. Christian Tell was also part of the new provisional government established in Bucharest, and after 19 July 1848, he was a member of the royal lieutenant (together with Ion Heliade Rădulescu and Nicolae Golescu). He campaigned for the establishment and endowment of the National Guard, being promoted to the rank of general.

After the defeat of the revolution of 1848, Tell had a difficult period of exile in France and then on the island of Chios and Izmir, a long period of time being separated from the family and confronted, as did most Romanians in deprivation, with financial difficulties. Together with the other two members of the royal lieutenancy, Ion Heliade Rădulescu and Nicolae Golescu, he tried to reorganize the Romanian emigration (moderate wing), sometimes conflicting with the radical wing (Brătienii, C. A. Rosetti, Ion Ghica).

In 1857 Christian Tell returned from exile. He was an active participant (deputy, coordinator of the Central Commission from Focsani) in the Unionist movement, which domnitor to the double election in 1859 of Alexandru Ioan Cuza and the establishment of the Romanian unitary state. Tell supported the ruler in his efforts to strengthen public authority and initiate reforms. Between December 1862 and 1866, the general became minister of education and culture, in the government of Nicolae Kretzulescu, and once again, between 1871 and 1874, in the government led by Lascăr Catargiu. Later, in 1876, the Liberals formed a new cabinet, while members of the Conservative government, including Tell, were sued for their actions when they were in power. The politician was acquitted and also exonerated of all the accusations brought because of his revolutionary past. The ruler in person intervened for him.

Christian Tell was deeply involved in the political life after 1866, enjoying great popularity and the sincere appreciation of Carol I. In the field of concrete achievements, his political contribution was perhaps modest, but significant at the level of human relations and promoting ethical principles in political life. He would also become a member of the Macedo-Romanian Cultural Society.

In his memory, his name was given to the street of Light, on which was the residence of the general. The location of this house can be seen on Bucharest's master plan of 1911. Unfortunately, the house was destroyed during the communist period, and a block of flats was built instead.
