= Metropolis of Muntenia and Dobruja =

Subdivision of the Romanian Orthodox Church

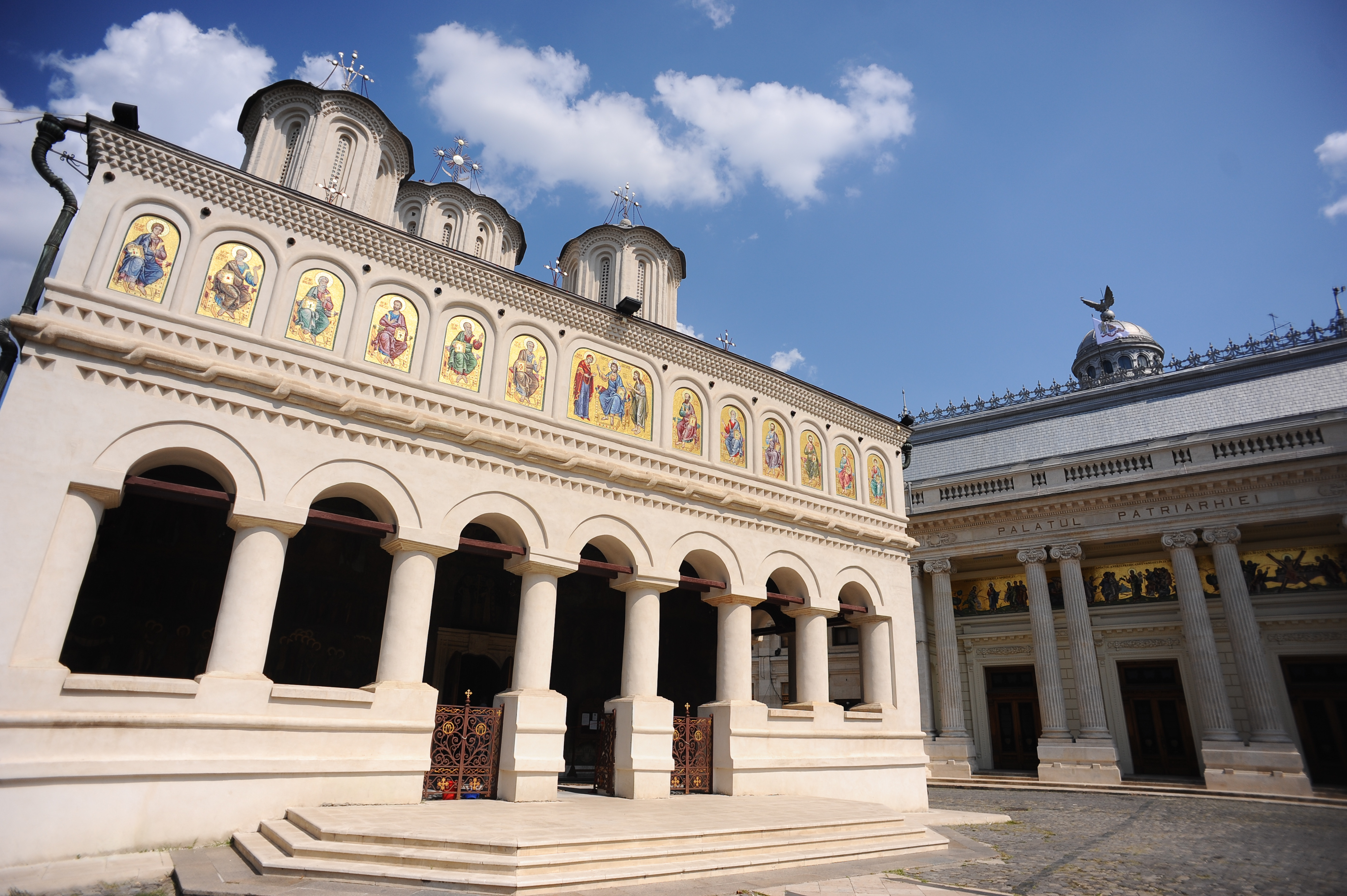
Romanian Patriarchal Cathedral in Bucharest is also the seat of Metropolis of Muntenia and Dobruja

The Metropolis of Wallachia and Dobruja, headquartered in Bucharest, Romania, is a metropolis of the Romanian Orthodox Church.

== History ==
The Metropolis of Ungro-Wallachia or Ungro-Vlachia was established in 1359 by Callistus I, the Ecumenical Patriarch of Constantinople, encompassing the territory of Wallachia. In 1381-1383 and perhaps until 1385, Ungro-Wallachia administered the metropolis of Nicomedia, due to its decline after its fall to the Ottomans.

In 1872, the Metropolis of Ungro-Wallachia united with the Metropolis of Moldavia to form the Romanian Orthodox Church. The Metropolis of Ungro-Wallachia, who received the title of Primate Metropolitan in 1865, became the head of the General Synod of the Romanian Orthodox Church. In 1990, it became Metropolis of Muntenia and Dobruja.

== List of metropolitans ==
- Maxim (1508–1512)
- Macarie II (1512–1521)
- Ilarion II (1521–1523)
  - vacancy (1523–1525)
- Teodor II (1525–1533)
- Mitrofan I (1533–1535)
- Varlaam I (1535–1544)
- Anania (1544–1558)
- Efrem (1558–1566)
- Danil I (1566)
  - vacancy (1566–1568)
- Eftimie I (1568–1576)
- Serafim (1576–1586)
- Mihail I (1586–1590)
- Nichifore (1590)
- Mihail II (1590–1594)
- Eftimie II (1594–1602)
- Luca (1602–1629)
- Grigore I (1629–1636)
- Teofil (1636–1648)
- Stefan (1648–1653)
- Ignațiu I (1653–1662)
- Stefan I (1662–1668), restored
- Teodosie (1668–1672)
- Dionisie (1672)
- Varlaam II (1672–1679)
  - Teodosie (1679–1708), restored
- Antim (1708–1716)
- Mitrofan II (1716–1719)
- Danil II (1719–1731)
- Ștefan II (1731–1738)
- Neofit I (1738–1753)
- Filaret I (1753–1760)
- Grigorie II (1760–1787)
- Cosma (1787–1792)
- Filaret II (1792–1793)
- Dositei (1793–1810)
- Ignațiu II (1810–1812)
- Nectarie (1812–1819)
  - vacancy (1819–1821)
- Dionisie II (1821–1823)
- Grigorie III (1823–1834)
  - vacancy (1834–1840)
- Neofit II (1840–1849)

As Metropolitans of All Romania

- Nifon (1850–1875)
- Calinic (1875–1886)
- Iosif (1886–1893)
- Ghenadie (1893–1896)
  - Iosif (1896–1909), restored
- Atanasie (1909–1911)
- Conon (1912–1919)
- Miron (1919–1925)

As Patriarchs of All Romania

- Miron (1925–1939)
- Nicodim (1939–1948)
- Iustinian (1948–1977)
- Iustin (1977–1986)
- Teoctist (1986–2007)
- Daniel (since 2007)

== See also ==
- History of Christianity in Romania
