= Proclamation of Islaz =

Manifesto adopted by the participants of the Wallachian Revolution of 1848

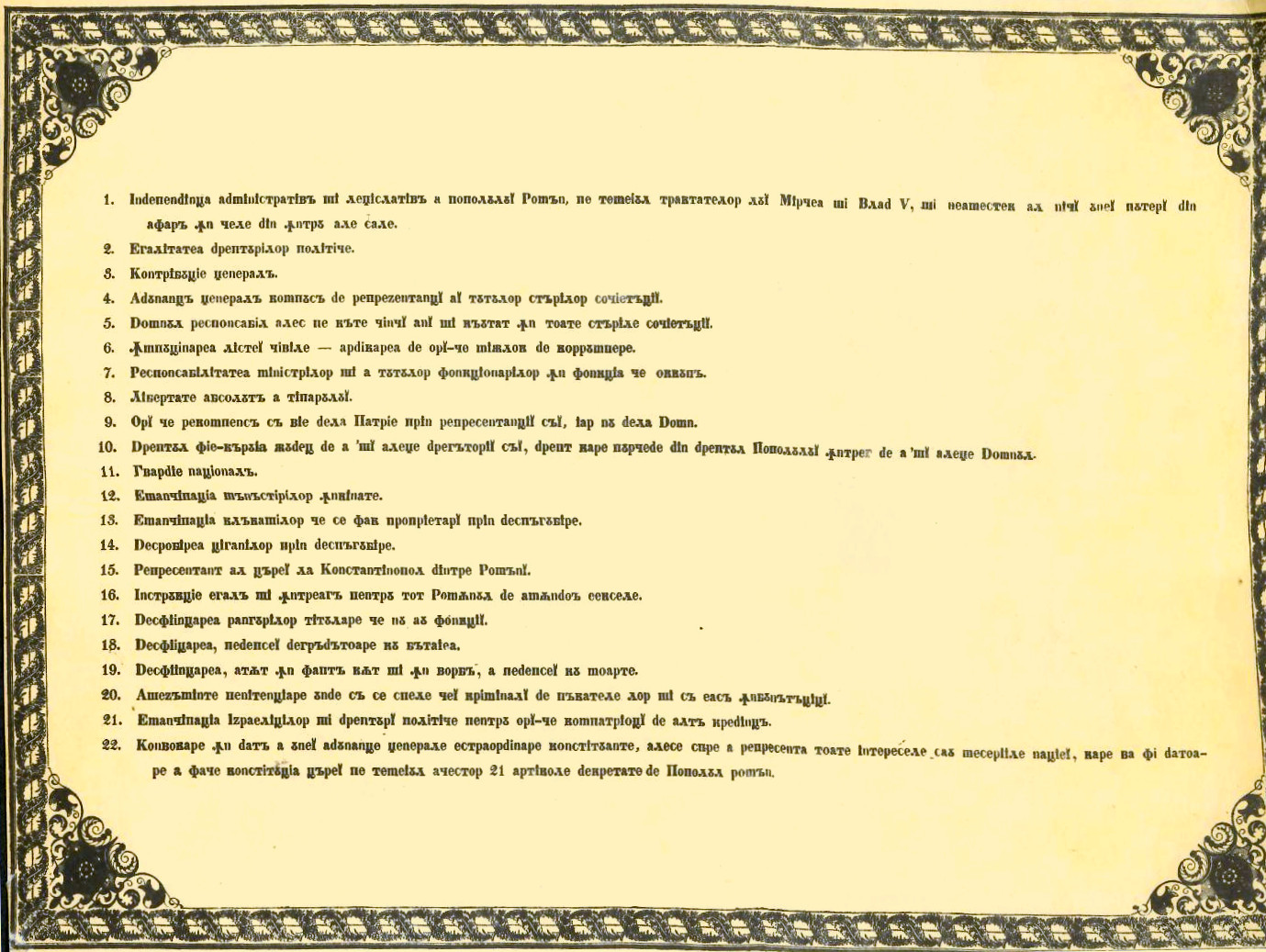
The 1849 Proclamation of Islaz written in the Romanian transitional alphabet.

The Proclamation of Islaz (Romanian: Proclamația de la Islaz) was the program adopted on 9 June 1848 by Romanian revolutionaries during the Wallachian Revolution of 1848. It was written by Ion Heliade Rădulescu and publicly read at the small port town of Islaz in southern Wallachia. On 11 June, under pressure from the masses, Domnitor Gheorghe Bibescu was forced to accept the terms of the proclamation and recognise the provisional revolutionary government.

== Provisions ==
The Proclamation of Islaz has the form and value of a constitutional act. Between these 22 provisions are notably:

- The independence of the administration and legislature.
- Separation of powers.
- Equal rights of the people.
- The election of a responsible domnitor for a period of 5 years.
- Reduction of the civil lists of the domnitor.
- Emancipation of Jews and all other compatriots belonging to other rites.
- Emancipation of Gypsies.
- Equal instruction.
- Creation of a system of prisons.
- Creation of a national guard.

The location of Islaz (now in Teleorman County, then in Romanați County) was a small port on the Danube with some commercial significance, which, unlike the ports of Turnu Măgurele, Giurgiu and Calafat, was not under the direct control of the Turks.
