= Ion Ghica =

Romanian statesman, mathematician, diplomat and politician (1816–1897)

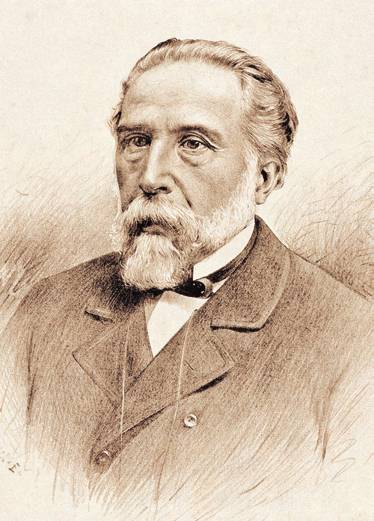

5th Prime Minister of Romania
- In office 11 February 1866 – 10 May 1866
- Monarch: Carol I
- Preceded by: Nicolae Kretzulescu
- Succeeded by: Lascăr Catargiu
- In office 15 July 1866 – 21 February 1867
- Monarch: Carol I
- Preceded by: Lascăr Catargiu
- Succeeded by: Constantin A. Kretzulescu
- In office 18 December 1870 – 11 March 1871
- Monarch: Carol I
- Preceded by: Manolache Costache Epureanu
- Succeeded by: Lascăr Catargiu

Prince of Samos
- In office 1854–1859
- Preceded by: Alexandros Kallimachis
- Succeeded by: Miltiadis Aristarchis

Personal details
- Born: 12 August 1816 Bucharest, Wallachia
- Died: 7 May 1897 (aged 80) Ghergani, Dâmbovița County, Kingdom of Romania
- Party: National Liberal Party
- Spouse: Alexandrina Mavros
- Relatives: Pantazi Ghica
- Education: Mines Paris – PSL
- Profession: Statesman; diplomat; matematician; politician

Ion Ghica (Romanian pronunciation: [iˈon ˈɡika]; 24 August [O.S. 12 August] 1816 – 19 May [O.S. 7 May] 1897) was a Romanian statesman, mathematician, diplomat, and politician, who served as Prime Minister of Romania five times. He was a full member of the Romanian Academy and its president on several occasions (1876–1882, 1884–1887, 1890–1893, and 1894–1895). He was the older brother and associate of Pantazi Ghica, a prolific writer and politician.

== Early life and Revolution ==
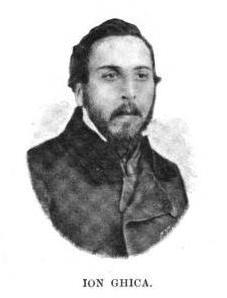

He was born in Bucharest, Wallachia, to the prominent Ghica boyar family, and was the nephew of both Grigore Alexandru Ghica (who was to become Prince of Wallachia in the 1840s and 1850s) and Ion Câmpineanu, a Carbonari-inspired radical. His father was Dimitrie (Tache) Ghica and his mother – Maria née Câmpineanu. Ion Ghica was educated in Bucharest and in Western Europe, studying engineering and mathematics in Mine School of Paris (France) from 1837 to 1840.

After finishing his studies in Paris, he left for Moldavia and was involved in the failed Frăția ("Brotherhood") conspiracy of 1848, which was intended to bring about the union of Wallachia and Moldavia under one native Romanian leader, Prince Mihai Sturdza. Ion Ghica became a professor on geology and mineralogy and later professor on political economy at the Academia Mihăileană which was founded by the same Prince Sturdza in Iași (future University of Iași). He is considered the first great Romanian economist.

He joined the Wallachian revolutionary camp, and, in the name of the Provisional Government then established in Bucharest, went to Istanbul to approach the Ottoman Imperial government; he, Nicolae Bălcescu, and General Gheorghe Magheru were instrumental in mediating negotiations between the Transylvanian Romanian leader Avram Iancu and the Hungarian Revolutionary government of Lajos Kossuth.

== Prince of Samos ==
While in Istanbul, he was appointed Bey (governor) of Samos (1854–1859), where he proved his leadership skills by extirpating local piracy (most of which was aimed at transports supplying the Crimean War). After completing the task, Ghica was awarded the honorary title of Bey of Samos by Sultan Abd-ul-Mejid I in 1856.

== Political career in Romania ==
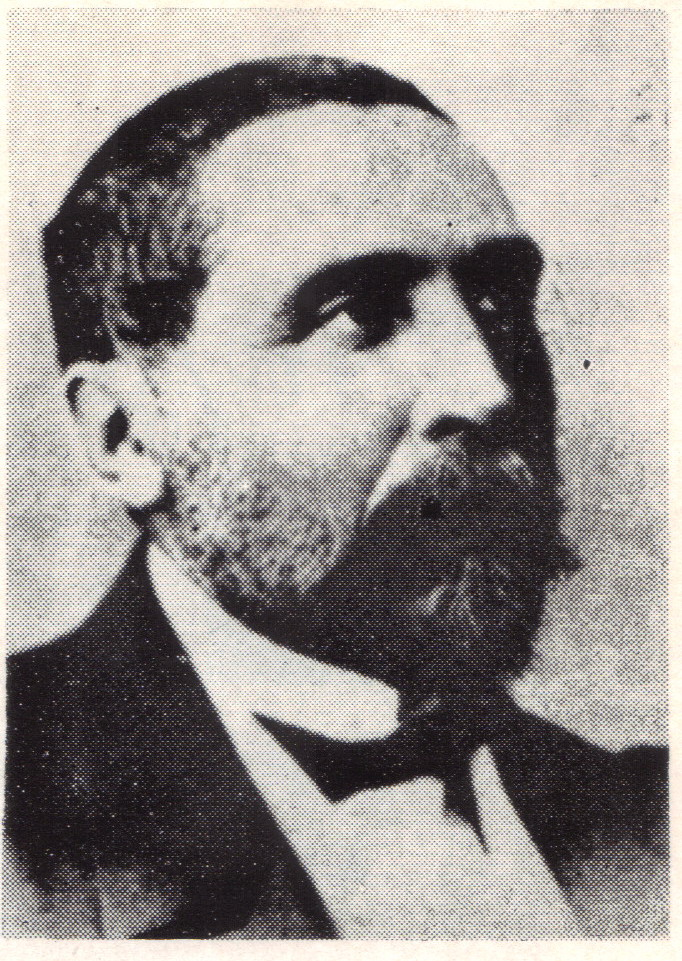

In 1859, after the union of Moldavia and Walachia had been effected, Prince Alexandru Ioan Cuza asked Ion Ghica to return. Later (1866), despite being trusted by Prince Cuza, Ghica took active part in the secret grouping that secured Cuza's overthrow. He was the first prime minister under Prince of Romania (afterwards King of Romania) Carol of Hohenzollern.

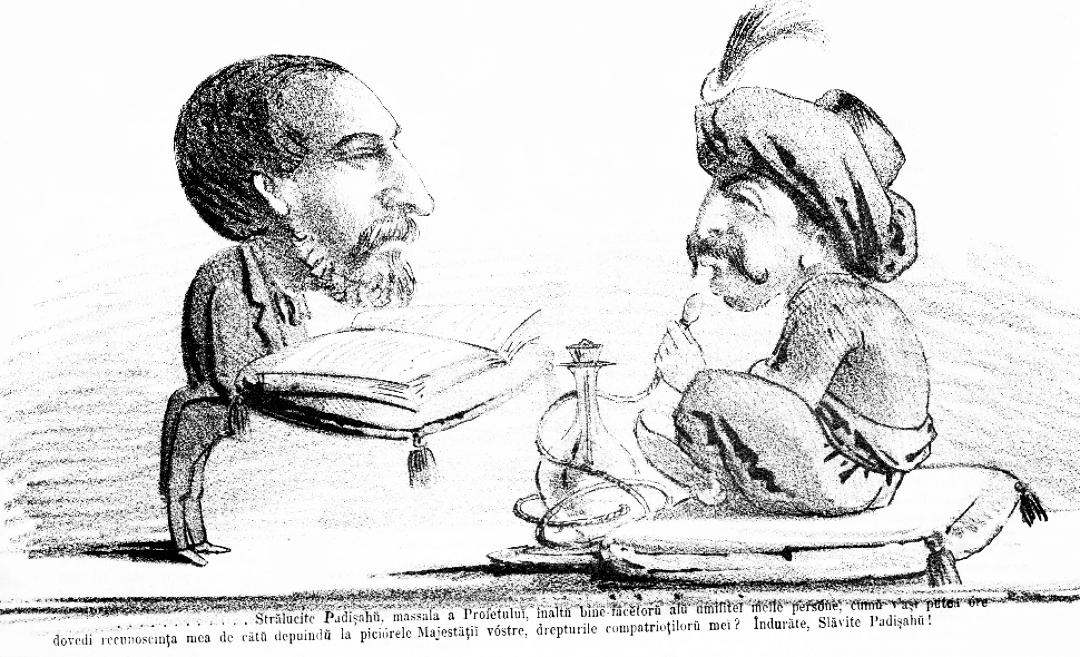
Caricature in the Ghimpele magazine, 25 September 1866, showing the former Bey of Samos bowing to Romania's Ottoman suzerain Abdulaziz, saying: "O enlightened padishah, mashallah of the Prophet, great benefactor of my humble self, how could I show you my gratitude if not by deposing my compatriots' rights at your Majesty's feet? Have mercy, my Exalted Padishah!"

In 1866, Ghica became the first chairman of the newly established Bank of Romania. He is also noted as one of the first major Liberal figures in the Kingdom of Romania, and one of the leaders of the incipient Liberal Party. His group's radicalism, with its boyar leadership that had engineered the defunct Revolution, surfaced as republicanism whenever Carol approached the Conservatives; Ghica joined the anti-dynastic movement of 1870–1871 that had surfaced with the Republic of Ploiești. The matter of the Liberals' loyalty was ultimately settled 1876, with the exceptionally long Liberal Ministry of Ion Brătianu. In 1881, Ghica was appointed Romanian Minister in London, an office he retained until 1889; he died in Ghergani, Dâmbovița County.

Furthermore, Ghica was a member of the Macedo-Romanian Cultural Society.

== Works ==
Beside his political distinction, Ion Ghica earned a literary reputation by writing his Letters, addressed to Vasile Alecsandri, his lifelong friend. Conceived and written during his residency in London, the letters depict the ancestral stage of Romanian society, as it appeared to be fading away.

He was also the author of Amintiri din pribegie ("Recollections from Exile"), in 1848, and of Convorbiri Economice ("Conversations on Economics"), dealing with major economic issues. He was the first to advocate the favoring of local initiatives over foreign investments in industry and commerce – to a certain extent, this took the form of protectionism (a characteristic of the Liberal Party throughout the coming period, and until World War II).

== Footnotes ==
Political offices
Preceded by Alexandros Kallimachis	Prince of Samos; 1854–1859	Succeeded by Miltiadis Aristarchis
Preceded by Vasile Sturdza	Prime Minister of Romania; Moldovan Government; March 8, 1859 – April 27, 1859	Succeeded by Manolache Costache Epureanu
Preceded by Nicolae Kretzulescu	Prime Minister of Romania; Wallachian Government; October 11, 1859 – May 28, 1860	Succeeded by Nicolae Golescu
Preceded by Nicolae Kretzulescu	Prime Minister of Romania; February 11, 1866 – May 10, 1866	Succeeded by Lascăr Catargiu
Preceded by Lascăr Catargiu	Prime Minister of Romania; July 15, 1866 – February 21, 1867	Succeeded by Constantin A. Kretzulescu
Preceded by Manolache Costache Epureanu	Prime Minister of Romania; December 18, 1870 – March 11, 1871	Succeeded by Lascăr Catargiu
