= Nicolae Bălcescu =

Romanian journalist and historian (1819–1852)

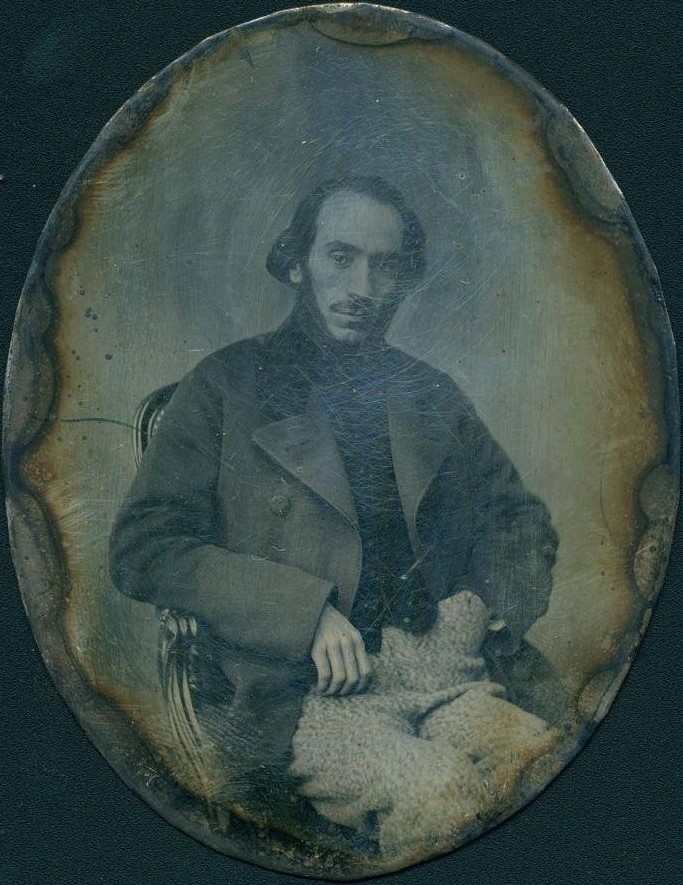
- Born: Nicolae Petrescu; 29 June 1819; Bucharest, Principality of Wallachia (now in Romania)
- Died: 29 November 1852 (aged 33); Palermo, Kingdom of the Two Sicilies (now in Italy)
- Organization(s): Frăția, 1848 Wallachian Provisional Government

Nicolae Bălcescu (Romanian pronunciation: [nikoˈla.e bəlˈt͡ʃesku]) (29 June 1819 – 29 November 1852) was a Romanian Wallachian soldier, historian, journalist, and leader of the 1848 Wallachian Revolution.

== Early life ==
Born in Bucharest to a family of low-ranking nobility, he used his mother's maiden name, in place of his father's name, Petrescu (his mother was originally from Bălcești, Vâlcea County now, then Argeș County). His siblings were Costache, Barbu, Sevasta and Marghioala, and his father died in 1824.

As a boy, Bălcescu studied at the Saint Sava College (from 1832), and was a passionate student of history. At the age of 17, he joined the Wallachian Army, and, in 1840, took part, alongside Eftimie Murgu and Cezar Bolliac, in Mitică Filipescu's conspiracy against Prince Alexandru II Ghica. The plot was uncovered, and Bălcescu was imprisoned in Mărgineni Monastery, where he remained for the following two years. The rough imprisonment conditions led to Bălcescu contracting tuberculosis, which left irreversible marks on health and led to his death.

Upon his release (after being granted a pardon by the new prince, Gheorghe Bibescu), he took part in forming a secret society drawn up from the Freemasonry and named Frăția ("The Brotherhood"), which he led together with Ion Ghica and Christian Tell (joined soon after by Gheorghe Magheru) in resistance against Prince Bibescu.

== Magazin istoric pentru Dacia and other early works ==
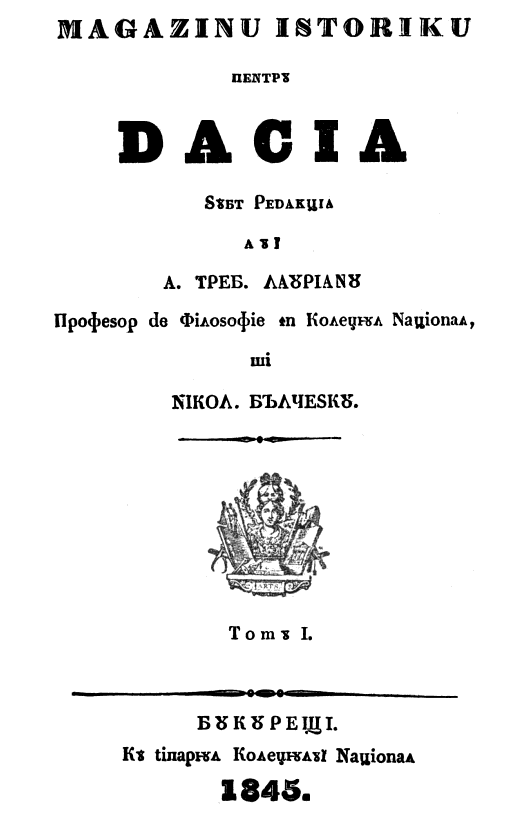
First page of Magazin istoric pentru Dacia, Volume I, 1845

In order to further his history studies, Bălcescu went to France and Italy, and was, together with August Treboniu Laurian, the editor of a magazine entitled Magazin istoric pentru Dacia, which was first published in 1844; that year also marked the publishing (in a different magazine) of his historical essay Puterea armată și arta militară de la întemeierea Prințipatului Valahiei și până acum ("The Military Strength and Art of Warfare from the Creation of the Wallachian Principality to This Day", which argued for a strong military as a guarantee of self-determination).

While in Paris (1846), he became leader of the Romantic nationalists and liberal-radical group Societatea studenților români (the Society of Romanian Students), which reunited Wallachians and Moldavians – it also included Ion Brătianu, Alexandru C. Golescu, Ion Ionescu de la Brad, C. A. Rosetti, and Mihail Kogălniceanu.

Magazin istoric went on to publish the very first collection of internal sources on the history of Wallachia and Moldavia – medieval chronicles which were afterwards published as a single volume. One of his contributions to the magazine singles him out as a radical liberal: Despre starea socială a muncitorilor plugari în Principatele Române în deosebite timpuri ("On the Social Status of the Ploughmen of the Romanian Principalities at Various Times") argues for a land reform, aimed at dispossessing the boyars of large plots of land (that would in turn be awarded to landless peasants); it was used as reference by Karl Marx in his succinct analysis of the events, a fact which was to earn Bălcescu credentials in Communist Romania.

== Wallachian Revolution ==
In 1848, after taking part in the uprising in France, Bălcescu returned to Bucharest in order to take part in the 11 June revolution. He was, for just two days, both Minister and Secretary of State of the provisional government put in place by the revolutionaries. His advocacy of universal suffrage and land reform was not shared by many revolutionaries, and his group came into conflict with the traditional figures of authority – the Orthodox Metropolitan Neofit II, although head of the revolutionary government, opposed the reforms and ultimately conspired against the Revolution itself.

Bălcescu was arrested on 13 September that year by the authorities of the Ottoman Empire who had put an end to the Revolution; his relationship with the Ottomans was complicated by the fact that the radicals' strict opposition to Imperial Russia had made them reliable for the Porte – the Ottomans later allowed all participants in the events to take refuge in Istanbul, and thus avoid contact with the Russian troops sent over to assist the Ottoman presence. Bălcescu initially made his way to Transylvania, but was expelled by Habsburg authorities, who considered him a threat and an agitator of Romanian sentiment in that region.

== In Istanbul and Transylvania ==
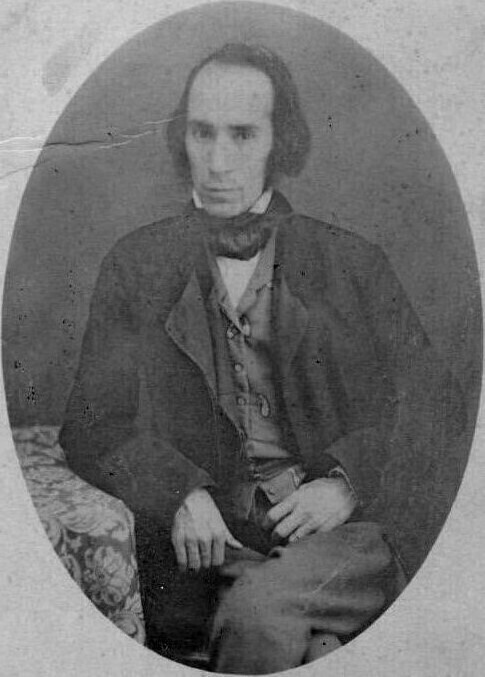
Nicolae Bălcescu cca. 1851

In early 1849, Bălcescu was in Istanbul when the Hungarian revolutionary armies under Józef Bem mounted a successful offensive against Habsburg forces and their Transylvanian Romanian allies. The Hungarian government of Lajos Kossuth then entered a debilitating war with Avram Iancu's Romanian guerrilla force, and the former members of the Wallachian government were approached by the Polish revolutionaries in exile, such as Henryk Dembiński, to mediate a peace between the two sides (in the hope that this was to ensure a stronger resistance to Russia, and counting on the Wallachian resentment towards the Saint Petersburg government).

Bălcescu left for Debrecen in May, and met with Kossuth to register the latter's offer to Iancu. Marxist-inspired historiography has celebrated this as an agreement; in fact, Bălcescu's papers reveal that he viewed the peace offering as unsatisfactory for Romanians, and that Avram Iancu rejected it altogether (while agreeing to a temporary armistice). The final offer from the Budapest leadership to Bălcescu and Iancu called for the Romanians to withdraw from Transylvania, as the region was turning into a battleground between Russia and the Hungarians. When this latter conflict drew to a close, the Romanians in Transylvania, although never particularly welcoming of the Russian presence, surrendered their weapons to the reinstated Habsburgs (Iancu's loyalty to the dynasty had been the subject of a parallel dispute between him and the Wallachians).

== Final years ==
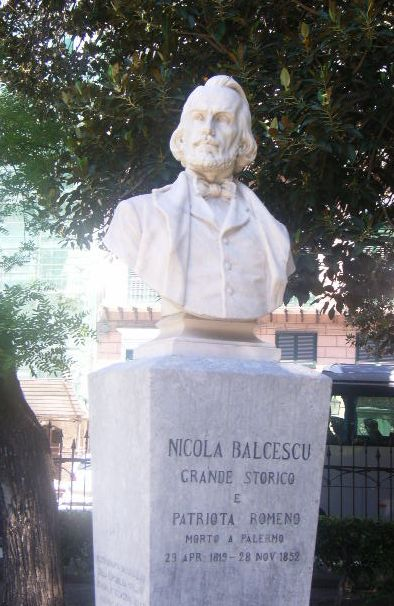
Bălcescu's bust in Palermo

Bălcescu's most important work is Românii supt Mihai-Voievod Viteazul ("Romanians under the Rule of Michael the Brave"), which he wrote in exile in 1849 – first published posthumously by Alexandru Odobescu in 1860. The volume is a history of Michael's campaigns, as the first moment when Wallachia, Transylvania, and Moldavia, came under a single, albeit brief rule. They show Bălcescu's commitment to both radicalism and nationalism, his view oscillating between praise of Michael's gestures and criticism of his stance as a supporter of serfdom and privilege.

His final years saw an intense publishing activity, including his study, written in French, Question économique des Principautés Danubiennes, as well as a collaboration with Adam Mickiewicz on La Tribune des Peuples. Stricken by tuberculosis, impoverished, and constantly moving between various locations in France and the Italian Peninsula, he died in Palermo (in the Two Sicilies) at 33 years of age. Bălcescu never married, though he and his lover Alexandra Florescu had a son, Bonifaciu Florescu (1848–1899), who became a professor of French language and literature.

== Nationalization of his properties ==
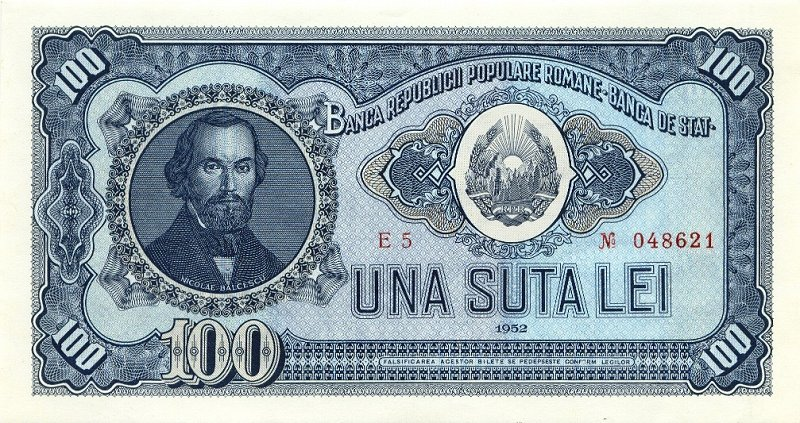
Nicolae Bălcescu on the 100 leu banknote, Communist Romania, 1952

In the present his properties remain nationalized by the Romanian Government 2011, after 1945, as Bălcesti Giltofani Land in Bălcești which in the present is Nicolae Bălcescu Museum, taken from Bălcescu's family member Radu Mandrea and Aristide Razu, in 1948 by a "donation act" towards the Communist Government, in Romania, in Vâlcea County.

Also his earthly remains, remain in Palermo, Italy, although the Communist Party of Romania tried to bring them back to Romania in 1970, to use them for communist propaganda. The Capuchin Monks in Palermo at the Capuchin Monastery, also known as Capuchin catacombs of Palermo, denied to the Romanian Communist Delegation of Historians access to the grave.
