= Românul =

Romanian newspaper

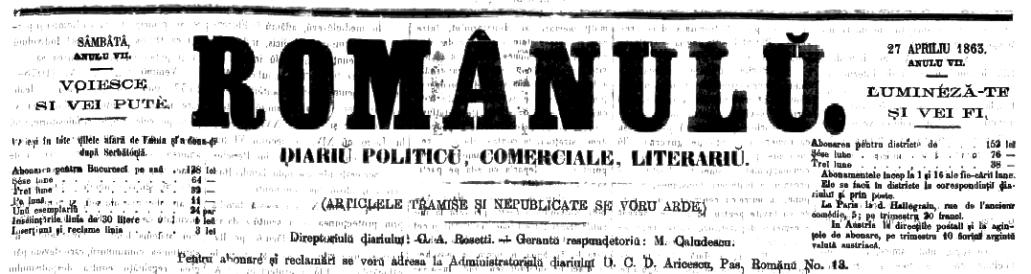

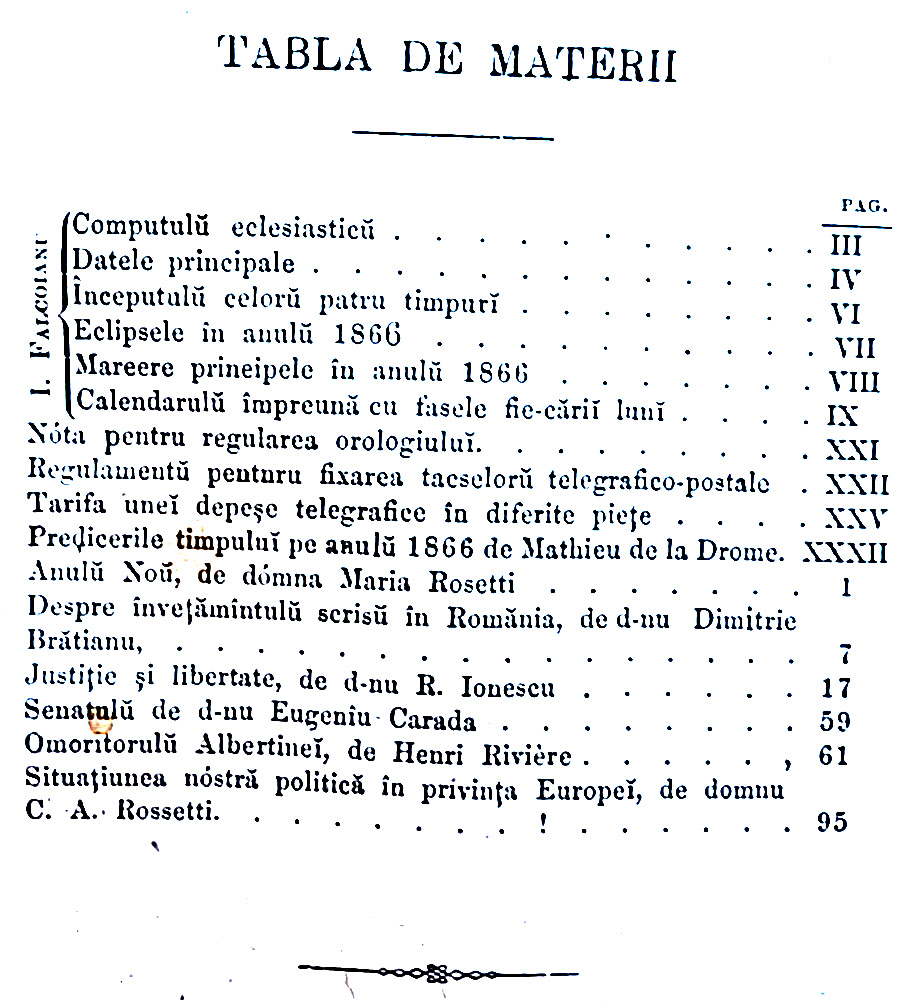
- Contents page of the Calendarulŭ Romanului almanac, 1866. Contributors: C. A. Rosetti, Maria Rosetti, Dimitrie Brătianu, Eugeniu Carada and Radu Ionescu (with Justiție și libertate)
- Type: political and literary weekly newspaper (daily 1859–1899; bimonthly 1901–1903)
- Founder: C. A. Rosetti
- Publisher: Vintilă Rosetti (last)
- Editor: Constantin Al. Ionescu-Caion (last)
- Founded: 1857
- Ceased publication: 1905
- Headquarters: Academiei Street 2, Bucharest
- OCLC number: 472699385

Românul (Romanian pronunciation: [roˈmɨnul], meaning "The Romanian"; originally spelled Romanulu or Românulŭ, also known as Romînul, Concordia, Libertatea and Consciinti'a Nationala), was a political and literary newspaper published in Bucharest, Romania, from 1857 to 1905. Established as the leading voice of Romanian liberalism (the "Red" faction) in the state of Wallachia, it had direct connections to the radical ideology of Western Europe. Its founder and director was the aristocrat C. A. Rosetti, known as Romantic poet, Masonic promoter and left-wing activist, seconded by the brothers Ion C. Brătianu and Dimitrie Brătianu. Românul's roots were planted in the 1848 revolutionary movement, whose press organ, Pruncul Român, was a direct predecessor.

In its first editions, Românul helped circulate the slogans of the national emancipation ideal, and campaigned for Moldavia to join Wallachia in a union of the principalities, the basis of modern Romania. Although that union was achieved in 1859, Rosetti fell out with the elected Domnitor Alexander John Cuza, censuring his dictatorial inclinations and being in turn censored. Românul men (Rosetti, Eugeniu Carada) helped topple Cuza in February 1866, after which Românul became the expression of radicalism in government. During the early rule of Domnitor Carol, it became noted for bellicose statements favoring the incorporation into Romania of Transylvania, Bukovina, and other regions held by the Austrian Empire; it also supported Romania's full independence from the Ottoman Empire, and the creation of "Red" paramilitary units. This agenda was taken up by Bogdan Petriceicu Hasdeu, Alexandru Odobescu, and various other Românul writers. Additionally, during brief periods of conflict with Carol, Românul supported republican agitation, most openly so in the troubled year 1870. Its inclinations toward ethnic nationalism and antisemitism were additional topics of controversy.

Românul men consolidated the "Red" opposition, creating the National Liberal Party (PNL), which dominated Romanian politics from 1875 onward. Românul gave enthusiastic backing to the Romanian War of Independence, but was not pleased by the establishment of the Romanian Kingdom. The Rosettists became the far left of PNL, and had socialist sympathies, being identified by the conservative opinion-makers (writers Titu Maiorescu, Mihai Eminescu and Ion Luca Caragiale) with excess, demagogy, or corruption. They also ridiculed Românul for its "macaronic" rendition of the Romanian language.

Românul unwittingly destabilized the PNL by proposing electoral and other reforms during the 1880s, and its leaders, Rosetti included, were pushed into leaving the party. In its final edition, put out by Vintilă Rosetti, the openly pro-socialist newspaper went into steady decline.

== History ==
=== Background and foundation ===
The Rosetti (Ruset) family, of Greek-Byzantine and Phanariote origin, joined the Moldo-Wallachian boyar class in the 17th century, experiencing supreme political power with the rise of Antonie Vodă (1675), and then with the arrival of Manolache-Giani Vodă (1770). The Românul founder was a collateral descendant of Antonie, and, despite being identified with Wallachia's liberal school, had a mainly Moldavian ancestry. By the time of his revolutionary debut, the various Rosetti branches populated the entire political landscape of the two principalities. Although born into this aristocratic milieu, Constantin Alexandru "C. A." Rosetti was a man of many trades (actor, translator, printer, shop-owner), a Byronian poet by vocation, and a self-confessed friend of the people. Already as a teenager, he joined the secretive boyar clubs which subverted the Regulamentul Organic regime, and expanded his circle of acquaintances while studying with fellow Romanian radicals at the Collège de France. Also then, he joined the Freemasonry's Athénée des Étrangers, becoming Masonic brothers with Ion C. and Dimitrie Brătianu, and with the Jewish revolutionary painter Constantin Daniel Rosenthal.

During the 1848 events, Rosetti and Ion Brătianu organized the tanners and the youth into a revolutionary force, toppling the Regulamentul rule. Briefly imprisoned, Rosetti became Bucharest Agha in just a couple of days, and was instrumental in combating counterrevolutionary activities. He was also among the negotiators who tried to reach a quick compromise with the Ottoman Empire, their liberal suzerain, against the wishes of Imperial Russia, their autocratic supervisor.

Between these assignments, he edited the revolution's first and main gazette, Pruncul Român ("The Romanian Infant"). Although short lived, it enshrined in popular memory the ethical and cultural commands of Wallachian pașoptism ("48-ism"). It is also commonly seen as a direct precursor of Românul.

Eventually, the Ottomans intervened in force against the Wallachian revolutionaries. After some mishaps, Rosetti joined his former government colleagues in their Western European exile. At that stage, he adopted the left-wing interpretation of revolutionary failure, proposing that, had land reform been enacted and peasants emancipated from corvées, the revolutionary government would have been legitimate and defended. He saw the future Romanian state as a republic, without "princes and boyars, without masters and servants, [...] without protectors and suzerains". At the time, Rosetti had found a new idol in Italy's radical ideologue Giuseppe Mazzini, reading and translating Mazzini's fraternal manifesto Alle popolazioni Rumene ("To the Romanian Peoples"). The Wallachian exile took to agnosticism, reading both the Bible and atheistic tracts, and refusing to baptize his children by Maria Rosetti-Grant. By then, Rosetti and his men were perceived as extremists even among the leftist Wallachian émigrés: Nicolae Bălcescu, a radical, complained that the Rosettists were "communists", and that their supposed critique of property as theft was irritatingly obstructionist.

The Crimean War (which placed Wallachia and Moldavia under direct supervision of the Great Powers) meant C. A. Rosetti and Ion Brătianu were allowed to return home. They both became involved with the "National Party", which campaigned for a Moldo-Wallachian Union. Românul was founded in this period of turmoil, when the National Party was slowly eroding the separatist vote in the ad-hoc Divans. Its first issue came out on 9 August 1857, barely a month after Rosetti had been invited back to Wallachia. According to one interpretation, Românul existed since February 1857, under the title Concordia ("Concord"), and changed it upon Rosetti's arrival to Bucharest. Românul was originally a weekly (twice a week: 1857–1858; thrice a week: 1858–1859), but became a daily in 1859.

The offices were originally located at No. 15 Caimatei Street. Românul then moved into the Pasagiul Român, renting flats from Rosetti's friend and upholsterer Peter Friedrich Bossel (a location later used by Rosetti for his enoteca). The newspaper would then move shop to Rosetti's house at No. 14 Doamnei Street, and eventually to No. 2 Academiei Street (by Calea Victoriei).

=== Struggle for union ===
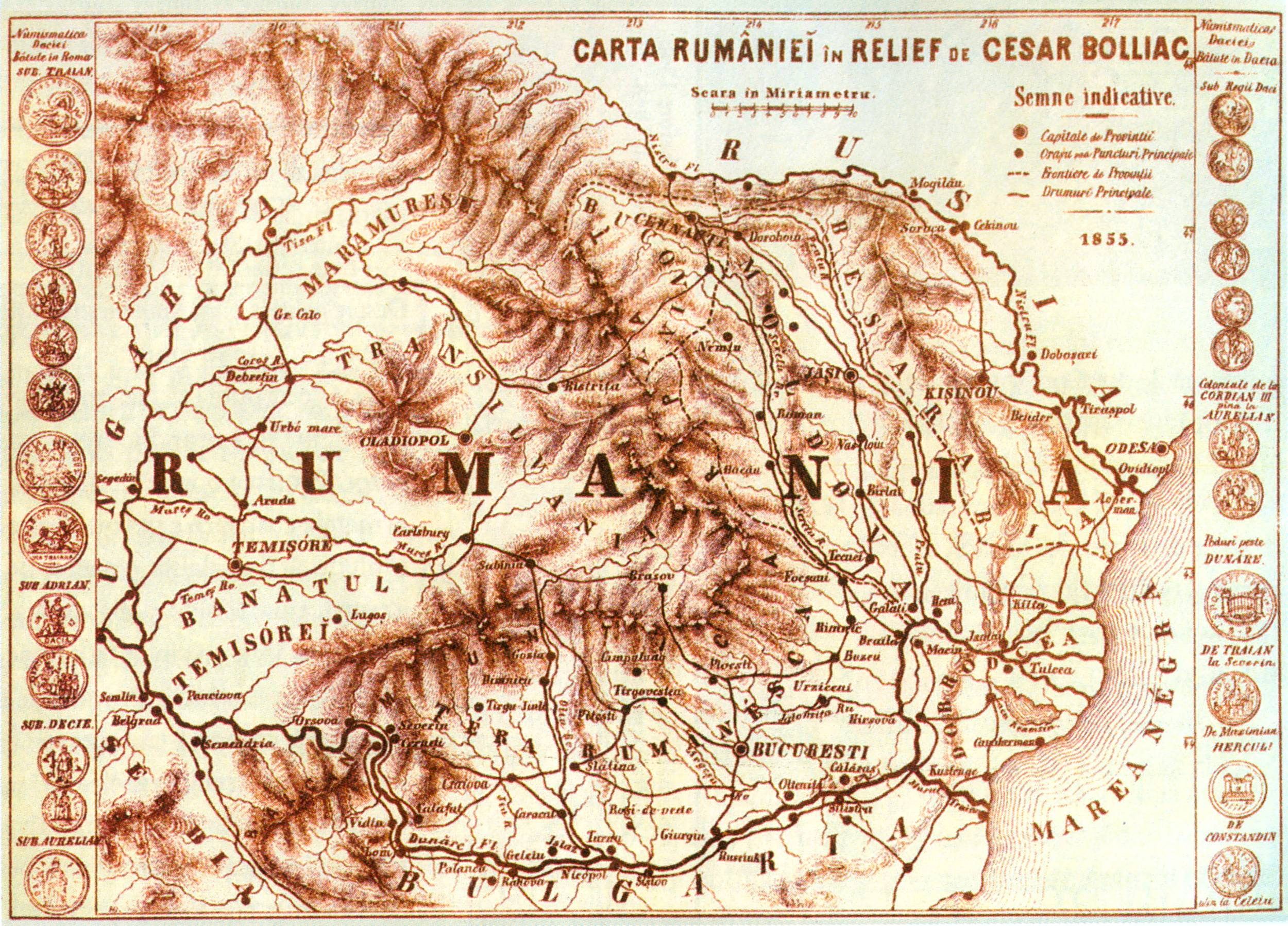
Romania (Rumânia) as described by Cezar Bolliac in the 1850s: the United Principalities, alongside Transylvania, Bukovina, Bessarabia etc.

In itself, the paper's definitive name showed the patriotic fervor of the 1850s, and especially the cause of Romanian nation-building, when the name "Romanian" slowly replaced references to "Moldavian", "Wallachian" etc. At the time, both sides of the National Party, "White" conservatives and "Red" liberals, were engaged in supporting the unionist project. From the start, the paper used the twin slogans Voesce (or Voiește) și vei putea; Luminează-te și vei fi ("Will It and You Shall Achieve; Enlighten Yourself and You Shall Become"). On one level, these mottos reflected Rosetti's belief in popular education by means of the press, but were actually coined by Ion Brătianu, and probably inspired to him by Masonic lore.

In its first manifesto, also conceived by Brătianu, the paper exhorted the Romanians of both countries to reflect on their shared lineage: "[the Romanians'] interests are identical, they had to suffer through the same things, and they have the same ideas about what they should do to make things better for themselves." Bibliographer Eugène Hatin notes that, together with the more moderate Naționalul, the "ultra-liberal" Rosettist tribune had "the greatest influence on those events which, in Romania, marked the years 1857 to 1859." Românul hosted contributions from the archeologist and political agitator Cezar Bolliac, who spoke out against the anti-Wallachian government of Moldavia. Bolliac attacked separatist Nicolae Vogoride for having shut down the unionist mouthpiece Steaua Dunării, and demanded freedom of the press. C. A. Rosetti himself was Secretary of the Bucharest ad-hoc Divan, which confirmed the new Moldavian prince Alexander John Cuza as prince of Wallachia. Rosetti then journeyed to Moldavia, as president of the delegation which informed Cuza that the personal union had been effected. He is also credited with having put together the "Red" contingency plan, that of a "revolution", had the Bucharest Divan opted not to elect Cuza.

Alongside the tightening of Cuza's union, Rosetti's cultural project involved agitation for international cooperation, for Pan-Latinism and Francophilia. In an 1857 editorial for Românul, Ion Brătianu presented the earliest "Red" take on the origin of the Romanians. In his view, the Romanian people belonged to three noble families: the Thracians were its roots; the Romans its political backbone; the Celts its intimate link with France. Românul also preserved a mythical image of C. A. Rosetti's Italian models. The newspaper's office was decorated with the portraits of Mazzini and Giuseppe Garibaldi. Years later, Garibaldi wrote to thank Rosetti for having regularly sent him issues of Românul.

There was a less transparent agenda followed by the Românul ideologues. According to Călinescu, Rosetti had adopted liberalism only because it conveyed his ideal of national independence, and, beneath the "extravagant and fanatical" liberal dogma, he was more of a "reactionary". During the struggle for union, Rosetti took a pragmatic approach. He was one of the party's envoys to the French Empire, and noted with satisfaction that Napoleon III "defends us like a fellow Romanian". Nevertheless, he stood against his increasingly nationalistic colleagues in the "Red" faction for always prioritizing popular sovereignty and majoritarianism over the supposed interests of the Romanian race.

Meanwhile, Românul itself experienced some pushes toward ethnic nationalism. In a later article, explaining his concept of a Roman racial and political legacy in modern-day life, Ion Brătianu came to the conclusion that democracy was innate to the Romanian psyche, but also subsumed to the other national characteristics. Just one year after Brătianu's praise of the Thracian-Roman-Celtic conglomerate, Bolliac used Românul to publicize his finds about the ancient Dacians, and his theory that the Romanian identity had very deep, non-Roman, roots.

The idea behind Rosetti's movement was a Left-Hegelian concept, paraphrased by literary historian George Călinescu as "God is revealed in nations", and inducing the notion of a united front against oppression. Early Rosettism was remarkably open to the social integration of Romanian Jews. In the age of liberal nationalism, Rosetti and Românul were condemning the spread of antisemitic violence and blood libel literature in Romania. The campaign, also taken up by Rosetti's political rival Ion Heliade Rădulescu, persuaded the Wallachian authorities to shut down an antisemitic gazette Praștia ("Slingshot").

=== Literary circle ===
With a primarily cultural agenda, Românul gathered around it a cosmopolitan and multicultural club. In its first year, it hosted one of the first serialized novels in Romanian literature, called Omul muntelui ("Man of the Mountain"). Signed by a "Lady L.", it was probably written by the Franco-Romanian Marie Boucher (who enlisted the help of Moldavian author V. A. Urechia). Two other women writers were noted contributors to Românul. One was Rosetti's Guernseyian wife Maria. The other was a Moldavian unionist, Sofia Cocea.

Românul also received contributions from Austrian E. "Iernescu" Winterhalder, the pioneer stenographer and co-owner of Rosetti's print shop. Winterhalder and Rosetti had already collaborated on an almanac of literature, which notably hosted some of the first works by the junior "48-ist" Alexandru Odobescu. In an 1859 piece for Românul, Winterhalder assured the reading public that Bucharest was fast becoming recognized for its Westernization efforts. Odobescu himself was a staff writer at Românul, where he published his historical novella on Mihnea cel Rău (October 1857), and then his friendly polemic with Rosetti, on the subject of dramaturgy. The Românul founder was twice manager of the National Theatre Bucharest, and, as such, published calls for the young boyars to sponsor the national repertoire, or chronicles of the plays staged by theater pioneer Matei Millo. Similar articles were later published in Românul by the actress and feminist Maria Flechtenmacher.

In May 1858, Românul published Sciarlatanul ("The Charlatan"), a story by the Wallachian novelist Alexandru Pelimon. Also in correspondence with the newspaper, the Aromanian Romantic poet Dimitrie Bolintineanu introduced the work of his disciple, Mihail Zamphirescu (August 1858), and complained about the disenfranchisement of Aromanian immigrants to Romania (March 1861). Românul played host to the Albano-Romanian aristocrat Dora d'Istria, being one of the first local periodicals to acknowledge her literary work (her text, L'Italia s'è fatta!, was published by Rosetti in December 1860).

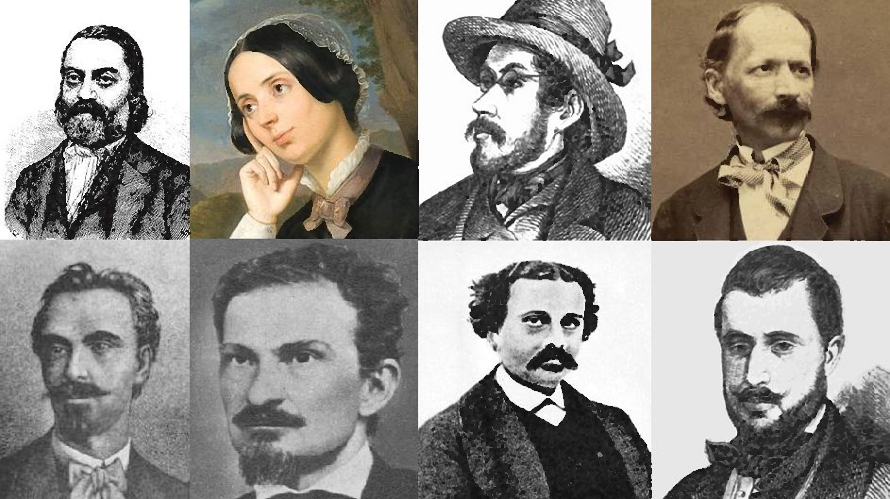
Some of Românul's original contributors. Top row, from left: C. A. Rosetti, M. Rosetti, Bolliac, Bolintineanu. Bottom row, from left: Nicoleanu, Aricescu, Odobescu, D. Brătianu

=== Conflict with Cuza: the early years ===
Just months after the union act, Rosetti fell out with Cuza: he called for faster and ampler structural reforms than those effected by the Domnitor's moderate government. Together with the political humorist N. T. Orășanu, he began issuing Țânțarul ("The Mosquito"). Purportedly the first ever Romanian satirical magazine, it was only in print until 15 August 1859. On 24 September, Cuza ordered Românul to be shut down, nominating it as one of the gazettes who had "forgotten the respect they owe to the powers that be"; the other was Nikipercea, a new satirical magazine put out by Orășanu. Among those who protested against this measure was a young liberal, Eugeniu Carada. Remarked by Rosetti, and recommended by Bolliac, Carada worked for Românul until 1871 (and was briefly engaged to Rosetti's daughter Libby).

Soon after, the newspaper was again in print, with Carada as editorial secretary, then editorial manager. His articles were a condemnation of censorship and arbitrariness, with slogans such as: "the greater the tyranny, the more violent the liberty." He and Rosetti reputedly wrote much of the newspaper together, and even worked on each other's articles. Such contributions were many times unsigned or pseudonymous, making it nearly impossible to determine authorship. In 1860, when Rosetti served as Minister of Education in the Wallachian government of Nicolae Golescu, Carada refused to fill in as Românul chief, considering himself unfit for the part.

Carada still took over much of the editorial activity, since the Românul founders were employed on other tasks, and participated in the debates on dramaturgy. He wrote suggestions about staging Hamlet (March 1861), and published condemnations of "immoral" shows at the National Theater. With Rosetti absent, he introduced new columns: a summary of foreign news; a Parliamentary column with a summary of political discussions; a section for cultural news and anecdotes; and a new selection of (usually modern French) serialized novels. In time, he began signing his contributions, including the political column once monopolized by Rosetti, and began using a milder and drier rhetoric, while defending Românul against accusations of frivolousness (specifically, those voiced by writer-politician Ion Ghica).

A historian, Constantin D. Aricescu, became the new director, having already served as Românul administrator since 1859. He had not previously been regarded as a journalist, since the custom of the day was to formally distinguish between writers and administrators. Also then, the writing staff was joined by Nicolae Nicoleanu, better known as a poet of the Romanian salons. Others were drawn in by Rosetti's criticism of the regime. Pantazi Ghica, the lawyer and Romantic author, published Orășanu's appeal from prison, addressed to the readers of Românul and Nikipercea, then opened a donation list for the anti-Cuza protesters arrested in Oltenia. Odobescu also returned with an open letter, claiming that Wallachia's government, under Manolache Costache Epureanu, was pressuring civil servants into voting "White". During 1861, Rosetti settled his scores with the leader of "48-ist" moderates, Heliade Rădulescu. The radicals' chief, who had helped marginalize Rădulescu since the 1850s, published a scathing satire by the Wallachian Romantic Grigore Alexandrescu, which showed a terrified Rădulescu choking on his envy.

In this new edition, Românul campaigned for the creation of a volunteer police force, the "Citizens' Guard", in support of the embryonic Romanian Army. In August 1862, it argued that such a Guard was urgently needed "to preserve obedience to the law, to keep and reaffirm public order and peace, to help the standing army in defending the country's borders, to preserve the country's autonomy and her territorial integrity". Rosetti held the military in high esteem, refusing to protect Aricescu when he was arrested for insulting the officers.

The attempts to forge an independent military were not well received by the Ottomans, who tried to impose a blockade on the arms trade. Although some weapons were confiscated in the process, Românul informed its readers that, with French assistance, many were still passing through. Românul, available to the Romanian intellectuals in Bessarabia (a Guberniya of the Russian Empire) at some 4 silver руб. per year, was read and censored by the Governor Mikhail Fonton de Verraillon before being made available to the Bessarabian public. By then, Rosetti was hosting pieces which announced projects of uniting the federated principalities with the other Romanian-inhabited provinces. In a letter for Românul, the Bessarabian-born scholar Bogdan Petriceicu Hasdeu claimed: "I was the first to raise a toast for fusing together all parts of the vast Romania."

Meanwhile, Rosetti and his supporters were scheming to depose the authoritarian Domnitor. Like many other liberals, they feared that Cuza was slowly doing away with Romania's two-party system, and monopolizing the application of reforms. In 1863, the newspaper inaugurated its practice of reviving republican rhetoric whenever a ruling monarch disagreed with Rosetti, although it also supported Cuza's replacement with a foreign prince. According to the Brașov paper Gazeta Transilvaniei, Românul was by then an organ of the "oligarchy" (comprising a "tightly democratic party" and a "boyar party"), backing Premier Nicolae Kretzulescu in his standoff with Cuza. At Buciumul gazette, Aricescu and Bolliac also turned against Românul, "the Oligarchy", and the "monstrous coalition", praising Cuza as the real democrat. Although it lost Aricescu, Românul employed Radu Ionescu, who had been imprisoned by Cuza and had feigned madness to get out, and I. C. Fundescu, who had fled from Bucharest to Moldavia in order to escape the monarch's wrath.

=== Conflict with Cuza: Polish affair of 1863 ===
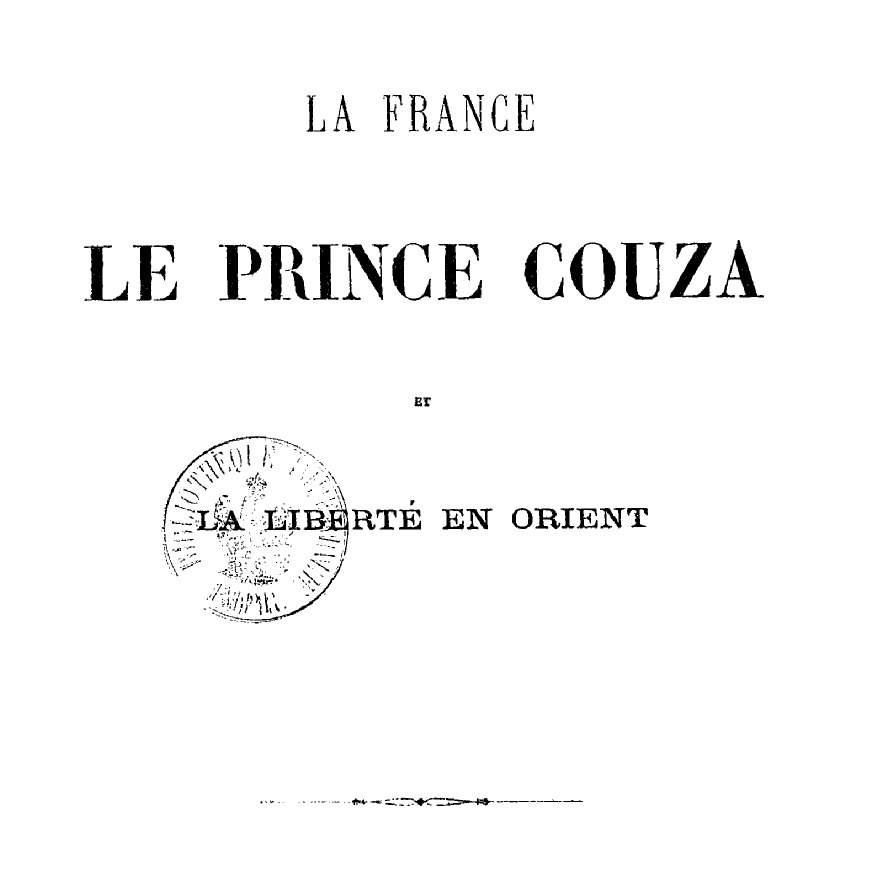
La France, le prince Couza et la liberté en Orient ("France, Prince Cuza and Liberty in the Orient"), 1864 propaganda pamphlet of the Romanian opposition, published in Paris

In late 1863, Carada was assigned to contact Europe's radical underground, gaining Mazzini's support for Cuza's ouster. Before leaving, he addressed an emotional letter of homage to Rosetti, Brătianu and others "form the great family that is the National Party", honoring them as his educators in matters of civic mindedness. At home, Rosetti began working with the Polish migrants, who came to the principalities in the wake of the January Uprising, and who were still determined to fight Russia. Românul men attended the "sublime ceremony" organized by Polish revolutionaries in Bărăția Church, and praised the Romanian legislators for setting aside funds to benefit the new arrivals (January 1864). As Russia called on Cuza to evict these expatriates, the Rosettists urged tolerance, dismissing rumors that the Romanian authorities would take their cue from Tsar Alexander.

Românul's friendship with the Poles alarmed the fellow "Red" Hasdeu. In Hasdeu's definition, the Poles were "a bunch of irresponsible people" whose revolutionary agenda clashed with popular opinion. Cuza's ultimate decision to banish the Polish diaspora committees, Hasdeu claimed, was prophylactic. In reply, the Rosettists added to their international propaganda campaign allegations that Cuza was a Russophile and a scheming illiberal. According to Rosetti and Românul, Cuza had betrayed his promise that "those who set their foot on Romanian soil are freed men".

From early 1864, once Cuza installed a personal regime in lieu of parliamentarism, Românul was explicitly in the political opposition. Rosetti's first editorial after Cuza's coup announced that, as a sign of protest, Românul would simply refuse to publish political news, and implied that a reign of terror had begun. Reportedly, this boycott irritated the government, keen to preserve the image of liberalism. Românul then returned to political news, with a letter from Rosetti's political ally, Ștefan Golescu, who claimed that he and his family were being harassed by the authorities. Afterwards, the newspaper openly attacked Cuza for changing the organic laws and for appealing to the nation. According to Gazeta Transilvaniei, it was losing popular support in the provinces, as many of those "who previously held [Românul] as their gospel" switched to the Cuza camp. Gazeta concluded that the Wallachian public was largely unprincipled, with the ideological worth of "watermelon flowers".

Although still plotting Cuza's ouster, Românul took a favorable view of the land reform enacted by the Domnitor, and acclaimed him for decreeing the secularization of monastery estates. The so-called "rural law", which granted monastery land to the peasants, was republished by Românul in 2,000 copies (about a third of the copies in circulation). The gazette also initiated a humanitarian campaign to help Bucharesters stricken by the June 1864 floods, and collected some 5,000 Ducats through public subscription.

On 25 July 1865, during troubles in the capital, Cuza again banned the Rosettist tribune. Just one day later, Rosetti produced the newspaper Libertatea ("Freedom"), which was in effect Românul under a new title. This edition was also banned by the Cuza regime, but, after only eight days, the newspaper reemerged as Consciinti'a Nationala ("National Conscience"). Italian observers received such news with concern: Nuova Antologia wrote that the "persecution" of liberal newspapers, and in particular the shutting down of "Romanulu, press organ of the democratic leader Mr. Rossetti [sic]", jeopardized Cuza's good reputation.

=== "Monstrous coalition" and Citizens' Guard ===
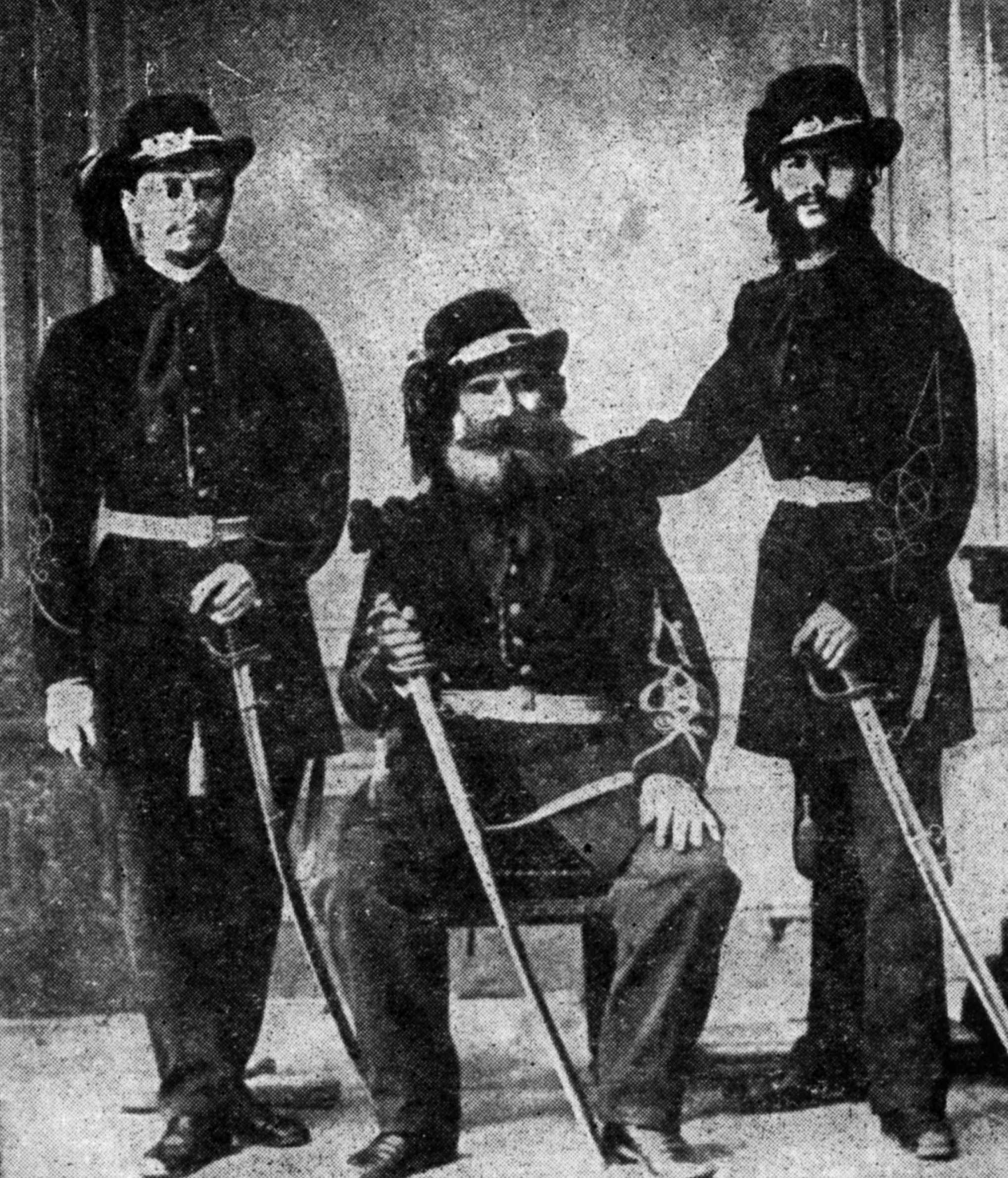
Personnel of the Citizens' Guard, photographed in 1866

Carada had by then made his way back to Bucharest, and was fast becoming one of the most anti-Cuza publicists. His Consciinti'a Nationala piece of 1 August 1865 claimed that the monarch's offer of universal suffrage was a sham, and that, in the 1864 election, "a flock of ignoramuses" had reconfirmed "a shameless dictator." Cuza retorted by arresting Rosetti, who was briefly held in a Bucharest prison, and by shutting down Consciinti'a Nationala. Românul had already warned its public that, due to the Polish affair, Russia was pressuring Cuza into censoring the press. It is probable that the Russian Consulate ordered the raid on the Românul offices, confiscating some issues of Rosetti's other periodical (Ecclesia) and the manuscript of a Bessarabian novel (Aglaie, probably written by Constantin Stamati-Ciurea). When it first seemed that Cuza's regime was going to clamp down on Consciinti'a Nationala, Carada decided to take full responsibility for his own agenda. Without handing in his resignation, he inaugurated his own, entirely anti-Cuza, gazette: Clopotul ("The Tocsin").

The radicals were active participants in the "monstrous coalition" coup that brought Cuza's downfall in February 1866. At the helm of a "Mazzinian" secret committee, C. A. Rosetti and his pupil Constantin Ciocârlan represented the leftist "Reds" in the conspiracy. They reputedly promised to lead the Bucharest populace into a show of support. When no one showed up for the rally, the other conspirators teased Rosetti with the question: "Where is that people of yours?" Românul, again in print when Cuza left the country, romanticized the events, referring to the coup's anniversary as "a holy day" in the Romanian calendar. According to a popular myth, Rosetti and Carada were the secret authors of the June 1866 Constitution, largely translated, in one night, from the Belgian model.

The triumvirate of regents appointed Rosetti the Romanian Minister of Education and Religious Affairs, in which capacity he instituted the Romanian Academic Society. Rumors circulated that the Minister had made strange efforts to democratize his institution, addressing his subordinates as "brothers", and introducing his circulaires with the Românul motto Luminează-te și vei fi. He resigned shortly after his Constitution passed the popular vote, allegedly because he did not enjoy being in power.

During the subsequent debates, Românul did not necessarily oppose the annulment of Cuza's universal suffrage, nor its replacement with census suffrage. The paper hosted some articles in which "A Subscriber" proposed to maintain in spirit Cuza's electoral reform, but his opinion had no discernible echoes. Writing for Rosetti's almanac (Calendarulŭ Romanului), but a conservative at heart, Radu Ionescu stated the case in his essay Justiție și libertate ("Justice and Freedom"). Ionescu argued that dividing the country into wealth-based electoral colleges was "the ultimate expression of democracy". However, he conditioned the reform's success on the thorough application of "electoral freedom".

By then, Rosetti had also been granted approval for his "Citizens' Guard". Legislation to this effect, passed in January 1864 and vetoed by Cuza, was enforced in March 1866. The new armed force, primarily a Rosettist and officially classless institution, comprised the petite bourgeoisie and skilled workers, most of whom were also subscribers to Românul. During April 1866, Românul reported about the intrigues of Moldavian separatists and Russophiles, who, under boyars Nicolae Roznovanu and Constantin A. Moruzi, attempted to provoke a quick breakup of the United Principalities. According to its account, the scandal, which ended in bloodshed, had been planted by Russia: "The complicity of the government in Saint Petersburg is self-evident; the enterprise of the Russian subject Moruzi, with his Phanariotes, his Lipovans and his other foreigners, has shown what sort of support Russia can expect to get from the Romanians of Iași!" In contrast, the Citizens' Guard was advertised by Românul as not just an instrument of public order, but also "the great, beautiful, liberal and national institution".

=== Radical governments and Hasdeu's Transylvanian agenda ===
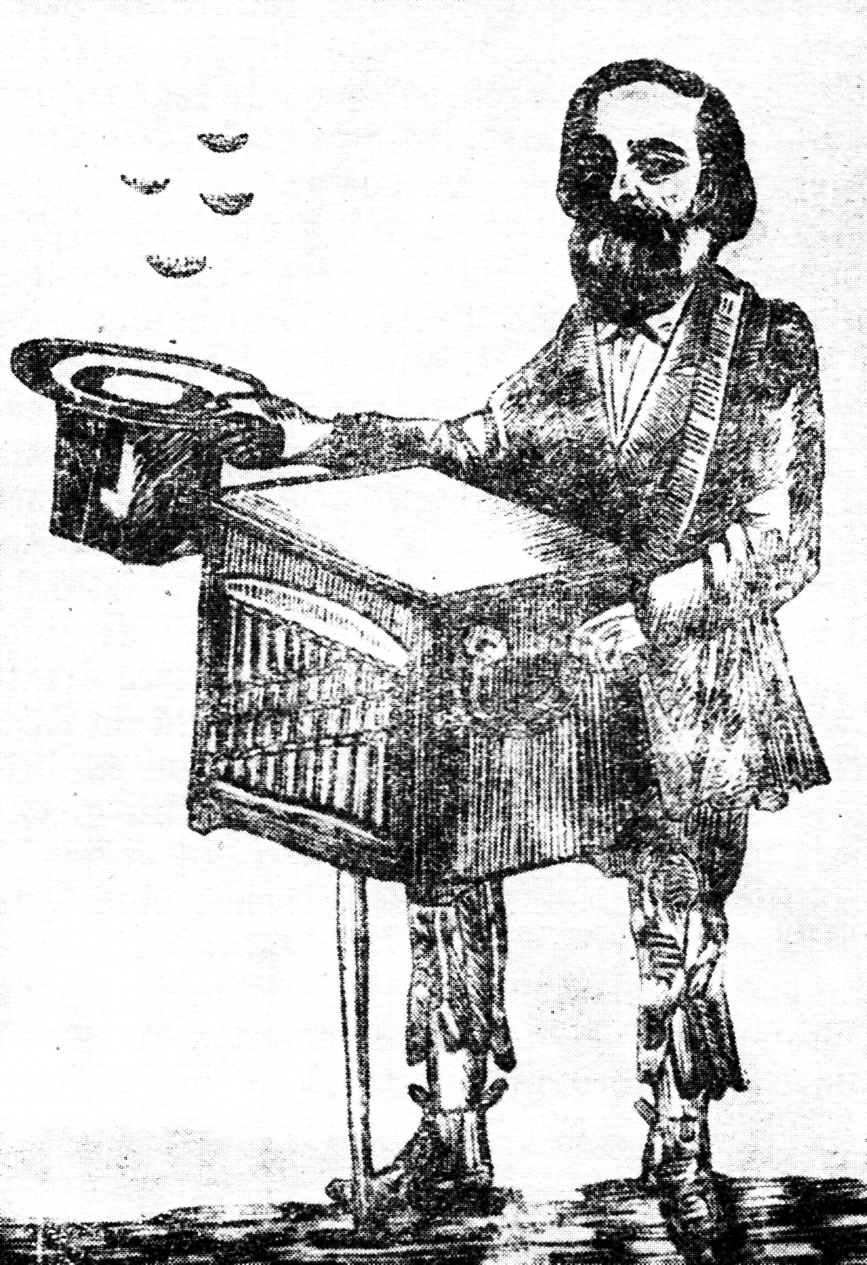
C. A. Rosetti as a busker, playing the tune of "Red" politics (anonymous pamphlet of 1867)

The period of instability ended when the liberal bloc agreed to back a foreign aristocrat for the position of Domnitor. The throne was ultimately accepted by a Hohenzollern-Sigmaringen prince, Carol I. The "Reds" were initially placated by the selection, but their discontent grew once Carol made "White" politics his own. For Carol, Rosetti was a suspicious figure on the "far left", or Haupt der extremen Radikalen ("Head of the extreme Radicals"). While the "White" camp became a Prussian party, the liberals oscillated between Francophilia and Russophilia. The Rosettists had a key position: they supported Russia whenever she promised emancipation to the Ottomans' Christian subjects, even at the risk of upsetting France (isolated as it was by the continental Great Powers).

Before and after the February coup, Rosetti's paper strongly supported the creation of a reformed Romanian Army, under General Gheorghe Magheru. Dimitrie Brătianu's columns suggested a volunteer defense force, comprising some 30,000 men. The newspaper hinted that the Army could switch to an offensive role for the cause of irredentism, referring to the toppling of Imperial Austrian rule over Romanian-inhabited Transylvania—as had been the case in Italy with Garibaldi's Redshirts. At the time, Romania also feared that Cuza's dethronement opened the way for a new Ottoman invasion. At his Românul office, Rosetti was contacted by Bulgarian revolutionary Ivan Kasabov, who represented the Internal Revolutionary Organization in the conspiracy against Ottoman rule. Rosetti, Carada and Ciocârlan were the Romanian contacts of the Bulgarian Central Committee, helping it prepare for an uprising in Rumelia, and transmitting its messages to Mazzini.

By summer 1866, Românul was in contact with a Moldavian-born adventurer, Titus Dunka, who had gained distinction as a Redshirt in the Third Italian War of Independence. Recommended to Rosetti by Garibaldi himself, Dunka arrived in Wallachia with his commander István Türr, enlisting local men for a projected anti-Austrian revolutionary army. These efforts blended with the creation of a Romanian volunteer army: in a letter to Românul, Dunka's father Ștefan offered his services as an officer; meanwhile, in Austrian Transylvania, a military invasion by Romania was being factored in as a likely scenario.

Between March 1867 and November 1868, Rosettist radicalism was the governing ideology of Romania, and Rosetti even continued to serve as Minister of Education and Religious Affairs. The three successive Rosettist "Red" cabinets passed legislation favoring the Citizens' Guard, and supplied it with arms bought at public auction. During this momentary "Red" triumph, Românul was joined by a former rival, Bogdan Petriceicu Hasdeu. Although he only contributed to Românul during that interval, he cemented the Rosettists' all-Romanian unionist agenda. Making frequent study trips to Transylvania (where Românul was available at 40 florins annually), Hasdeu wrote ideological articles against all forms of regionalism, praising the newly founded Academic Society as the vanguard of ethnic uniformity.

Românul's agenda was complimented by the satirical magazine Ghimpele, which vulgarized the "Red" interpretation of current events. Românul employed Hasdeu's friend and former Ghimpele contributor Gheorghe Dem Theodorescu, who stayed on as editor until 1874, and, as theater critic, Al. Lăzărescu-Laerțiu (who died in 1876).

In Românul, Hasdeu reiterated the major objective of "Red" nationalism: the integration of Transylvania. Distanced from the group, and acting as Romanian diplomatic agent in Pest, Radu Ionescu censured such projects: "People of influence do not take into account the annexation of Transylvania, as that would be very difficult for us, given [the region's] varied races". However, the Romanian community of Austria (and of Austria-Hungary from 1867) was quick to respond to this agenda. The Banat Romanian Iulian "Julianu" Grozescu, who visited Rosetti in Bucharest, argued that the Bucharest newspaper's "strength of character" was worthy "of the most civilized nations". The Transylvanian militant journalist George Bariț was a regular correspondent, reporting on the clashes of opinion between Romanians and Hungarians, and Ioniță Scipione Bădescu sent in for publishing some of his first poetic works.

=== Jewish naturalization scandal ===
The evident rapprochement between Prussia, Austria-Hungary and Russia was disappointing for Rosetti, but not so for I. Brătianu. There was a rift between the Românul liberals: Brătianu took the Prussian advise and opened channels of communication with Russia; in Românul, Rosetti cautioned that Russia was only after the Budjak area and the Danube Delta (an argument much like those advanced by "White" diplomacy). Meanwhile, Dunka also took his distance from Rosetti. He traveled to Odessa. where he paid a personal homage to Tsar Alexander.

In this setting, a major political scandal shook Romania. The Romanian establishment, internationally noted for its unwillingness to adopt Jewish emancipation, was being asked by the Western governments to naturalize its large Jewish community. As Minister, Rosetti was directly interested in the matter, and looked favorably on the naturalization project. Românul exchanged pleasantries with the Jewish community leaders during the Choral Temple inauguration, and its editor probably intervened in favor of the Wallachian Jewish communities. Rosetti's tolerance was noticed by an antisemitic lobby within "Red" liberalism, and in particular by Bolliac's Trompeta Carpaților gazette—in August 1866, it alleged that Rosetti, I. Brătianu and Românul were surrendering the country to the Alliance Israélite Universelle. In the end, Hasdeu's ideas on Jews and antisemitism also made it into the columns of Românul. His 1868 essay Istoria toleranțeĭ religióse în Romănia ("The History of Religious Toleration in Romania"), serialized by the "Red" paper, distinguished between three kinds of Judaism: the ancient religion—indifferent to the Romanians, "Spanish Judaism"—more positive than not, and "Polish Judaism"—entirely pernicious, exploitative.

Românul's ideological stance, and in particular its antisemitic position, were being reviewed with concern by the rival newspaper Térra, put out by the "Whites" Nicolae Moret Blaremberg and Petre P. Carp. The latter identified the Hasdeu–Rosetti enterprise of being a "Karkaleki newspaper", following in the footsteps of demagogic and mystifying journalism; it also ridiculed Hasdeu's opinions on politics, art and literature. For Carp, the time of "48-ist" glory had passed, and it fell on the "Whites" to begin "the more modest work of [national] consolidation". Térra accepted Jewish emancipation, condemned the renewed spread of antisemitic violence in the provinces, and accused the radical "Red" ministers, Ștefan Golescu and Ion Brătianu included, of being hypocrites.

By late 1868, the liberals' opposition to the status quo, and especially the toleration of Bulgarian revolutionaries on Romanian soil, generated an international scandal, and the radical cabinet of Nicolae Golescu was intimidated into relinquishing power; "Whites" leader Dimitrie Ghica took over the premiership. D. Ghica was also supported from abroad as a means to curb the antisemitic disturbances. Again in the opposition, Românul was eventually convinced to tone down its pro-Bulgarian activism, assuming the official government position and, according to Appleton's American Annual Cyclopædia, "exhort[ing] the inhabitants of Bulgaria to preserve tranquility."

Soon after, Românul backed the government's show of force against the Hungarian colony in Wallachia, applauding from the side as the Hungarian revolutionary journal, Hunnia, was forcefully shut down. Hunnia founder Ferenc Koós, who was ordered to leave Romania, later alleged that the Românul founder had personally warned him not to be too good a Hungarian patriot. However, Rosetti still inventoried cases of government abuse. In October 1869, Românul reported a Gendarme raid on Cuca-Măcăi village, during which several peasants were arbitrarily killed.

=== Franco-Prussian War and Strousberg Affair ===
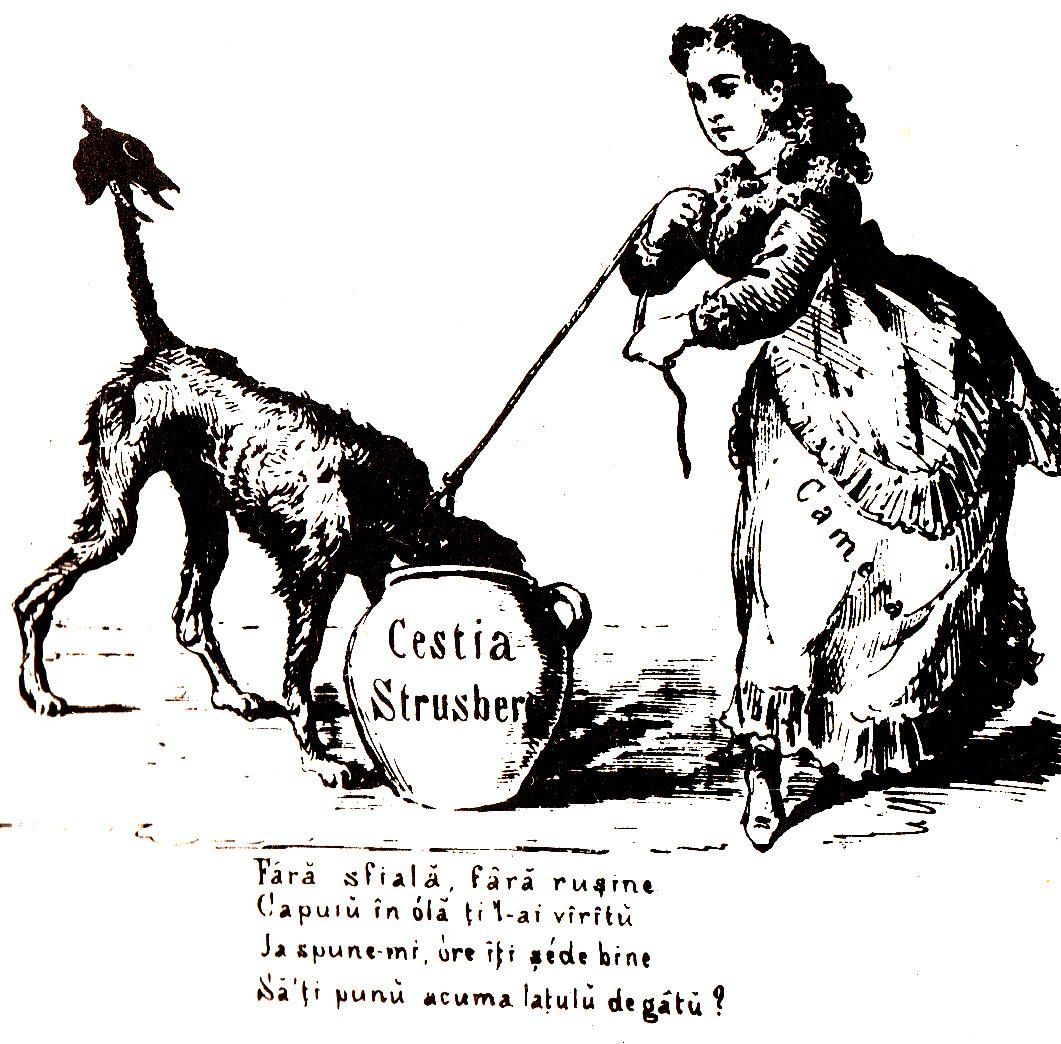
Cartoon in Ghimpele: a female figure, symbolizing the Lower Chamber, catches the Prussian hound with its head in the pot, marked "Strousberg Issue"

The year 1870 opened with a step toward national sovereignty, as Carol approved the creation of a national currency, the Romanian leu. Unlike Hasdeu's liberals, Românul and Trompeta Carpaților were supporters of the measure, although Carada made sanguine comments about the "feudal" coinage inscription ("Lord of the Romanians") and the conspicuous absence of senators from the royal ceremony. Titus Dunka, who had settled to a quiet life in Romania, became a correspondent of both Românul and Ghimpele. D. Bolintineanu returned with analytical articles on current events, writing until April 1870, when old age and disease incapacitated him.

Only months later, when the Franco-Prussian War erupted, Dunka volunteered to fight on the French side, and was also Rosetti's war reporter, before falling wounded outside Soissons. When news of the French Empire's ultimate defeat reached Romania, Românul commended the returning Romanians for having rendered "the most accurate and ardent expression" of Romania's love for "her older sister in the West". Rosetti himself left Romania to cover the French Republic's effort to resist Prussian attacks, interviewing Léon Gambetta and Garibaldi. The fall of Paris (28 January 1871) was a shock for Românul. News of this was published with the symbols of mourning, and introduced with the words: [h]oardele teutone calcă sacrul pământ ("Teutonic hordes are trampling upon hallowed ground"). In June, Românul announced that its founder was leaving Romania for a longer while, settling in Southern France with the intent of educating his children. He only returned in March 1871, having left the newspaper in Carada's care.

The conflict at home was exacerbated by the Strousberg Affair, revealing a direct Prussian involvement in the Romanian Railways project. The situation was rendered explosive by the mixture of republicanism, Francophilia and anti-German sentiment, intertwined with Dimitrie Brătianu's more utopian program: a Mazzinian world government. The commercial hub of Ploiești (or Ploeșcii) played home to a republican committee, taking its orders from D. Brătianu and the Rosettists. The club's leaders were poet Alexandru Sihleanu and military man Alexandru Candiano-Popescu. During the electoral battle of 1870, Sihleanu took up D. Brătianu's claim that Ploiești was the citadel of democracy, writing in Românul: "The patriotic and Romanian City of Ploeșcii takes the forefront; the City of Ploeșcii, the Paladin of citizens' virtues is the only one that has declared, at the top of its lungs, to Romania and to the entire world, that betrayal and perjury have lived past their lifetime; that such apparitions emerging from the strains of villainy must find their exploitation venue elsewhere; must seek their hanging spot at some other location". Arrested after publishing similar exhortations, Candiano was released following repeated protests by Sihleanu and Românul.

In December 1870, a large coalition, specifically directed against Carol's policies, propelled the Ion Ghica government, perceived by historians as "a ministry to liquidate the dynasty". Carol, who found that German support for his rule was not forthcoming (due to the Strousberg dispute), resorted to a publicity stunt, publishing an ultimatum-like defense of his principles in the Augsburger Allgemeine (afterwards translated by all Romanian newspapers). Moderate liberals such as Mihail Kogălniceanu were persuaded to rally with the cause of public order, and the Ion Ghica coalition was weakened.

=== "Republic of Ploiești" crisis and Putna festival ===
The anti-Carlist radicals were unrelenting, and, in August 1870, organized the "Republic of Ploiești" incident, in fact a halfhearted rebellion against the throne. It was largely prepared by Carada and Candiano-Popescu, but thought to have been actively encouraged by the liberal leaders. While Rosetti went into hiding to escape arrest, Carada taunted the authorities with a Românul article, publicizing his whereabouts and inviting them to drop in for a visit. Both of the editors were apprehended, and, together with Brătianu and the others, were subject to a mass trial in Târgoviște. They counsel was a fellow liberal, Nicolae Fleva, who claimed that the prosecutors were in fact working to silence Românul—his arguments convinced the tribunal, and all the republican conspirators were released in October 1870. In December, echoes of the movement were showing in Bucharest, where crowds gathered to protest against German pressures. Românul again expressed sympathy for the anti-Carlists, and alleged that the Domnitor's troops had used force in dealing with the protesters.

The Bucharest republicans were again rioting in March 1871. They managed to intimidate Carol, who was again on the verge of abdicating, but the "White" cabinet of Lascăr Catargiu regained the upper hand. Românul stood out for proclaiming Catargiu's rule to be unconstitutional, and for wrongly betting that a new "Red" coalition would depose it—I. Brătianu himself ended the disturbance by openly acknowledging that the Domnitor was entitled to curb the urban agitation. On 23 March, Rosetti's gazette severed its links with the other "Reds", rejecting Brătianu's pragmatic approach.

Meanwhile, Carada resigned from Rosetti's newspaper, dedicating himself to the study of economics. He was possibly disappointed by the hastiness of republican activists, and moving closer to the moderate "Reds". He was soon replaced by the Frenchman Frédéric Damé, a survivor of the Paris Commune. Better known as a dramatist (and plagiarist), Damé was for long employed by Rosetti as a Românul political columnist, and, in 1872, became the editorial secretary.

Românul journalists were again united in their criticism of Russian expansionism, and the newspaper claimed that Domnitor Carol was secretly negotiating the Budjak's cession to Russia; it also called for a better administrative and defense system in that region. The Rosettists were still focused on the unionist cause, but looked mainly to the Romanian-inhabited Austrian province of Bukovina. By July 1871, Românul was involved in the Bukovinian festivities at Putna Monastery, commemorating medieval hero Stephen the Great. When the Austrian administration made efforts to disperse the popular assembly, Românul reported with sarcasm: "it's as if the purpose of the reunion had been to reconquer Bukovina and overturn the precious [Austrian] empire".

=== Junimea and the "inebriation with words" ===
1872 and 1873 were problematic years for the Rosettists. Heading a consolidated "White" party, Premier Catargiu felt secure enough to disarm and reorganize the Citizens' Guard. The "Red" idol, Mazzini, died in March 1872. Românul hosted an obituary by Dimitrie Brătianu, who spoke with melancholy about the decades-long collaboration between the Italian and Romanian revolutionists. Rosetti also saw himself dragged in the conflict opposing the Transylvanian Romanian factions of Vincențiu Babeș and Alexandru Papiu Ilarian. Babeș denounced Românul for having published inflammatory articles against him, claiming that their pseudonymous author, Camiliu, was none other than Papiu Ilarian.

From 1873, the liberal cultural establishment found itself scrutinized by the "White" literary society Junimea. A Junimist founding figure, Iacob Negruzzi, had met the Românul group in the 1860s, and informed the conservative club that its members were bland-looking, that Rosetti was "sententious", and that the overall atmosphere was "deplorable". In his better known lampoons, Junimea founder Titu Maiorescu attacked the "Red" academics and novelists as dilettantes. According to Maiorescu, these figures had polluted the literary language (an "inebriation with words") and had excited the reading public with the most questionable information.

The "Red" intellectuals, many of whom were contributors to Revista Contimporană, opted to respond by means of Românul. In July 1873, it published defenses of Pantazi Ghica's novellas, including the author's own replies to Maiorescu gibes, and an encomium of Ghica by the young theater critic Ștefan Sihleanu. P. Ghica was subsequently the gossip columnist at Românul and Telegraful, stirring much animosity with his scathing remarks aimed at the conservative establishment. Also responding in Românul (and accused by Maiorescu of ignoring the issue) were V. A. Urechia, Dimitrie August Laurian and Petru Grădișteanu. In March 1874, Românul was publicizing reports made by author Nifon Bălășescu, according to whom there were 16 million Romanians (Aromanians) living in Ottoman territory. This account was highly exaggerated, and toned down for Junimea by the Aromanian activist Apostol Mărgărit.

A new member of the Românul staff was Constantin Dimitrescu-Severeanu, later a famous surgeon. During that time, the Rosettists also welcomed in their ranks the aspiring journalist Ion Luca Caragiale, later recognized as one of Romania's foremost humorists. Caragiale, a self-asserted Ploiești Republican who then recanted in embarrassment, acquired an intimate understanding of "Red" politicking before converting to "White" conservatism.

=== PNL establishment ===
The liberal and protectionist clubs were outraged when, in June 1875, Catargiu signed a trade agreement with Austria-Hungary. Against the "Red" program of industrialization, the "Whites" advocated an agricultural economy, and thus took little issue with unrestricted imports. This difference in policies was outlined in a Românul article by F. Damé. In parallel, Românul's stance regarding Hungarian activities in Transylvania was creating controversy over the border, and it was reportedly banned by local government the market town of Mehadia. Romanian Hungarian historian Hilda Hencz argues that Românul and Gazeta Transilvaniei forged "a monstrous image of Hungary and the Hungarians." The newspaper was actively promoting the patriotic cult of Wallachian prince Michael the Brave, noted for his conquest of Transylvania and Moldavia, and helped determine the ultimate location of his statue: University Square, downtown Bucharest. The Austro-Hungarian affair also amplified Românul's anti-Carlist rhetoric, more so after its old ally N. T. Orășanu was sacked from the civil service, for having subscribed to an anti-"White" petition.

With support from the anti-Austrian Englishman Stephen "Mazar Pașa" Lakeman, the liberals consolidated their loose alliance, creating the National Liberal Party (PNL). Rosetti and Ion Brătianu were the leaders of its radical wing, whose central tribune was Românul. Ion and Dimitrie Brătianu, together with young Caragiale, relocated to the main PNL-ist tribune, Alegătorul Liber ("The Enfranchised Voter"). For a while, Titus Dunka headed the PNL's central Moldavian bureau, and became noted for his highly combative stances.

The PNL's creation inaugurated a new stage in Românul's conflict with the "Whites". The dispute was political as well as cultural: the liberals strongly rejected the gradualist approach, regionalistic ethos, and Germanophile agenda of Junimea. In February 1876, the aspiring poetry critic Bonifaciu Florescu published a Românul article specifically aimed at the top representatives of Junimist literature, and in particular at the conservative rebel Mihai Eminescu. An advocate of pure Latin prosody, Florescu found Eminescu's looser style to be anathema.

Rosetti's newspaper was thereafter a direct rival of Timpul, the Junimist daily, and communicated with it through virulent lampoons. Later, with Eminescu as its political columnist, Timpul responded in kind, suggesting that, for all its patriotic credentials, Românul was a mouthpiece of "Phanariote" interests, only recently converted to the Romanian ways. Eminescu also delved into Damé's mysterious past, accusing him of having betrayed the Communards. Rosetti's new right-hand man, and editorial secretary, was PNL man Emil Costinescu, ridiculed by Eminescu for his lack of formal education. Costinescu's articles matched those of Eminescu in vehemence, and, for this reason, he was provoked to a duel, and injured, by the "White" officer Alexandru Blaremberg.

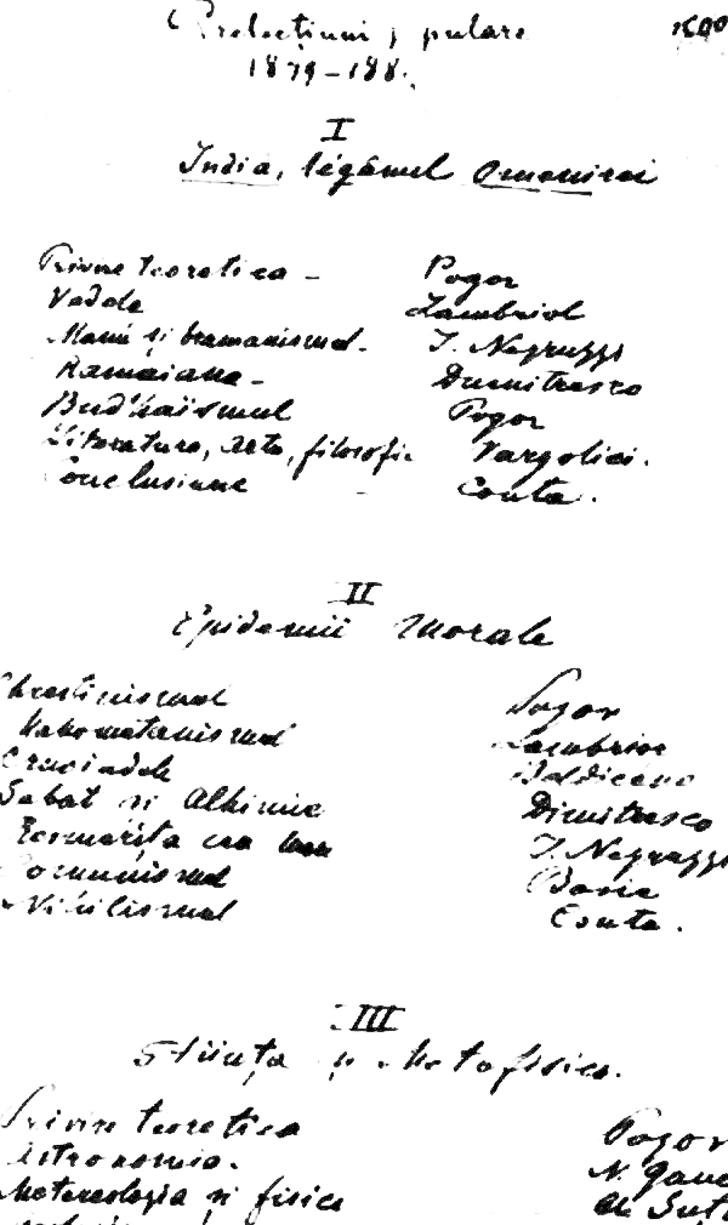
An 1879 program of the Junimea public lectures, discussing Christianity, Communism and Nihilism as "moral epidemics"

In March 1879, Eminescu's editorial noted: "Românul's low regard for us we treasure just as much as we appreciate the high regard of intelligent and decent men." According to literary historian Șerban Cioculescu, Eminescu's articles in Timpul, from 1877 to 1883, made constant references to Rosetti as the head of a PNL-ist political machine. In this context, Caragiale left the "Red" camp and was co-opted by Timpul, still hesitating between the Junimists and the moderate National Liberals.

Disorder was again mounting in the country, especially since some of the National Liberals hinted that they were going to have Carol deposed and replaced with a local aristocrat, N. Dabija; faced with such threats, Carol yielded, and called on the PNL to assume government. When the PNL took power with Manolache Costache Epureanu as Premier, and then with I. Brătianu, the Rosettists experienced a moment of triumph. From 1875 to 1884, the radicals were virtually in control of the PNL. During 1876, the Citizens' Guard regained its operative autonomy and elected itself a "Red" officers' corps. The "White" newspapers, in particular Timpul and Pressa, were highly critical of this renewed campaign, describing it as a Jacobin conspiracy against the Domnitor.

=== Românul and the "Eastern Question" ===
In the 1876 suffrage, C. A. Rosetti was elected to the Lower Chamber of Parliament, representing Bucharest. He was subsequently voted in as Chamber President, one of the top elected positions in the Romanian state. Nevertheless, the mid-1870s announced Românul's transition from Rosettist radicalism to all-out socialism, which made converts in his own family. The eldest son, Mircea Rosetti, came of age as a "Communard", militant atheist, and Darwinist, introducing his brother Vintilă Jules to the newer anti-capitalist literature (What Is to Be Done?). Vintilă also followed his father's Masonic commitments, joining Pisa's Luce e progresso Lodge. In late 1875, Mircea, Vintilă and Horia Rosetti were all studying in France, where they all contributed to radicalizing the Romanian National Liberal youth. Together with Gheorghe Dem Theodorescu, Grigore Brătianu and economist Gogu Cantacuzino, they founded the economic nationalist bloc later known as "Romanian Democratic Union".

Thanks in large part to Mircea Rosetti, the Românul staff came to include Zamfir Arbore, the Russian nihilist and revolutionary anarchist, who soon after made Romania his new home. In February and March 1877, Timpul picked up on such dealings, accusing Românul and the Rosetti family of being in favor of revolutionary socialism and The International. At that stage, Românul was under a printing contract with the company of Dimitrie August Laurian, who soon deserted the liberal cause and, as editor of România Liberă, turned to Junimism.

Controversy over socialist ideas blended with alarming developments in what was then known as the "Eastern Question"—including a strain in Romania's relationship with its Ottoman sovereign. Already in 1875, Românul was one of the most openly anti-Ottoman Romanian gazettes, taking up the rebel cause in the Herzegovina troubles and subsequent Serbian–Ottoman War, and calling for Romania to improve its relationship with Russia. It was, however, concerned about the Russian ambitions in the Budjak, and still prophesied that Romania stood to lose that strategic area. From early 1877, when Romanians woke up to the news that the Ottoman Constitution regarded them as mere subjects of the Empire (Article 7), Românul styled itself the voice of "patriotic indignation", addressing letters of protest to Midhat Pasha, the Grand Vizier. Also then, the PNL founding figure "Mazar Pașa" Lakeman returned to Rosetti's gazette with an analytical essay, Armata teritorială față cu resursele țării ("The Territorial Army Faced with the Country's Resources").

Românul circulated rumors that a Romanian patrol was fired upon by the Turkish Army outside Giurgiu, this being an Ottoman pretext for a planned invasion of Romania; later, it commended the government's efforts to secure the border areas and ignore the Ottoman provocations. As reported by a French diplomat on 6 January of that year: "[Rosetti followed] his revolutionary instincts that excluded all 'prudence' and 'reserve' when he took up criticism of the Turks' Constitution in his newspaper's columns".

When, in April 1877, the Ottoman state showed its dislike for the London Protocol, Românul commented that the question of war had entered Europe's daily agenda. The campaign for Romania's political emancipation was taken up by Alexandru Odobescu. Returning to Românul as a political commentator, he linked the rejection of Ottoman rule to the very cause of progressivism. Odobescu's articles outlined a complex and personal vision, combining ideas about education in the national spirit with criticism of the neutralist position.

=== War of 1877 and Berlin Treaty ===
Just shortly before the Romanian War of Independence erupted within the larger Russo-Turkish conflict, Odobescu's articles launched the revolutionary slogan Piară acum dintre noi inimile codace! ("Perish the straggling hearts among us!"). From 27 April, the newspaper put out two issues a day: a noon edition, with unfiltered news from the Ottoman and Russian borders; an evening edition and news digest. Also then, it began an inventory of public donations for the Romanian troops.

Rosetti, seen by some as "the cabinet's true leader", was a visible figure among those legislators who proclaimed full independence from the Ottoman Empire (May 1877). By order of the Domnitor, he was also appointed Mayor of Bucharest. Once the Romanian Army was called in to help the Russians offensive into the Danube Vilayet, Românul closely followed the developments on the front, and hosted homages to the Romanian soldiers; Maria Rosetti looked after the wounded, while Vintilă and Horia volunteered for action. A French reporter, Apollo Mlochowski De Belina, believed that Românul was sensationalist, suggesting that some its claims about the Romanian military action were "Wallachian gasconades".

C. A. Rosetti was present at the meeting between Carol and Tsar Alexander, irritating the Russians with his speech about a liberation of the Levant, uttered just as a "Red" rally was being broken up elsewhere. Following victory in the Siege of Plevna, Rosetti again stirred controversy about the Citizens' Guard as a republican instrument, proclaiming that there was "an internal Plevna" still to be conquered. At around the same time, Românul suggested that the paramilitary units could survive the war, forming "an unwavering barrier against tyranny and despotism". Carried by a "literary boom", both Românul and Timpul became news sources for the Romanian community of Transylvania, their notices picked up by Telegraful Român, the influential Sibiu gazette. At around the same time, Teofil Frâncu, an educationist and anti-Hungarian militant from the Apuseni Mountains, took over a position on Rosetti's editorial board.

The Berlin Treaty confirmed the Rosettists' fears about Tsar Alexander, granting the Budjak to Russia, and awarding Northern Dobruja, in compensation, to Romania. Writing for Românul as the Powers renewed demands for a Jewish emancipation, Rosetti asserted that both Northern Dobruja and the acceptance of Jews were "injurious presents". Contrarily, in four consecutive articles, Odobescu advocated "the naturalization of the Israelites", describing the Romanians as traditionally tolerant people. The antisemites among the "Reds" conserved one victory: although pressured to emancipate the Jews, the PNL government created such subterfuges as to make emancipation unlikely. The game of wits between Romania and the West was openly acknowledged by Rosetti's press. On 25 December 1881, he commented in Românul: "Happily the Roumanians may now congratulate themselves on having solved, in favour of the nation, the most burning and dangerous question, and that, we can now own, in a way contrary to the manifest will of the Powers and to the very spirit of the Treaty of Berlin" (as quoted in 1903 by William Evans-Gordon).

Meanwhile, the war had brought back into focus the Aromanians of Macedonia (broadly defined). Dimitrie Brătianu, who sympathized with the Aromanian pressure groups in Bucharest, called on Romania to finance the Aromanian emancipation effort. In a Românul piece, he announced that: "The Romanians on the other side of the Danube know that they are Romanian, wish to remain Romanian and rely on our moral support when it comes to conserving their national identity. [...] There is no deed more worthy, more pleasing onto God, than that of extending our hands to those brothers of ours who are lacking in spiritual sustenance, of giving them the power to express their thoughts in the language of our parents."

Romania held its first election as an independent country during 1879. Rosetti's role in the campaign was important, since he controlled the PNL's electoral committee and, the "Whites" contended, tried his hand at electoral fraud. According to one account: "Following the war of independence, the civic guard became an instrument of political manipulation placed in liberal hands."

=== Romanian Kingdom and Rosettist dissidence ===
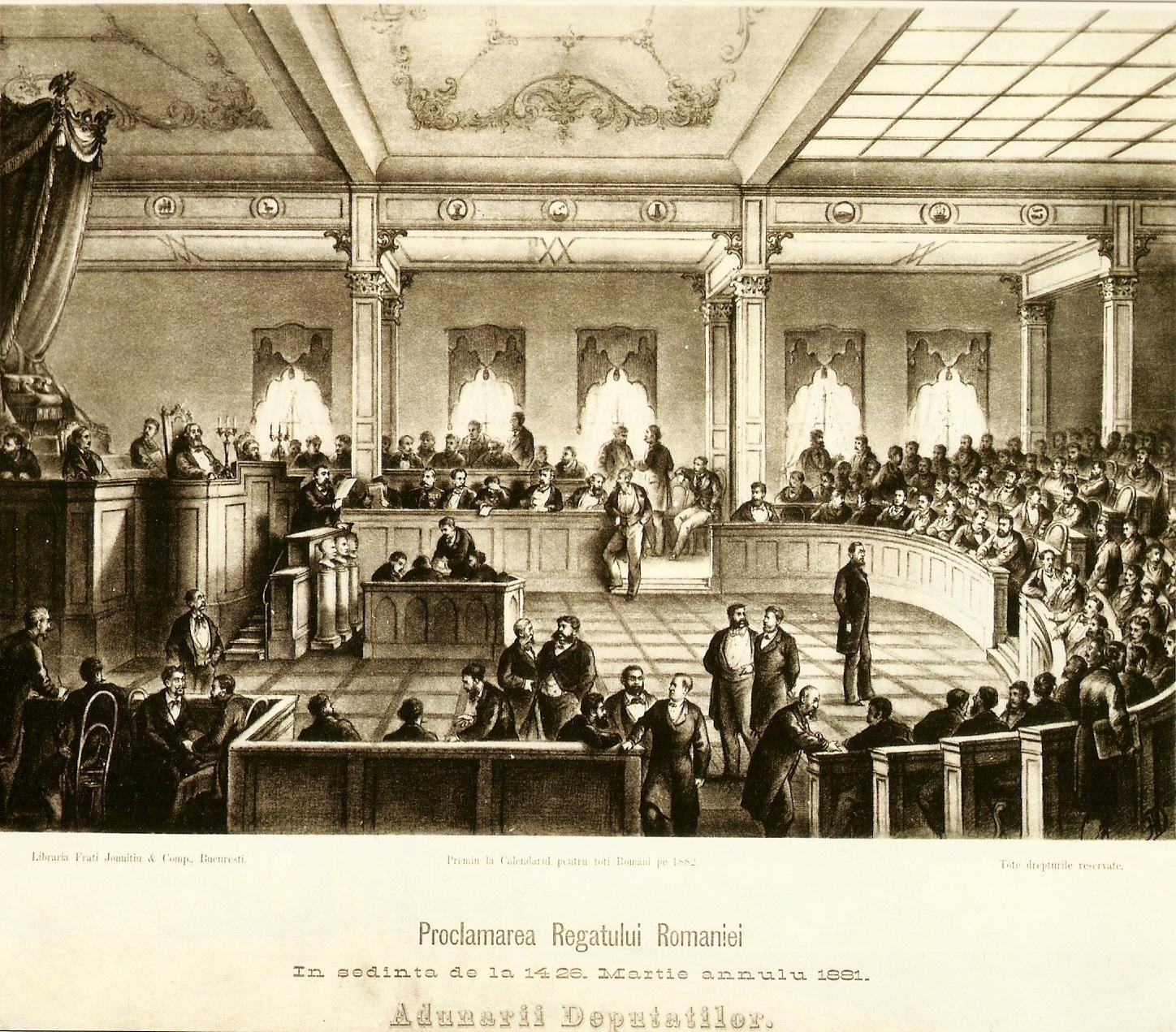
The Lower Chamber proclaims the Kingdom of Romania on 26 March 1881 (Jonnitiu & Comp. lithograph)

The anti-Austrian radicals were again suspected of being Russia's connection in Romania. On the first day of 1880, the Deutsche Revue published a polemical essay by Rosetti's lifelong rival, Maiorescu. Speaking for the entire "White" leadership, theJunimist doyen alleged that, after the Berlin Treaty, the Rosettists were essentially Romanian Russophiles. Together with the Russophile lobbyist Grigore M. Sturdza, Românul chided Maiorescu for insinuating that Romania's alliance with France was a disadvantageous complication—the resulting scandal created a rift between the Junimists and the other "White" clubs. Românul was sarcastic about the "White" effort to set up a monolithic Conservative Party, in answer to the PNL, noting that the resulting group was still divided into three factions.

Nevertheless, some channels of communication still existed between Românul and the Junimists. Moses Gaster, the Jewish scholar, Junimist sympathizer, and friend of Eminescu, wrote for Rosetti's paper during the late 1870s. A more vocal new arrival was critic, novelist and economist Nicolae Xenopol, who abandoned the Junimea cause to attack Eminescu directly, and who eventually took up a position as Românul editor (1882).

The debates on foreign policy prolonged themselves well after Ion Brătianu formed his new PNL government. This happened soon after Carol and the Conservative Party proclaimed the country to be the "Kingdom of Romania". By raising the issue of Russian involvement in Romania's politics, Maiorescu and the "White" establishment effectively pressured the mainstream PNL-ists into acknowledging this change of status.

C. A. Rosetti dissented. In his view, the Kingdom's proclamation was an awkward, barely constitutional, development. A special act confirming Carol's styling as "King", Românul proposed, was redundant, because the previous title "means sovereign, therefore not just Prince, but also King and Emperor". Embarrassed by the substance of Rosetti's remarks, Brătianu extended his hand to the Junimists, and, instead of a new land reform, promised to enrich the peasants through the rural capitalism of "agricultural bargains" (tocmeli agricole). Românul soon became the voice of Rosetti's one-man-opposition. Dismissed by the mainstream PNL-ists as melodramatic, Rosetti's paper announced: "Against this impotent and neurotic government, that has proven capable of committing all sorts of dastardly deeds, but, during all these years, has not been able to provide this country with anything worth her pride, that has stirred so many tears in the Romanian consciousness, but has not provoked a single minute of national enthusiasm, that is only capable of stuffing its own favorites and kick-starting its political machine at election time—against this government we must rise up, big and small, determined and unyielding." Through the voice of its new co-editor, I. C. Bibicescu, Românul warned that "Christian" Romania was on a downward demographic spiral. Sparking a press debate, Bibicescu noted the comparatively lower mortality rate of Romanian Jews, and suggested proto-eugenic measures such as a state-run "Committee on Hygiene".

Still, Românul participated in the effort to legitimize Ion C. Brătianu's prudent foreign policy: it republished a Daily Telegraph essay, which promised a return of the Budjak to those who maintained independence from Russia and did not provoke Austria-Hungary. Like all the liberal left, Românul had also renounced republicanism. Rosetti voted in favor of granting Carol a large demesne and, in his Românul articles, produced statements such as "the throne is an altar" (according to the anti-Rosettist observer Georges Bibesco, the 1848 revolution was thus nullified by its very instigators). The newspaper celebrated the Queen-Consort, Elisabeth (Carmen Sylva), as "a Poet, a Mother and a Queen", "the [world's] most beautiful light".

One major obstacle that I. Brătianu still faced was precisely the anarchist and socialist circle supported by Românul. Russia had conditioned the kingdom's recognition in exchange for a rapid repression of the "nihilists"; Brătianu reluctantly obeyed. On 19 March 1881, Românul quoted in full the premier's menacing statements, according to which the Russian refugees were "louts" and "vagabonds" who had overstayed their welcome. Also targeted by Românul, the Hungarian refugees of Bucharest kept an inventory of its insults. According to their Bukaresti Híradó paper, Rosetti's men had referred to the Hungarians as "vandals, savages, heartless, incapable of learning", and to their homeland as a "barbaric" country.

Românul was especially upset that Austria-Hungary conditioned Romania's access to the internationalized Danube system, equating Austrian policies with bullying and blackmail. Rosetti gave some backing to a Transylvanian nationalist league called Romanian Irredenta, or Carpathians Society, that militated for a "Daco-Romanian Empire", suggested overthrowing the King, and managed to attract in its ranks the Bukovina-born Eminescu. However, the radical leader's anti-Hungarianism was fluctuating, and he casually recognized the merits of Bukaresti Híradó publisher Lajos Vándory. In the end, the PNL and the newspaper also tolerated Austria's direct involvement on the Romanian stretch of the Danube. In his editorial, Rosetti wrote: "Those who can make justified and opportune concessions [Rosetti's italics] are often more securely set on their path than those who flaunt their daring and noisy opposition."

=== 1883 electoral reform ===
By August 1881, when it celebrated its 25th anniversary, Românul had reconciled with the Brătianu PNL-ists. Made Brătianu's Interior Minister, Rosetti even toasted to the Premier. The anniversary banquet, held at the National Theatre Bucharest, was a major affair: the building was donned in Românul memorabilia, and dinner was cooked by master chef Jean Babtisin Mars (including meals invented for the occasion, such as the Românul Salad). The PNL fissures were temporarily sealed, and Românul suggested that, given its reform program, "the future generations could never be grateful enough" to the reunified liberal party. The period was one of apparent prosperity. After the creation of the Bucharest Stock Exchange in 1882, Românul was hosting the stock quotes, as furnished by the Popp bankers of Hanul cu Tei. A twenty-year-old Take Ionescu, later known as political representative of the prosperous middle class, was during those years a reporter at Românul.

By then, despite the growing marginalization of Rosettist left-wingers, Românul was being popularly identified with Brătianu's program of state capitalism. This interval brought some of Eminescu's most violent attacks, which repeatedly suggest imprisoning, institutionalizing or even hanging the Rosettists, as "filibusters" or "parasites". Under Costinescu and Maiorescu, Românul and Junimea were again quarreling with each other on literary subjects. In a Românul article of February 1882, N. Xenopol stated the case for a revolution in Romanian letters, endorsing the literary realism of a dissident Junimist, Ioan Slavici; he also began a bitter dispute with Eminescu, which reverberated in the liberal newspapers. Amused by the wrongly attributed cultural references in Românul, Eminescu mocked its writers for not even mastering the opéra bouffe, let alone classical literature.

The Rosettists repeatedly tried, and failed, to push their new maximal political agenda, comprising: election reform, complete freedom of the press, independent magistrates and professional sub-prefects. The main objective, stated by Rosetti in his editorials, was to erase the electoral law and its constitutional basis. His rationale was that the legislators' oversight had rendered the electoral process entirely corrupt, always favoring the rich. Românul took up this campaign, proposing to merge the electoral colleges into one, thus doing away with the census suffrage. It also vehiculated its director's ideas about modifying the other sections of his own 1866 Constitution: renouncing the "Kingdom" title, fully incorporating Northern Dobruja, creating a legislative commission from legal specialists, and even disestablishing the Citizens' Guard. The notion of eliminating the 1st college, representing the country's elite, was attacked by the Conservatives as unsound; the PNL as a whole picked up on the proposal, arguing that "Romania's new social and political context" had elevated the standing of regular Romanian voters, but it still would not follow Rosetti on granting voting rights to all literate men.

C. A. Rosetti gave up his position as Interior Minister, and resigned his post in the Deputies' Chamber, astonished that the PNL was ignoring his main proposals. Having come under fire from his own party colleagues, who objected to his vehemence, he left the country, assigning leadership of his newspaper to Costinescu. When he returned in mid-1883, the PNL had been segmented into a ruling party and the anti-reform "United Opposition". The Rosettist deputies were vital for the Brătianu cabinet, and a compromise was reached between them: voting rights were extended to cover the urban and rural middle class; distinct colleges were preserved, but reconfigured. New-found monarchism, objections about the king's title, and the old cause of Romanianism were tied together in Rosetti's discourse. During a public function, he called Carol the "king of the Romanians", thus generating a new diplomatic freeze between Romania and Austria-Hungary.

Rosetti yielded in exchange for guarantees that the less wealthy voters be protected against intimidation, while Costinescu acknowledged that the radicals never had "a clear idea" of what reform they would propose. With their acquiescence, measures were also taken to prevent peasants from losing (or even trading) their plots, the Citizens' Guard was disestablished, and the Kingdom retained its full insignia. As leader of the "United Opposition", Dimitrie Brătianu had moved away from both his Românul comrades and his own brother, suggesting that the electoral reform was flawed, and seeking to increase the overall share of middle class voters; another dissident PNL-ist, George D. Vernescu, criticized the Românul proposals as all too populist.

During the late 1870s and early 1880s, Românul was still involved in the major cultural events. Damé was the main theater chronicler, noted for his coverage of Ernesto Rossi's Romanian tour (January 1878). He was later involved in a dispute with the fellow liberal poet and dramatist Alexandru Macedonski, exposing Macedonski's stage-writing as heavily indebted to Émile Augier.

In 1883, news broke out of Eminescu's rapid fall into mental illness, and Românul lost a rival. Macedonski being popularly identified as the author of an epigram celebrating the demise of "poet X". Agitated by Grigore Ventura, public opinion turned against Macedonski, who was left to defend himself by means of Românul (9 August 1883): "I do not feel I own anybody explanations as to the subjects of my epigrams, since my addressees are only designated with Xes".

=== Change of management ===
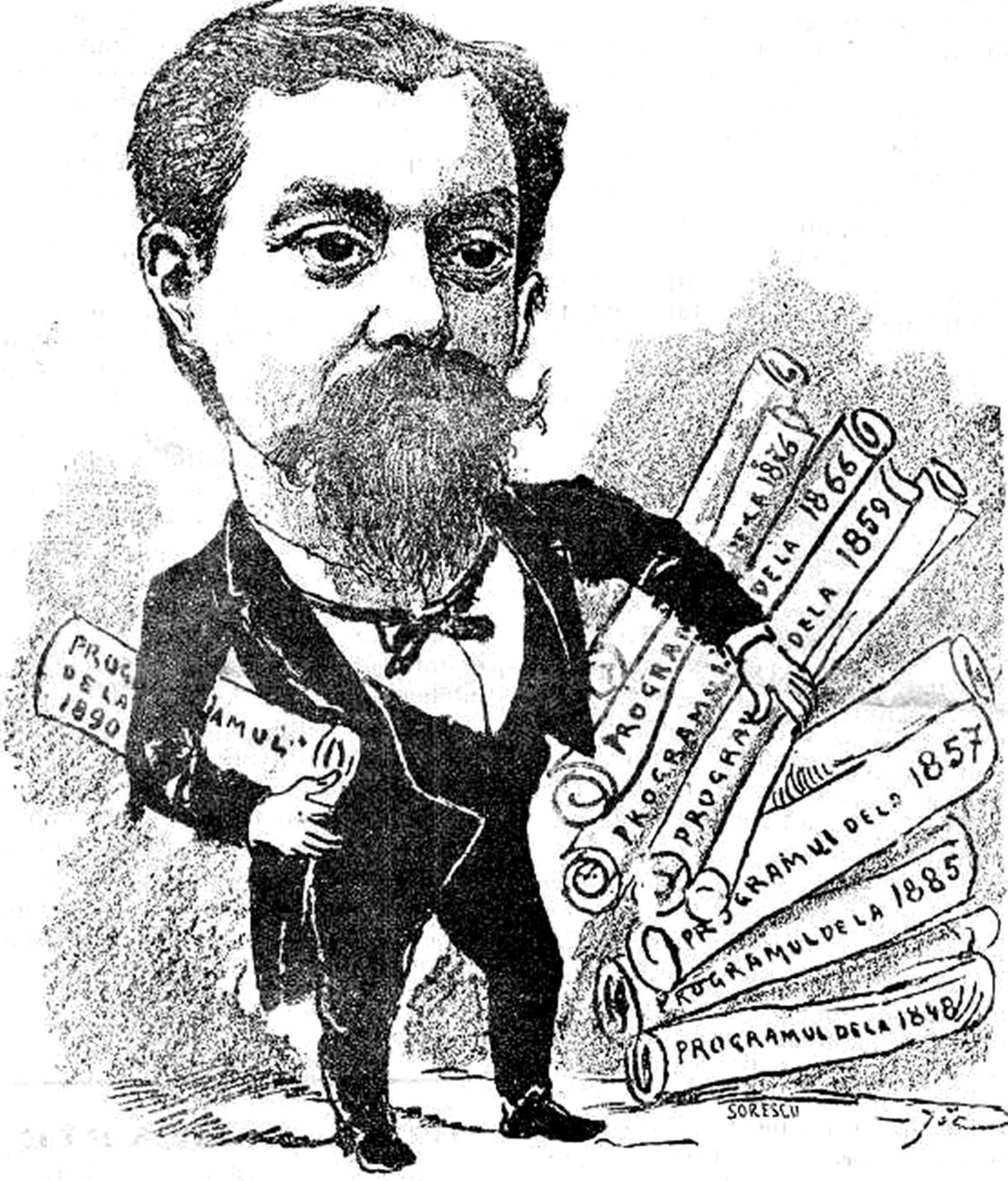
Caricature of Vintilă C. A. Rosetti by Constantin Jiquidi. Rosetti is shown discarding his father's political manifestos and replacing them with his own "Program of 1890"

In 1884, the friendship between Premier Brătianu and Rosetti came to its foreseeable end. On 12 January, when the radicals again proposed a quasi-universal suffrage, Brătianu dismissed them as people with "unbalanced faculties". Unable to persuade the party into following his command, Rosetti withdrew, formalizing his split with the PNL and taking Românul back into the field of independent politics. This left Brătianu in full control of liberal policies—a period known to his adversaries, and to later critics, as the "Vizierate". Gogu Cantacuzino's "Democratic Union" youth also split up: while Mircea Rosetti adopted his father's skepticism, Cantacuzino modernized the PNL's protectionist agenda, and managed the leading National Liberal newspaper, Voința Națională, in partnership with the Brătianu family. The latter gazette also enlisted contributions from the former Rosettists Caragiale, N. Xenopol and Damé.

A new generation of writers took over at Românul, including Rosetti's surviving sons—the eldest, Mircea, had died in 1882. Vintilă, who was appointed editor-in-chief by his father, and Horia, who assisted him at times, preserved the newspaper's socialist flavor. In 1885, Românul organized a Bucharest festival in memory of the Paris Commune, and called on its readers to validate its opposition to the PNL by organizing a public protest. It was also noted for criticizing the PNL government's renewed attacks on the socialist clubs of Moldavia, describing I. Brătianu's stance as purtare nechibzuită ("immoderate behavior"). Its commitment to an immediate single college, and to universal suffrage in the long run, were invoked in its support of the right to strike.

Also joining Românul's editorial staff were socialist novelist Constantin Mille, lawyer-folklorist Dumitru Stăncescu, historian George Ionescu-Gion, Transylvanian agitator Ioan Russu-Șirianu, and, for just one month, leftist opinion-maker Constantin Bacalbașa (previously affiliated with Telegraful). Another collaborator was Dumitru Rosetti Tescanu: an international socialist (but also a Junimist), he published for Românul a brochure with demands for a fully representative single college.

Although employed on the Premier's staff, N. Xenopol was still one of the Românul editors, arranging a meeting between C. A. Rosetti and the celebrated Belgian economist Émile de Laveleye. Laveleye (who sees "Le Romanul" as Romania's "Liberal Progressist paper") notes that the radical doyen was overall happy with the country's constitutional regime, since it still kept up with the "peaceful" Belgian example.

The newspaper fared badly, losing its offices (the Rosetti townhouse) to a fire, and running heavy debts. Under Vintilă Rosetti, Românul established its own printing press (purchasing the enterprise of C. Petrescu Conduratu and renting the townhouse of Constantin Barozzi) and signed a distribution contract with Havas, the international news agency. The offices were rebuilt with state funds, provided by the Lower Chamber in homage to its former President.

=== "United Opposition" and PSDMR politics ===
C. A. Rosetti died in April 1885, having just turned down an offer to stand in the partial elections at Craiova. A huge crowd, comprising the regular readers of Românul, reportedly followed the coffin in a public procession to Bellu cemetery. The newspaper received a large supply of commiserations coming in from readers or former employees, calling the deceased an "illustrious democrat" and his death "a public calamity". A copy was placed on Rosetti's coffin at the Rosetti family crypt.

The paper was entirely distanced from the PNL, and rallied with the "United Opposition". Against the Voința Națională wing, Vintilă Rosetti and D. Brătianu claimed to represent the "true" National Liberals, suggesting that all notable PNL-ists had perished with C. A. Rosetti. Meanwhile, the ex-Junimist George Panu and his gazette Lupta also picked up the Rosettist banner, claiming to be Romania's last radical club.

Românul carried on with some of its traditional preoccupations. Its ongoing criticism of the ruling class as "boyars" was perceived as anachronistic, including by some of C. A. Rosetti's friends. During 1886, it focused on the Bulgarian crisis which looked to be escalating into a new Russo-Turkish War. The gazette then reported on Romania's rapprochement with Austria-Hungary, a policy that seemed to offer the only guarantee in case of a north to south invasion by Russia. Around 1889, activist Panait Mușoiu and journalist Ion Catina, founders of socialist review Munca, were especially active in persuading Românul and the other liberal gazettes to publish positive news about the activity of "workers' clubs". During those years, Românul resumed its monitoring of Austro-Hungarian affairs, and specifically the Transylvanian Memorandum crisis. Like other Bucharest newspapers, it attacked the moderate leadership of the Transylvanian Romanian Party, and especially Vicențiu Babeș, for having hesitated in condemning Magyarization policies. However, the newspaper was perceived as less political and scientific than its earlier versions, with readers complaining that it was publishing too much fiction.

Românul welcomed the creation of a Romanian Social Democratic Workers' Party (PSDMR), which included some of its former staff writers. It gave positive coverage to the group's founding congress of March 1893, noting especially that the socialists promised to solve the Transylvanian question peacefully, "once the working classes will be masters of their fates".

=== Final decade ===
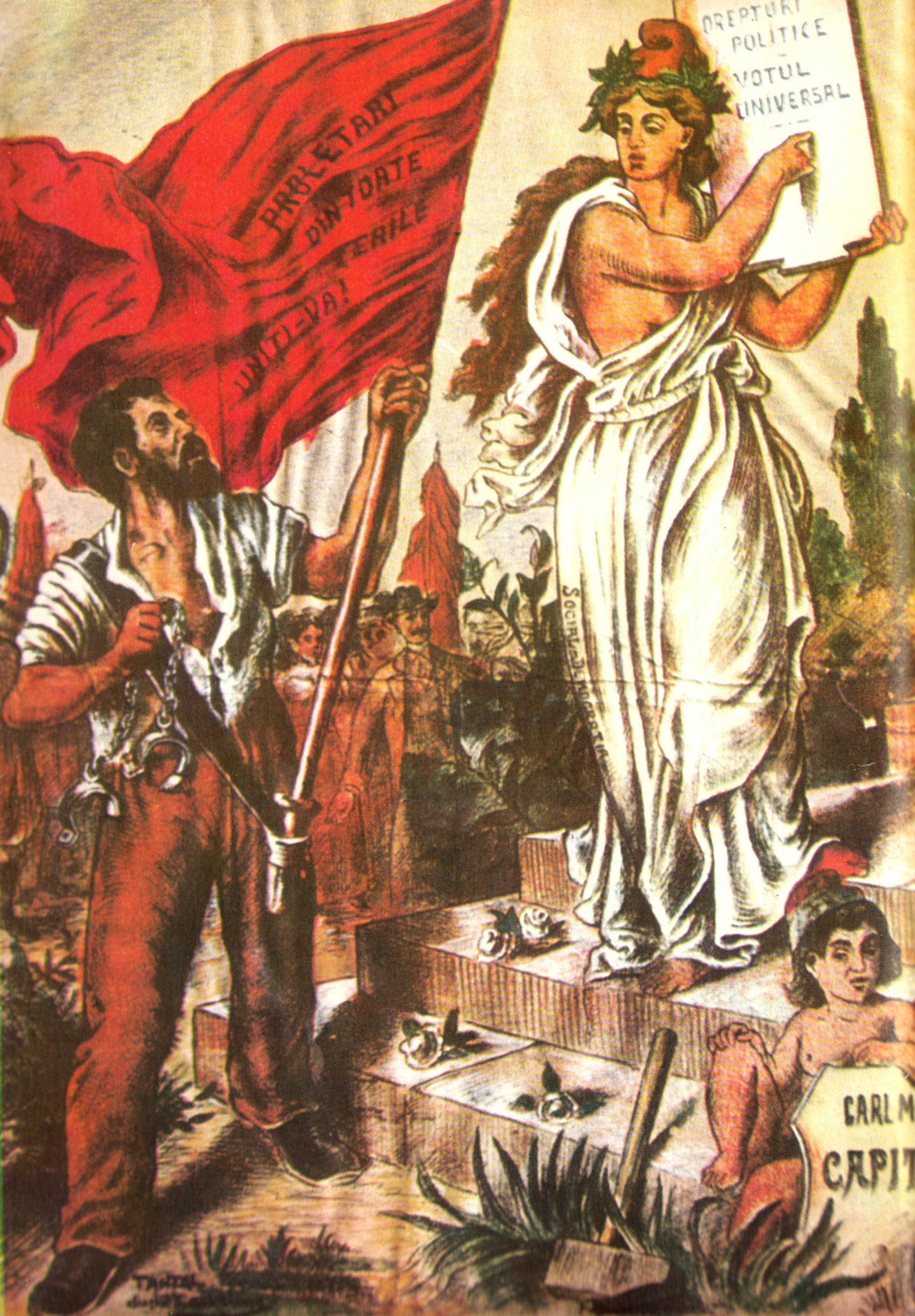
Socialist allegory in the PSDMR's Lumea Nouă journal: the female figure on the right holds up a table of stone with the words Drepturi Politice. Votul Universal ("Political Rights. Universal Suffrage")

From early 1894, Românul was co-opted into supporting the PSDMR's own campaign for universal suffrage. Vintilă Rosetti's offices hosted the reunion of PSDMR-ists, Adevărul democrats, Evenimentul liberals, and left-wing agrarian factions. The resulting League for Universal Suffrage included, among others, V. Rosetti himself, Alexandru Ionescu, Vasile Kogălniceanu and Ioan Nădejde. As a parliamentarian, Rosetti backed the project each new time it was submitted, in 1895, 1896 and 1897—it gathered, at most, 45 from 100 possible votes.

The effort was made difficult from the start: George Panu's anti-PNL radicals were more interested in supporting the Conservatives, while the peasant activist Constantin Dobrescu-Argeș stood accused of embezzlement. However, Vasile Kogălniceanu attached himself to the Românul offices, and was its managing editor until 1897. His Românul articles of 1895 were a strange occurrence, given the prevalent pro-Transylvanian agenda of the liberal milieus: Kogălniceanu proposed a union between Romania and Hungary, with increased rights for all ethnic groups.

By that time, Vintilă Rosetti was being perceived as a champion of both the working class and the destitute aristocrats. Although they complained about the disorganization of the Romanian press, the Rosetti brothers were absent from efforts to create a journalists' trade union—unlike their colleagues at Timpul, Voința Națională, Adevărul, Universul or Epoca. Horia Rosetti was for a while deputy in the 1895 legislature, and was injured by rioting students, shortly before the fall of the second Dimitrie Sturdza cabinet. He no longer focused on political journalism, but on his main passion: the sport of fencing. His career in sports was crowned by his participation as a referee in the 1900 Olympic challenge and his appointment as coach of the national fencing team.

Românul was slowly leaving the central stage of Romanian journalism. In 1899, it switched back from a daily to a weekly, was a bimonthly between 1901 and 1903, and, in its final edition, was again published once a week. The staff was enthusiastic when, in 1900, young journalist Constantin Al. Ionescu-Caion resumed the attack on Junimea. A contributor, N. Ținc, was convinced by Caion's faint proof of Caragiale's plagiarism, assessing that the Junimist "megalomaniacs" were morally bankrupt (the editorial was not published by Vintilă Rosetti, but survives in the Românul archives).

Although moribund, the Rosettis' newspaper still offered a venue for young talents, such as Jewish journalist Henric Streitman. Caion himself was soon co-opted as the main editor. In January 1905, shortly before Rosetti's newspaper closed shop, he founded Românul Literar ("The Literary Romanian"). Caion's gazette, which was primarily a literary venue of the Symbolist movement, denied being a successor of Românul, but still numbered its issues in succession to Rosetti's.

== In culture ==
=== Journalistic trendsetter vs. "macaronic" experiment ===
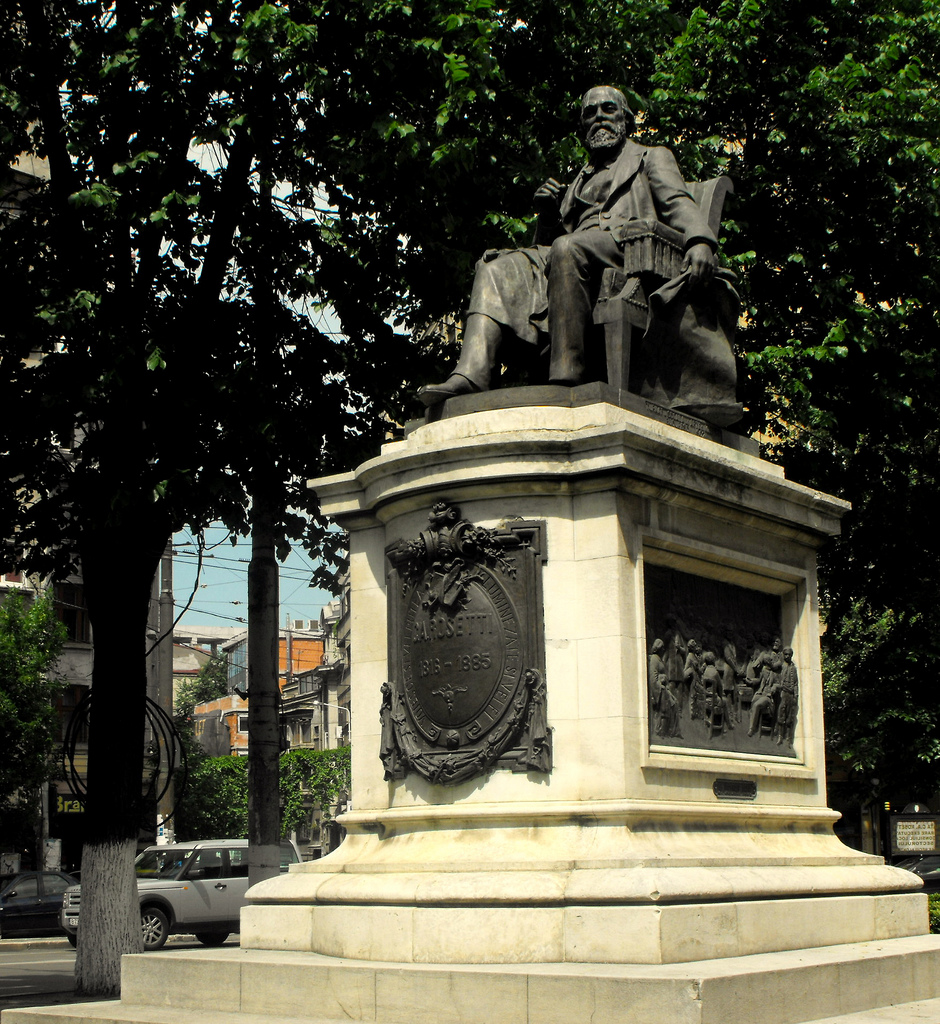
Rosetti Monument: the seated Rosetti holds a Românul copy in his left hand

During its 1881 anniversary banquet, Românul could claim to have been the longest-standing Romanian periodical to date; it was, overall, one of the most long-lived newspapers in Romania's history. In various ways, it was already a landmark of Romanian journalism: writing in 1972, historian Vasile Netea called Românul "the Romanians' first modern newspaper, a real school of journalism for the new generations of writers and publicists." Already under C. A. Rosetti, the gazette claimed various firsts in Romanian press history, most notably the introduction of a black border around the more important obituary pieces.

Before the liberal establishment was divided into competing factions, Ghimpele cartoonists celebrated Rosetti and I. Brătianu as the champions of universal suffrage, progress and liberty. Rosetti invented his playful and pathetic alter ego, Berlicoco ("Pinecone"), referencing his novel hairdo and later used as his regular nickname.

A picturesque aspect of the newspaper was its recourse to antiquated spellings, overly reliant on deep orthography: Romanian words spelled in accordance with Latin, Italian or French rules. In combination with grandiloquent speech, a Rosettist giveaway, these produced a language that was significantly different from the generalized phonemic orthography endorsed by Junimea. The early standard at Românul was to render the /ɨ/ sound in its own name, and in all references to the "Romanian" endonym, as a plain a, highlighting the Roman origins of the Romanians. For unknown reasons, it often replaced the letter o with the digraph uă. Românul also used an extraneous -e suffix in various common nouns, and modified the grammatical article accordingly—for instance, C. A. Rosetti was fondatorele, editorele și redactorele acestui ziare liberale (for fondatorul, editorul și redactorul acestui ziar liberal, "the founder, editor and director of this here liberal newspaper").

Modern philologists have therefore described the standard Rosettist discourse as a "macaronic" dialect, or a constant stream of "declamatory verbiage". As early as the 1860s, Eugeniu Carada amused himself imitating his patron's verbose rhetoric, which he already found counterproductive. In a 1902 retrospective, Titu Maiorescu feigned bewilderment that, given their arguments, the Românul "rhetors" had not been committed to psychiatric wards by their own families. According to literary critic Ioana Pârvulescu, Românul was "written in a cumbersome Latinized orthography and [was] outstandingly pathetic". She also includes Românul among the period newspapers guilty of "horrific [grammatical] errors", with such "bizarre" spelling choices as to "make all assertions look ridiculous." Conversely, in his biographical profile of Rosetti, George Călinescu reads an "inflated" but coherent layer under the unusual orthographic choices. Once Vintilă Rosetti took over as manager, Românul took steps to rationalize its orthography and comb through the ungrammatical excesses.

Sculpted by Wladimir Hegel and inaugurated in 1903, the C. A. Rosetti Monument, Bucharest, shows its subject holding a copy of Românul. A National Library of Romania fund, mysteriously kept under C. A. Rosetti's alias Dinu Rosetti, comprises most of the letters addressed to Românul. Even after its founder's death, the newspaper was known outside Romania: "Romanul of Bucharest" is mentioned by Jules Verne in his speculative novel of 1889, The Purchase of the North Pole. It is the only Romanian title cited among the press reports on the central event: the planned modification of the axial tilt.

=== The "hideous fright": Alecsandri and Eminescu ===
An entirely negative image of the Rosettist tribune was reported by the core group of Junimist conservatives. Loosely associated with Junimea, but previously a conservative figure among the 1848 revolutionaries, poet Vasile Alecsandri set the tune for this polemic when, in the 1860s, he suggested that Românul had introduced Wallachians to the journalistic practice of character assassination. His lyrics make a transparent reference to Rosetti, aștept să văd sub trăsnet hidoasa pocitură / Care-a sădit în țară invidie și ură ("I await to see a bolt striking down the hideous fright / Who has planted envy and hatred in this soil"). Alecsandri also stated his disgust at the proliferation of "Romanianist" advertising, citing Românul as a prime example—"The Romanian newspaper", on par with "Romanian tailor", "Romanian tavern" or "Romanian cașcaval".

Rosetti's traditional enemy, Ion Heliade Rădulescu, preserved a similar image of Rosetti as Musiu Rapace ("Monsieur Rapacious"), "daubed in red, a new upstart and a so-called advocate of the peasants". His lampoons also introduce the long-standing ad hominem of Rosetti "the frog eyes", in reference to his embarrassing exophthalmia. Such irony against the Rosettists inspired Rădulescu's disciple Grigore H. Grandea, who caricatured Rosetti as the extravagant Poruchik Baboi, a hanger-on among the "48-ists".

As early as 1876, the enraged Mihai Eminescu responded to Românul criticism with virulently satirical poems, many of which were not published in Eminescu's own lifetime. Referring to the newspaper as Pruncul ("The Infant", from Pruncul Român), he introduces Bonifaciu Florescu as an "oakum-brained" dwarf, "Bonifaciu the homunculus", and V. A. Urechia as the "pooch" son of a decadent aristocrat, his mind a "lively ruin". Pantazi Ghica was also mentioned for his dilettantism, but also ridiculed for his "50-oka" of kyphosis. Against Florescu's praise of formal purity, Eminescu defends raw poetry, with an argument which took its definitive form in the 1884 piece "To My Critics":

E ușor a scrie versuri
Când nimic nu ai a spune

It shouldn't be too hard to rhyme
When one has nothing of one's own to say

Eminescu's bile is specifically aimed at the Românul writers and the Rosettists in the better known "Third Letter", part of which is a versified version of Eminescu's xenophobic manifesto. In one draft of the poem, the Rosettist "Reds" are referred to as "the stupid mass" of "plebs" and stârpitură ("runts"). In later versions, focus falls on Pantazi Ghica as a hunchback and a cuckold, but especially so on C. A. Rosetti, portrayed as the absolute worst political manipulator. In Eminescu's diatribe, Rosetti, or Reb Berlicoco, is the most seductive of National Liberal demagogues, a ruling class comprising "the mouth-breathers, the windbags, the nincompoops and the goitred". Taking its cue from Alecsandri, Eminescu's poem consecrates Rosetti's portrait as a "hideous fright" with "frog eyes".

Although Rosetti did not bear Eminescu a grudge, an entire critical school, beginning with the leftist republican George Panu, condemned the poem's harshness. After attending the first reading of the "Letter", Panu broke his friendship with the author and ended his Junimea affiliation. For the socialist Constantin Dobrogeanu-Gherea, Rosetti was a traveling companion, and the poet's "contempt" for the radicals, incomprehensible. As argued by Șerban Cioculescu, the "Third Letter" rhetoric was hopelessly outdated: Eminescu's main quarrel was with the more enterprising National Liberals, rather than with the left-leaning Rosettists; moreover, Rosetti was no longer the "internal Plevna" conspirator vilified by the classical conservatives. Cioculescu speculates: "Had Eminescu lived longer, perhaps he would have revised his indictment." Likewise, Călinescu describes Eminescu's anti-Rosettism as "essentially unfair", and proof of the poet's "growing irritability", while Pârvulescu finds it an "enormous injustice" that Eminescu did not recognize any of Rosetti's merits. The nativist and racialist undertones of Eminescu's poem, wherein the Rosettists come off as "the thick-necked Bulgars, the thin-nosed Greeklings", remain especially controversial.

=== Caragiale and Vocea Patriotului Naționale ===
Once he reinvented himself as a Junimist, Rosetti's former pupil Ion Luca Caragiale contributed a milder, but culturally poignant and unrelenting, critique of "Red" demagoguery. As he himself noted, with barely restrained irony, Rosetti's political rallies of the 1870s were "the classical school of liberalism", destined to become utterly incomprehensible for future generations, and as such worthy of being recorded in print.

Caragiale's play O noapte furtunoasă, which mocks the Citizens' Guard as a docile instrument of the "Reds", also introduces Rică Venturiano as a caricature of the Rosettist youth, speaking and writing in macaronic sequences, and editing the ardently republican gazette Vocea Patriotului Naționale ("Voice of the National Patriot")—quite possibly a direct reference to Românul. Through narrative episodes about the tribulations of a "Cordwainer Tache", the author depicts the Guard's methods of pestering the conservative voters. In the subtext, the play directly references Caragiale's first avatar, that of "Red" newspaperman, or at the very least his friend and rival Frédéric Damé. As the author explained in old age: Mă, Rică sunt eu ("Lo, I myself am Rică").

Ironically, Românul advertised the play, unaware of its content, and Rosetti even attended the premiere together with his family (January 1879). The newspaper was afterward dismissive of Caragiale's text. For the Românul chronicler Nicolae Xenopol, O noapte furtunoasă was rather inconsistent, and Venturiano an "entirely fantasized" creation. Damé himself was infuriated by the play's message, and actually found Venturiano to be a positive model of the Romanian youth.

In March 1879, Caragiale returned with other pieces against the radicals, including mock promises that, if created a republic, Romania would be run by the Citizens' Guards and the tavern-keepers, "Patriotism" would be a skilled profession, and Rosetti would be instituted a "Chief Rabbi". In Caragiale's polemical articles, the references to Rosetti's religious-like authority in the PNL are coupled with a mise en abyme of Rosettist electioneering. Writing for Timpul in the early 1880s, he emphasizes the dreariness of parliamentary life, with specific references to Rosetti, P. Ghica, Urechia and other maverick PNL-ists. Further ridicule of the Rosettist program steals the scene in the 1880 Conu Leonida față cu reacțiunea, which also samples from Berlicoco's speeches. The play shows a clueless, but patriotic and republican, entrepreneur, who worships Garibaldi as his personal saint and reads Românul-like propaganda.

The anti-Rosettist joke is again taken up in Caragiale's other main comedy, O scrisoare pierdută, with the matured National Liberal and yellow journalist Nae Cațavencu, a prototype of anti-Junimism. The entire play has been read as the clash between two clienteles, one Rosettist and the other pro-Brătianu. Nevertheless, Caragiale also paid Rosetti the occasional compliment, calling him "that restless and talented newspaperman" (1889).

In other prose fragments, the former Alegătorul Liber journalist retells embarrassing anecdotes about his Rosettist colleagues. One of them claims that the "Red" conspirators of 1866 were blackmailed by a tavern-keeper, having callously signed their names onto an IOU. Some of Caragiale's later articles, published in the mid-1890s by the Junimist sheet Epoca, are tongue-in-cheek recollections of his youth, quoting at length from the verbose appeals of his Rosettist idols. The 1898 sketch Istoria se repetă ("History Repeating") is about the idealism of Românul seniors, such as co-editor Tache Pandrav, who demanded "electoral freedom", and the realpolitik of Rosettist electoral agents: when bidding for the radicals' seat in Prahova County, Pandrav is informed by his own party that he needs "a hakham's blessing" from Rosetti personally.
