= Cocea =

Cocea or Cocéa is a Romanian surname. Notable people with the surname include:

- Alice Cocéa (1899–1970), Romanian-born French actress and singer
- Dina Cocea (1912–2008), Romanian actress
- Dinu Cocea (1929–2013), Romanian actor, film director and screenwriter
- N. D. Cocea (1880–1949), Romanian journalist, writer, critic and activist
- Sofia Cocea (1839–1861), Moldavian, later Romanian essayist, poet and activist
