= Nicolae Nicoleanu =

Imperial Austrian-born Romanian poet

Nicolae Nicoleanu (born Neagoe Tomoșoiu; June 16, 1835–April 7, 1871) was a Romanian poet. born in the Austrian Empire.

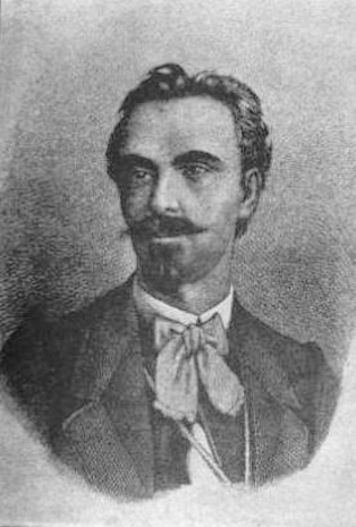
Nicolae Nicoleanu

Born in Cernatu Săcelelor, a village near Brașov in the Austrian Empire, Nicoleanu crossed into Wallachia to attend the episcopal seminary in Buzău, followed by the National College in Craiova. At age 23, he left for Paris, returning three years later after passing through Berlin and Antwerp. He began his journalistic career at C. A. Rosetti's Românul. At age 27, having moved to Moldavia, he became a clerk in Roman. At 29, he was a school director in the provincial capital, Iași. He then worked as a clerk at the State Archives, spent a year as a school inspector for Iași, Vaslui, and Fălciu counties, was a clerk in the Education Ministry, and a secretary at the State Archives in the Wallachian capital, Bucharest. He went insane at age 33 and never recovered, dying in a hospice in Pantelimon. His only published book, a collection of verses called Poezii and prefaced by Iacob Negruzzi, was published in Iași in 1865.
