= Constantin Al. Ionescu-Caion =

Romanian writer (1882 - 1918)

- Born: 1882
- Died: November or December 1918
- Occupations: journalist, historian, poet, short story writer, critic, playwright
- Writing career
- Pen name: C. A. I. Nică Burdușel, Caion, Ion Filionescu, Marin Gelea, Isac Șt. Micu, Roman Mușat
- Period: 1897–1918
- Genres: essay, novella, prose poetry, short story, tragedy
- Literary movement: Literatorul, Decadent movement, Symbolism

Constantin Al. Ionescu-Caion (Romanian pronunciation: [konstanˈtin al joˈnesku kaˈjon], born Constantin Alexandru Ionescu and commonly known as Caion; 1882 – November or December 1918) was a Romanian journalist and poet, primarily remembered for his legal dispute with humorist Ion Luca Caragiale. He was a Symbolist, a disciple of Alexandru Macedonski, and a militant Francophile, as well as a leading opponent of literary tradition. His scattered work comprises essays, short stories and prose poetry, noted for their cultural references, but made little impact on Romanian literature. As a journalist, Caion prioritized scandals, accusing Caragiale of plagiarism and losing the subsequent celebrity trial of 1902, before partly recanting and winning the retrial. Despite his own coquetries with Romanian nationalism, Caion focused his verve on Transylvania's contemporary nationalist literary current.

Ionescu-Caion was the founder of several magazines, most notably Românul Literar. Originally conceived as a literary supplement for the daily Românul, it became a tribune of Macedonski's Romanian Symbolist movement, and helped discover George Bacovia, the celebrated modern poet. During World War I, when he oscillated between the two opposing camps, Caion put out the journal Cronicarul. This was his last known activity in the Romanian press.

A contradictory figure, Caion was equated with infamy and ridicule in the Romanian context, and his evidently unsubstantiated allegations against Caragiale have traditionally puzzled literary historians. In Transylvania, the word Caion was for a while synonymous with yellow journalist.

== Biography ==
=== Early career ===
Little is recorded about Caion's roots, other than that he was a devout Roman Catholic, and a regular presence at Saint Joseph Cathedral. He had a very early debut in cultural journalism. After 1897, when he was 15, his literary chroniclers saw print in several newspapers, under various pseudonyms such as C. A. I. Nică Burdușel, Ion Filionescu, Marin Gelea, Isac Șt. Micu, Roman Mușat, among others. In January 1898, he was employed by Adevărul daily, covering the Romanian tour of Sâr Péladan. Péladan, a writer, mystic and self-styled mage, failed to impress the young reporter, who reported on his various claims with a note of irony. Also then, he affiliated with Macedonski's eclectic art magazine Literatorul (known during the period as Revista Literară). Interested in the Roman Empire, he published with Literatorul a comparative biography of Julius Caesar and Augustus, republished as a book by Carol Göbl of Bucharest.

Also in 1898, Ionescu-Caion completed his adaptation of Jonathan Swift's Gulliver, published by the Adevărul collection Biblioteca Enciclopedică as Trei ani de suferință: O călătorie curioasă ("Three Years of Suffering: A Strange Voyage"). It came with Caion's own critical study of Swift. According to Anglicist Mihaela Mudure, Caion, "a famous journalist and a minor writer", was thus the first Romanian to publish an essay on Swift, albeit one that was "not very sophisticated"; she also notes that the translation added a sexual twist to some of Gulliver's adventures. Caion published other such translations with Biblioteca Enciclopedică, rendering works by Thomas Bailey Aldrich, Louis Henri Boussenard, Henry de Graffigny, Louis Jacolliot and others.

Under contract with Adevărul (1899), Caion published his translation from Prosper Castanier novellas, dealing with "Roman decadence". Writing in 2011, critic Angelo Mitchievici suggested that Caion's introduction to the volume exaggerated Castanier's merits, but was still "interesting" for showing the popularity of "decadentism" in 1890s Romania: Caion's argument was that Rome fell victim to "Asiatic luxury" and sophisticated sexuality ("orgies"). Caion's own texts on the subject of decadence were published as booklets by the French company Retaux Frères. His bibliography for 1899 includes the essay Coversații despre artă ("Conversations on Art"), and, also with Adevărul, a selection of his own novellas.

Not much is known about Caion's other involvements, other than that he attended the University of Bucharest Faculty of Letters, in the same year as fellow journalist Eugen Porn. Although living in the capital, he maintained links with the youth of Iași, and published alongside I. I. Mironescu in the high school magazine C. Negruzzi. His work included an essay about the works of the eponymous novelist. A "Constantin Ionescu", whom literary historian Victor Durnea tentatively identifies as the future Caion, was arrested by Romanian Police on Calea Victoriei, Bucharest, during the breakup of a student nationalist rally (September 13, 1894). He was still enlisted at the university in 1899, when he organized a charity event to benefit the impoverished schoolchildren of Câmpina.

=== Symbolist beginnings ===
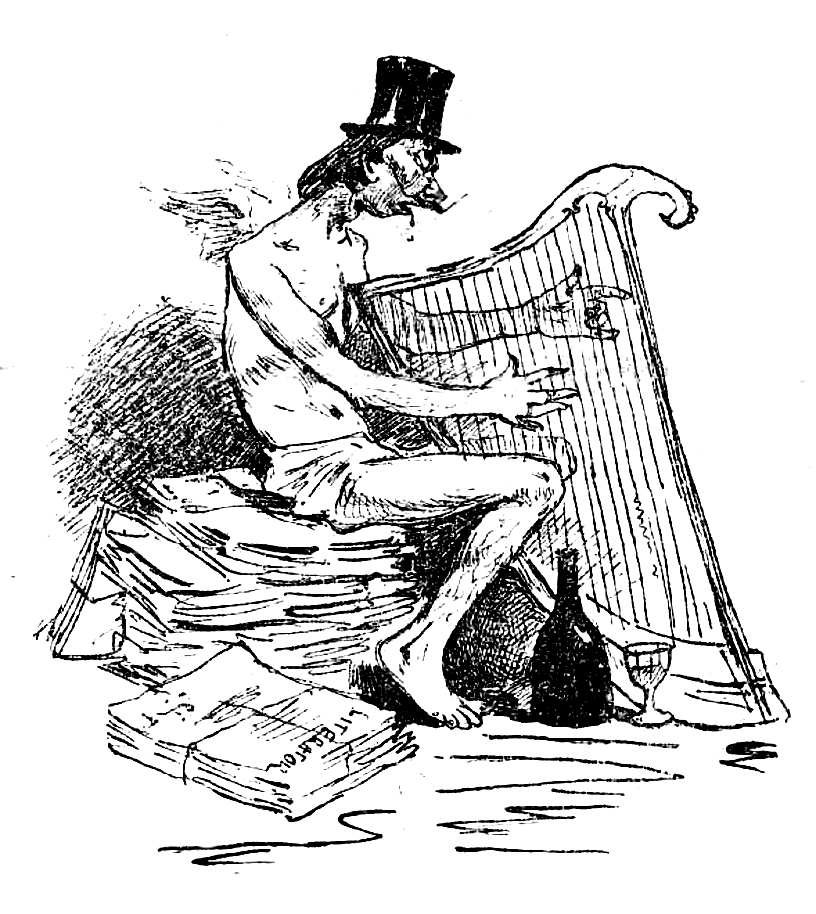
"The Symbolist poet", as portrayed by Moftul Român cartoonist Constantin Jiquidi

Despite his subsequent involvement in various scandals, Ionescu-Caion was not universally perceived as a mediocre journalist. Historian Lucian Boia notes that he "was not without merit as a publicist." Around the year 1900, Caion became a sympathizer of the Romanian Symbolist movement, whose leader was the poet Macedonski. Attached by philologist Ștefan Cazimir to a "Secessionist" current in Romanian literature, Caion made himself noted for a prose poem entirely dedicated to his lover's hair (a recurring theme in Symbolist literature, taken to extremes by the Romanian author). A regular presence in Macedonski's house, Caion mounted a campaign to promote minor Romanian Symbolist authors in France. As noted by critics, the French contacts were themselves fringe magazines, with Legitimist and Traditionalist Catholic agendas.

Caion had an enduring interest in history and, in 1900, completed his monograph on Wallachian Prince Gheorghe Bibescu. Titled Asupra domniei lui Bibescu ("On Bibescu's Reign"), it was first published as an addendum to Georges Bibesco's pamphlet, O execuție ("An Execution"). Bibesco, the Prince's destitute son, continued to employ Caion as his defender and co-author: in 1901, they published an ampler work on the subject of Bibescu family grievances against the modern Romanian establishment. In tandem, Caion publicized his comparison of historical and psychological determinism, with a topical booklet. His first synthesis, Studii istorice ("Historical Studies"), was also available in 1901.

Caion also affiliated with the eclectic journal Noua Revistă Română, where he published historical documents of dubious authenticity and, in 1902, the essay Din umbră. Moravuri antice ("From the Shadows. Antique Morals"). From 1900 to 1903, he was employed by the Bucharest Conservatory, lecturing in "selective world history", and publishing his conferences as a university textbook.

According to at least one account, Caion first encountered Caragiale's irony when he sent him a couple of Symbolist poems. The senior writer picked up on their involuntary humor, and proceeded to ridicule Caion. Literary historian Tudor Vianu believes that Caion was especially infuriated when Caragiale's magazine, Moftul Român, made a public mockery of his Secessionist prose poem. In his gibe, Caragiale feigned enthusiasm about the young writer's debut. Parodying Caion, he suggested that the young poet carry on writing a "lyrical-decadent-symbolist-mystical-capillary-secessionist" novel about a hairdressers' art society, whose members glue strands of hair onto canvasses or carve soap into human figures.

=== Caragiale scandal ===
Caion followed an elaborate recipe for revenge, with exposes in the Symbolist Revista Literară review, of which he was by then the co-editor. The owner, Th. M. Stoenescu, had been Caragiale's adversary since the 1880s. Described by Vianu as "a real pathological character", Caion claimed to expose Caragiale's drama, Năpasta, as plagiarized. In his report, Caion suggested that the real author was a Hungarian, Kemény Istvan—who, in fact, never existed. In order to back his claim, Caion published quotes from Năpasta alongside a supposed translation from Kemény. Reading these fragments in good faith, Caragiale was astonished by what he took to be a bizarre coincidence.

Macedonski followed the developments with enthusiasm, granting further exposure to Caion's claims. For Macedonski, the young accuser embodied "the aspiration for beauty", "the new aesthetics", "courage and selflessness". As commentators have suggested, the poet responded to Caragiale's satires of him and his Symbolist salon, and attacking, in Caragiale, the entire anti-Symbolist club Junimea. At Revista Literară, Stoenescu began suspecting a canard, and asked Caion to present further proof for his accusations. The latter produced two sheets printed in Romanian Cyrillic, which reportedly included fragments from an 1884 Romanian translation. Unconvinced, the editor promptly suspended his collaboration with Caion. The latter soon changed his statements, arguing that "Kemény" was a pseudonym used by Leo Tolstoy, and that Caragiale was guilty of copying The Power of Darkness.

Although Stoenescu was a disciple of his, Macedonski favored Caion in this dispute, and employed him to write more denunciations of Caragiale in the magazine Forța Morală. Forța Morală expanded on the initial accusations, claiming to have discovered an entire history of plagiarism in Caragiale's writings (from Victorien Sardou to Alfred Duru). Following Macedonski's intercession, Caion was also supported by the historian Grigore Tocilescu, who made Caragiale the sole topic of his Romanian Atheneum conference (January 24, 1902).

Românul newspaper, put out by the entrepreneur Vintilă Rosetti as an anti-Junimist outlet, also stood by Caion. Its columnist, N. Ținc, had prepared a piece describing Caragiale and his Junimist colleagues as obsessed with their own role in culture. Unpublished until 2006, Ținc's article noted that "the poor Caion" had unwittingly struck a blow against "the youngest, sickest and therefore most innocent of the [Junimea] megalomaniacs." Rosetti's paper was hosting its own campaign against Caragiale, headed by Caragiale's former employer Frédéric Damé. Meanwhile, Caragiale found his core group of journalist sympathizers in the Junimist fief of Moldavia.

Caragiale had by then proceeded to research the matter on his own, and came to the independent conclusion that the accusations were entirely concocted. Late in 1901, he opened a legal case against both Caion and Stoenescu, taken up by the Ilfov County court. On the first day, Caion excused himself as sick, while Stoenescu recused himself, taking the prosecution's side. For these reasons, the trial was held without a jury.

Caragiale's legal representative was the fellow writer Barbu Ștefănescu Delavrancea, who systematically disproved Caion's allegations, and noted that the absentee defendant was guilty of numerous forgeries. He also convinced the judge that the similarities between Năpasta and The Power of Darkness were superficial. The court found Ionescu-Caion guilty of slander. He was sentenced to a three-month jail term, a 500 lei fine and 10,000 lei in court costs. However, he appealed the tribunal's decision. The jury selection was a laborious process: Caion's lawyer Danielopol recused writers Nicolae Iorga and Ovid Densusianu, alleging that all Romanian literati had a vested interest to defend plagiarism. Iorga took offense, and reportedly challenged Danielopol to a duel. During the proceedings, Caion backed up on the original accusations, explaining that he had only invented a reason to bring Caragiale in for a trial. The court eventually acquitted Caion.

Caragiale showed little surprise at the news. In an interview with poet Alexandru Antemireanu, he explained his conflict with Caion in paternalistic terms: "They did well not to sentence the kid. Is he the guilty party? No! Caion is merely a victim. Say I were a juror: why would I be setting an example by punishing this unreasonable and irresponsible kid, for those who are more mature and better placed, and who employ the same means as he did?" The general public was by then firmly on Caragiale's side, and Macedonski's reputation suffered greatly as a result, increasing his isolation on the literary scene.

=== Românul Literar ===
Caion was still carrying on as a publicist and historian, with a study about the ancient Bacchanalia. It was simultaneously published in Paris and Bucharest (1901). That year, with Carol Göbl press, he also published a devotional text, Isus, fragment ("Jesus, A Fragment"). The theme of decadence continued to fuel Caion's essays: in Carmen magazine (September 1902), he covered Castanier's Lotus du Gange, implicitly advertising the book's lewd content and titillating illustrations. His take on the Caragiale affair was outlined in the Carol Göbl essay Moravuri literare în 1902 ("Literary Morals as of 1902").

In 1903, Caion himself began working at Românul, where he was an editor, corresponding with Vintilă Rosetti over the newspaper's publicity deals. He returned to belles-lettres with a 1903 short story, Korinna. His fiction reflected his growing interest in Early Christianity, illustrated by another story, itself published in 1903: Pentru cruce ("For the Cross"). This was followed in 1904 by a volume of "Christian short stories", Triumful Crucei, which he submitted for consideration to the Romanian Academy awards committee. Christian subjects infused his parallel work for the stage, as well as his historical research. In 1904, he published a Byzantine-themed tragedy, Legionariĭ Cruceĭ ("Legionaries of the Cross"), and an essay on "The Rivalry between Jesus and Saint John the Baptist" (La rivalité de Jésus et de saint Jean-Baptiste).

A split occurred at Românul in late 1904: on January 10, 1905, Caion issued Românul Literar as a separate weekly, announcing to the world that all his links to Românul had been severed (this even though Românul Literar's first issue was introduced as "Issue 1, Year 3"). The director himself signed the column Note critice ("Critical Notes"), and four others which reviewed books local and foreign; they were collected in book form in 1905. Caion's sheet was irregularly published for the next three years, and, in December 1908, became a tri-monthly.

Românul Literar was a voice of anti-nationalist and anti-traditionalist sentiment, rejecting the school formed around Sămănătorul magazine, and promoting the Symbolists; its agenda has been summarized as "anti-Sămănătorist", and in step with modern French literature. It played host to many Romanian writers, most of them Romanian Symbolists: Macedonski, Mihail Cruceanu, Mircea Demetriade, Al. Gherghel, Dumitru "Karr" Karnabatt, Eugeniu Sperantia, Caton Theodorian, alongside the epigrammatists Cincinat Pavelescu and I. C. Popescu-Polyclet. Cruceanu, who joined the literary club while still a high school student, recalls being impressed by Caion's status as "a literary historian and critic", "his restrained demeanor and his intelligence, with its inscrutable pursuits." However, Caion seemed "ill and troubled", and had "an unnatural and mean passion for going after those people who had made a name for themselves in our cultural life", with his "venomous weaponry". Other Symbolists took distance: Moldavian poet and literary reviewer Ștefan Petică made a mockery of Caion, exposing him as a sciolistic amateur.

In addition to receiving contributions directly from France, Românul Literar published translations of poems by Frédéric Mistral (translator: Elena Văcărescu), Jean Moréas (Demetriade) and Albert Samain (Popescu-Polyctet). Other than poetry and fiction, Românul Literar hosted literary and scientific essays, including ones by Caion, Ținc, Ioan Tanoviceanu, Orest Tafrali and others. The journal also enlisted contributions from poet Cornelia "Riria" Gatovschi and her husband, the formerly Junimist historian A. D. Xenopol. Românul Literar's founder was especially enthusiastic about Riria. Against mainstream critics, who derided her poetry as stale and ungrammatical, he proclaimed the dawn of a new era, with Mrs. Xenopol as its herald. Caion, Tocilescu and the Xenopols were members of a small professional association, called "Romanian Society for Arts and Literature".

Around 1907, Caion's paper was hosting poems by the young Symbolist author George Bacovia (including "Sonnet" and "Pulvis") and art chronicles by Theodor Cornel. Bacovia described their first encounter, in November 1903, as follows: "Caion [...] was very depressed after his recently completed trial with Caragiale. My solitary presence, without any sort of recommendation from another author, made him receive me with significant reserve. I then communicated the purpose of my arrival, asking for the address of his collaborator, the poet Macedonski. Nevertheless, he still asked me for a handful of poems, the ones later published by his magazine."

=== Caion and the Transylvanians ===
Ionescu-Caion was unrelenting in his accusations of plagiarism, and a section of the press, in both Romania and abroad, still credited him as a whistle-blower. His Romanian supporters called him a David fending off Caragiale-Goliath, while the Revue de Paris referred to his stances as "courageous". By that time, the formerly nationalist journalist had made himself new enemies outside the Junimea circles. These were ethnic Romanian writers from Transylvania, region that was then still part of Austria-Hungary, including many traditionalists published by Sămănătorul. Early signs of this conflict showed up during the Caragiale trials, when Caion and Macedonski nominated Sămănătorul founding figure George Coșbuc as another successful plagiarist. Around the same time, he reputedly stated that Transylvanian literature was "a monstrous apparition".

Caion's dispute with the Transylvanian poets covered several fronts. In 1905, his newspaper joyfully announced that Ștefan Octavian Iosif (whom he called by his Magyarized legal name, István Gábor József) had been expelled from the Romanian academic scholarship program. According to Caion, Octavian Goga's father-in-law, politician Partenie Cosma, was "the tyrant of Transylvania", and Coșbuc's ally, the literary chronicler Ilarie Chendi, was a "Romanianized" Hungarian, with little authority in local literature. These reactions did not prevent Caion from becoming a co-author of the first Transylvanian (and Romanian) encyclopedic dictionary, put together by Cornelius Diaconovich. To the indignation of other Transylvanians, "Ionescu-Caion, C. A., publicist, Bucharest" is a contributor of historical entries in Diaconovich's second tome.

The ideological conflict involved various aspects of literary theory and activism, including the differences of opinion about reforming the literary language. Transylvanian political leader Alexandru Vaida-Voevod noted that the neologistic dialect favored in the Old Kingdom was symptomatic, since "Caion and the likes" were popularly identified as the literary professionals. Linguist Sextil Pușcariu also commended Transylvanian literati for standing up to the "unhealthy currents" promoted by Caion, Macedonski and Karnabatt.

Caion's indignation reached a peak in September 1909, when the Romanian Writers' Society (SSR) was officially established as a compromise between the Symbolists and the Transylvanians, doing away with the Romanian Society for Arts and Literature. In Românul Literar, Caion described the club as a mass of "déclassés", concluding: "With the likes of Herț, Kendich, Ivăciuk, Demetrius [that is: A. de Herz, Chendi, I. Dragoslav and Vasile Demetrius], for sure the new society shall uproot the old one, where one comes across respectable people such as A. D. Xenopol, Riria, N. Petrașcu, Pompiliu Eliade, Gr[igore] Tocilescu etc." Another controversy shook the literary community when the SSR decided to exclude those authors who could not prove their belonging to the Romanian ethnic group. Although Românul Literar was itself suspected of antisemitism, Caion decided to stand by the Jewish Romanians who were thus excluded. In a March 1910 article, he sided with the Noua Revistă Română owner Constantin Rădulescu-Motru (a critic of antisemitism) and journalist Eugen Porn (a Jew), noting that Porn's acceptance into Romanian literature was at least as justified as Ilarie Chendi's.

Românul Literar tried to keep up with the latest developments in literary form, and Caion was among the first Romanian reviewers of Futurism. He also continued to participate in polemics with "chauvinistic" nationalists, denouncing them for promoting the myth of Banul Mărăcine as ancestor of Pierre de Ronsard. However, the paper went out of print in January 1911. It was reestablished as a bi-monthly on November 1, and again ceased publication in December. It was restored a third and final time in June 1912, but went out of business soon after.

Meanwhile, Caion focused on his Francophile essays, writing about the French influence on Romania. The fragment Înrâuriri franceze mai vechi ("Older French Influences") saw print in the "encyclopedic magazine" Ilustrația, whose director was Nicolae G. Rădulescu-Niger, the comedic poet. With Riria and the Symbolists, Caion began putting out a French-language literary journal, called La Revue Roumaine (first issue: February 1912). The Transylvanian rivals at Luceafărul were unimpressed. According to them, La Revue Roumaine was beneath all other Francophone periodicals, either Romanian or Hungarian, unwitting evidence of "the inferiority and impotence of our [national] literature".

When, in 1912, Macedonski made his publicized return to literary life, the Transylvanians reacted with astonishment. In Arad, the journalist Ovidiu Băsceanu covered the comeback of "an enemy" as "Caion's triumph". He believed that the Symbolist offensive was presided upon and propagated by Caion, under the slogan: "I cursed, I libeled, I vanquished." Caion himself focused on his academic career, and, in 1913, took his Ph.D. with the thesis Îndrumări nouă în viața politică și culturală a Franței contemporane și înrâurirea lor asupra noastră ("New Directions in France's Political and Cultural Life and their Influence on Us"). It was published, in 1914, by Poporul Typographers.

=== World War I and death ===
By the start of World War I, while Romania was still neutral territory, Caion supported France and the other Entente Powers. He was "a Francophile to the uttermost" (according to Boia), publishing the booklet Rolul Franței în istoria omenirii ("France's Role in World History"). Two other books on this subject saw print in 1915: Gallia și înrâuririle ei ("Gaul and Her Influences"), Sparte contre Athènes ("Sparta against Athens"). As noted by a Universul Literar columnist, Caion did not glorify the French Republic, but was rather a fan of the Ancien Régime. Caion cited a wealth of French authors, even obscure ones ("who would not be great were they not the intellectual friends of the author"), to prove that German culture was "anarchic and worthless".

The Central Powers' invasion of Romania surprised Caion and made him reconsider his options. He stayed behind in occupied Bucharest, and, as Germany's victory seemed certain and Romania signed the Peace of Bucharest, timidly embraced the "Germanophile" cause. From August 17, 1918, Ionescu-Caion put out the magazine Cronicarul ("The Chronicler"), which enlisted contributions from noted Germanophile writers, such as Gala Galaction and Duiliu Zamfirescu. Its theater chronicler, Radu Pralea, was among the first to cover the Jignița Summer Theater of Isidor Goldenberg, a mainstay of Yiddish dramaturgy in Romania. Another Cronicarul employee was the female journalist Aida Vrioni, who became Caion's friend and, in time, his apologist.

The magazine, noted by Boia for its "high literary standing", publicized Caion's reformed views about the course of the war. He wrote that the new Germanophile Prime Minister, Alexandru Marghiloman, embodied "Romania's national energy", much like the figures in Thomas Carlyle's On Heroes. His stances, like those of Marghiloman, had their dose of ambiguity. As Marghiloman recounts, Caion circulated an anti-German manifesto put out by the revolutionary Social Democrats and the "Socialist Women of Romania". Moreover, Caion still revered the anti-Germanophile Xenopol. In issue 27 of Cronicarul, he referred to Xenopol's memoirs as a masterpiece of Romanian prose.

Caion died only a few months later, in liberated Romania. As Lucian Boia notes, he had lived long enough to see all prophecies about a German victory being nullified by the November 1918 Armistice. According to bibliographer and educator Tudor Opriș, his was a "heroic death", which served to clear his tarnished reputation.

== Legacy ==
=== Ignominy ===
The various scandals involving Constantin Al. Ionescu-Caion have left distinct marks on Romania's cultural life. Boia writes: "Caion [...] secured himself an unwanted fame in the history of Romanian literature". In early 20th-century Transylvania, "Caion" was adapted into a common noun and a term of contempt. Listing its "Transylvanophobe" enemies, Luceafărul noted the existence of "all sorts of Caions, those little puppies raised by the obscure magazines." Also in Luceafărul, priest-publicist Alexandru Ciura stated: "We live in the epoch of the Caions, for whom all things are permitted". Caion's poor reputation also rubbed off on Macedonski: Caragiale's disciple Alexandru Cazaban coined the word Macaionski, as a hybrid of both writers.

The scandal continued to reverberate, and Caion soon earned condemnation from critics not directly involved in the early 20th-century disputes. A liberal and a modernist, Eugen Lovinescu, dismissed Caion's entire career in letters as a footnote. It likened Caion to a "squid" that leaves behind "a long trail of ink", and judged his brand of literary criticism to have been "one of the illnesses of that time." In contrast, Cronicarul's Vrioni spoke of her friend's attack on Caragiale as a "mistake", noting that his career from 1901 was of genuine importance. Caion, she writes, created "true works of art", without sparing a thought for "glory or money."

According to literary historian Alexandru Dobrescu, Caion is the prototype "detractor" in Romanian culture, "born of frustration", the Zoilus to Caragiale's Homer. Dobrescu writes: "In the common definition, the detractor is someone consciously working to debase (or destroy) one's good standing. The cobbler envious of his neighbor, the cordwainer, who will go lengths to besmirch the latter in hopes of 'helping' him lose his clientele, is a detractor." His verdict about Caion's unicity in a Romanian context is placed in doubt by another author, Constantin Coroiu, who finds it unrealistic.

Various commentators believe that Caragiale's ultimate relocation to Germany was at least in part prompted by the Caion affair. This was notably suggested by Caragiale's actor friend, Ion Brezeanu. Moreover, literary rivals as well as third parties have noted that Caion's calumnies shed focus from his own dubious creative methods. In his speech of 1902, Barbu Ștefănescu Delavrancea openly accused Caion of forging historical records during his stint at Noua Revistă Română. More than fifty years after the fact, Ștefan Cazimir discovered that the poems Caion claimed to have authored, and which Caragiale found especially entertaining, were in fact poor-quality translations from Charles Baudelaire.

In 2007 Ionescu-Caion's name was returned to circulation, amidst allegations of plagiarism brought up against philosopher Gabriel Liiceanu. Writer Andrei Pleșu defended Liiceanu against his accusers at Ziua daily, and argued that Romania was still "Caion's land". Noting that Caion had entered press history with a mârlănie ("yokel's deed"), Pleșu described Ziua journalism as partisanship and "hysteria", assessing that Romania was going through "an epileptic fit". Liiceanu critic Gheorghe Grigurcu also took distance from the Ziua accusers, noting that their "libel", "puerile" in content, made it hard to sustain a serious debate about Liiceanu's faults.

=== Other literary echoes ===
Caion's presence at the center of literary and political controversies was treated with much sarcasm by his various peers, even before the 1901 face-off. In addition to the "lyrical-decadent-symbolist-mystical-capillary-secessionist" parody, Caragiale may have attacked Caion in an 1899 Universul sketch, as Superintendent Lazăr Ionescu-Lion. Both writers were satirized in a revue, officially written by restaurateur G. A. Mandy (but probably authored by Rădulescu-Niger). The work focuses on the 1901 stock market panic and its political consequences in Romania; Caragiale (as Gearacale) and Caion (Crayon) appear alongside scheming politicians or journalists—Take Ionescu, George D. Pallade, Luigi Cazzavillan—and the runaway embezzler Andrei Vizanti.

The legal scandal between Caion and Caragiale is traditionally considered one of Romania's most famous trials. The legal professionals' magazine Curierul Judiciar and lawyer-editor Octav Minar published the court records in its Biblioteca marilor procese ("Great Trials Library"), May–June 1924. Theater scholar Cristian Stamatoiu finds Delavrancea's plea not just a "shattering" proof of erudition, but also a guide to understanding the issues of artistic personality and intellectual property. As a personal witness of the proceedings, Brezeanu noted that Delavrancea spoke like a modern Demosthenes.

"Caion" was a breakthrough role for Gheorghe Dinică, ensuring his move from stagehand to award-winning thespian. This was in a 1962 stage reconstruction by David Esrig, with Jules Cazaban playing Caragiale and Mircea Șeptilici as Delavrancea. Among the many volumes dealing with the legal face-off is a stageplay by dramaturge and critic Romulus Vulpescu, first published in 1972.
