= Sofia Cocea =

Sofia Cocea (15 June 1839 – 27 October 1861), also known under her married name as Sofia Chrisoscoleu or as Sofia Hrisoscoleu, was a Moldavian, later Romanian essayist, journalist and poet.

== Biography ==
Born in Fălticeni, she was from a modest family of estate managers. At age thirteen in 1852, she translated a novel by Madame de Genlis from French into Romanian, under the title Palmira și Flaminia sau secretul ("Palmira and Flaminia or the Secret"), as well as the play Maria sau mustrările de cuget ale unei mame ("Maria or a Mother's Qualms of Conscience"). Gheorghe Asachi, then working a censor, considered the latter immoral and tried unsuccessfully to have it banned. When she was seventeen, she applied for a grant to study abroad but was denied. She studied at Iași and at Târgu Neamț, becoming a schoolteacher in the latter town and in Vaslui in 1857, later founding a private boarding school in Fălticeni. In 1859, she married Professor V. Chrisoscoleu. She aligned herself with the writers and journalists who, after the 1848 revolution, advocated the unification of the Danubian Principalities.

Linguist Sanda Golopenția describes her essays as "lively, firm, courageous and slightly ironic"; these appeared in the leading pro-union journals of the time, including Tribuna română, Reforma, Gazeta poporului, Zimbrul, Foiletonul Zimbrului, Românul and Dacia, as well as in Steaua Dunării and Gazeta de Moldavia. Among the topics she covered were the peasantry's economic and social status, women's rights, culture and public education and foreign policy. Golopenția considers that her occasional poems are "by far superseded" by her journalism and essays. She died in Vaslui.
