= Mihail Zamphirescu =

Mihail Zamphirescu (1838 (or 1839) – June 15, 1878) was a Wallachian, later Romanian poet.

He was born in Bucharest, but little is known about his early life. His father was probably named Zamfir, and he attended Saint Sava College. He may have studied literature and philosophy at the universities of Paris and Vienna (with the help of Ion Heliade Rădulescu, according to some sources), but this appears unlikely, and no corroborating documentation exists. He spent nearly his entire adult life as a clerk in the administrative headquarters for Bucharest's hospitals, and died in a sanatorium.

Zamphirescu wrote for the newspapers România and Dâmbovița, and for the magazines Buciumul, Revista Carpaților, Revista contimporană and Foaia Societății pentru învățătura poporului român. He published three books: Aurora, a small poetry volume (1858); Muza de la Borta Rece, a theatrical improvisation and parody of Junimism (1873); and Cântece și plângeri, a collection of verses (1874). He left behind two unfinished poems (Nebuniada and Bătălia de la Teișani) and a rhyming dictionary.
