= 1857 Wallachian parliamentary election =

- September 1857

All ≈100 eligible seats in the ad hoc Divan
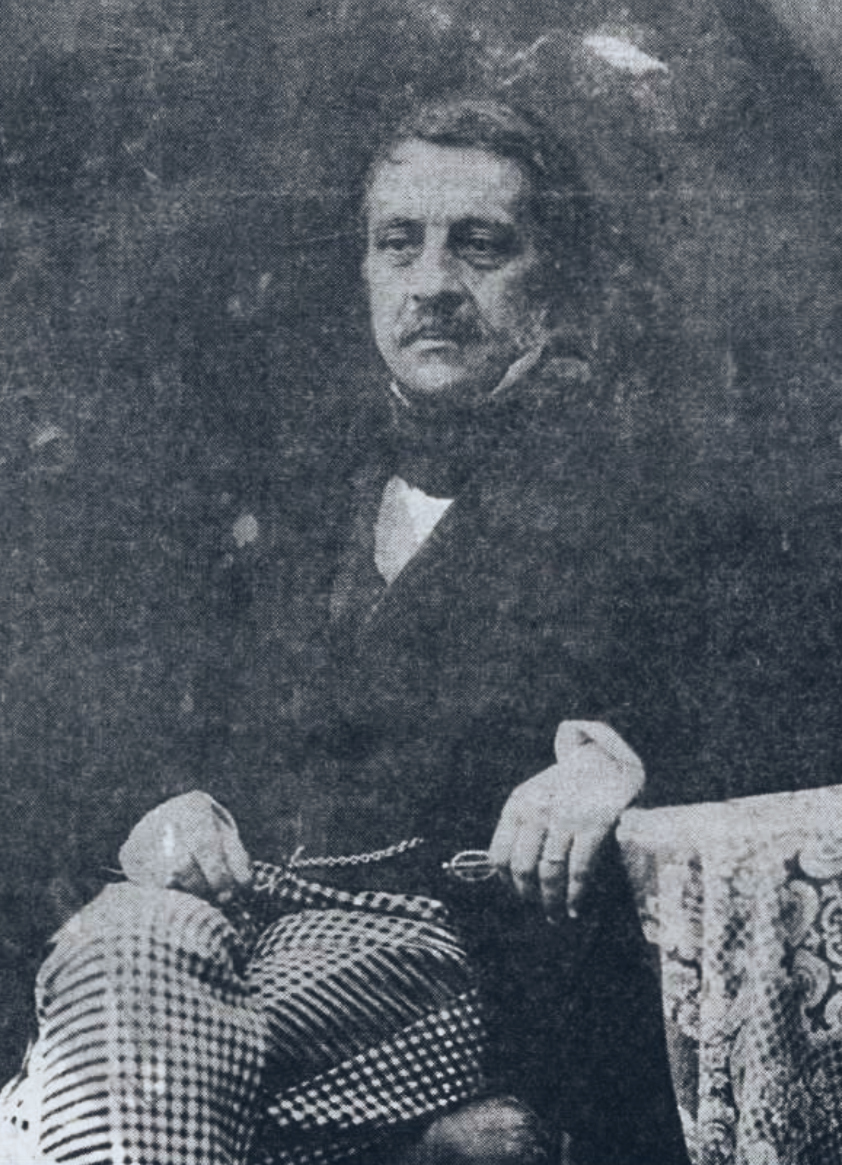

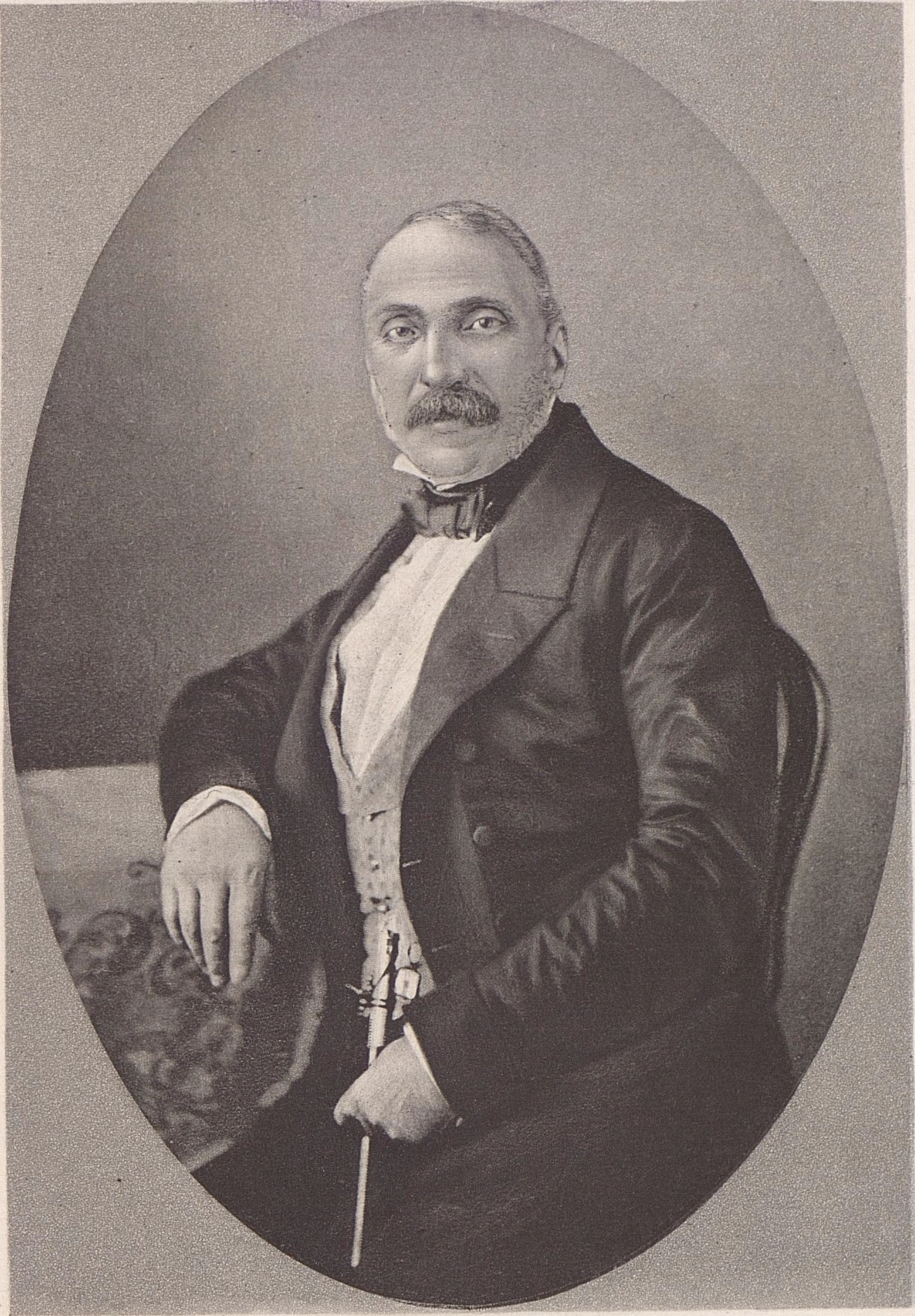

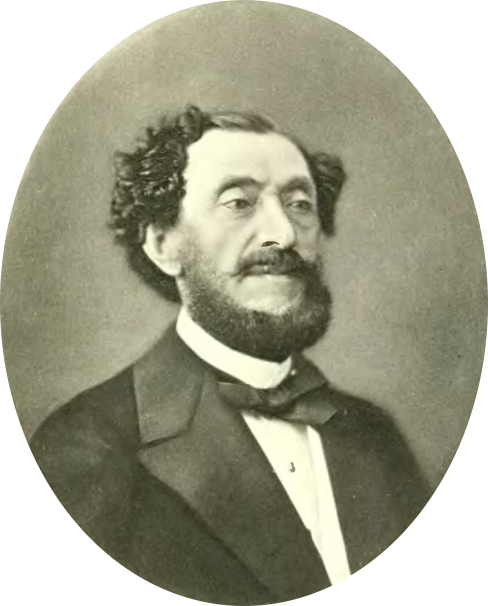
| | First party | Second party | Third party |
|---|---|---|---|
| Leader | Constantin A. Kretzulescu | Gheorghe Bibescu | Barbu Dimitrie Știrbei |
| Party | Unionist Committee (National Party) | Unionist Committee (conservative) | Unionist Committee (conservative) |
| Leader since | 1857 | 1856 | 1856 |
| Leader's seat | Brăila County | Dolj | Dolj |
- Wallachian constituencies, by number of deputies sent to the ad hoc Divan.

Elections for the ad hoc Divan were held in Wallachia in September 1857. They restored a liberalizing trend that had been repressed following the 1848 revolution, also giving expression to the national awakening that was taking part among the Romanians. The toppling of the conservative Regulamentul Organic regime in both Danubian Principalities made them possible: following the 1856 Treaty of Paris, Wallachia and Moldavia functioned as protectorates of the European powers; both were also clients of the Ottoman Empire. Excluding the spontaneous rallies of 1848, this was the first public consultation to be held in eleven years. It ran in conjunction with the Moldavian Divan elections, and, like them, had unusually lax criteria for participation, allowing peasants and guilds to vote by indirect suffrage.

The result in both countries was a sweep for parties which demanded union with Moldavia. In Wallachia, the progressive National Party, chaired by Constantin A. Kretzulescu, was on this topic indistinguishable from the conservative unionist factions, respectively led by brothers Gheorghe Bibescu and Barbu Dimitrie Știrbei. A fourth party, supporting Alexandru II Ghica and Dimitrie Ghica, cooperated with Kretzulescu's Committee, although disagreeing over some core policies. These groups held an absolute majority in the Divan, with only some seats going to non-unionists. Together, they formulated demands for union and increased autonomy, postponing debates about universal suffrage; middle-class progressives and the boyar elite also dissuaded peasant deputies from demanding land reform.

The Divan resolutions were taken into account by the European powers, and some were written into the Paris Convention of 1858, which became the new organic law for the "United Principalities". This document outlawed class privilege, but also reinforced old suffrage laws, eliminating the peasant vote. It also prevented the two states from fully merging, keeping the key institutions separate—but a loophole in the text allowed a personal union. In the repeat elections of January 1859, Wallachia voted a conservative "elective assembly", dominated by Bibescu supporters. Pressured by the National Party, which threatened violence, this new parliament gave its vote to a Moldavian, Alexandru Ioan Cuza, who became Hospodar, then Domnitor, of both countries.

== Historical context ==
=== Regulamentul background ===
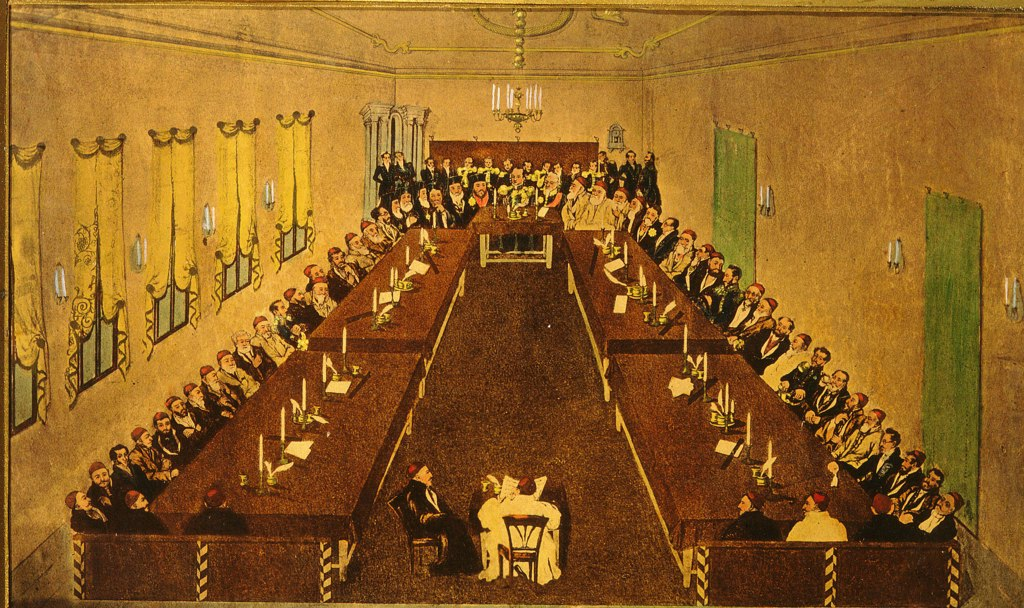
The Ordinary National Assembly, 1831 watercolor

The Principalities had been occupied by the Russian Empire during the latter's war with the Ottomans (1829). The result was a shared Russian–Ottoman custody, with Regulamentul Organic as a constitutional law imposed on both vassals. Introducing modernizing principles such as the separation of powers, Regulamentul also reformed representation for the estates of the realm, producing the "Ordinary National Assembly"; in Wallachia, this comprised 42 members—19 of whom were elected by the 17 counties. The electoral corps was exceedingly small: 20 representatives of the upper-crust boyar aristocracy were voted in by 56 electors, and the county representatives, generally low-ranking boyars, by some 400 electors. This mixture of modernizing and traditional elements was arrived at by repressing both the emerging liberal current, which wanted more complete freedoms, and the traditionalist boyars, who resented power-sharing combinations.

By 1836, the Assembly and the titular Prince of Wallachia, Alexandru II Ghica, were in open conflict, the boyars having discovered that sections of Regulamentul had been forged, giving legislative oversight to the Russian envoys. Although the event ended in defeat for the deputies, it helped consolidate a "National Party", which was increasingly anti-Russian. This period saw early projects to unite Wallachia and Moldavia, with even liberal Russians encouraging the idea of a "Dacian" dukedom; at least one such proposal, drafted by the Moldavian boyar Leonte Radu, also included the Principality of Serbia.

Following Ghica's ouster, his replacement was to be elected by the estates and then recognized by Sultan Abdulmejid I. The vote took place in December 1842, confronting two Russophile brothers with discreet nationalist agendas—Gheorghe Bibescu and Barbu Dimitrie Știrbei—, with each other, with the anti-Russian Iordache Filipescu, and with the arch-conservative Alecu Filipescu-Vulpea. Bibescu won by exhaustive ballot, picking 69% of the votes in the last round. Although nepotistic, his government introduced various liberal reforms, including a customs union with Moldavia, the defense of education in the national language, and the first steps toward abolishing Roma slavery. He soon found himself at odds with the National Party over the issue of mines concessions and dismissed the Assembly, effectively ruling as an absolute monarch from 1844 to 1846. When finally elections were held in November 1846, the Prince clamped down on the boyars' electoral privilege by outlawing multiple registrations and by imposing his own candidates: 18 of 20 elected by the first estate were his close associates.

However, within two years, he and his friendly Assembly were toppled by the liberal-and-nationalist Revolution. Regulamentul was denounced and publicly burned. During this brief interregnum, the Proclamation of Islaz promised universal male suffrage (tempered by indirect elections) within a republicized elective monarchy. Most revolutionaries agreed that there was still no social grounding for universal direct suffrage. Some elections based on these quasi-democratic principles were held at Vlașca, but the process was cut short by more pressing political issues. The new forms of representation allowed peasant deputies such as Ene Cojocaru to demand the abolition of corvée, which survived despite there being no formal serfdom. The issue became entangled with a lengthy and divisive discussion about land reform.

=== Repressive regime ===
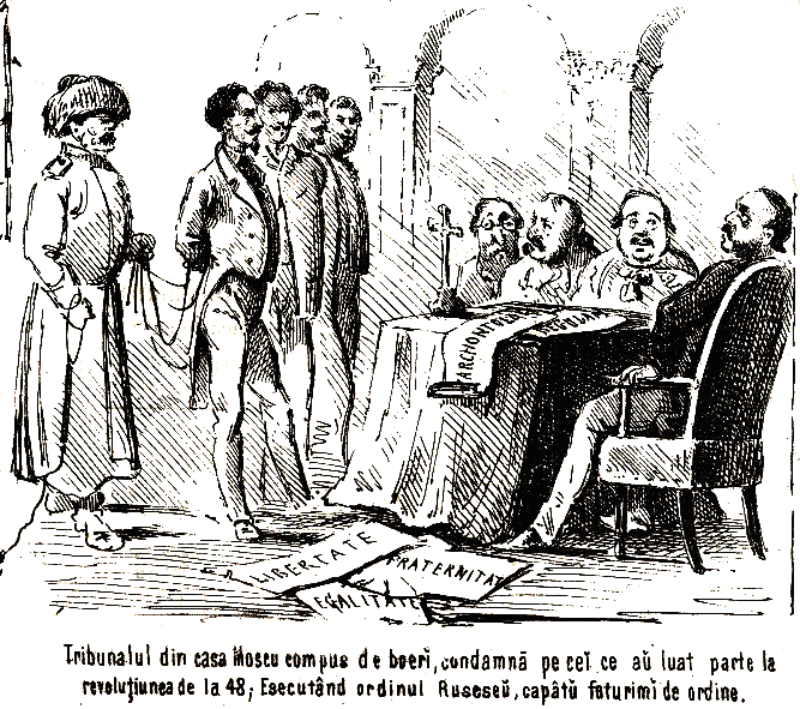
Participants in the Wallachian Revolution of 1848 prosecuted by Russophile "boyars". Political allegory of 1868

The clampdown by a joint Ottoman–Russian intervention, and the Convention of Balta Liman, restored Regulamentul but suspended the elective monarchy. Princes were designated by Abdulmejid, with Știrbei taking the throne of Wallachia for a period of seven years. The Assembly, reconstituted as the "National Divan", mainly preserved consultative functions, being composed entirely of bureaucrats, judges, and bishops of the Wallachian Orthodox Church. Most revolutionary leaders were either expelled or self-exiled. This group only included 23 men; however, the government also began a clampdown on political activities, persecuting even those remotely associated with the 1848 cause—for instance, the architect Iacob Melic. The poet Constantin D. Aricescu, who circulated revolutionary poetry in manuscript form, was arrested and imprisoned.

The National Party was reconstructed in exile by the 1848 revolutionaries, who, from ca. 1850, began pressing for union above all other points on the agenda, although its leaders remained committed to international republican and European federalist causes to 1856. In this context, there was a noticeable rapprochement between Bibescu and the exiled revolutionaries, pushing Știrbei to adopt an even more conservative stance, and making him more reliant on the military. His repressive regime was cut short by the Crimean War, in which Western powers sided with the Ottomans against Russia. The events also interrupted Nicolae Pleșoianu's designs to participate with other former revolutionaries in the New South Wales gold rush. However, most failed to enlist in the Ottoman Army, as they had intended.

The Austrian Empire intervened to clamp down on revolutionary activity in Oltenia (the western third of Wallachia). Here, the Ottoman authorities had allowed the liberals to put out a newspaper, Jurnalul Craiovei, which, in June 1854, hosted Dimitrie Bolintineanu's editorial in support of union under Ottoman suzerainty. Also in June, Austrian troops occupied both Principalities, preventing Russia from maintaining a presence in the Balkans. With Count Coronini as military supervisor, Știrbei was reconfirmed as Prince. Alongside his minister Nicolae Kretzulescu, he consolidated conservatism, refusing to grant entry permits to exile radicals, and instituting heavy censorship of the media. Both however endorsed the unionist cause, explicitly so from 1855, when Kretzulescu lobbied the Palmerston cabinet and Napoleon III for a unified Romania, governed from Bucharest and possibly ruled upon by Știrbei. In such proposals, Știrbei also insisted that Wallachia preserve its dominant role, and campaigned against moving the capital to Iași. He found an ally in Ioan Maiorescu, the former revolutionary, who drafted a unionist project stressed the need for a Wallachian on the throne, and also promised to draw the resulting state into Austria's sphere of influence—though both regarded the latter proposal as unrealistic.

Știrbei and Maiorescu's vision was endorsed by some of the more conservative exiles, including Gheorghe Magheru and Ion Heliade Rădulescu; others, including the Romanian Revolutionary Committee of Paris, militated both against Știrbei and for unification. Another wing of the unionist movement was a "bourgeois group", clandestinely formed during autumn 1854 to support Alexandru II Ghica's return on the throne. Its members included Ion Ghica, Constantin Bosianu, economist Gheorghe Costaforu, and banker Cristache Polihroniadi, who together sponsored the newspaper Timpul. As noted by diplomat Henry Stanley, the Wallachians were also divided along geopolitical priorities. Boyars, who were especially fearful of land reform, included "many Russian partizans [sic]", while the middle classes were mostly against Russia, with students and peasants generally pro-Ottoman.

While still present in the Principalities, Austrian envoys gave some endorsement to the more radical projects for peasant emancipation. According to historian Alexandru Lapedatu, they did so in order to stoke social conflict, as the unionist nationalism embraced by boyars raised the issue of irredentism among the Romanians of Transylvania and Bukovina. Although he welcomed constitutionalism, Viscount Palmerston rejected the proposal to make Wallachia and Moldavia a condominium of the West and the Ottomans, regarding them as inalienably Ottoman. He remained agnostic about union, although Villiers of Clarendon and Napoleon came to support the idea. Napoleon, "eager as he was to dismantle the creation of the 1815 Vienna treaties", also envisaged a foreign dynasty for the new state, moving either Francis of Modena or Robert of Parma to the new throne.

Știrbei, who emerged as the Austrian favorite in a close race with Bibescu, continued to preserve an ambiguous, "extremely prudent", course. In 1855, seeking to curtail the Ghicas' influence, he repressed Timpul and encouraged radical unionists to publish a more left-wing paper called Patria. During September, members of this group, led by a 19-year-old Eugeniu Carada, publicly celebrated the fall of Sevastopol. Știrbei again attempted to contain the movement by co-opting Carada as a junior Dragoman in his ministry. Writing at the time, Maiorescu also advised Știrbei to seek counsel from the more "mature" among Wallachia's revolutionary exiles. In February 1856, Știrbei issued letters of protest, directed against the Ottomans' attempt to re-annex the Principalities—but also criticizing the Wallachian revolutionaries active in Ottoman ranks. He also pressed for a boyar assembly to review and reform Regulamentul.

== Preparation ==
=== Ghica's regency ===
With the defeat of Russia drawing near, exiled unionists began presenting their case to the Ottoman statesmen, introducing their project as a moderate guarantee against both Pan-Slavism and Greek nationalism; some in this group also wished for union to be effected under Grigore V Ghica, who was at the time the reigning Prince of Moldavia. Still a conditional Știrbeist, Maiorescu opposed the ideological threat posed by Ottomanism, and, with Constantin Hurmuzachi, prepared for print a brochure accusing the Sublime Porte of pervasive encroachment on Wallachian and Moldavian autonomy. During those weeks, Ottoman and Austrian diplomats met with envoys of Britain and Imperial France to discuss the property regime in Wallachia and Moldavia. Though divided between a radical anti-boyar position taken by Austria's Prince Prokesch-Osten and a strongly conservative project advanced by Lord Stratford de Redcliffe, they eventually agreed on the need to suspend the corvée and eliminate all remaining forms of personal servitude.

In March 1856, a Western protectorate was established under the Treaty of Paris; Ottoman sovereignty was kept in check by Austria, Russia, Britain, France, Prussia, and Sardinia. The Treaty also specified the notion of representation and public consultation, instituting the ad hoc Divans. Consultation was going to take place including in respect to the Principalities' union—although the latter was opposed by the Ottomans and the Austrians. The Ottoman viewpoint was embraced by Palmerston and Clarendon, who tried to persuade the French into renouncing the foreign dynasty scheme, which was particularly disliked by Abdulmejid.

With censorship laws still in place, the unionist campaign was supported from Moldavia by the National Party magazine Stéoa Dunărei. Public disputes were focused on conflicts between the conservatives Știrbei and Alexandru Ghica, who took over as Caimacam (regent); the National Party was organizing more discreetly, with Ioan I. Filipescu forming a club for what he called the Bucharest sans-culottes. In July, Grigore Ioranu of the National Party informed the Moldavian Mihail Kogălniceanu that "Bucharest is now crisscrossed by committees overseen by the Central committee. This was replicated in just about every district." In Buzău, the Union Committee, formed on March 16, was confronted two days later by the Assembly of Landowners, which rejected the unionist agenda; Stéoa Dunărei reported that the latter only had 6 members, less than half of those who had registered with the Committee. Unionism of various hues was also spread by the Freemasonry. A Masonic Lodge established for this purpose was particularly active in the border town of Focșanii Munteniei, reuniting boyar and bourgeois activists: Alexandru Plagino, Grigore D. Marghiloman, Constantin Robescu, Alecu Sihleanu, and Panaite Tufelcică. Filipescu also contacted Aga Constantin A. Kretzulescu, brother of the resigning minister, asking him to sponsor a unionist gazette. Kretzulescu refused, reportedly because he disliked the movement's anti-boyar radicalization and "anarchism".

By August 1856, Caimacam Ghica, who remained an anti-unionist and "not a man of progress", sought to clamp down perceived unionist cells in the state apparatus. He tried to depose Iancu Marghiloman from his position as governor of Buzău County, but did not consider doing the same for conservative governors who were "persecuting the unionists". He had also split the conservatives by ordering a purge of Știrbeists from the administration; Barbu Știrbei, his son George, and Plagino were all driven into passivity or collaboration with the National Party. Most boyars rallied with yet another conservative-and-unionist faction, which was headed by Bibescu; Ghica sought to counter the trend, outing himself as a backer of Timpul. Filipescu also used this confusion to set up a clandestine Unionist Committee, which branched out into all Wallachian cities and began petitioning foreign governments to obtain a timetable for the unification. The Committee was also behind the enthusiastic welcoming of the French Commissioner, Baron Talleyrand, which doubled as an anti-Ottoman and anti-Austrian demonstration. Some 80 men also greeted Talleyrand in Buzău, asking him to promote the "union of both principalities as a strong state".

Over those months, the revolutionary exiles began testing Caimacam Ghica's resolve by making their way back into the country, sometimes with Știrbei's tacit endorsement: Magheru, Alexandru G. Golescu and Grigore Serrurie had regained Bucharest before the end of 1856. Ion Brătianu returned in the early months of 1857. At that stage, authorities began observing that unionist propaganda was already being taken to the streets and the villages—in November, schoolteacher Constantin Tănase of Olt was under surveillance for having collected signatures in support of the National Party agenda. In September, Alexandru's nephew, Beizadea Dimitrie Ghica, who had kept a low profile ever since 1848, publicized his own manifesto, which offered a crossover of liberal and conservative doctrines, chiding youth for the Talleyrand incident. This younger Ghica did not oppose union with Moldavia, but advised its partisans not to draw too much attention to their project. This revival failed to impress the returning exiles, with Serrurie writing in November that boyardom needed to be "burned alive and its ashes scattered". Heliade's conservatives, who maintained some links with the Ghicas, also began reorganizing themselves into a more cohesive group: by November, Heliade and his associate Niculae Rusu Locusteanu were putting out their own newspaper, Conservatorul, from exile in Bellinzona. It published political essays critical of other emergent factions, and praised the Caimacam as a balanced reformist. They differed from all other factions in their solution to the peasant issue, advocating collective farming and utopian socialism, and even suggesting the violent expropriation of boyar estates; Bolintineanu described their agenda as "something out of a madman's brain".

=== Election firman ===
Categories enfranchised under the election firman
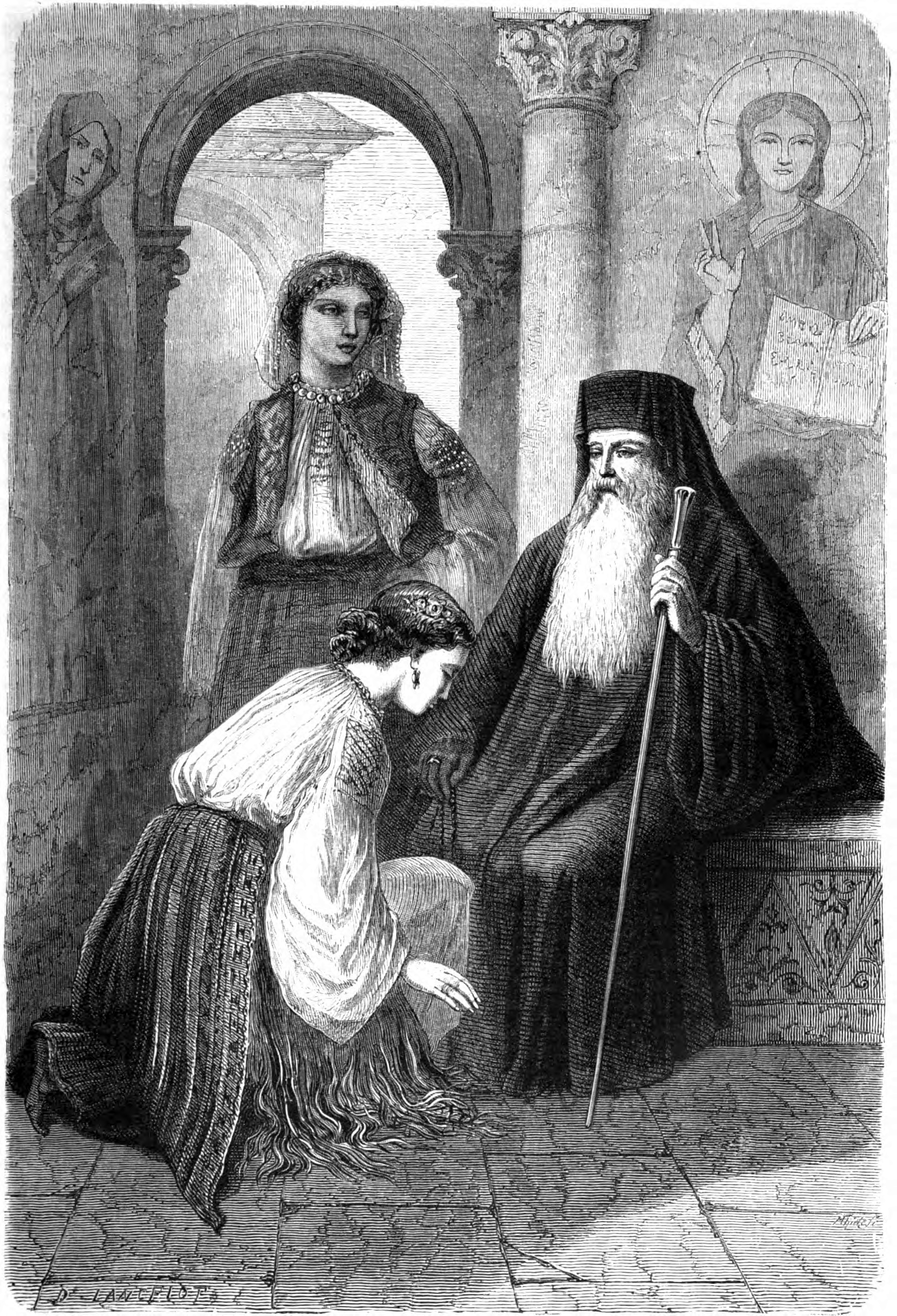
An Oltenian stareț (Horezu Monastery, 1860)

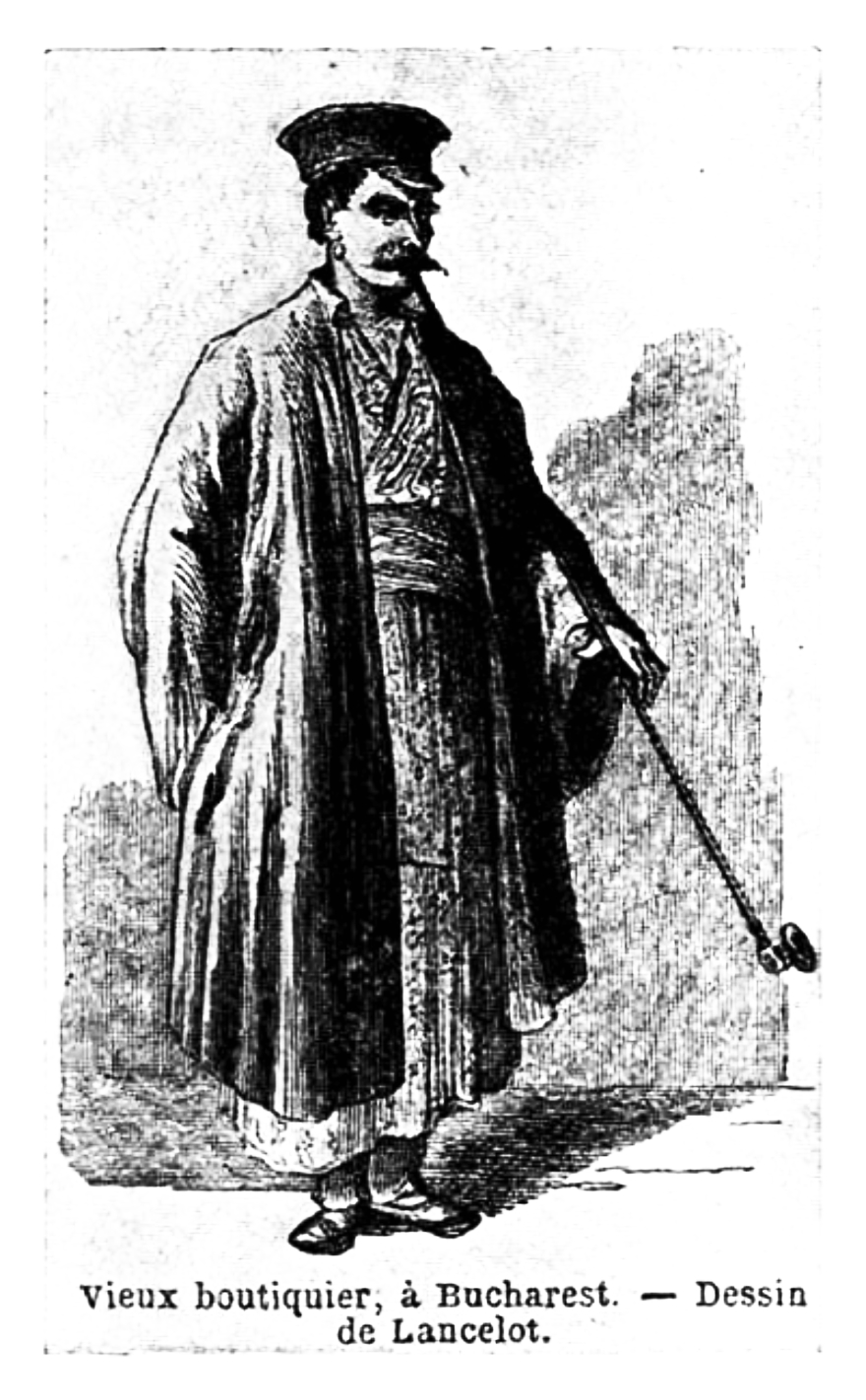
Merchant of Bucharest (1860)

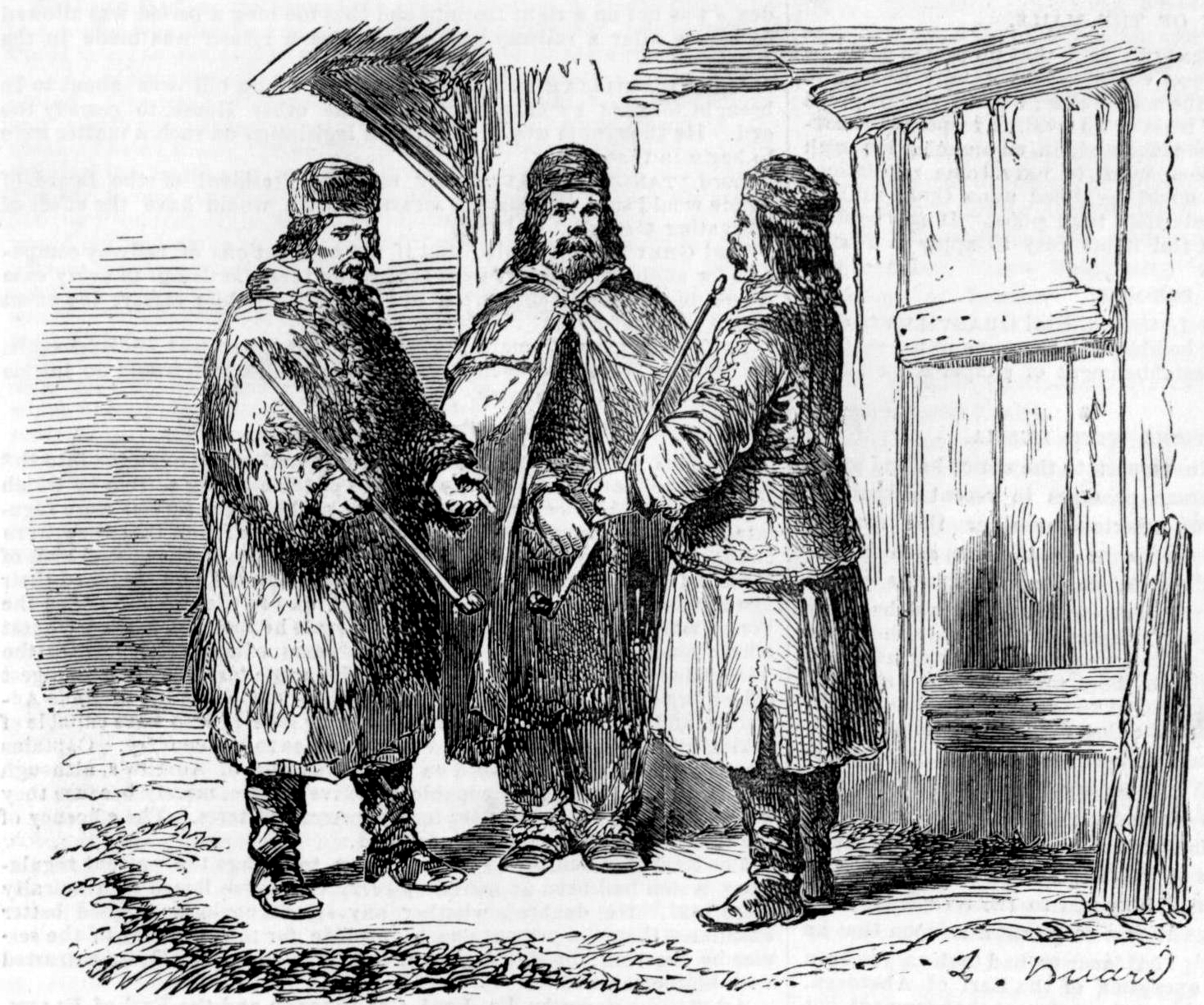
Peasants of Wallachia (1854)

After consultations with Western plenipotentiaries, the Sultan took the initiative and, on January 13, 1857, issued a firman sanctioning elections. This was read out publicly in Bucharest in March, and signed into law by Ghica in April. It set the voting age at 30, while splitting the electoral corps into five classes of voters, with massive enfranchisement. There were 10,141 qualified electors in Wallachia, as opposed to only 2,954 in Moldavia. At core, the Divans would still preserve corporatism as the electoral principle, retaining a characteristic of its 1840s predecessors; however, the firman introduced radically new divisions of the body politic, such as recognizing the political importance of liberal professions. Although, in the 1850s, guilds "no longer controlled production", they maintained some local importance as "professional and fiscal organizations", and were still assigned an electoral function. The document was also expressly against the political enfranchisement of Romanies who had been enslaved until 1856.

Overall, there were 94 to 100 deputies. Accounts differ because of the unspecified number of supplementary seats for the Wallachian clergy, which now enfranchised priests and stareți. The bishops were members by right; clergy also elected 6 or 10 deputies altogether—4 of which represented the high clergy. Outside the church class, there were 90 Divan deputies, representing the 17 counties, with at least one deputy per county capital and at least 4 from the rural constituencies. Dolj and Prahova had 6 deputies each, and Ilfov had 8, 4 of them representing Bucharest.

Boyars were controversially merged into a single group, and, except for the wealthiest, were not allowed to vote outside their home county, partially confirming Bibescu's earlier limitations of suffrage. High-ranking boyars, comprising some 90 people, were thus fused with the 2,700 of the low-and-middle boyar category; the only requirement for membership was owning an estate over 111 hectares (0.4 square miles), although candidates had to own at least 334 hectares (1.3 square miles). By September, the category had been restructured to include 753 voters, about 20% of whom were concentrated in Ilfov and Buzău.

Urban constituencies included all 17 county capitals, each electing one deputy, except for Bucharest's 4, and for 2 each in Craiova and Brăila. Brăila was eventually relegated to one deputy, and Ploiești moved up to where it had two. Voting rights were only extended to some portions of the urban class, with various grandfather clauses attached; groups included: state-recognized professionals, regardless of wealth, who had been living in the respective town or city for no less than three years; homeowners with a taxable wealth set at 8,000 kuruşlar—or 20,000 in Bucharest; attested tradesman and master craftsmen; and journeymen (voting indirectly—with 4 electors per guild). This electoral geography produced an urban constituency comprising, overall, 3,000 voters: 1,300 were in Bucharest (about 2% of that city's population), and 285 at Craiova, with as few as 43 for Târgu Jiu.

The other two classes, both rural, voted indirectly: 8,000 non-aristocratic landowners were defined as having at least 11 hectares (27 acres), and sent 5 electors and 1 deputy per county (although their numbers ranged from 1,630 in Romanați to only 12 in Brăila County); 220,000 peasants were represented through their 2,931 village assemblies, which elected two delegates each, with all county delegates electing one deputy per county. The latter provision was especially unpopular with the boyars, who feared a surge of "mean passions". Resigning from the ministry in April 1857, N. Kretzulescu asked Édouard Thouvenel, France's Ambassador to the Porte, to withdraw that requirement (although he conceded on the inclusion of non-boyars and guilds).

== Unionist consolidation ==
=== Forging alliances ===
Timpul was again published from December 1856, signalling the lifting of censorship. By then, its "anti-feudal" campaign was also assisted by Costaforu's theoretical journal, Magazinul Judecătoresc. In February of the following year, C. A. Kretzulescu was finally allowed to put out a moderate unionist paper, Concordia, published in Bucharest. Eventually, Caimacam Ghica also renounced anti-unionism and, alongside the Timpul faction, moved closer to the National Party, hoping to defeat Bibescu. Also in February, two of the Caimacam's counsels, Costaforu and Bosianu, alongside his nephew Dimitrie and Barbu Bellu, published an "ultra-liberal" manifesto for the foreseeable elections. They now attacked Concordia for its views on class collaboration—according to historian Vasile Maciu, Bellu was infiltrated into the group by Bibescu partisans such as Constantin N. Brăiloiu and Barbu Catargiu, who hoped that ideological conflicts would distract both groups from pushing an egalitarian agenda.

During the last days of February, Costaforu and Bosianu split with Bellu, establishing a "free assembly" of the National Party. Writing for Timpul, Costaforu invited the grand boyars to voluntarily relinquish all privilege or risk placing themselves "outside the nation." His party did not support land reforms, but stated its opposition to the corvée system, declaring it a breach on personal sovereignty. Union, Costaforu argued, was an "old idea of our nation", the "political tendency of the whole people", and was therefore inevitable. Concordia's Ion Bălăceanu joined the club on its creation, but left within days, alleging that it only existed to serve the Ghicas; in fact, Costaforu was attempting to energize the middle class into preventing all boyar candidacies for the Divan, and hinted at designs for a democratic republic.

Beyond Concordia and Timpul, the unionist campaign also relied on direct tactics, including oratory: voter interest was exceptionally high, with as many as 700 attendees at campaign meeting in Bucharest in March (almost half of the entire electoral basin). Majority groups rejected the radical platform advanced by the Ghicas, leading Bosianu to withdraw from the National Party. Before March 3 (New Style: March 15), he was talked into rejoining and awarded with a seat on the Unified Committees, alongside Costaforu. The party as a whole, co-chaired by C. A. Kretzulescu and banker Lazăr (Lazaros) Kalenderoglu, issued a program demanding union under a foreign dynasty, with autonomy, perpetual neutrality, extended suffrage, and representative government. The extended agenda proposed equality before the law, a codified right to property, freedom of contract and the suspension of corvées.

From April, coordination between the two branches of the National Party was enhanced by the arrival to Bucharest of a Moldavian delegation comprising, among others, Kogălniceanu, Vasile Alecsandri, and Dimitrie Ralet. The established platform was communicated to the local party branches of Wallachia, which also organized in the open. While heading the National Party as a whole, C. A. Kretzulescu also organized the Brăila County section. At Vlașca, Serrurie held a chair on the regional Committee, alongside State Ariton and Ioniță Gurki. Aricescu emerged as the radical unionist leader in Muscel County, where he and Nicolae Rucăreanu staged political plays which propagated the nationalist slogans. The Bucharest trend was also witnessed in Prahova, were, as historian Silvia Marton notes, "liberals and unionists feverishly organized themselves". Before May, Costaforu had traveled around Wallachia, spreading his philosophy among the various clubs. This activity was observed and criticized by the Russian consul, Konstantin Basily, who argued that calls for a "social revolution" would compromise any "political reform" that was expected of the union.

=== Emerging consensus ===
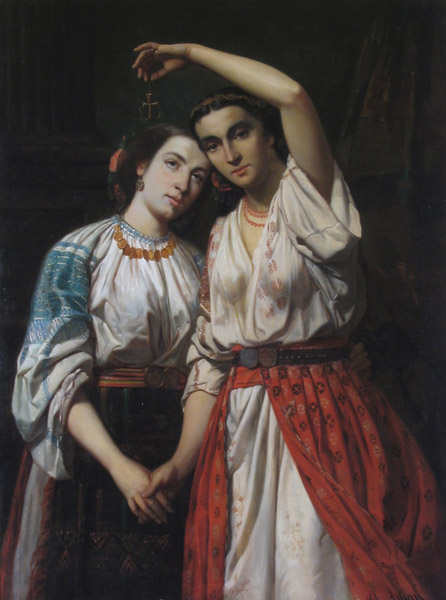
Union of the Principalities, July 1857 painting by Theodor Aman—personifications of Moldavia (left) and Wallachia as maidens in national costume

Also fearing the growth of democratic unionism, Bibescu's party channeled the conservative vote, forming its own Unionist Committee on March 10 (March 22). This faction insisted on maintaining boyar representation; however, Bibescuists also claimed authorship for the core unionist program, accusing the Kretzulescu group of plagiarism. In their version, it included references to a hereditary monarch, or Domnitor; representative government and meritocracy; a limited Ottoman rule with adherence to the Capitulations; and full respect for the property rights. This was a significant moment in history, signaling that the staunchest conservatives had renounced the notion of boyar-only representation, and only slightly amended the language of liberal ideologists. Hoping to attract support from the lower classes, they also reputedly promised a confiscation of monastery land. Bibescu himself held no official seat on the organization, which was nominally headed by Catargiu, Ioan Emanoil Florescu, and Scarlat Bărcănescu.

Before April, some conservatives quit this group to join Kretzulescu's Committee, which now clarified its stance by declaring itself against land reforms. Bibescuists remained especially strong at Craiova, where party organizers included Emanoil Quinezu and Nicolae Haralambie. Bibescu himself was welcomed in triumph by the city, but remained hesitant about capturing the unionist movement for his own goals. In April, however, Quinezu displayed his conversion to liberal radicalism. Alongside Petru "Pera" Opran, he put out the draft of a constitution which rejected any attempted return of Regulamentul Princes. He created an especially vibrant unionist cell and electoral committee, which also comprised figures such as Barbu Bălcescu, Gheorghe Chițu, and Grigore Lăceanu; together, they put out a nationalist paper, Vocea Oltului. They ended up rejecting Bibescu, whom they found to be "timid".

In May, Konstantin Basily arrived in Bucharest to observe the situation on Russia's behalf. He was welcomed by the Bibescu party, whose members complained that Costaforu was inciting an anti-boyar revolution in the provinces. Basily was upset, and demanded that Costaforu tone down his party's propaganda; Costaforu diverted attention from his own radicalism by informing him that Bibescu had preemptively endorsed secularization. Basily became disappointed by both camps, promising them that Russia would never allow for monastery land to be confiscated. Știrbei, meanwhile, also published a constitutional project with virtually the same proposals as Kretzulescu's. The Caimacam party also reemerged, once Bosianu again withdrew from the National Party venture, establishing his own Unionist Committee, and hoping to elect Dimitrie Ghica as Prince. Very few joined him, since, at the time, the Beizadea himself supported the notion of electing a foreigner. Bosianu established his own newspaper, called România. It depicted itself as a moderate and dispassionate voice in politics, and on such grounds presented arguments in support of the common unionist platform; by June, Bosianu himself had endorsed the project to import a Western European ruling house.

On March 11 (March 23), 1857, the Austrians evacuated Bucharest, and the longest ever campaigning in Romanian political history began officially. Its staples now included political imagery. At an early stage, most unionist propaganda art was produced by Constantin Lecca, with historical scenes that reminded Wallachians about an earlier union, under Michael the Brave. In July 1857, the debuting painter Theodor Aman of Craiova completed an allegorical canvass, the Union of the Principalities. Hailed as a milestone in patriotic artistry, it was followed soon after by mass prints of Petre Alexandrescu's similarly titled piece. Aricescu and Rucăreanu's work in theater was taken up in Bucharest by brothers Costache and Iorgu Caragiale. Their vaudevilles ridiculed an emerging mass panic, according to which a comet would strike Wallachia before the union could take place. Concordia had by then won the adherence of a Știrbeist poet, Grigore Alexandrescu, who contributed propaganda such as this March 30 piece:

Când citim în vechea carte a istoriei străbune,
Virtuți mari, ilustre fapte ale nației române,
Care inimă stă rece? Care suflet nemișcat?
Cine n-are dor să vază țara sa în fericire,
Cu legi bune, cu legi drepte, în tărie și-n unire,
Cultivând artele păcii pe al său tărâm bogat?

Translation:

Reading that old cherished volume of Romanian history,
Showing multitudes of virtues and our great vitality,
Which soul will remain unshaken? What heart wouldn't feel that twitch?
Who does not want our country to emerge as bright and fair,
Strong, well-governed into justice, and united as one pair,
Peace and industry creating, on this soil that is so rich?

The democratic side of unionism was by then completely free to organize, and its most radical proponents, C. A. Rosetti and Christian Tell, regained Bucharest during June. Highly popular with what Bălăceanu called the "socialist youth", they joined Concordia and shunned Timpul. As reported in late 1857 by a disgruntled Bolintineanu, radical émigrés "are creating intrigue and division". Elsewhere, differences of opinion between the unionists were muted by agreements between voters. For instance, all 292 voters registered in Vlașca vowed to support the candidate deemed best during Unionist Committee primaries. In that context, very few Wallachians still rejected union, and those who did never formed a party of their own. As noted by historian A. D. Xenopol, they included Colonel Dimitrie Papazoglu, and also those boyars who feared competition from the more numerous Moldavians for the ranks and offices of the court. Opposition to the unionist project came from the outsiders Heliade and Rusu Locusteanu. They endorsed the union on principle, but objected to the Divans being convened by the Porte; overall, they also favored a crowned republic under a native ruler.

== Results ==
The principles behind the suffrage were first put to the test in the Moldavian election of July, where conflicts opposed an anti-unionist Caimacams, Teodor Balș and Nicolae Vogoride, to the National Party. Attempts to repress Moldavian unionism were exposed in Wallachia by Petre Ispirescu, who published Vogoride's secret correspondence. Though Ispirescu spent time in jail for this breach of censorship laws, the plot's exposure alienated Wallachian conservatives, who denounced Vogoride as a conspirator. Another clampdown was signaled by the closure of Stéoa Dunărei, which reappeared from Brussels with Nicolae Ionescu as editor. The prolonged dispute culminated in attempted fraud by Vogoride and an election boycott by the unionists. This tactic invalidated the scrutiny there, and Moldavia had its own repeat election in September. Unbeknown to the Romanian unionists of both countries, in August 1857 Britain and France agreed not to recognize union, regardless of the election results. However, the unionists could still count on unofficial backing by their French contacts, who hinted that all one had to do to obtain the union was to get the mass of the people to vote for it. Russia also kept favorably neutral: Basily condemned Vogoride's act, privately expressing hopes that a politically diverse landscape would weaken Ottoman control of both countries.

"Severe and sound" supervision by the Caimacam ensured that election in Wallachia was beyond reproach. Ghica also postponed the final date of voting from September 17 (New Style: September 29) to September 21 (October 3). The results came in as a landslide for the unionist camps: according to Stéoa Dunărei, a near-complete count revealed that "only 3 or 4 deputies were doubtfully unionist, but even they will likely follow the general mood"; all of the 17 second-class peasant deputies were selected from among National Party affiliates. This was similar to the concurrent Moldavian election, where a minuscule number of the September Divan were separatists. C. A. Kretzulescu and party colleague Grigore N. Filipescu were elected as grand boyars for Brăila County, part of an all-unionist sweep which also gave seats to Mihalache Marghiloman, Marcu N. Dulie, and the peasant Stroe Ivașcu. Of the prominent revolutionaries in Wallachia, Ion Brătianu won by four votes in the landowners college at Argeș, while Rosetti took a seat for the bourgeois class at Bucharest. Two of the three Bucharest seats also went to Concordia men, with only one taken by a Ghica partisan, the merchant Dimitrie Culoglu. Dimitrie Brătianu won the seat at Pitești, taking all 78 bourgeois votes, with Scarlat Turnavitu as peasant deputy; in neighboring Muscel, Alexandru and Ștefan Golescu, alongside Aricescu, were among the elected (although Aricescu's victory was touched by allegations of fraud).

The same trend was observed throughout the country, with Basily noting that the "men of '48" and the "unhinged" were in control of the Divan. Nicolae Golescu came first in the Bucharest constituency, taking 1,004 votes, while Magheru took a seat as a great landowner for Gorj County. Serrurie won the vote of Giurgiu city constituents; with the other Vlașca deputies being Aga Emanuel Lahovari and Paharnic Nae Tătăranu (for the boyars), Postelnic Constantin Rădulescu (for the landowners), and Stan Panaiti (for the peasantry). Winners for the National Party also included, among the boyars of Teleorman, Captain Eliodor Lapati and Nicolae Butculescu, with both Marghiloman and Robescu elected for Râmnicu Sărat County. Guilds also gave their votes to former revolutionaries, including Iancu Ionașcu at Slatina and Constantin T. Grigorescu at Ploiești.

The Caimacam was able to prevent his conservative critics from getting elected, in particular Catargiu. The unionist sweep was balanced by Olt, which elected unionists Constantin Tănase and Iancu Ionașcu, along with the arch-conservative Ioan Solomon, and the non-affiliated Constantin Văleanu and Ioan Slăvițescu. The Solomon family, which had a hold on the county, attempted to replace Tănase with the more conservative Ioan Niculescu; arrested for fraud, then exonerated, Tănase was able to take his seat in the Divan during November. Ialomița also contrasted the general trend, having elected as a boyar deputies Ioan C. Roset—a member of the Caimacam party who initially announced that he would not endorse the union; and Bibescu's son-in-law, Aga Alexandru Emanoil Florescu, who declared that he would. Ialomița's richer peasant category had sent Răducanu Cucuti, a supporter of the Caimcam, while the other deputies, Stoica Radu Cojocariu and Ion Vasile, declared for the National Party.

Other prominent conservatives elected to the Divan included Princes Bibescu and Știrbei. Both ran at Buzău, but lost by large margins: Bibescu had 11 votes, and Știrbei 2, whereas the winners, Nicolae Pâcleanu and Scarlat Voinescu, had 49 and 44, respectively. The latter two, alongside fellow delegates Constantin Ciochinescu and Nae Stănescu, were pledged to the National Party—Pâcleanu had only arrived there as a supporter of Caimacam Ghica. Both former Princes were able to recover from this setback: as titular grand boyars, they could still run in two or more constituencies, taking Divan seats at Dolj. Știrbei also ran (and lost) in Vâlcea County, where the boyar seats went to Logothete Ioan Oteteleșanu (who had nearly been invalidated over questions regarding his estate outside Bălcești) and Nicolae Lahovari. Both were contested by conservative voters, as was the peasant deputy Stamate Budurescu (allegedly a career criminal). The issues subsided when all deputies, most of whom were unaffiliated, agreed to support the shared platform of conservative and progressive unionists.

In the church sections, the bishops led campaigns for or against union. As early as April 1857, Calinic, the Bishop of Râmnic, described union as "the crowning of our battles and of the blood we shed for the Cross", pushing his monks to vote in favor; Metropolitan Neofit II was more reserved about his opinions at that stage, and described by church historian Natalia Manoilescu-Dinu as "duplicitous". Calinic's enthusiasm was replicated by Filotei, the Bishop of Buzău, who openly adhered to the National Party platform. Clergymen elected in their respective class included four protopopes, represented four sees: Constantin of Râmnic (a "fully committed partisan of the Union"), Iancu of Bucharest, Constantin of Argeș, and Vasile of Buzău. Other seats were taken by Atanasie Stoenescu of Sadova Monastery and Ieronim of Bistrița.

Wallachia's ad hoc Divan opened on September 29 (October 10), seven days after its Moldavian counterpart. The rainy weather did not chase away the crowd gathering in a show of support on Dealul Mitropoliei, Bucharest. The celebration lasted into the night, with Bucharest festively lit with the newly introduced gas lighting and adorned with the National Party's slogans. The Divan's first session saw enthusiastic speeches, including one by Rosetti which ended with shouts of Trăiască România! ("Long Live Romania!"). It subsequently organized itself: two committees were set up to validate the deputies and come up a parliamentary procedure; one was chaired by Grigore Gr. Ghica. Metropolitan Neofit was, ex officio, the Divan's president, and tacitly endorsed the union, with N. Golescu elected vice president by a large margin. The Divan's secretaries included D. Brătianu (elected with 85 votes), C. A. Kretzulescu, Rosetti, Turnavitu, Ștefan Golescu, and Bosianu. Iancu Ionașcu oversaw the official printing office.

County deputies
| County | Landowners (1) | Landowners (2) | Peasants (1) | Peasants (2) | Burghers (1) | Burghers (2) | Burghers (3) | Burghers (4) |
| Argeș | Ștefan Burchi | Ion Brătianu | Scarlat Turnavitu | Teodosie (Tudose) Mugescu | Dimitrie Brătianu | N/A | N/A | N/A |
| Brăila | Constantin A. Kretzulescu | Grigore N. Filipescu | Marcu N. Dulie | Stroe Ivașcu | Mihalache Marghiloman | N/A | N/A | N/A |
| Buzău | Nicolae Pâcleanu | Scarlat Voinescu | Constantin Ciochinescu | Costache Moglan | Nae Stănescu | N/A | N/A | N/A |
| Dâmbovița | Costache Costescu | Evghenie Predescu | Hristache Fusea | Stancu Stănilă | Răducanu Ioan | N/A | N/A | N/A |
| Dolj (incl. Craiova) | Barbu Dimitrie Știrbei | Gheorghe Bibescu | Petrache Cernătescu | Nicolae Mazâlu | Nicolae Pleșoianu | Grigore Lăceanu | N/A | N/A |
| Gorj | Gheorghe Magheru | Zamfir C. Broșteanu | Christian Tell | Ioan Voicu | Barbu B. Gănescu | N/A | N/A | N/A |
| Ialomița | Ioan C. Roset | Alexandru Emanoil Florescu | Răducanu Cucuti | Stoica Radu Cojocariu | Ion Vasile | N/A | N/A | N/A |
| Ilfov (incl. Bucharest) | Grigore Gr. Ghica | Dimitrie Ghica | Ioan Brezoianu | Mircea Mălăeru | Nicolae Golescu | C. A. Rosetti | Grigore Joran | Dimitrie Culoglu |
| Mehedinți | Iancu Ipceanu | Grigore Miculescu | Constantin Cârjeu | Ioan Roateș | Dimitrie Viișoreanu | N/A | N/A | N/A |
| Muscel | Ștefan Golescu | Nicolae Rucăreanu | Alexandru G. Golescu | Tică Ioan | Constantin D. Aricescu | N/A | N/A | N/A |
| Olt | Ioan Solomon | Constantin Văleanu | Ioan Slăvițescu | Constantin Tănase | Iancu Ionașcu | N/A | N/A | N/A |
| Prahova | Constantin I. Filipescu | Ion C. Cantacuzino | Gheorghe Morcov | Ene Cojocaru | Cristache Polihroniadi | Constantin T. Grigorescu | N/A | N/A |
| Râmnicu Sărat | Grigore D. Marghiloman | Constantin Robescu | Constantin Cotescu | Gheorghiță Lupescu | Constantin Argintoianu | N/A | N/A | N/A |
| Romanați | Ștefan Vlădoianu | Stănuță Cesianu (Cezianu) | Gheorghe Cârjeu | Marin Pârcălăbescu | Ion Dimitriu | N/A | N/A | N/A |
| Teleorman | Nicolae Butculescu | Eliodor (Heliodor) Lapati | Mihail Pancu | Preda Cernat | Alecu Petrescu | N/A | N/A | N/A |
| Vâlcea | Ioan Oteteleșanu | Nicolae Lahovari | Nicolae Iancovescu | Stamate Budurescu | Nicolae Iancovescu | N/A | N/A | N/A |
| Vlașca | Emanuel Lahovari | Nae Tătăranu | Constantin Rădulescu | Stan Panaiti | Grigore Serrurie | N/A | N/A | N/A |
Based on full lists in Magazin Istoric, June 1975, pp. 16–17; and Clain, pp. 31–32 National Party and Caimacam faction Bibescuists Știrbeists Affiliation unknown/no affiliation

== Divan resolutions and disputes ==
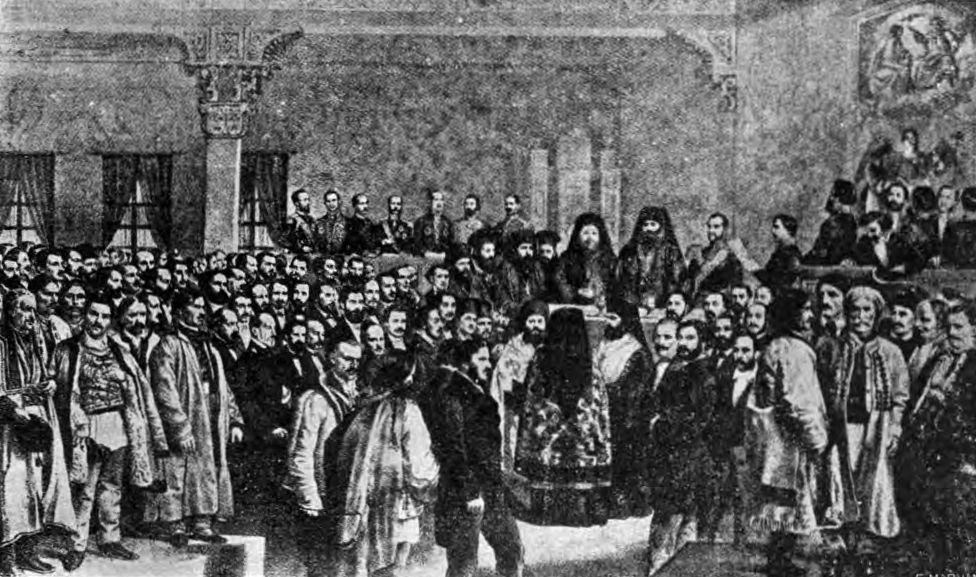
The ad hoc Divan of Wallachia in 1858, as drawn by Frédéric Damé

In Moldavia and Wallachia alike, the unionist camps of all hues agreed on the core agenda, with demands which they presented to the overseeing powers: the unification under the name of "Romania", with the election of a foreign hereditary Domnitor; increased autonomy toward the Ottoman Empire, with the (re)introduction of Capitulations; a new Divan with a fuller democratic mandate. Bibescu openly supported the election of Westerner, but for particular reasons: he argued that a European prince could not only pacify tensions between the classes, but also instill a greater political ideal. A main issue of contention between conservative and radical unionists was that of electoral law and philosophy: radicals such as Rosetti felt themselves bound by an imperative mandate, or "dutiful program", whereas conservatives rejected such notions as impinging on individual freedom. Persuaded by Concordia leftists, a majority of the Divan agreed on the notion of unicameralism, viewing upper houses as a throwback to the Regulamentul era.

News of the deputies' vote on union were received with much enthusiasm in both Bucharest and Craiova; the celebrations were witnessed by Aman, and are the source for one of his other political paintings. The four principles were drafted into a motion, carried by unanimous suffrage on October 21 (November 2). Its consultative function fulfilled, the Divan only survived to late December 1857, closing some days after the Moldavian assembly. By then, as the attention moved to social issues, the conservative and liberal factions were again emerging, and clashing. Robescu and other right-wing unionists signaled this by asking that positive references to the peasant revolt of 1821 be erased from the Divan's addresses. In October, Bibescu warned that party politics were the sordid future of the post-union era, "making this forsaken country of ours into an arena, collecting all her strengths and vitality".

In late November, more controversy was sparked by the letter sent to the Moldavian Divan, which A. G. Golescu described as "unbecoming and dangerous", initiating a public dispute with the other deputies. Two variants of the letter were eventually sent: a longer one, which made explicit reference to the two peoples "components of the same trunk, spread into several ancestries", as well as to their shared history, "even our [shared] name", being erased by the intrusion of foreigners; the shorter version simply acknowledged Moldavian primacy in upholding union as a "patriotic feat". Meanwhile, the Wallachian Divan continued to face dissent in its own ranks, particularly over whether its deputies could rule on the future organization of "Romania". In early November, Christian Tell and Ștefan Golescu attempted to replicate the Moldavian example and pass legislation which could see the Divan taking on more parliamentary responsibilities. They were defeated by a conjectural alliance of deputies, headlined by Dulie, Nicolae Rucăreanu and A. G. Golescu—a rift which ran through both the National Party and the Golescu family.

During the disputes, church deputies also blocked conservative advances by siding with the progressive unionist agenda, arguing in writing that its demands needed to be imposed on the European powers. In a private letter, Calinic made additional demands to condition his left-wing allies: that future rulers of the Romanian state were to be baptized Orthodox, and that parliamentary debates be carried out in a form of Romanian that lower-class deputies could follow. On November 27, Bibescu resigned and left the country, arguing that progressive elements, though a minority of the country, were "imposing their ruinous politicking on the majority". On the right, the Știrbeists were evasive on the topic of union: Știrbei and his son George Barbu were hopeful that they could preserve friendly relations with the Ottoman Empire, which they prioritized over the nationalist goals. Another major rift opposed the landed or urban classes to the peasantry. During the election, Conservatorul had alleged that peasants were not interested in the vote, describing peasant candidates to a boyar assembly as "sheep among wolves". In the peasant college of Vâlcea, interest in voting had been marginal, possibly a sign that this class did not find itself represented. In one Divan session, peasant deputy Gheorghiță Lupescu advanced a concrete proposal for direct suffrage. Described as untimely by Kretzulescu, it was withdrawn by its proponent; a motion was passed according to which the Divan would refrain from ruling on electoral matters.

As explained in a speech by Ion Brătianu, nominally a leader of the "far-left", all middle- and upper-class deputies agreed on not instituting or demanding universal suffrage. Overall, Brătianu advocated class collaboration for "the general interest", hoping not to antagonize the conservatives. The same ideal was championed by Vasile Boerescu in his newspaper Naționalul, published from December 1857: though discussing the peasantry's "precarious state", he also advised self-restraint on both sides of the social divide. In its final sessions, the Divan heard another plea from peasant delegates Tănase of Olt and Marin Pârcălăbescu of Romanați, who demanded "laws based on justice" and an increased electoral weight for the peasantry. Debates over the suspension of the corvée ensued, with the boyars advancing their own report. It restated that land used by the peasants was boyar property paid for in labor, and noted that mechanized agriculture and the resulting drop of labor costs justified maintaining and expanding the corvée.

== Aftermath ==
While Brătianu had officially embraced moderation and gradualism, radicalized members of the National Party, including Bolintineanu and George Crețianu, began preparing for reorganization as a secret society. On February 22, 1858, another firman officially dissolved the Wallachian Divan. Its text described the country as a "province and integral part" of the Ottoman territory, which caused consternation among the deputies; 24 of them signed to a letter of protest. It then fell on the European powers to evaluate the demands stated by both Divans. This they did in a new conference, delayed by the war in Montenegro and eventually convened at Paris in August 1858. The resulting Convention of Paris recognized the concept of "United Principalities" under Ottoman suzerainty. It designated the Domnitor as Hospodar, but did not allow hereditary rule and limited eligibility to local men of property, of any social standing, with a view to formally abolishing boyar ranks and titles. Under the Convention, both the thrones and the assemblies remained separate. The legislatures were only supervised by a quasi-federal Central Commission, meeting in Focșani, with attributions only in the matter of "legislation of common interests to both Principalities", having some elements of a constitutional court and an election commission. A technicality made it legally possible for the same person to be elected as ruler of both countries.

In 1857, Știrbei had advanced projects to drastically reduce electoral participation, seen by him as a meritocracy that discriminated between active citizens and purely governed ones. The Convention supplanted the firman of January 1857 in matters of electoral legislation, operating some major changes, all of them having a conservative bias, and cutting the electoral corps back to some 2,000 voters, less than half of whom voted directly. The five classes of both Principalities were replaced with two, of rural and urban voters, subdivided into groups which elected directly or indirectly; the voting age was lowered to 25, and the minimum property requirement was set as 100 ducats. Each county dispatched 3 rural deputies, of whom 2 were directly elected; cities and towns voted 1 deputy each, except for Bucharest, which had 3, Craiova and Ploiești, which sent 2. Candidates, who had to be aged 30 and possess 400 ducats to their name, could be elected in several constituencies at once, but were required to settle for only one.

In the rural constituencies, all those under 1,000 ducats could only vote indirectly—prompting members of the National Party to donate some of their land to landless colleagues, in a bid to increase their relative voting power; that threshold was set at 6,000 ducats in the cities, but property as defined for that class could include many forms of capital assets. Extreme discrepancies resulting from these requirements included Muscel County, which now had only 7 qualified direct voters in the rural constituencies, while its capital town, Câmpulung, produced 17 voters of all categories. In nearby Pitești, there were only 8 voters in all. In Moldavia, the same rules created an infamous paradox at Ismail, where there was only one qualified voter, Vladimir Stoica.

According to the Swiss traveler Johann Fridolin Herzog, Caimacam Ghica survived for the rest of his term as a "powerless plaything" of the boyardom, his executive power rendered null by their "petty intrigues". The political spectrum was again dividing itself, with moderates such as Costaforu and Boerescu declaring themselves placated by the Convention, while radicals such as Brătianu openly embraced the concept of an "independent Romania". Despite its anti-revolutionary bias, the new electoral law again produced a victory for the unionist camps, when it came to voting in the Hospodar. In Moldavia, the Elective Assembly was voted in in December 1858, and unanimously selected deputy Alexandru Ioan Cuza for the throne. In Wallachia, conservative unionism took hold with the triumvirate of Caimacams, favoring either Bibescu or Barbu Știrbei: Ioan Manu, Emanoil Băleanu, Ioan A. Filipescu. The Ottoman Empire supported Știrbeist conservatives, but reportedly kept neutral during the actual round of voting.

The Assembly of Bucharest was elected in January 1859, after which negotiations began about whether Cuza should also be put up as a candidate in Bucharest. The Caimacams made a final attempt at intimidation by ordering Eugeniu Carada to be arrested at Craiova. Although technically a minority in the new chamber, with the vast majority of delegates favoring Bibescu, radical unionists colluded to advance Cuza as the surprise option, and also stoked tensions between the various conservative unionists. Conservatives such as Caimacam Ghica and Catargiu reconciled with each other and also joined the National Party coalition. A guild of tanners entered the assembly hall and forced through the invalidation of seven conservative mandates, then stood their ground menacingly as Cuza was proposed and voted as Hospodar.

Both Bibescu and Știrbei were slowly made to reconsider under this pressure—they only ceded to, and voted for, Cuza under the assumption that the Ottomans would invalidate this personal union. The Principalities' merger and the name "Romania" were eventually recognized in December 1861, with Cuza styling himself Domnitor rather than Hospodar, and being referred to only as Bey by his overlord, Abdulaziz. The new firman also provided Cuza with sweeping executive powers, which he immediately used against his conservative Assemblies.
