= Scarlat Turnavitu =

Romanian schoolteacher and politician (died 1876)

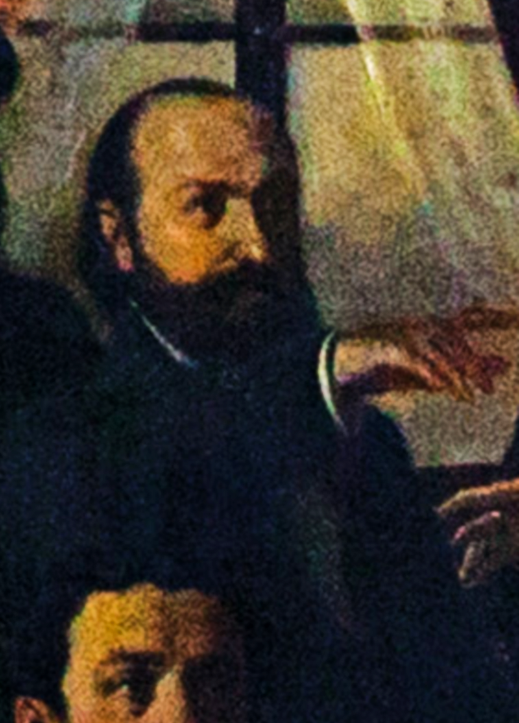
- Detail of an 1861 canvass by Theodor Aman, showing Turnavitu and other delegates in the Elective Assembly of January 1859

Commissioner (Prefect) of Râmnicu Sărat County
- In office c. June 12 – September 15, 1848
- Preceded by: Ion Brătianu (de jure); Scarlat Filipescu (de facto)
- Succeeded by: A. Borănescu

Member of the ad hoc Divan
- In office September 21, 1857 – January 1858
- Constituency: Argeș County

Member of the Assembly of Deputies of Romania
- In office November 1866 – March 1869
- Constituency: Muscel County

Personal details
- Born: c. 1816 Budișteni or Pitești, Wallachia
- Died: November 30, 1876 (aged 55–63) Bucharest, Principality of Romania
- Party: National Party (1850s); National Liberal Party (1875–1876)
- Profession: Schoolteacher, jurist, farmer, drink distiller

Scarlat or Scarlatŭ Turnavitu (transitional Cyrillic: Скapлat Тȣpнaвitȣ; also known as Turnavitul and Charles Tournavito or Tournavitou; c. 1816 – November 30, 1876) was a Wallachian, later Romanian, schoolteacher, politician, and jurist. He was born into a prosperous family with origins in the high-ranking boyardom, either in his father's village of Budișteni, Muscel County, or in nearby Pitești, Argeș County. During his youth, Wallachia and neighboring Moldavia were Romanian-inhabited tributary states of the Ottoman Empire, with a set of conservative laws imposed in the 1820s, as Regulamentul Organic. Turnavitu and two of his three brothers, Ștefan and Demostene, represented the liberal and nationalist opposition, whose principles they assimilated during their early education in Golești and Bucharest. They endured as lifelong associates of the Golescu family, whose younger members guided their political ascent. During the 1830s and early '40s, Scarlat traveled the country as a reformer, taking charge of primary schools and pioneering teacher education in Giurgiu, Buzău, and finally Craiova.

Turnavitu emerged as an organizer of a successful Wallachian liberal revolution in June 1848, when he created Craiova's National Guard and was sent as that city's envoy to Bucharest. In Pitești, the Turnavitus staged public burnings of Regulamentul and the register of boyar ranks. During an interval of anarchy in late June, Scarlat was present at the standoff between revolutionary supporters and the conservative Wallachian military forces, and afterwards convinced Neofit II Geanoglu, the Wallachian Metropolitan Bishop, not to take over as national governor. The consolidated revolutionary government, comprising his Golescu friends, made him Prefect of Râmnicu Sărat County, where he stifled counterrevolutionary movements, while following with alarm the Russian Empire's takeover of Moldavia. He tried to generate armed resistance, including as the Imperial Russian Army stormed into Wallachia, but was advised to the contrary by his superiors, and was ultimately captured by the Russians in Focșani.

The deposed Prefect was held in Văcărești Prison, where he was reunited with Ștefan Turnavitu. While the latter recanted and was eventually pardoned, Scarlat became known and admired for his defiance. The post-revolutionary Wallachian Prince, Barbu Dimitrie Știrbei, tried to obtain clemency for him from his Ottoman overlords, and, even though he failed in this effort, he made sure to relax his prison regimen. Upon ending his six-year sentence, Turnavitu was hired by Știrbei as a judge in Argeș. Știrbei's successor, Caimacam Alexandru II Ghica, promoted him back into the boyardom, as a Serdar in 1857. By then, Turnavitu had joined the National Party, promoting the cause of Moldo–Wallachian unionism. He became a representative of Argeș's peasants in the ad hoc Divan after winning elections in September 1857.

Turnavitu was then sent to the Elective Assembly of 1859—thus contributing directly to the establishment of an embryonic Romanian state, the United Principalities. Initially a centrist partisan of Domnitor Alexandru Ioan Cuza, who served for a short while as a prosecutor, he became a tax resister, and was tried as such by Cuza's regime. He returned to politics after Cuza's ouster in 1866, serving for a while in the Assembly of Deputies, where he embraced left-wing nationalism and helped shape an outstandingly restrictive Romanian nationality law. Despite his opposition to bicameralism, his final offices included a seat in the Senate of Romania; he also moved from a position which endorsed Carol of Hohenzollern for the throne of Romania, to excusing the "Republic of Ploiești" conspirators and joining their National Liberal Party. He died in relative poverty, after prolonged disease, and remained a hero-like figure in liberal historiography; his memory was revived in the mid-20th-century by historical novelist Camil Petrescu, who depicted him as a slightly ridiculous figure, caught up in the events of 1848.

== Biography ==
=== Early life and teaching career ===
Scarlat was the second born of five children; brothers Ștefan, Demostene (or Dimostene), and Pashale, sisters Zinca and Lina. They were all born to Gligore and Tinca Turnavitu of Budișteni, which was then located in Wallachia's Muscel County, and is now part of south-central Argeș. The name "Turnavitu" suggests a link to the Ottoman Bulgarian city of Veliko Tarnovo, with an added Greek genitive. However, the 1838 census records the exceptionally wealthy Gligore as an ethnic Romanian and a squire (fecior de neam), meaning he could trace his lineage to the highest-ranking boyars, and enjoyed boyar privilege. In an 1876 obituary, C. A. Rosetti, who claimed Scarlat Turnavitu for his own brand of radical liberalism, contrarily argued that he "had been born a poor man, and has left us as a poor man."

The future revolutionary's year of birth is sometimes given as 1816, though historian Octavian Ungureanu notes that he was already aged thirty-five in 1848. Scarlat himself reported that he was fifty in July 1863; in the census, his father reported him as born in 1818. Writing in 1988, Ungureanu argued that Scarlat and two of his brothers (excluding Pashale) were all natives of a since-dilapidated house at No 25 Brâncoveanu Street, in Pitești. Folk tradition regarded this building as having once been the summer home of Wallachian Prince Constantin Brâncoveanu, for whom the street was named. The claim was dismissed by architectural historian Eugenia Greceanu, who believes that it was erected as an inn during the 18th century, then redecorated in neoclassical style by its 19th-century occupants. The area had an obscure history, but, as Greceanu proposes based on toponymic evidence, it could have functioned as a market for the powerful tanners' guild.

Ungureanu notes that one of the Turnavitu boys, Ștefan, was aged 28 in 1848, when he was also married—his godmother was Ana Racoviță, daughter of the local boyar and intellectual, Dinicu Golescu. Scarlat, Ștefan and Demostene are reliably attested as students of the school in Golești, the Golescus' eponymous estate, where teachers included known liberals such as Aaron Florian and Ion Heliade Rădulescu. Scarlat went on to study at Saint Sava College in the Wallachian capital, Bucharest. Despite being in a class with future distinguished intellectuals such as Nicolae Bălcescu and Ion Ghica, he earned special distinction, and by 1832 was one of the top students. Rosetti recalls seeing the Turnavitu brothers around 1835, when Scarlat would purchase the food they shared using money he earned as a tutor. While Ștefan embraced a career in commercial law, his elder took up teaching. Beginning on September 1, 1837, he was assigned to a school in the southern town of Giurgiu, as one of the few professionals employed in Vlașca County. He was upset by the absenteeism of other teachers, and also witnessed his school being heavily damaged in the earthquake of January 1838. Around 1838 he received an inspection from the ruling Prince, Alexandru II Ghica. According to one record of this encounter, the monarch could not convince one of the students to scribble down letters of the alphabet as a demonstration, until Turnavitu stared-down the boy into submission; this amused Ghica, who reportedly quipped: nu poate un vodă, ce poate să facă un dascăl! ("a voivode can't hope to achieve what a teacher will!").

Turnavitu managed to obtain higher rates of enrollment in teaching in 1839, when he was allowed to train peasants as substitute teachers, whose efforts he rewarded in food supplies (bucate); he was still unable to fill most positions, especially after villagers discovered that they were expected to supply the food themselves. On May 20, 1842, he presented his superiors with a proposal that all titled boyars in any locality be assigned to carry out inspections on all schools in their jurisdiction—the measure is known to have been adopted by at least some schools, in Brăila County. That year, Turnavitu was removed from his post and sent to the northeastern town of Buzău. According to a protest by his former peasant-students, who pleaded with Prince Ghica that he be returned to Giurgiu, he had lost his position because of intrigues by "our enemies", including a number of "publicans" and "tenant farmers". In 1845, Turnavitu was headmaster of Buzău's princely school, and also organized the training of local teachers. He was visited in October 1846 by the new Prince, Gheorghe Bibescu.

=== Revolutionary rise ===
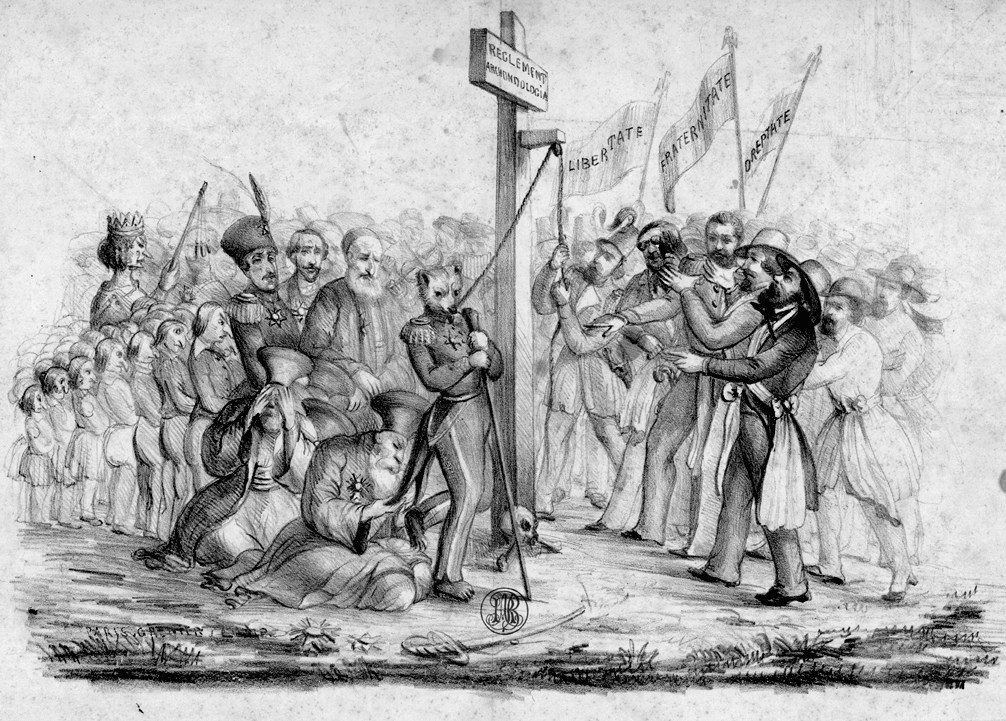
Revolutionaries destroying Regulamentul Organic and the Russian Bear, in an 1848 allegory

Later in the 1840s, Turnavitu was moving between schools in Buzău and Craiova—though he continued to reside midway between these towns, at Pitești; he was rewarded by advancement into the boyardom, with the rank of Pitar. The liberal revolution against Bibescu, which began in June 1848 at Islaz and spread to Bucharest, caught Scarlat in Craiova, as "a teacher in these parts". As recalled by poet Alexandru Pelimon, the "people of Craiova were organized as a national guard" by him, and he was subsequently their deputy to Bucharest, where he was to pledge support for the revolutionary government. The revolutionary message was taken to Pitești by a group of young radicals, including the Turnavitus alongside Toma Furduescu, Ion J. Mihăescu, Andrei Pretorian, and Ilie Trifonescu; this group issued revolutionary proclamations, also producing a full-sized Romanian tricolor and cockades of the same color scheme. The brothers pledged themselves to assist Nicolae Simonide and Furduescu, whom the revolutionary committees of Bucharest had installed as county leaders, and whose local government was located in the Turnavitu home. Ștefan was tasked by this new leadership with coordinating propaganda activities, and is described in some records as the county commissioner. At Pitești, he and Demostene organized a ceremony in which the conservative, Russian-approved, constitution, known as Regulamentul Organic, was publicly destroyed. Scarlat also took part in this, and personally set fire to the register of ranks, thereby annulling his own status as Pitar.

In late June, the Imperial Russian Army moved into neighboring Moldavia, whose parallel revolutionary movement had been crushed, and established a presence on the Wallachian border. On June 29, Bucharest's revolutionaries became aware that Moldavia had been taken, and either prepared for resistance or fled the city. According to a period testimony by the conservative Grigore Lăcusteanu, Scarlat Turnavitu was present in the city, and helped organize crowds as part of a showdown with the Wallachian military forces, which had been placed under reactionary officers Ioan Solomon and Ioan Odobescu. Turnavitu allegedly began "crawling on all fours" in front of the lined-up soldiers, while shouting: Fraților, nu ne omorâți, căci revoluția am făcut-o pentru fericirea poporului și pentru eliberarea lui de sub robia titanilor! ("Brothers, do not kill us, for we have accomplished this revolution for the people's happiness and for its liberation from the grip of tyrants!") These appeals, even though they were partly backed by Odobescu, failed to prevent the soldiers from loading their rifles; a massacre was only avoided because the revolutionary leader, Ion Brătianu, brought in Neofit II Geanoglu, the Metropolitan Bishop, to reason with both sides. Neofit, who had installed himself as governor in the confusion, was pressured by the populace to renounce his claim. According to Pelimon, Scarlat Turnavitu, alongside his former teacher Florian, was instrumental in obtaining the church's submission on June 30.

Before July 12, the revolutionary government sent Scarlat Turnavitu to the east of Buzău, as its commissioner (or Prefect) for Râmnicu Sărat County. The post had been deserted by Scarlat Filipescu, replaced by Brătianu, in name only, from June 28. The revolutionary Minister of Justice, Ștefan Golescu, wrote at the time that "we are very happy with [Turnavitu]." Historians see him as "intransigent in his dealings with the reactionaries, and a good administrator", rating him as a defender of revolutionary ideals. Upon traveling to his posting, he reported being greeted in all villages and towns by groups of people who wanted to know if the revolutionary order had been restored, and who were happy to hear that it was. Rosetti later recalled seeing Turnavitu himself struggling with guilt at having deserted his teaching position and his students.

Upon reaching his post in Focșanii Munteniei, Turnavitu relied on Moldavian informers to monitor Russian movements, while also sending in reports of the Ottoman Army's maneuvers around Brăila. In his official correspondence, he expressed his indignation that the Moldavian authorities in Putna County had banned the Romanian tricolor, and argued that the consequent freezing of cross-border relations was indicative that Moldavian reactionaries feared their own people. On July 18, he saluted the creation of Gheorghe Magheru's new revolutionary army, which was preparing to resist a foreign invasion from its base in Râmnicu Vâlcea; in his letter to Magheru, he stated his belief that a gathering of the "true patriots" could only lead to victory. He also informed the general that reactionaries and Russophiles were undermining the cause from within, claiming that he had dealt with them in his county. On July 28, Demostene volunteered for Magheru's army. He acted as a recruiter in Oltenia, and obtained the rank of Captain; Scarlat assisted him in the effort, sending in recruits from Buzău—including Captain Gheorghiță Nicolae; he ordered recruiters to walk around the villages in search of other would-be soldiers. In tandem, he began arresting men who instigated insubordination against the revolutionary government. On July 7, he and his right-hand man, Nicu Șonțu, captured Zamfirache Sihleanu and Tudor Popescu, accused of wanting to topple the commissioner. Other round-ups targeted Oprișan Iorgulescu of Râmnicu Sărat and Iordache Râmniceanu of Chiojdeni.

=== Revolutionary defeat and imprisonment ===
The revolutionaries' resolve was finally tested in September, when Wallachia was invaded—first by the Ottomans, and immediately after by the Russians. At Pitești and Râmnicu Vâlcea, Demostene gathered up survivors of the battle which had taken place on Dealul Spirii. As reported by Pelimon, Scarlat tried to put up some resistance to the Russian armies storming in from Putna. He could only muster "some tricolor flags and groups of villagers", although he also heard pledges of support from Russian deserters—he informed his government of this, but was ordered not to put up resistance. His area of operations fell under a Russian occupation, on September 15, with A. Borănescu assigned as the county leader; the deposed Turnavitu hoped to appease the Cossacks by crossing their path with a procession of peasants and priests. As noted in an 1850 propaganda brochure by revolutionary exiles, he had tried to appeal to the common denominator of Romanians and Russian sharing an Orthodox faith: "But these Orthodox [emphasis in the original], under orders from General Luders, trampled upon the cross and the Gospels, chased down and dispersed The People with their sabres and bayonets, and put priests in chains." A manhunt of the revolutionaries was carried out on the spot, with Turnavitu appearing as the county's third most wanted revolutionary figure—behind Șonțu and the woodworker Simion. He remained in Focșanii Munteniei. Though his fellow revolutionaries claimed that he voluntarily surrendered to the Cossacks "in order to endure the same fate as his compatriots", he in fact tried to hide at the French Republic's local consulate. He asked and obtained political asylum, but was found out in the consul's home and arrested, against the provisions of international law.

In October, Ștefan and Scarlat were reunited before the Vornic, who conducted their interrogation, and reportedly slapped them in front of others. They were for a while inmates of Văcărești Prison, in southern Bucharest, and also appear to have been held at Plumbuita Monastery, in the northern reaches of the city (the exact moment of their imprisonment in either facility is subject to conflicting accounts). The younger brother publicly denied that he had had any significant role in the revolution, recalling that he had been at Budișteni during the most significant phases, and had spent the time caring for his wife—who had fallen ill in the cholera pandemic. At Văcărești, Ștefan revealed that he himself was afflicted by tuberculosis, leading to his early release in the care of Colțea Hospital. A Golescu relative, Felicia Racoviță, recorded rumors of the interrogations, and reported in her various letters of early 1849 that "Charles Tournavitou" had never revealed any secrets, displaying "outstanding firmness" and refusing to answer as long as the general public was not allowed to hear him speak.

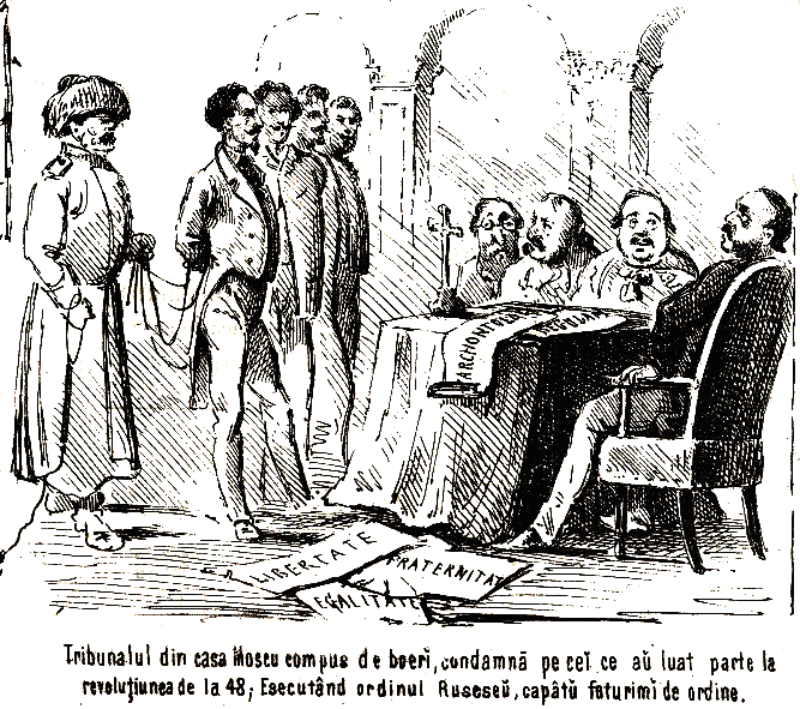
Participants in the Wallachian Revolution of 1848 prosecuted by Russophile "boyars". Political allegory of 1868

Rosetti notes that Scarlat was an object of admiration by other prisoners, and, increasingly, by the "foreign officials" who oversaw his imprisonment, since he mostly focused on educating himself and others. In one instance, he reacted to being manhandled by a Russian guard, imposing himself with the words: Robule, nu pune mâna pe omul liber ("Slave, refrain from touching a free man"). According to Ungureanu, he continued to be held at Plumbuita, then at Mărgineni, before facing a sped-up trial. The Wallachian High Court, created especially for processing cases of sedition, listed him as a "high-grade accomplice" in the revolution. It also noted that he had no intention of repenting, and that his replies contained vorbe proaste și nechibzuite ("nonsense and irreverent speech"); he had upset his investigators by defending his act of burning down Regulamentul, noting that he had obeyed the people's will. The Court, which reflected Ottoman and Russian priorities, was not appreciated by the newly installed Wallachian Prince, Barbu Dimitrie Știrbei. After analyzing the case of a rebellious youth, Alecu Petrescu, he had ordered for the prisoners to be kept at Mărgineni, which was among the milder institutions of its kind. Știrbei also wrote letters to the Ottoman Sultan, Abdulmejid I, asking him to pardon the lot. Abdulmejid agreed that most could be libertated, though he vetoed any such proposal regarding both Turnavitu and Petrescu.

On June 17, 1849, the Court sentenced Turnavitu to a six-year term of penal servitude, indicating that he was to be held in Giurgiu. More specifically, this verdict, which he refused to acquiesce with his signature, meant that he was one of several detainees employed on dredging the Danube's riverbed; one account suggests that he was instead supposed to work at a quarry in Snagov. Turnavitu's family, namely Ștefan with his wife, was finally allowed to visit him at Mărgineni and bring him supplies, after complaining that his health was deteriorating (a likely reference to his tooth infections, which were left untreated by the prison staff). Prince Știrbei was informed of this, and issued a decree that Turnavitu, along with fellow inmates Scarlat Voinescu, Tănase Macovei and Ion Rătescu, was to be dispatched to Boldescului Hospital in Ploiești. Both of the former two refused to accept the privilege, ceding their beds to other prisoners, whom they viewed as more seriously ill.

=== For and against Cuza ===
As noted by the fellow Muscel radical, Constantin D. Aricescu, Știrbei and his political associate, Petrache Poenaru, were making sustained efforts to ease the burdens on political prisoners, as well as arranging the employment of "intelligent and patriotic youths." Turnavitu only remained in prison to March 6, 1851; his pardon came while he was being held at Berca Monastery. By November, he had established direct contacts with Știrbei, recommending Aricescu for a government job. Aron Florian reports that the monarch had wanted Turnavitu similarly employed, as a means of rehabilitation ([ca să] poți da opiniune bună). The former prisoner defied him, asking to be made a Prefect, and not a lesser job—"in which I shan't be able to do a thing, and only make myself a laughing stock of the exploiters" (unde să nu pot face nimica și să fiu numai de râsul ciocoilor). Aricescu remained Turnavitu's informant regarding the clashes between progressives and supporters of boyar privilege (described by Aricescu as a clash between "dogs" and "wolves"), occurring within the state apparatus during the final portion of Știrbei's reign. In a letter of February 1855, Aricescu expresses support for the appointment of former revolutionaries as judges, seeing this as a means for securing reforms.

Also in 1855, Știrbei made Turnavitu his head judge in Argeș. Allegedly, this was after Turnavitu had declined appointment as Prefect, and upon "patriotic solicitation" from the Prince, that he should at least be sworn in as a magistrate. In the final 1850s, Turnavitu followed his liberal colleagues' Romanian nationalist agenda, centered on the Moldo–Wallachian union. As seen by Ungureanu, he was "at the forefront" of this movement. Granted a position as Serdar in 1857, when Alexandru Ghica, the 1830s Prince, was running the country as Caimacam, Turnavitu was recruited into the National Party. He then ran on its list at Argeș during legislative elections in September 1857, and, by September 21, had been confirmed a deputy in that county's first-level peasant college. Sitting on the validation committee in the resulting ad hoc Divan, he confronted his 1848 enemy, Solomon, who, as a Prefect in Olt County, was trying to pressure the peasant deputy, Constantin Tănase, into stepping down. Turnavitu's speech, described by historian Ion Ionașcu as "mordant", commended peasant electors for not giving in to Solomon's demands. On October 20, the Divan, with its nationalist majority, elected Scarlat as one of its secretaries—in which capacity he signed one of the Divan's first proclamations. His brother Ștefan was continuing the Turnavitus' close collaboration with the Golescus, acting as their political courier.

In January 1858, when Abdulmejid decided to call off the ad hoc Divan, Scarlat was one of the deputies to sign a letter of protest—this action is seen by literary scholar Augustin Z. N. Pop at marking a stage in which the advocacy of union became a "life-and-death struggle". A letter sent out by the Golescu matriarch, Zoe, in December 1858 reports that he was openly defying and embarrassing the new conservative regents. He was then reelected at Argeș for the Elective Assembly of January 1859, carrying the small landowners' college 15 votes to 6. This assembly formed the United Principalities, by assigning the Wallachian throne to Alexandru Ioan Cuza, already elected in Moldavia. Still a deputy over the following year, he came to criticize the agrarian census carried out by a pioneering statistician, Dionisie Pop Marțian. Scholar Gheorghe Stoica describes Turnavitu's arguments as "grotesque'; they included Turnavitu's claim that his own Argeș estates had been over- and undervalued by Pop Marțian. The unified state centralized its juridical institutions around the Central Commission, established in the former border town of Focșani. On February 13, it appointed Scarlat Turnavitu as prosecutor for the appellate chamber of commerce; this caused an uproar, pushing him to resign on March 15, ahead of parliamentary elections in Wallachia. As argued at the time by his former patron Ștefan Golescu (now serving as Commission chairman), Turnavitu was too unpopular and too mainstream—at a time when "far-left" liberals needed to be coaxed, so that Cuza could use them against a rising conservative opposition.

A while after, Turnavitu joined the opposition to Cuza's governments, refusing to pay his taxes. During July 1863, as a resident of Budișteni, he was interrogated by the penal court of Muscel, which took notice of his having allegedly forged the letter posted by tax collectors to read like it was from a racketeering hajduk, Radu Anghel. Turnavitu denied responsibility for this prank, which the tribunal investigated as fraud; he also denied the accusation that he was stoking "anarchy in the land", accusing instead the tax authority of doing the same, with its imposition of new taxes without proper deliberation. On July 6, 1863, the presiding judge, S. Alexiu, ruled that Turnavitu was guilty of tax evasion and contempt, sentencing him to four months in jail and a 1,000-lei fine. In September, his case was supposed to be revised by an appellate court in Bucharest, with Alexandru Emanoil Florescu as the presiding judge. Rosetti, who was also facing trial on similar charges, noted that Florescu was unjustifiably postponing the verdict and making Turnavitu attend frivolous procedures. This was at a time when the former revolutionary was supposed to be tending his estate, "which is Mr Turnavitu's only source of food."

=== Final activities and death ===
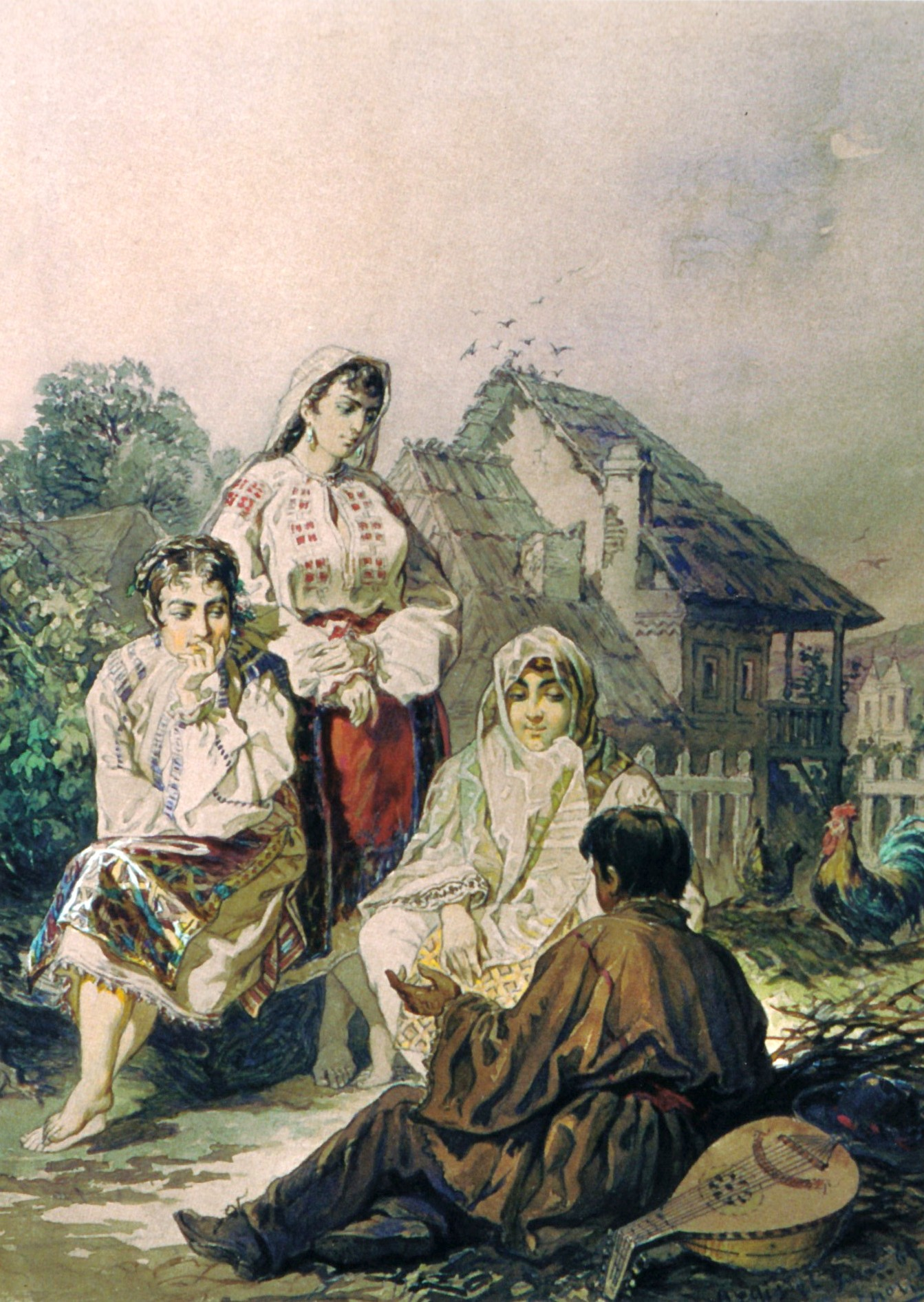
Peasants from Argeș County, as depicted by Amedeo Preziosi in 1869

Returning to politics later that decade (following Cuza's defeat by a "monstrous coalition" of right and left), Turnavitu ran for the new Assembly of Deputies at Muscel during the April 1866 race. At this stage in his life, he sided with a monarchist majority, comprising liberals and conservatives alike, which supported granting the Romanian crown to Carol of Hohenzollern, and thereby establishing a hereditary monarchy around a foreign prince. Turnavitu retook the seat in the repeat elections in November 1866, and was reelected in December 1867. He sat with the extreme liberals, and, while generally quiet during debates over the newly proposed constitution, he was one of six deputies who initiated a vote against the establishment of a Senate. In February 1868, he stirred controversy by welcoming the resignation of a Moldavian colleague, Vasile Alecsandri, who was also a distinguished poet. Deputies such as Nicolae Voinov and Alexandru Candiano-Popescu asked for the news to be treated with utmost seriousness, and the Assembly as a whole issued a petition urging Alecsandri to reconsider; Turnavitu, instead, argued that there was no reason to treat Alecsandri "with flattery, as if he were a child", and assessed that Alecsandri's renunciation of politics, returning him to literature, was "of service to the country." Around that time, he also backed legislation which made it unusually hard for one to obtain Romanian citizenship, arguing that foreigners needed to be completely assimilated into the Romanian mainstream before hoping to enjoy the full benefits of the law.

According to Rosetti, Turnavitu had ended up serving several terms in the Senate, and never gave up his position as a judge—though he was "weakened by disease", and generally confined to his "sliver of land outside Pitești". He was a distinguished distiller, with samples of his vermouth and țuică presented at the 1867 World's Fair. One of Rosetti's pupils, Emil Costinescu, relays an anecdote showing Turnavitu in 1868, at the side of a dying 1848 veteran, Ioan Deivos. Turnavitu consoled Deivos by outlining their shared existential triumph:

You and I have lived long enough, we may now leave in peace; we have seen our dreams fulfilled: we have witnessed the unification of our cherished lands; we now got to see an end to the squabbles over The Throne, with the arrival of that foreign prince we ourselves elected; I'll soon be joining you.

In August 1870, the retired former deputy was living in Pitești; he signed up to an open letter expressing support for the Second French Empire in its war against Prussia. Late that month, there was a round-up of political radicals supposedly involved in the "Republic of Ploiești" movement, directed against Domnitor Carol. These figures, who included Brătianu and Bogdan Petriceicu Hasdeu, hired a defense team that initially included Turnavitu, alongside Nicolae Fleva, Pantazi Ghica and Alexandru Sichleanu. In October, Turnavitu co-signed a letter thanking the jury for having returned a not-guilty verdict, which included the words: "We are jealous of you."

During the mid-1870s, Turnavitu was largely incapacitated by his disease—he was mostly living in a small apartment he had purchased in downtown Bucharest, on Antim Monastery grounds. In mid-1875, liberal and radical groups were merged into a consolidated National Liberal Party (PNL), formed by and around Brătianu. Both Scarlat and Ștefan Turnavitu registered as members that August, at Pitești. In his pledge, Scarlat called himself: "landowner, elector of the 2nd college, former professor, former prefect, former presiding judge, former prosecutor of the court, former deputy and former senator". He made a final attempt to return as the peasants' deputy in Muscel during the June 1876 race, but lost to Petre Zamfirescu, 122 votes to 99. He died in Bucharest on November 30, 1876; his funeral service was held at Saint Nicholas Orthodox Church on Calea Craiovei, upon which he was interred at Bellu cemetery.

== Legacy ==
The former deputy was survived by several children. One daughter was the wife or domestic partner of Tase Scărișoreanu. Their son became a Romanian Land Forces Colonel, and used "Turnavitu" as his surname. He served with distinction in the Romanian war of independence, and died in October 1904, while commanding over the Calafat garrison. His grandfather's memory had meanwhile continued to be cherished by the PNL old-guard. After the establishment of the Kingdom of Romania in 1881, the party itself was breaking into factions; Vasile Lascăr, who in 1898 represented the PNL's disgruntled youth, argued that his adversaries were retrogrades, who "go on and on about Turnavitu [and] '48".

Turnavitu was revived as a literary character in Camil Petrescu's 1848-themed novel, Un om între oameni. Commissioned by the Romanian communist regime to mark the revolution's centennial in 1948, it is seen by critic Mihai Zamfir as a mixture of authentic ethnography, with echoes from Petrescu's interwar themes, and layers of "rudimentary fashioned" Marxist historiography. Turnavitu features therein as a "romantic and exalted, somewhat ridiculous, youth, caught up in the mesh of his unrequited love for Tincuța, daughter of the priest Dumitru"; Petrescu also makes it appear that Turnavitu, rather than Neofit Geanoglu, was successful in talking down the soldiers from firing on the crowds. Scarlat and Tincuța end up marrying after he is promoted to revolutionary commissioner. The chapter which depicts the wedding also includes Petrescu's speculation about the Turnavitus' ancestry. Literary historian Eugen Simion sees the literary version of Turnavitu as partly modeled on a comedic character, Rică Venturiano, from Ion Luca Caragiale's 1878 play, A Stormy Night (itself intended as a jibe at Romantic nationalism). In its late stages, the communist regime also inaugurated a program of urban systematization. This resulted in the Turnavitu house being demolished in 1989 (just months before the Romanian revolution), alongside all other Brâncoveanu-Street townhouses, on orders given by Constantin Zanfir as leader of the Communist Party Argeș section.
