= Iuliu Maniu Square =

Square in Zalău, Romania

Coordinates: 47.178673°N 23.055260°E

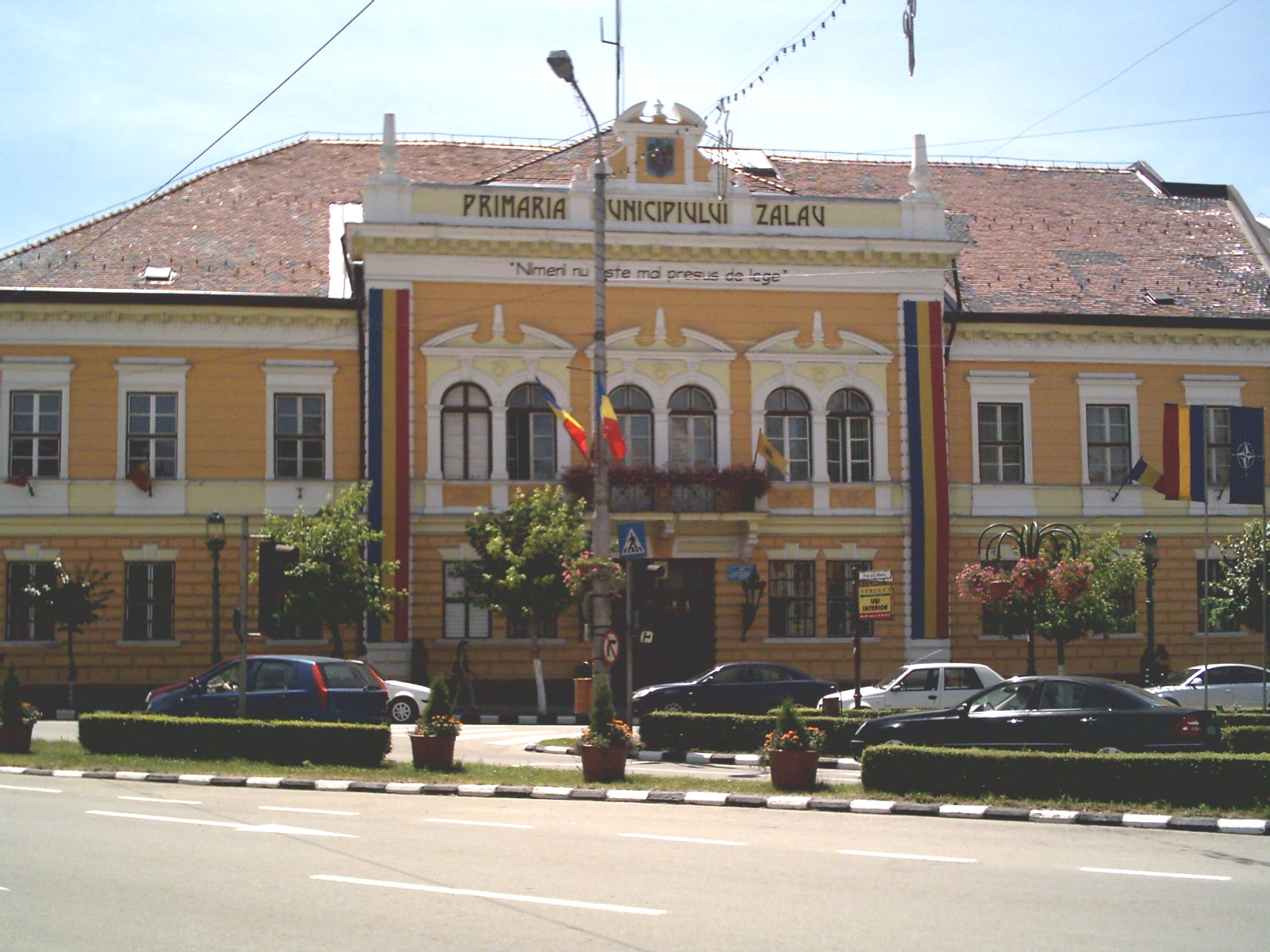
- Zalău City Hall
- Interactive map of Iuliu Maniu Square
- Operator: Zalău City Hall
- Visitors: Open all year

The Iuliu Maniu Square (Romanian: Piaţa Iuliu Maniu) is a major plaza in the Romanian city of Zalău.

It was named successively Kossuth Square (Romanian: Piața Kossuth) and Freedom Square (Romanian: Piața Libertății). The square shelters the most important banks in the county: BCR and Generali.

== Gallery ==
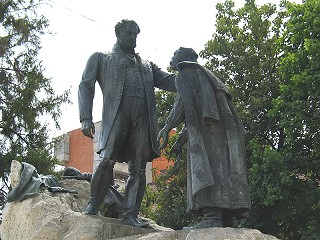
Wesselényi Monument
