= Liberalism in Romania =

Liberalism has been a prominent political movement in Romania since the 19th century. Romanian liberalism developed from the political movements associated with the Revolutions of 1848 and was mainly represented by the National Liberal Party (PNL), founded in 1875. A more radical strain of liberalism also developed during the 19th century, associated with figures such as C. A. Rosetti and George Panu.

Romanian Liberalism has changed substantially over time. During the 19th and early 20th centuries, liberal politicians combined the promotion of constitutional governments and economic modernisation with Romanian nationalism and, in some cases, exclusionary policies towards ethnic and religious minorities.

Liberal political organisations were suppressed during the authoritarian regimes established from 1938 onwards, and again under communist rule after World War II. Following the Romanian Revolution of 1989, the PNL was re-established and several other parties associated with liberal politics subsequently emerged.

== Origins ==
The origins of organised Romanian liberalism are generally associated with those involved in the Wallachian Revolution of 1848. The revolutionaries advocated a range of political and social reforms, including constitutional government, greater civil rights, administrative reform, and greater autonomy for the Romanian principalities.

The main politicians associated with this generation were Ion C. Brătianu and C. A. Rosetti, who both went on to become prominent figures in Romanian politics. Liberal politicians also participated in the movement for the unification of Moldavia and Wallachia and in the political systems established during the reigns of Alexandru Ioan Cuza and King Carol I.

During the 1860s and 1870s, several liberal factions operated in Romanian politics. These groups differed over issues such as the electoral system and the role of the monarchy.

== Formation of the National Liberal Party ==
In 1875, several liberal groups united to establish the National Liberal Party (PNL). The party became one of the two main political forces of the Kingdom of Romania, alongside the Conservative Party.

Under Ion C. Brătianu, the PNL played a major role in government during the late 19th century, where it developed new Romanian state institutions and liberalised the economy.

The liberal movement of this period was not ideologically uniform. Although its leaders shared similar general views on the promotion of civil and political liberties, suffrage remained restricted by property and income qualifications for much of the 19th century. It also frequently espoused nationalistic and discriminatory policies, particularly towards Jews. The 1866 Constitution of Romania limited naturalisation to Christians, excluding most Romanian Jews from citizenship, and most liberal governments maintained restrictions on Jewish residence until full political emancipation was achieved after World War I.

== Radical Liberalism ==
After the formation of the PNL, a more radical strain of liberalism began to emerge, with C. A. Rosetti being one of its main proponents. As a prominent figure within the PNL, he began calling for broader political participation and increasingly disagreed with Ion C. Brătianu over the extent of electoral and constitutional reform. After the constitutional revisions of the 1880s, Rosetti led a liberal dissident group against Brătianu.

After Rosetti's death in 1885, George Panu became the main representative of Romanian radical liberalism. Panu and his supporters advocated measures such as wider suffrage, agrarian reform and changes to labor legislation. The radical movement remained considerably smaller than the PNL, and eventually fragmented.

== After World War I ==
By the early 20th century, demands for electoral and agrarian reform were increasingly important in Romanian politics. The PNL eventually started supporting the introduction of universal male suffrage and extensive land reform, both of which were introduced after World War I.

Universal male suffrage substantially changed the Romanian political system and weakened the two-party electoral arrangement under which the PNL and Conservatives previously operated. The creation of Greater Romania, which incorporated territories won during the war, also affected this arrangement, having greatly enlarged the electorate and subsuming new political traditions. The PNL nevertheless remained one of the country's major political parties during the interwar period.

== Greater Romania ==
During the 1920s, the PNL played an important role in the political and institutional consolidation of Greater Romania. Liberal governments participated in the adoption of the 1923 Constitution and in the administrative and economic integration of the territories incorporated after the war.

The party's main competitor in this period was the National Peasants' Party (PNȚ), established in 1926 through the merger of the Romanian National Party and the Peasants' Party. The PNȚ was mainly an agrarian and democratic party rather than a liberal party, though it shared a commitment to parliamentary government.

There were various internal divisions within the PNL during this period, with different factions competing over the party's leadership, differing mainly on its relationship with the monarchy and economic policy.

Romania's parliamentary system deteriorated during the 1930s amid political instability and the increasingly authoritarian rule of Carol II. In 1938, he established a royal dictatorship, with many political parties, including the PNL, being formally dissolved. The king subsequently established the authoritarian National Renaissance Front as the country's official political organisation. Some politicians formerly associated with the PNL ended up cooperating with the new regime, while others fled the country. Political parties remained banned after the abdication of Carol II in 1940, when Ion Antonescu established a new Fascist regime, with Michael I as the king.

== Communist Rule ==
Following a coup d'état on 23 August 1944, political parties were once again allowed to operate. In March 1945, a government led by Petru Groza took office after pressure from the Soviet authorities. The PNL, led by Dinu Brătianu, and the PNȚ, led by Iuliu Maniu, subsequently remained in opposition, who faced increasing restrictions on its meetings and electoral activity.

The first election after World War 2 was held on 19 November 1946. Official results gave a large majority to the Communist-dominated Bloc of Democratic Parties with 70%, while the opposition received only 29% of the vote. The conduct leading up to and during the election were disputed by the opposition and by Western diplomatic observers, who reported extensive electoral manipulation and falsification.

In December 1947, King Michael I abdicated and the Socialist Republic of Romania was established. Independent political parties were from then on excluded from political life as the Communist Party consolidated one-party rule, including all independent liberal parties.

After the Communists fully got power by 1947 no official opposition remained with only neo legionary groups being the only ones.

While PNT figures like Iuliu Maniu tried to fled they were caught while trying to fly out of the country in the as it said in the Tamadau Affair:"Early on the morning of July 14, 1947, at the Tămădău airfield (located 46 km (29 mi) from Bucharest), Siguranța Statului and armed soldiers arrested a number of prominent PNȚ politicians, including Mihalache, Nicolae Penescu, Ilie Lazăr, Nicolae Carandino, Dumitru, and Eugen Borcea, all of whom were waiting for airplanes to transport them out of the country. "

After the incident all of them where found guilty for treason and spent the rest of their life's in jail.

With the majority dying in prison for example Iuliu Maniu dying in the Sighet Prison.

No other liberal pro democracy groups remained after this,only after the 1989 coup many returned or we're created.

After 1989, Iuliu Maniu became a simbol of anti communist sentiment and pro democracy groups in Romania but also got streets,bridges,squares and boulevards(Iuliu Maniu Boulevard-Bucharest-Sector 6) named after him.

== Liberalism after 1989 ==
Following the end of communist rule in 1989, the National Liberal Party (PNL) was re-established and became one of the main parties associated with liberalism in Romania. For most of the 1990s, the PNL was part of the Romanian Democratic Convention (CDR), a broad opposition coalition which also included Christian democratic, social democratic, environmentalist and civic organisations. The CDR won the 1996 parliamentary election and participated in government until 2000. Following the decline of the CDR, the PNL continued to contest elections independently or as part of other electoral alliances.

A further liberal and reform-oriented political current emerged in the 2010s with the creation of the Save Romania Union (USR). The party developed from the Save Bucharest Union (USB), a local political organisation established in 2015. The USB received approximately 25% of the vote in Bucharest in the 2016 local elections, after which the project expanded nationally as the USR. At the 2016 parliamentary election, the USR received 8.87% of the vote. In alliance with the Freedom, Unity and Solidarity Party (PLUS), it received 22.36% of the vote at the 2019 European Parliament election, and 15.37% in the Chamber of Deputies election in 2020. The PNL and USR both remain represented in Parliament after the 2024 election, with the PNL and USR receiving 13.20% and 12.40% of the vote for the Chamber of Deputies, respectively.

Other smaller parties associated with liberal politics include REPER, Force of the Right, the People's Movement Party and DREPT, although their ideological positions and relationships with the larger parties have varied.

== Presidents of the National Liberal Party (1875–present) ==
Nº	Name	Term start	Term end
1	Ion Brătianu	1875	1891
2	Dumitru Brătianu	1891	1892
3	Dimitrie Sturdza	1892	1908
4	Ion I. C. Brătianu	1908	24 November 1927
5	Vintilă Brătianu	November/December 1927	1930
6	Ion Duca	1930	30 December 1933
7	Dinu Brătianu	December 1933	1948
	none (party dissolved during Romanian Communist Party rule)	1948	1989
8	Radu Câmpeanu	January 1990	February 1993
9	Mircea Ionescu-Quintus	February 1993	February 2001
10	Valeriu Stoica	February 2001	August 2002
11	Theodor Stolojan	August 2002	October 2004
12	Călin Popescu-Tăriceanu	October 2004	March 2009
13	Crin Antonescu	March 2009	June 2014
14	Klaus Iohannis	June 2014	December 2014
15	Vasile Blaga	December 2014	September 2016
16	Alina Gorghiu	December 2014	December 2016
–	Raluca Turcan (acting/ad interim)	December 2016	June 2017
17	Ludovic Orban	June 2017	September 2021
18	Florin Cîțu	September 2021	April 2022
–	Gheorghe Flutur (acting/ad interim)	April 2022	April 2022
19	Nicolae Ciucă	April 2022	November 2024
20	Ilie Bolojan	November 2024	incumbent

== See also ==
- History of Romania
- Politics of Romania
- List of political parties in Romania
