= Iuliu Maniu Street, Cluj-Napoca =

Coordinates: 46.770141°N 23.590655°E

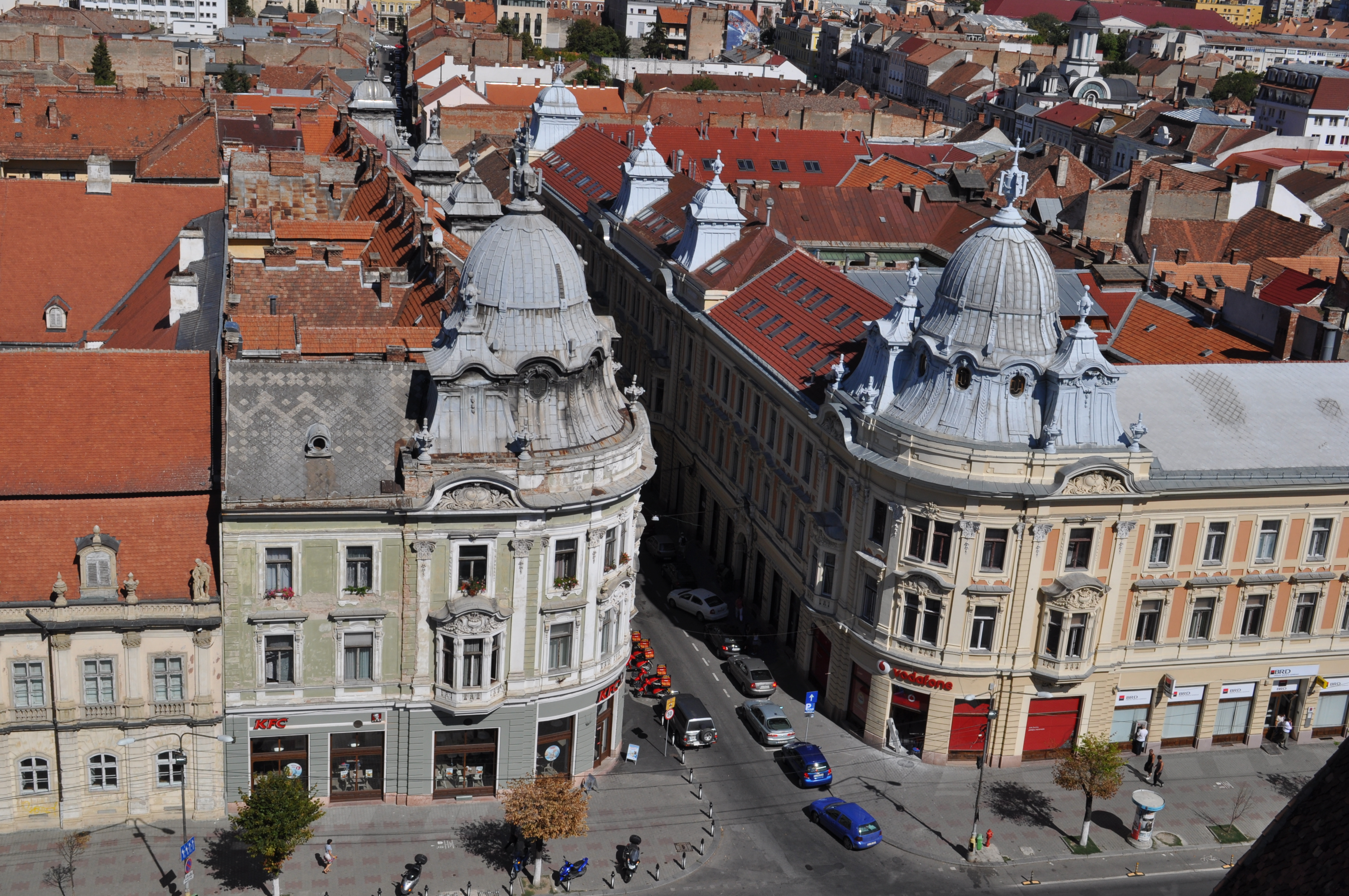
The street with two Baroque Revival palaces on it

The Iuliu Maniu Street in Cluj-Napoca, named after the Romanian politician Iuliu Maniu, is a central street in the Romanian city of Cluj-Napoca, connecting the Avram Iancu and Unirii squares. It is parallel to the Eroilor and "21 Decembrie 1989" avenues. The western part of the street— between the Unirii Square and Bolyai Street—was built during the 19th century in a symmetrical manner, featuring the eclectic architectural style, accordingly the Haussmann urbanistic trend. It is commonly called strada oglindă (mirror street).
