= Ioan Oteteleșanu =

Wallachian, later Romanian businessman and politician

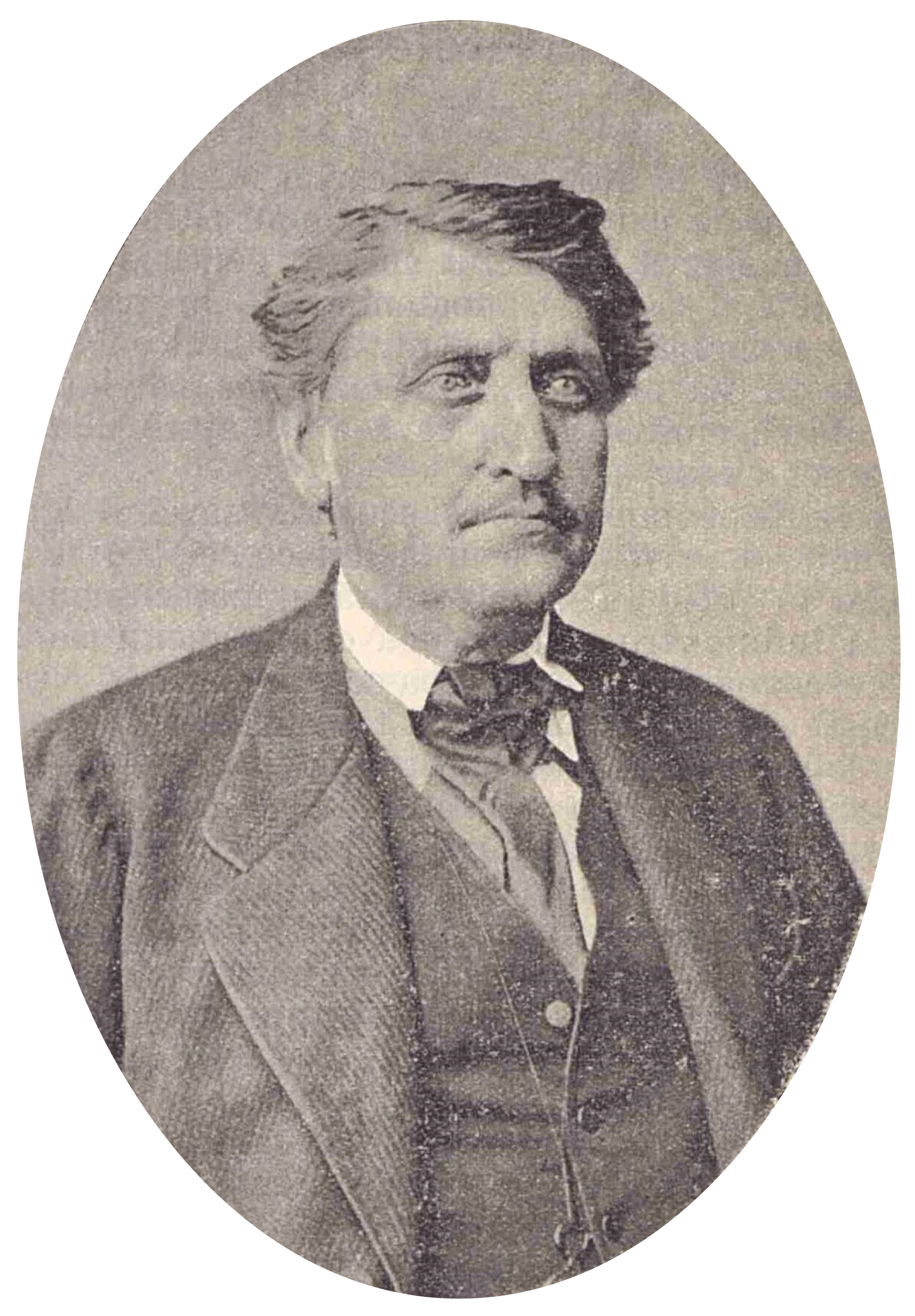
Ioan Oteteleșanu

Ioan Oteteleșanu (also Iancu; 1795–1876) was a Wallachian, later Romanian businessman and politician.

The son of sluger Constantin Oteteleșanu, he entered the magistracy in 1831. He was then director of salt mines from 1838 to 1841, amassing a large sum. From 1851 to 1853, during the reign of Barbu Dimitrie Știrbei, he was Audit Minister. In early 1866, he briefly served as Finance Minister under Nicolae Kretzulescu.

Oteteleșanu owned an estate and villa at Măgurele, near Bucharest. In his last will, written the year of his death, he left his entire fortune for the establishment of a girls’ school and orphanage. After the death of his widow Elena in 1888, there being no descendants, the estate management came under the care of Ioan Kalinderu.
