= Constantin D. Aricescu =

Romanian poet and revolutionary

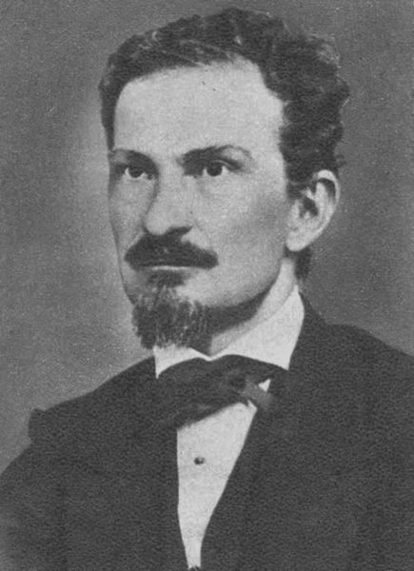
Constantin D. Aricescu

Constantin D. Aricescu (18 March 1823 –18 February 1886) was a Romanian poet, prose writer, playwright and revolutionary.

Born in Câmpulung, his parents were the serdar Dimitrie Aricescu and his wife Elena (née Chiliașu). His early education took place at home with private tutors and at the Greek and Romanian schools in his native town. It continued at Saint Sava College in the capital, Bucharest, from 1837 to 1844. After graduating, he worked for several months as an engineer's assistant, followed in 1847 by a low-ranking clerk's position at the Treasury. Later, he was editor and administrator of the newspapers Românul, Buciumul and Pressa and director of the State Archives, the State Domains and the State Press (1869–1870; 1871–1876). He was a school inspector in Ilfov and Vlașca counties, as well as in Bucharest.

Aricescu's literary debut, the poem "Adio la Colegiul Național Sf. Sava (La corpul profesoral)", was published in 1846 in Curierul românesc. His first volume of poetry, Câteva ore de colegiu, appeared the same year. His contributions appeared in Foaie pentru minte, inimă și literatură, Pruncul român, Românul, Zimbrul, Trompeta Carpaților, and Pressa. A participant in the Wallachian Revolution of 1848 at Câmpulung, he was a fervent supporter of the union of Wallachia and Moldavia, secretary of the local Unionist Committee and a deputy in the 1857 ad-hoc Divan. He was a prolific versifier who had noble intentions but lacked poetic talent. An occasional playwright, he had a certain perceptiveness when it came to creating dialogue. Aricescu's prose work is more interesting, especially his historical writings (particularly the 1874 Istoria revoluțiunei române de la 1821) and his memoir pieces, sometimes naive and emphatic, but written with vigor and in places showing a genuine aptitude for pamphleteering. The ambitious novel Misterele căsătoriei, a dense pastiche published in three volumes between 1861 and 1886, was less well executed.
