= Zalău City Hall =

- Primăria Zalău
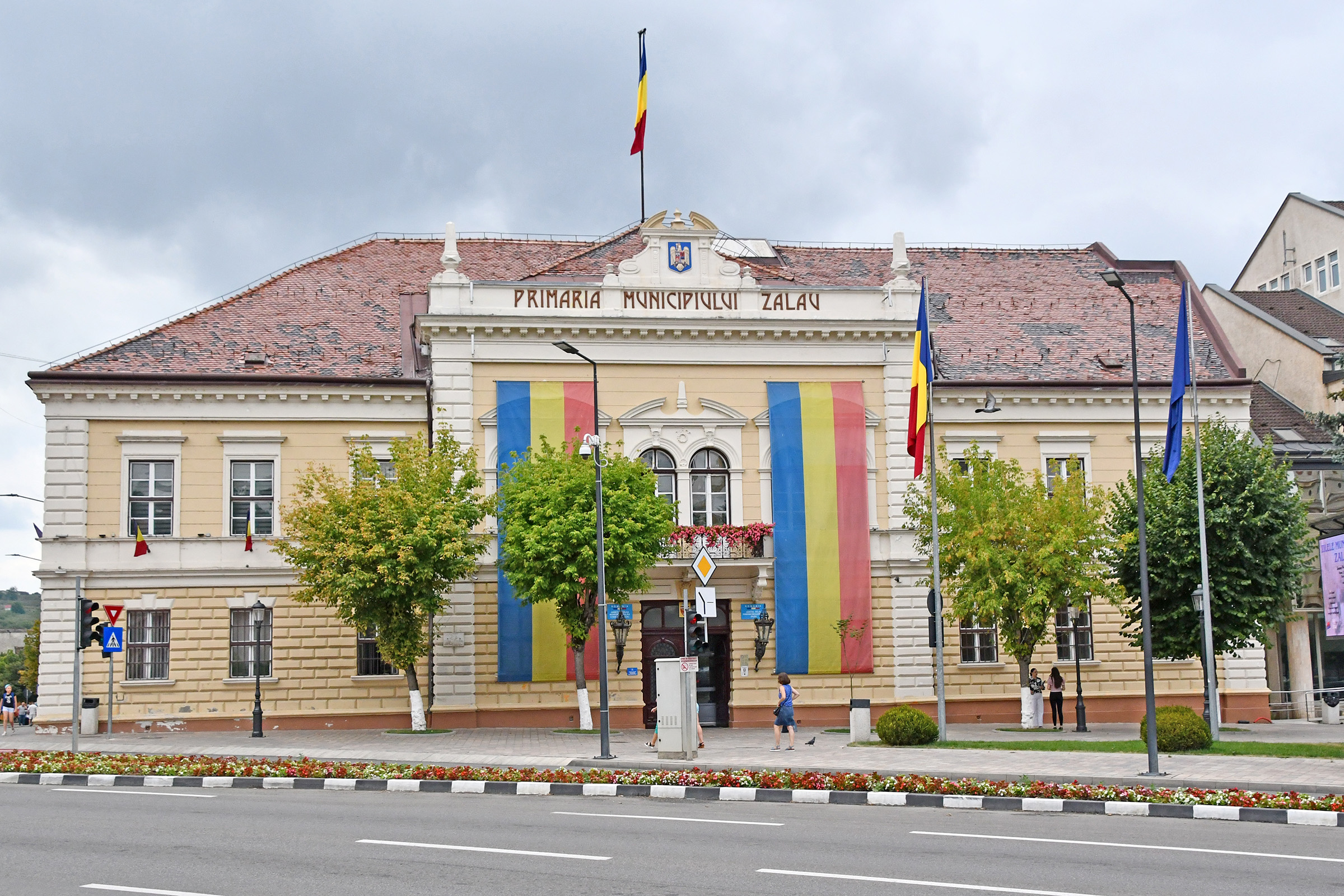
- Zalău City Hall

General information
- Address: Iuliu Maniu Square
- Town or city: Zalău
- Country: Romania
- Coordinates: 47.1782°N 23.0552°E
- Completed: 1889

The Zalău City Hall (Romanian: Primăria Zalău) is a building in Zalău which was built in 1889.

== History ==
In 1876, the city of Zalău was designated as the capital of Szilágy County. The building originally served to house the Court and Prosecutor's office of the county. The trapezoidal building has three external entrances and an interior yard.
