= National Party (Romania) =

The Partida Naţională din Ţara Românească (English: National Party of Wallachia) was a Romanian political organization active in the period of 1837–1848 in the Danubian Principalities, made up of the boyars who opposed foreign interference. It was established by Ion Câmpineanu. It was a loose group which helped to popularize Romanian nationalism, and finally the union of the Principalities.

== See also ==
- Liberalism and radicalism in Romania

== Sources ==
- Mihuţ, Cosmin. Partida naţională din Ţara Românească şi marile puteri: 1838-1842. Universitatea Alexandru Ioan Cuza, 2015.
- Mihuţ, Cosmin. "PARTIDA NAŢIONALĂ DIN ŢARA ROMÂNEASCĂ (1837− 1840). IDENTITATE IDEOLOGICĂ ŞI MANIFESTĂRI ÎN SPAŢIUL PUBLIC." Anuarul Institutului de Istorie» AD Xenopol «-Iaşi 52.52 (2015): 229-244.
- Mihuţ, Cosmin. "PARTIDA NAŢIONALĂ DIN ŢARA ROMÂNEASCĂ ŞI MARILE PUTERI (1838-1840)." Anuarul Institutului de Istorie» AD Xenopol «-Iaşi 51.Supl. 2 (2014): 55-72.
- Vlad, Laurenţiu. "Conservatorismul politic românesc (secolele XIX-XX). Scurtă istorie a cuvintelor, ideilor şi partidelor." Analele Universităţii din Bucureşti. Seria Ştiinţe Politice 12.12 (2010): 35-49.
