= Ad hoc divans =

National assemblies in Moldavia and Wallachia

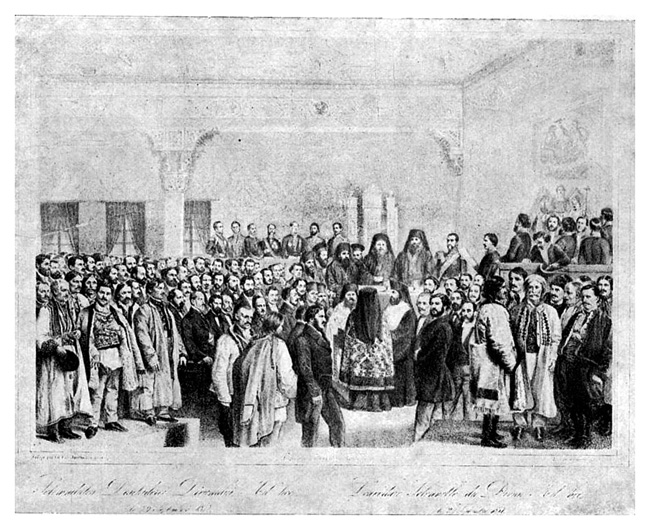
Ad hoc Divans in Bucharest, 1857

The two ad hoc divans were consultative assemblies of the Danubian Principalities (Moldavia and Wallachia), vassals of the Ottoman Empire. They were established by the Great Powers under the Treaty of Paris. By then, the Crimean War had taken the two states out of Russia's sphere of influence, and had nullified the Moldo-Wallachian Regulamentul Organic regime. Officially, the two assemblies were provisional replacements for the traditional assemblies, the Sfaturi (or Divanuri). The term "divan", is derived from the Ottoman rule, being the name of a high governmental body in a number of Islamic states.

The elections for the two Divans confronted two local movements: the National Party, which supported the unification of Moldavia and Wallachia, as "Romania"; the anti-unionists, which sought to maintain the status quo. The National Party emerged as the victor in 1859, when its candidate Alexandru Ioan Cuza was crowned Domnitor over both countries. The resulting United Principalities were the political embryo of modern Romania.
