= Golescu =

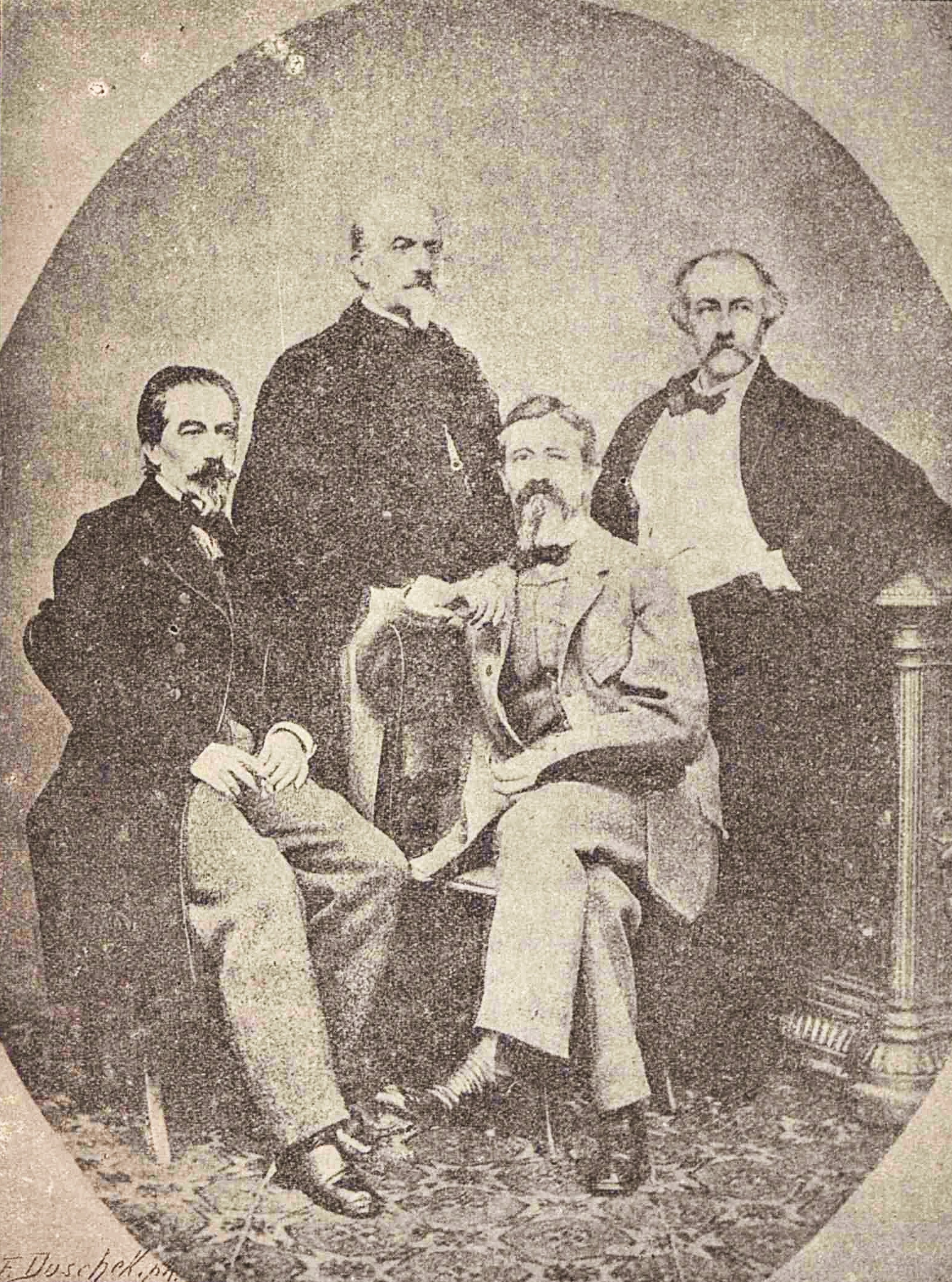

Golescu is the surname of a Romanian family:

- Stroe Golescu, or Stroe Leurdeanu (c. 1600–1678/9), statesman and intriguer
- Radu Golescu (1746–1818), statesman
- Dinicu Golescu (1777–1830), politician and writer
- Zoe Golescu (1792–1879), revolutionary
- Ștefan Golescu (1809–1874), politician
- Nicolae Golescu (1810–1877), politician
- Alexandru G. Golescu (1819–1881), politician
