= Golești =

Golești may refer to several places in Romania:

- Golești, Vâlcea, a commune in Vâlcea County
- Golești, Vrancea, a commune in Vrancea County
- Golești, a village in Bălilești Commune, Argeș County
- Golești, a village in Ștefănești, Argeș town, Argeș County
- Goleștii de Sus, a village in Cotești Commune, Vrancea County

== See also ==
- Schitu Golești, a commune in Argeș County, Romania
- Golescu (disambiguation)
