= Dinicu =

Dinicu is a Romanian surname. Notable individuals with this surname include:

- Grigoraș Dinicu (complete: Grigoraș Ionică Dinicu; 1889–1949), Romanian composer, arranger and violinist – grandson of Angheluș Dinicu
- Ionică Dinicu (born as: Ionică Dinu; ?–?), Romanian musician singer and lutanist
- Sile Dinicu (native: Vasile Dinicu; 1919–1993), Romanian composer, conductor, arranger and pianist

Dinicu is the Romanian forename of:

- Dinicu Golescu (Constantin Radovici Golescu; 1777–1830), a member of the Golescu family of boyars, was a Wallachian Romanian man of letters, mostly noted for his travel writings and journalism
