= Radu Golescu =

Wallachian statesman (1746–1818)

Radu Golescu-Știrbei
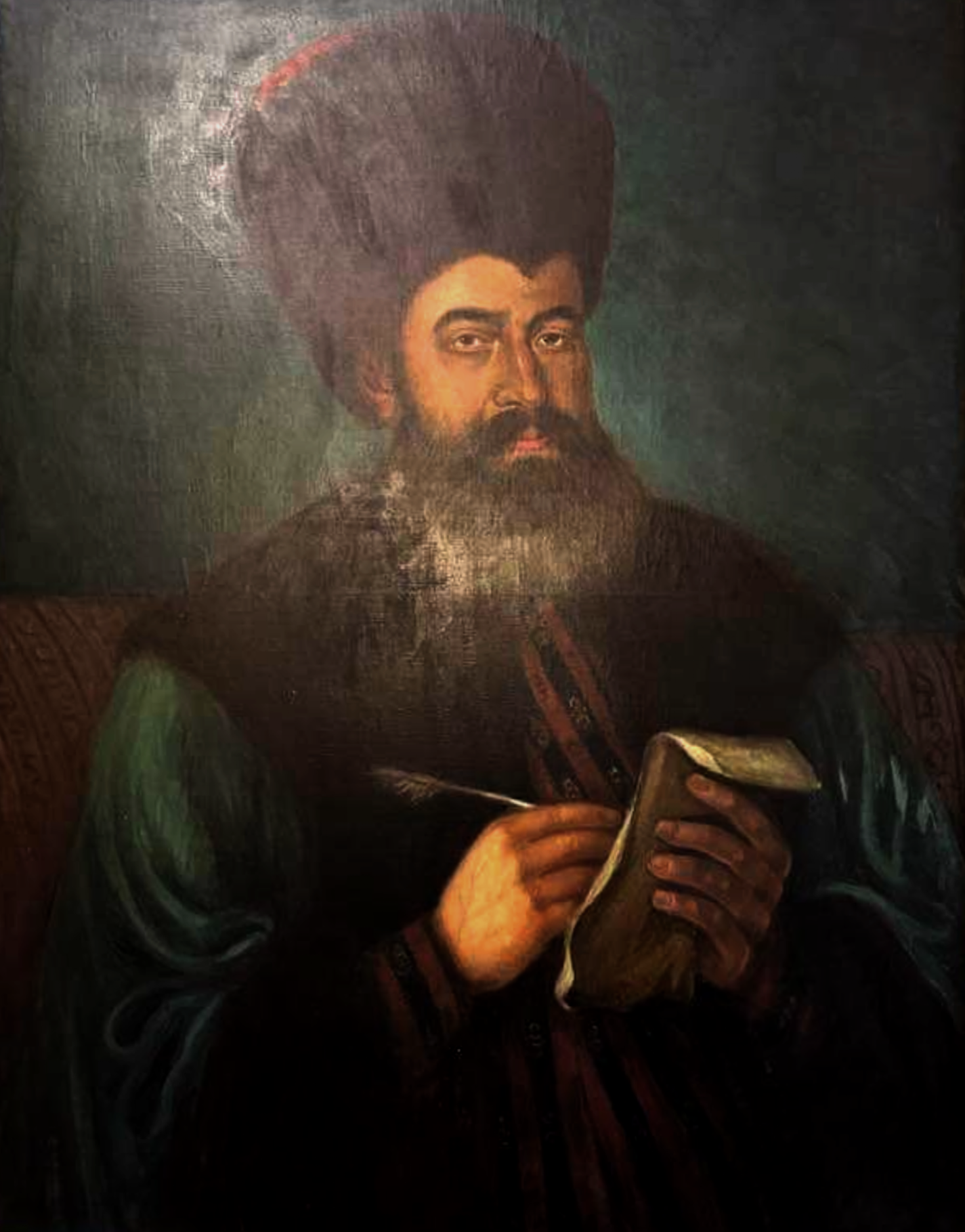
- Anonymous contemporary portrait, c. 1800

Great Ban of Oltenia
- Reign: 1799–1800
- Predecessor: Unattested
- Successor: Unattested
- Reign: June–August 1813
- Predecessor: Georgios Argyropoulous
- Successor: Constantin Crețulescu
- Reign: c. October 1818
- Predecessor: Unattested
- Successor: Unattested
- Born: 3 May 1746; Oltenia?, Wallachia
- Died: 8 October 1818 (aged 72); Bucharest, Wallachia
- Burial: Golești
- Spouse: Zoița (Zinca) Floreasca (died 1804)
- Issue: Iordache Golescu; Dinicu Golescu; Ianache Golescu; Ana Racoviță
- House: Golescu (Știrbei)
- Father: Nicolae Știrbei
- Mother: Anița Goleasca
- Religion: Orthodox

Radu Golescu-Știrbei, historically known as Radul or Răducanul Golescul (Cyrillic: Радꙋ̆л or Ръдуканꙋ̆л Голєскꙋ̆л; 3 May 1746 – 8 October 1818), was a Wallachian statesman, entrepreneur and philanthropist; he was the maternal grandson of Spatharios Radu Leurdeanu Golescu, as well as the father of the writers Iordache and Dinicu Golescu. His life, as well as his participation in government, coincided with the Phanariote reigns, by Greek or Hellenized Princes acting under Ottoman suzerainty. Himself educated in Greek, Golescu was a native boyar, and, like his sons, tended to side with the early manifestations of Romanian nationalism; he was especially prone to economic nationalism—though he alternated this commitment with episodes of participation in Phanariote spoliation, and was vilified as such by Wallachia's taxpayers. Before his political ascent, he established reputation as a businessman and early capitalist, investing in lucrative exports and helping to expand his family manor in Golești. Especially in his final decade, Golescu reinvested much of his wealth into the social uplift of peasant communities, building several rural schools and sponsoring the printing of books.

Golescu's rise began in the early 1780s, when he took over as Spatharios, also overseeing work on the Old Princely Cort of Târgoviște; he remained associated with Dâmbovița County, especially as its Ispravnic (sheriff), in which capacity he served until being deposed by the Ottomans in the Russo-Turkish War of 1787. From 1794, he received a role as foreign-policy overseer, or Great Logothete, and, in 1799–1800, served his first term as Great Ban of Oltenia. During these terms, he was also head of a token Wallachian military force assisting the Ottomans against the rebellious warlord, Osman Pazvantoğlu. Chased out of the country in 1802, when parts of Wallachia were sacked by Pazvantoğlu, he spent some years in relative isolation, including after his return; his sons also took up politics, climbing into the middle and higher reaches of administrative boyardom. During the war of 1806–1812, Golescu pledged himself to the Russian Empire, though he was marginalized within the administrative apparatus of Russian-occupied Wallachia. As an adversary of the returning Prince Constantine Ypsilantis, he opted to go into his second exile, to Moldavia.

Golescu returned to Wallachia under the subsequent reign of John Caradja, who tasked the former Ban with sanitation work, which was supposed to contain the eponymous plague. Rewarded with a second and third terms at the Banship, he was later briefly the Wallachian treasurer (Vistier), in which capacity he supported some of Caradja's most controversial practices. He and Iordache were ultimately sidelined in 1817, following Caradja's definitive clash with the nationalists. Ban Golescu died shortly after, with his funeral being the last public function attended by Caradja, who then fled Wallachia. The junior Golescus endorsed a return to their father's economic policies, trying to obtain support for them during the Regulamentul Organic regime in the 1820s and '30s. Radu's many grandsons embraced liberal radicalism, with most of them playing parts in the Wallachian Revolution of 1848.

== Biography ==
=== Origins and early life ===
Despite his usage of the Golescu surname, Radu was only descended from that family through his mother Anița—she was daughter of Radu Leurdeanu Golescu, who had tried to seize the Wallachian throne for himself during the 1710s, before pledging himself to the Habsburg Monarchy; Anița's brother Constantin had died childless, making Radu Jr an inheritor of the boyar estate. Radu was also the maternal great-great-grandson of Stroe Leurdeanu, one of the major political intriguers of the mid-to-late 17th century. The latter had also built a long-standing manor in Golești, which was the clan's eponymous estate, on Muscel County's southern border. The name of "Golescu" had been used sporadically by various members of the clan, the first one of whom was a 16th-century Clucer, also named Radu Golescu, who had served Prince Radu Paisie; it was revived and settled by the early-18th-century Radu, known in some records just as "Radu Leurdeanu". Radu Sr died in 1731 at his home in the Banat of Craiova—namely, Oltenia, which was then administered as a Habsburg province.

The future Great Ban was born on 3 May 1746, from Anița's marriage to Nicolae Șirbei, a Polcovnic in the Wallachian military. Nicolae's father, Ilie, had joined Leurdeanu Golescu in his political endeavors and his eventual exile to Oltenia; at the time of Radu Jr birth, the latter region had been retaken by Wallachia, now under a Phanariote regime. From the Știrbeis, the boy inherited land in Dâmbovița, including the village of Produlești-Ghinești. Golescu-Știrbei was an educated man by 18th-century standards: probably home-schooled, he preserved his manuscript textbooks, in the Greek original. These show that he was taught geography, geometry, arithmetic, Greek mythology, and Ancient Greek literature (with samples of Hesiod, Theocritus, Anacreon, Bion, and Pindar). His early political climb was tied to administrative functions in Dâmbovița: he probably first entered the administrative service around August 1782, when, as a titular Paharnic and sheriff (Ispravnic) over the entire Dâmbovița, he was called upon to settle a dispute between Nucet and Stelea Monasteries.

From his marriage to Zoița or Zinca, daughter of Costache Florescu, Golescu-Știrbei had four sons and a daughter. One version of their succession is provided by literary historian Mircea Anghelescu: the eldest son, Nicolae, was born in 1772 or 1773, while Gheorghe "Iordache" followed in 1774 or 1775, with their more famous brother, Constandin "Dinicu", being the only one whose full date of birth is recorded (7 February 1777). Historian Vasile Novac indicates sources which identify Iordache's birth year as 1768 or 1770, making him the oldest; he also notes that Radu's one daughter, Ana, became the wife of a Great Ban, Mihalache Racoviță. Another son, Ianache, is almost entirely unknown except for passing records, which suggest that he served as a Stolnic and died before 1815 (though one document may prove that he was alive in 1821).

Radu's political advancement was manifest in 1784, when he became Spatharios of Wallachia's military. In 1785 his liege, Michael Drakos Soutzos, ordered him to carry out restoration work on the Old Princely Cort of Târgoviște—including new frescoes by Popa Ioan Zugravu. An inscription in the princely church, dated August 1785, credits him as a Great Paharnic (a title he no longer held in January 1786, as shown by his deed to the estate of Fundeni, purchased from Neculae Cocoș). His activities also included surveying the city's property boundaries, settling disputes between boyar Grigore Greceanu and the local burghers. He first held the rank of Great Clucer at some point before August 1786, while still serving as the Ispravnic to late 1787. Notes left by Târgoviște burgher Dumitrache al Popii Gheorghe suggest that Golescu was detained by the Ottoman Army, which put an end to his tenure ("I never saw him again"). Historian Gabriela Nițulescu believes that this refers to the Russo-Turkish War of 1787, when Târgoviște was under an Ottoman military administration, and that the events most likely took place in January or February 1788; she notes that, in March, the new Ispravnici were Greceanu and Ioniță Caramanlău.

=== Political rise ===
Historian Constantin Dinu argues that Golescu was one of the "boyars most interested in developing capitalism, one in the a category of those who set up manufactures and advanced commercial life." Much of his life was spent on accumulating a personal wealth; in his last will, dated to February 1815, he notes: n-am prăpădit [averi], ci încă om adăugat, încât pociu zice că le-am îndoit ("never have I squandered [properties], but have only added to them, so much so that one could say I've doubled them"). As noted by historian Nicolae Iorga, his financial standing was precarious around 1800: he "was mixed up in lots of affairs, and owed quite a lot of debts." Though he lost Fundeni, which was sold back and forth between other families, he compensated with other purchases in Dâmbovița—Dâmbovicioara (July 1787) and Ghimpați (before 1815). At some point before 1816, he and his cousin Sandu Golescu set up two watermills (Morile Sandului) at the mouth of Râul Doamnei, just east of Pitești. Radu was a major producer of honey, beeswax, hay, and maize, which he sold abroad through a Transylvanian merchant, Constantin Hagi Pop; an employer of skilled immigrant workers, he opened up a number of shops, and an inn, on Bucharest's Podul Calicilor. As Golescu himself put it, the inn had been "bought and refurbished" by him, probably around 1800; it emerged as "one of the city's most important and spacious".

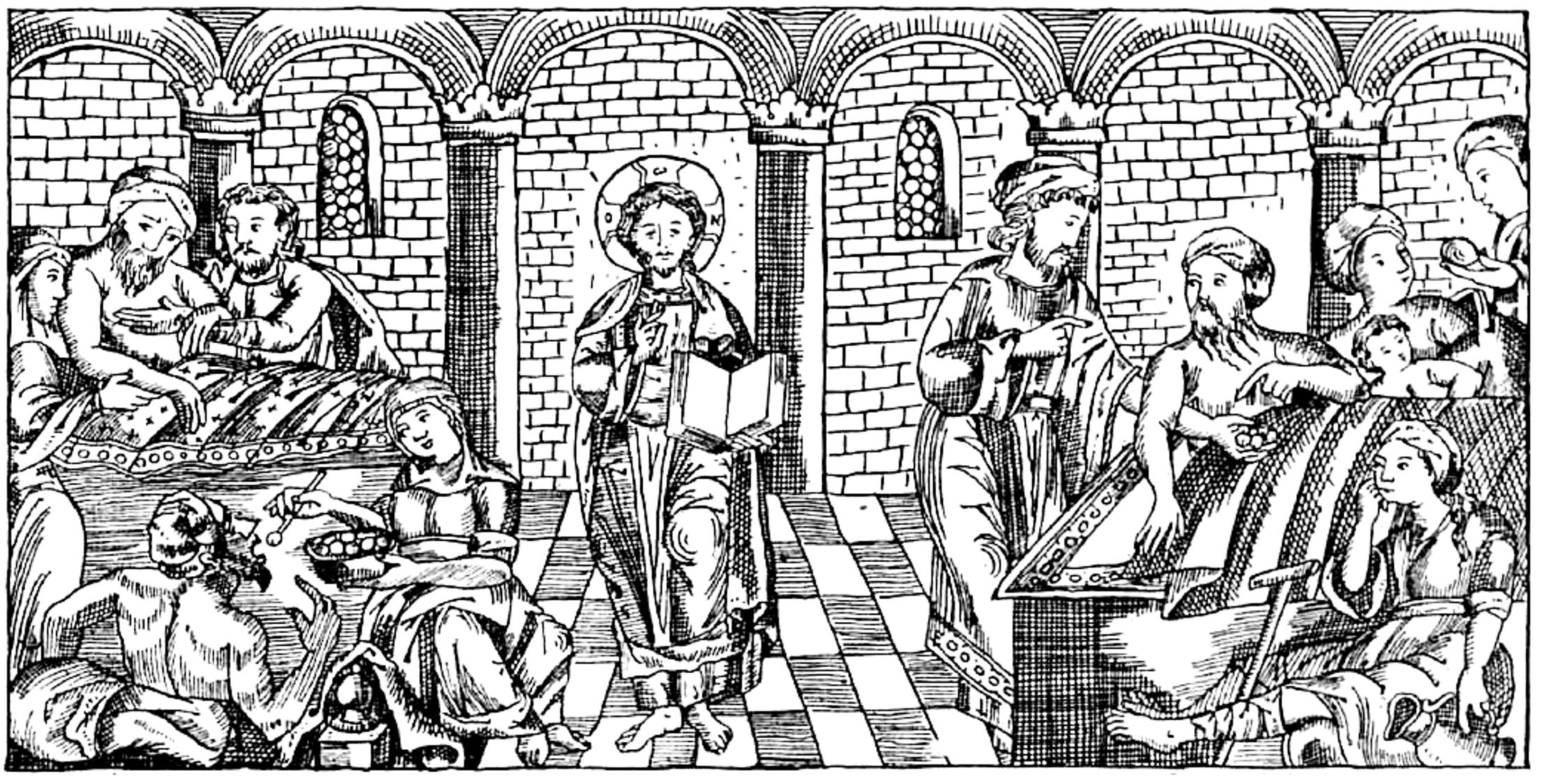
John Chrysostom appearing inside a clinic, showing treatment of the sick in 18th-century Wallachia. From a 1706 manuscript, Cronica Frățietății

In 1788, Golescu-Știrbei was again Clucer. The following year, he participated in the reopening of Târgoviște church, with a ceremony also attended by Prince Nicholas Mavrogenes. A Habsburg invasion in November 1789 chased out Mavrogenes, and left the country occupied until 1791. The Habsburgs governed using a revamped version of the Boyar Divan, presided upon by Josias of Saxe-Coburg-Saalfeld; Golescu was assigned to it as a Vornic. In December 1793, Golescu asked Prince Alexander Mourouzis for approval to donate Vieroși Monastery, located on his lands and established by his Leurdeanu ancestors, but curated by the Wallachian Orthodox church province, to a Greek Orthodox monastery on Mount Athos. His request was denied as contrary to Wallachian customs, with Metropolitan Dositei Filitti also weighing in the fact that Golescu was not agnatically descended from Stroe Leurdeanu. By September 1794, Golescu, now a Great Logothete, was engaged in tax farming, and bought from Mourouzis the right to collect winemakers' taxes throughout Argeș County. He complained to the Prince that he had been cheated on by the debtors; although the vineyards were entirely located in Muntenia, his claim was addressed by an inquiry headed by the Oltenian Banship. Shortly after, the bubonic plague erupted in Wallachia, with Mourouzis heading the relief and containment effort—in April 1795, Golescu was personally instructed to disinfect parts of Bucharest. According to a court document of July 1795, Bucharest had a Golescu quarter (or mahala), in which Grigorie Bujoreanu and boyar Barbucică acted as the plague wardens.

By January 1796, Golescu had been made Great Vornic of "the Lower Land", in which capacity he collected and distributed funds resulting from the auctioning of other boyar ranks and titles. In July 1796, during the final stages of Mourouzis' reign, Golescu, alongside members of the Divan such as Ienăchiță Văcărescu and Nicolae Filipescu, called for a relaxation of fiscal pressures. They persuaded Mourouzis to denounce the Ispravnici for confiscating crops directly from the tenant farmers, at harvest-time. On 7 August, still a Great Vornic, Golescu stood on a jury that reviewed the land dispute between I. Cioranu and the Catholic monastery of Târgoviște. Some days before, he had been named caretaker (Epitrop) of the Wallachian hospitals and quarantine facilities, which had been established at Dudești. He had various dealings with the eponymous Dudescu boyars, and, around 1801, collected rent for Safta Dudescu's inn. Around that time, he acted as a tutor for his orphaned nephew Constantin Dudescu. The latter alleged that Golescu wanted to have him take religious orders in order to confiscate his estate, and, with help from Habsburg authorities, crossed into Transylvania. Dudescu was financially ruined by this initiative, and returned willingly in 1805, when Golescu again took him into his direct care.

=== Under Hangerli and Prozorovsky ===
The short-reigned Alexander Ypsilantis (1796–1797) recognized Golescu's merits. By May 1797, he was Great Vornic of the armies (vel vornic al obștirilor [sic]), in which capacity he carried out an inspection of Bucharest's drugstores. While serving under the new Prince Constantine Hangerli (1797–1799), Golescu advanced the cause of economic nationalism—according to Novac, he was inspired to do so by echoes of the French Revolution. Specifically, he supported bringing in traders as advisers in the Army Supply Department (Departamentul Epitropiei Obștirilor), also urging Hangerli to curb imports and prop up local factories. His activity at the Department resulted in the co-option as councilors of the Aromanian merchants: Spirea Cazoti, Mihai Chiriță, and Ioan "Ianache" Scufa. At the same time, Golescu endorsed Hangerli's very controversial tax on cowherds, called văcărit. He was still seen as a champion for the common man, and asked by the citizens of Ploiești to act as judge at a trial opposing them to the Prince. His expertise in geometry was acknowledged in 1798, when he was asked to draw up a plan of Ulmeni estate, a disputed Ypsilantis fief. In 1800, he commissioned in Vienna a world map, which included a smaller map of Wallachia.

At an unspecified moment in 1798, Hangerli was confronted by the threat of a marauding mercenary leader, Osman Pazvantoğlu, who had established a basis south of Wallachia, in the Rumelia Eyalet. A consular report by the Habsburg diplomat Joseph Hammer suggests that Golescu was called upon by Hangerli, who appointed him Serasker, to assist a token Wallachian expeditionary force, which supported the Ottoman Empire against the rebels. In 1799, with Mourouzis returning on the throne, Golescu proceeded to address matters of internal trade by establishing a glassmaking factory at Șotânga in Dâmbovița, initially staffed by Transylvanian Saxons who "live[d] in his houses". The "German" staff also included Transylvanian Romanians from Porumbacu, for whom he provided additional housing. His involvement in land speculation continued in August 1800, when he bought off Scufa's property outside Curtea Veche and sold it as allotments to various merchants.

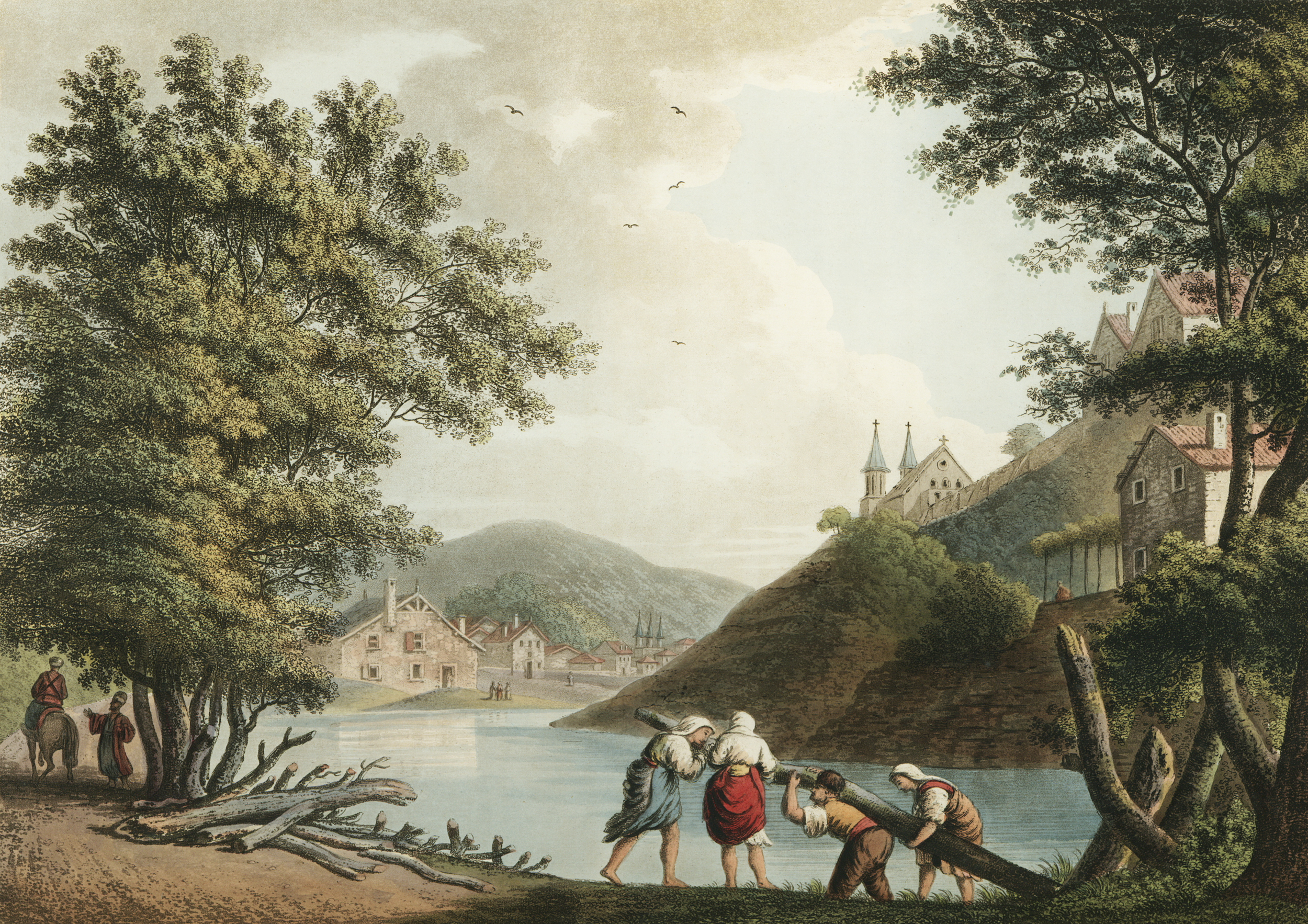
Pitești in the late 18th century, by Luigi Mayer

Golescu first rose to the Great Banship in 1799, and endured as such in 1800, by which time his son, Nicolae (sometimes known as Deli-aga), was the Ispravnic of Pitești. Along with other boyars, Radu had to flee from Wallachia in 1802, and lived for a while at Kronstadt, in Habsburg Transylvania, where he is known to have been followed by Dinicu. His departure was prompted by Pazvantoğlu, who had stormed into Oltenia. Upon his return (from what was by then the Austrian Empire) in 1804, he focused on expanding his manor in Golești, but also became a benefactor of various schools—including one in Slatina, and another in one in Nămăești. Also that year, he was widowed—Zoița died at the family estate in Bălcești-Gorj. Possibly around this time, he became personally invested in the education of his younger boys. Iordache and Dinicu received their education at the Princely Academy, where they became fluent in Greek and possibly French as well; at least from 1804, Dinicu pursued a career in the administrative boyardom, being himself named as the Ispravnic of Pitești in March 1811. Still a Vornic under Prince Constantine Ypsilantis, in 1805 Golescu Sr ruled exemptions from the tithe for the Bucharest bakers.

The eastern war of 1806 brought Wallachia and Moldavia under occupation by the Russian Empire, abruptly ending Ypsilantis' first reign. Golescu remained in place, as the third-oldest member of the administrative Divan, and cooperated with the new regime: he and Barbu Văcărescu, together with Ivan Meshchersky, formed an investigative triumvirate which looked into abuse by Ypsilantis' Muntenian Ispravnici. In May 1808, both he and Văcărescu signed up to a French-language public protest, which asked the new authorities not to cut back on expenditures by eliminating eleven boyar ranks. His own good faith was questioned in Russian sources, with one anonymous report, preserved by the Governing Senate archives, calling him "very astute when it comes to business, but immeasurably thirsty for wealth, and mean-spirited."

Golescu was deposed on 6 September 1808, after an inspection ordered by Alexander Prozorovsky. In January 1809, alongside other boyars, he signed a letter of recommendation for the Dragoman and merchant Manuc Bei, describing him as an "honest patriot" who had lent money to the Wallachian state. In August 1811, alongside Isaac Ralet and Mihalache Manu, he petitioned General Steter, who commanded upon the Russian troops in Wallachia, to clamp down on the Bulgarians and Serbs of Lichirești in southern Muntenia; these communities had refused to pay government taxes, viewing themselves as under Russia's protection. He was sidelined until February 1812, when he was promoted to the core of the Divan; this was after, and because, some of the boyars had spoken out against Russian policies, and had then been sent into internal exile, vacating their seats.

Ypsilantis himself had fled to safety in Transylvania, while some of the boyars freely moved between Austrian and newly Russian-conquered territory; many, including Golescu, denounced Ypsilantis and declared themselves loyal to Russian Emperor Alexander I, moving to Moldavia when Ypsilantis staged his return. In a letter preserved by the Austrian consulate, they defied the Prince, who had invited them back, demanding that Wallachia be placed under a boyar republic with a Russian governor. This project never came to fruition; under the treaty of Bucharest, Russia allowed the Ottomans and Phanariotes to return as leaders in both Wallachia and Moldavia. Radu's own public career peaked again under Prince John Caradja, who took the throne in late 1812. On 17 October, just as the last Russian troops were leaving Bucharest, Georgios Argyropoulous took over as Caradja's regent (or Caimacam), assigning leading positions in the Divan to Golescu, Grigore D. Ghica, and Constantin Bălăceanu.

=== Under Caradja ===
Iordache also participated in the national government, as both Stolnic and caretaker of the schools, emerging as a protector of Gheorghe Lazăr, the progressive educationist. In early 1813, Caradja left an official document praising Iordache for his dedication and faith. As noted by literary historian Mircea Iorgulescu, Dinicu and Iordache were in fact part of the opposition, a "Golescu party" whereby "the Wallachian boyars, having been turned from soldiers into courtiers," used their influence to undermine Caradja. In July 1813, Radu Golescu was assigned to a boyars' team which tried to contain "Caragea's plague"; according to Iorgulescu, this was Caradja's attempt at "buying off" the Golescus. Specifically, he and Postelnic Constantin Suțu reviewed reports of any local outbreaks, also conceiving of a project (never undertaken) to sanitize the Dâmbovița River on its lower course. In 1815, this experience allowed him to contribute directly towards funding Filantropia Hospital, alongside Constantin Caracaș and Grigore Brâncoveanu. In June 1813, he endorsed a six-year monopoly for the pharmacist Lorenz Dampner, who had opened up shop on Podul Mogoșoaiei. In August, he and his colleagues ordered a metochion-and-inn on that same street to be used as a provisional hospital. The plague continued to kill Wallachians, including, in September 1813, members of the Great Ban's own household.

In June 1813, Caradja made Radu Golescu his Great Ban, as a replacement for Argyropoulous, but without moving him to Craiova (where he was represented by his own Caimacam, Constantin Samurcaș). Golescu only served to August, when he was replaced by Constantin Crețulescu—Samurcaș continued in his role to 1815. That same year, Golescu was again attested as Great Vornic, but "of the Upper Land". Before his replacement with Isaac Ralet, he gave a minor regional appointment in Oltenia to the young soldier Tudor Vladimirescu, who would later play a major part in the anti-Phanariote struggles. From at least July 1814, Golescu the elder replaced Constantin Filipescu as treasurer (Vistier), serving as such to April 1815, when Filipescu retook the office. In August 1814, he produced a letter of protest in which he claimed that, due to the confiscations and privations of war, Wallachians "no longer have anything". He himself still openly engaged in tax farming, paying Caradja 1 million thaler for the privilege of collecting the tithe, as well as taxes on mutton and wine, and making what was reportedly a hefty profit on this deal. Meanwhile, he protected his own retinue from visits by other tax collectors, and, by the time of his death, had registered 188 people as "known to be exempt" (poslușnici știuți). Treasury records noted that the Saxons of Șotânga owned no property of their own, and therefore owed no tax. Golescu instead made a point of collecting personal debts, and had one of his Saxon women-workers, Lisabeta, held in the debtors' prison. A habitual litigator, he was also a claimant to the estate held by Elena, a member of the Ghica family. During his final years, he defended this inheritance with a series of lawsuits, claiming that a banker had stolen Elena's emerald ring, from her deposit, and had presented him with a fake.

As reported in letters by Manuc Bei, who was by then Caradja's exiled enemy, this was a time of great corruption and spoliation, to which Golescu acquiesced, having himself paid 600 thaler in bribes for promotion to the office of Vistier. In December 1815, he spent 40,000 thaler on purchasing a Bucharest townhouse previously owned by Clucer Mihalache Lahovari. In parallel, Dinicu also built himself a townhouse, on land located near Stejarul Church. Competed in 1815, it was the Wallachian example of cast-iron architecture, and had uniquely large rooms; according to an anecdote relayed by Ulysse de Marsillac, Ban Radu was struck by the ambitious project, pointing out to Dinicu that there was no way to ensure its indoor lighting (to which Golescu Jr replied: "Father, I am building for the future"). The Ban was himself in beautification works, when, in July 1814, he proposed to Caradja that all inhabitants of every seventh home on Podul Mogoșoaiei be forced to maintain a streetlight candle.

During these years, Golescu-Șirbei alternated exploitation with philanthropy. Throughout his final decades, he sponsored the printing of books, including, in 1800, Iordache's papers and, in 1812, Constantin Vardalah's manual of physics. He also financed an edition from Rafail Monahul's book of ethics, Ușa pocăinții. He was additionally a co-ktitor at Țigănești Monastery in 1812 (alongside Iordache Florescu and Anica Soutzos-Florescu), as well as a benefactor of Arnota Monastery—commissioning in 1817 its silver reliquary, which contains the hand of Margaret the Virgin. In November 1815, he bought a forest outside Șotânga, which he knew to be frequented by Rudari drifters. He then organized it into a village for both the Rudari and Saxons, calling it Goleasca. It is also possible, but not certain, that the boys' school established by Ban Radu for the peasants of Golești dates back to 1814.

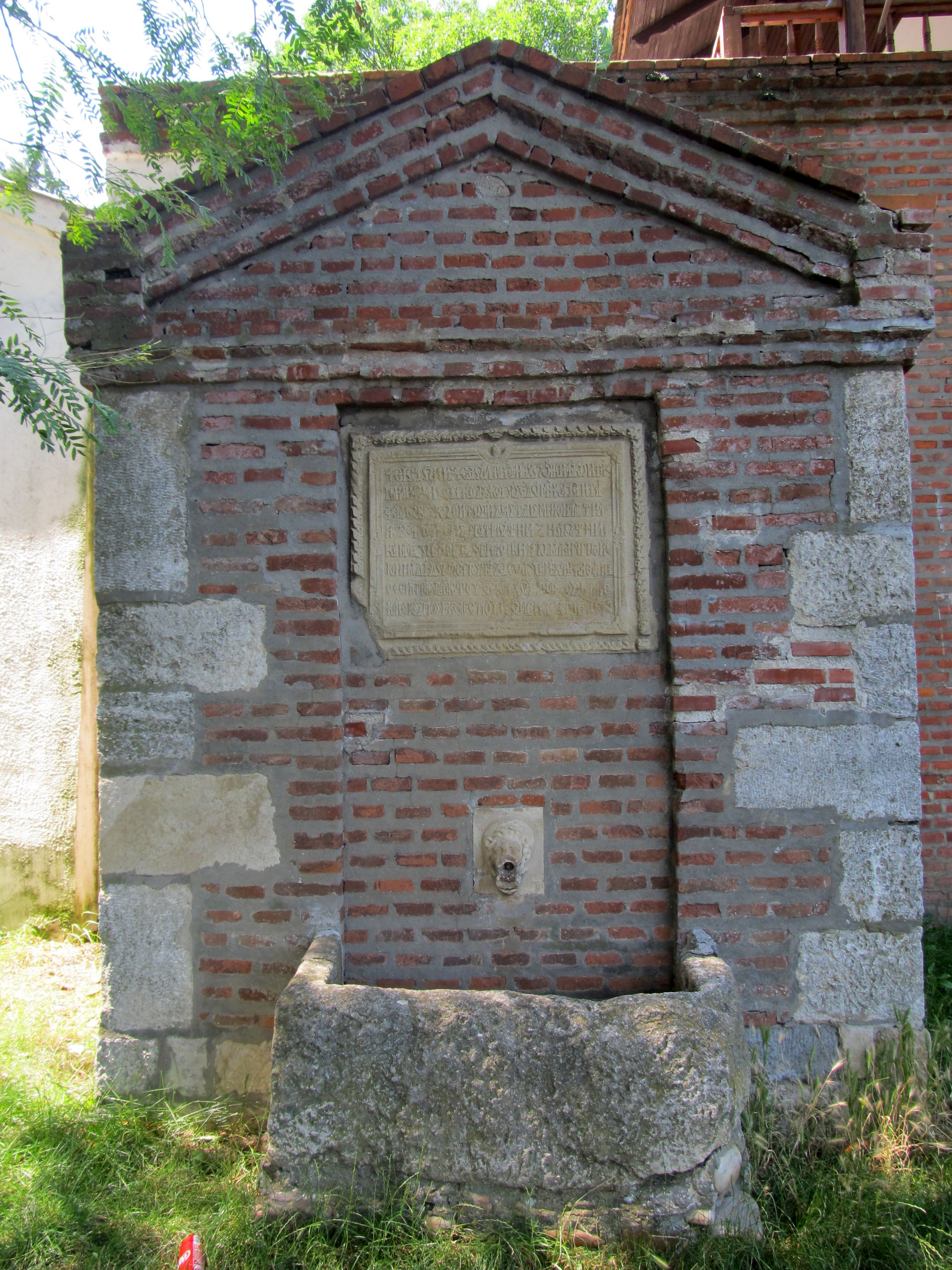
Great Ban Radu's fountain, and dedicated epigram in Greek, at the family manor in Golești

In late 1816 and early 1817, Caradja directed his persecution among the boyar champions of Romanian nationalism, being especially harsh on Filipescu, who was exiled. Noting this succession of events, Manuc also informs that Radu and Iordache Golescu were coarsely pressured into conformity by the Prince. Reappointed Great Ban for a while in 1818 (with Grigore Romaniti as the Caimacam), Golescu died on 8 October of that year; the date is remembered for being shortly before Caradja's hurried, and permanent, departure from Wallachia. His body was taken for burial in Golești, though a service was held at Bucharest on 11 October (Old Style: 29 September), being the last public function attended by the fugitive Prince. Golescu's last will provided for the upkeep of Wallachia's poor, to whom he transferred revenue from a bridge toll over the Argeș River, as well as that of his three watermills in Leordeni. Fixed sums were also allocated for three funds, one benefiting impoverished boyars, another destitute girls of marrying age, and finally one for ransoming debt-prisoners. He also demanded that a two-bed clinic be organized on his Golești estate, with services provided by the physician of Pitești.

== Legacy ==
As summarized by scholar Constanța Vintilă-Ghițulescu, Iordache remained "an active participant on the political scene, between the reigns of Princes Caradja and Bibescu. Proud of his lineage, the Vornic [Golescu] only reserved venom, harsh words of scorn, for any parvenus that made their way into the nobility." He was left some of his father's core estates, including Leordeni, as well as the main Bucharest inn, while Deli-aga took over the glassmaking business. Dinicu, who was appointed Great Logothete by Caradja's replacement Alexander Soutzos, was bequeathed the Golești manor. He reestablished his father's school there, but was only able to keep it functional to c. 1821, when a large-scale peasant revolt broke out in Wallachia, with Vladimirescu as its leader. The latter used the Golescu manor as his last base of operations; this is where he was captured by a rival warlord, Giorgakis Olympios. The three Golescu brothers were committed to the late Ban's economic agenda into the late 1820s, as Wallachia experienced another Russian occupation, followed by the Russian-inspired Regulamentul Organic regime. In his dealings with the new governor, Pavel Kiselyov, Iordache presented a set of proposals for political and social reform. Kiselyov read the project, upon which he struck out the demand for industrial development. In 1810–1820, Golescu's inn on Podul Calicilor was still one of only seven such institutions in Bucharest. Iordache's own failures as an entrepreneur resulted in it being split into two enterprises, auctioned off in 1833 and 1835, respectively. Known as Garni Inn, it was later bought by Johann Kloss.

Ban Golescu is the subject of two epigrams, which were carved into stone near his fountain in Golești, and which were first translated into Romanian by George Fotino in 1943. According to Anghelescu, they may in fact be the Ban's own works. Other than contributions by his own sons, he has preserved a legacy in Romanian literature through his mentions in Zilot Românul's rhyming chronicle—it depicts him as a servile figure at Hangerli's court. Memoirist Ion Ghica includes mention of Golescu's unpopularity during his time with Caradja, when regular folk, subjected to harsh taxation policies, circulated a diddle mocking several boyars, including the line Golescu golește ("Golescu empties" or "Golescu strips one bare"); as noted in later scholarship, Iordache Golescu also renders this joke in his pamphlets, but without including the two words which addressed his own clan. The Ban's legal quarrels over the emerald ring are also mentioned, and used as a plot device, in Nicolae Filimon's Ciocoii vechi și noi ("Upstarts Old and New"), which is one of the first Romanian novels.

By then, the Ban's sons had noted children of their own. Iordache's six surviving children (from a total 23, born to him from his second wife Maria Bălăceanu) include Alexandru Golescu-Arăpilă ("Golescu the Arab", or "Golescu the Black"), a major figure in the Wallachian Revolution of 1848. Arăpilă's elder brother, Dimitrie, was apolitical, and published one work of philosophy; he spent his life in Spa, where he had a son, Georges de Golesco, from his marriage to Joséphine Body. A lawyer and novelist, the latter died without heirs, as did his writer sister, Hélène de Golesco. In Wallachia and later in the United Principalities, Arăpilă's political efforts were supported by Dinicu's four sons: Ștefan, Radu Constantin, and Alexandru Golescu-Albu. Their sister, Ana (1805–1878), was married to Craiova's Ispravnic Alexandru Racoviță, with whom she lived in Oltenia during the 1830s. Through them, Ban Radu was the maternal great-grandfather of Scottish Romanian artist Nicolae Grant, who painted a copy of his ancestor's portrait in 1946. Dinicu's progeny may include an illegitimate daughter, Ana Ipătescu—who was also directly involved in the 1848 events.

Dinicu's legitimate children and their mother, Zoe Farfara-Golescu, inherited the manor after Dinicu's death, and displayed Radu's original portrait in its dining hall. Even before the revolution, they intended to grant freedom to all their serfs, but were stopped from doing so by Prince Bibescu. Abandoned and falling into disrepair, the complex was restored in the early 1940s by the Romanian Kingdom, through the National Co-operative Institute. To the north of that landmark, Morile Sandului endured as a name in local topography, despite the watermills being rebuilt in 1834, damaged (most likely by the floods of 1837), and finally discarded around 1870. Although the glass factory was sold by Nicolae in 1827, and much of the surrounding estates similarly lost, Goleasca endures as an informal name for the area outside Șotânga. The Garni Inn was finally condemned and demolished in 1894. Its replacement, the Nierscher Arcade, was itself demolished in 1984.
