= Zinca Golescu National College =

School in Pitești, Romania

Coordinates: 44.85362°N 24.87452°E

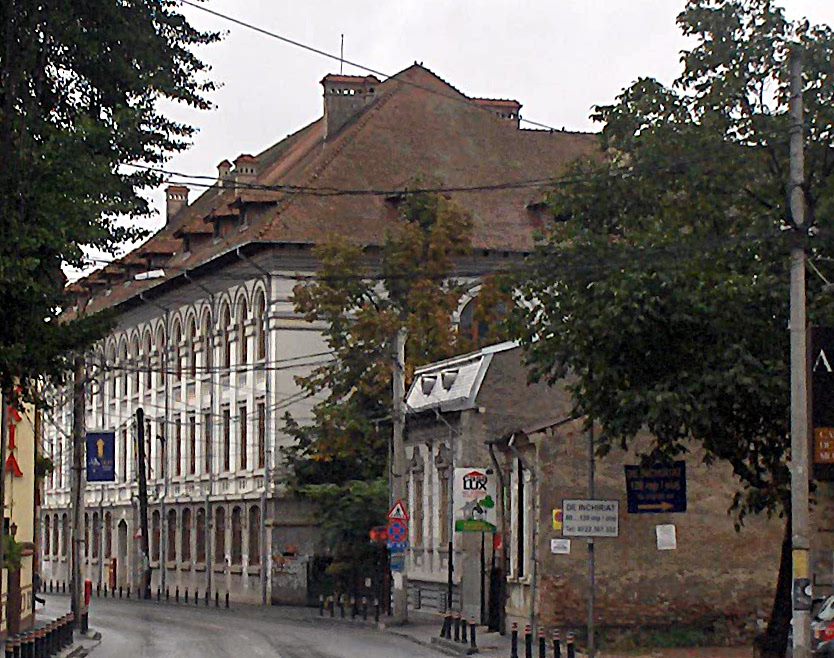
Zinca Golescu National College

The Zinca Golescu National College (Romanian: Colegiul Național "Zinca Golescu") is a public day high school located at 34 Egalității Street, Pitești, Romania.

Founded as a girls' school in 1921, it initially had three grades, but expanded to eight grades from the 1924–1925 year. The school building dates to 1925–1928, and is classified as a historic monument by Romania's Ministry of Culture and Religious Affairs. Inaugurated in time for the 1928–1929 school year, it was financed by a donation from Mihail and Sevastița Vasilescu, and the school was named in their honor at that point. In 1971, on the occasion of the semicentennial, it was named after the 19th-century patriot Zinca Golescu. In 2001, it was granted the title of national college.
