= Zoe Golescu =

Romanian revolutionary

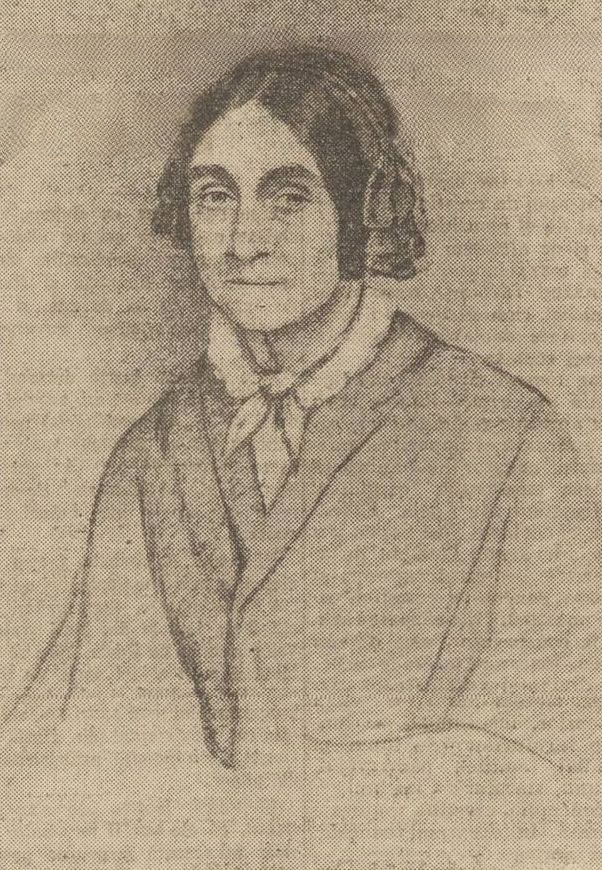
Zoe (Zinca) Golescu

Zoe Golescu (1792–1879) was a Romanian revolutionary who participated in the Wallachian Revolution of 1848.

== Life ==
Zoe Farfara was born and married at the age of 13 to Dinicu Golescu, the great boyar of the time, and became Zoe Golescu also known as Zinca or Zoița. They had together 5 children, 4 boys, Ștefan, Nicolae, Radu, Alexandru and a girl, Ana. Dinicu taught her French, a language she would use in the letters she would send to her exiled sons in Western Europe.

She wrote texts in French and ancient Greek and attended the salons in Bucharest, where she learned about the revolutionary writings published in the West. Zoe Golescu was one of the educated women in Bucharest. Her letters to her four boys, all in French, are richly colored stylistically and strongly permeated by a strong and vigorous sentimentality. She accompanied her sons into exile after their participation in the Revolution of 1848. She returned to the country at the end of 1849 where she was forced by the authorities to self-exile to the Golești estate.

She fought for the social and intellectual emancipation of the Romanians.

She died at the age of 87, after losing four of her five children.

The Zinca Golescu National College in Pitești was named in her honor in 1971.

== Bibliography ==
- George Marcu (coord.), Dicţionarul personalităţilor feminine din România, Editura Meronia, București, 2009
