= Dinicu Golescu =

Wallachian Romanian journalist and travel writer (1777–1830)

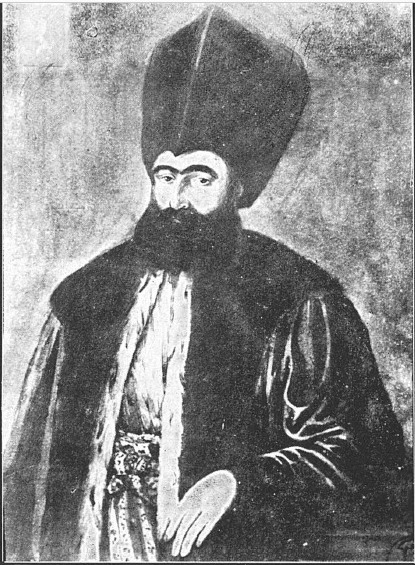
Portrait of Dinicu Golescu

Dinicu Golescu (usual rendition of Constantin Radovici Golescu; 7 February 1777 – 5 October 1830), a member of the Golescu family of boyars, was a Wallachian Romanian man of letters, mostly noted for his travel writings and journalism.

Born in Ștefănești, Argeș County, Dinicu was the son of Radu Golescu. Together with his older brother George (or Iordache), he studied at the Phanariote-founded Greek Academy in Bucharest.

In 1804, he married Zoe Farfara (?–1879), with whom he had five children: Ana (1805–1878), Ştefan (1809–1874), Nicolae (1810–1877), Radu (1814–1882), and Alexandru Golescu Albu (1818–1873). All of his sons were to play prominent parts in the Wallachian Revolution of 1848 and in the politics of Romania, as would his nephew, Alexandru Golescu Negru.

In 1826, he published an account of his travels through Europe, Însemnarea călătoriei mele ("Account of My Travel"), which is the first travelogue of a Romanian in Western Europe. He uses his travelogue to study the administration and production systems in various countries, which he describes and recommends through comparisons with the situation at home. The text contains a plea for a general reform of domestic institutions in a "European" direction (based on Enlightenment ideas). Viewing European culture as more advanced, he managed, despite his middle age and the considerable difficulties he had in expressing himself, to convey a message of change. His travel journal had a great influence on the Romanian intelligentsia of the time.

One of the founding members of the Bucharest Literary Society (1827), Golescu contributed to the issuing of the first Romanian-language newspaper to be published outside the country, Fama Lipschii pentru Daţia (1827, Leipzig; its title translated as "The Fame of Leipzig for Dacia"). He also helped Ion Heliade Rădulescu launch Curierul Românesc, on 8 April 1829.

Dinicu Golescu died in Bucharest. His epitaph, written by Rădulescu, was published on 9 October 1830 in Curierul; it reads:

"Tu ai dispărut, scrierile tale îţi vor supravieţui, şi numele tău va rămîne scump ştiinţei precum şi celor ce se adapă de la izvoarele tale." ("You have vanished, [but] your writings will have outlived you, and your name shall remain treasured by science and by those who drink from the same sources as you.")

Bucharest's Gara de Nord was built on land owned by Dinicu Golescu. A nearby park and boulevard currently bear his name.
