= Vâlsan (disambiguation) =

Vâlsan may refer to:

- Vâlsan, a tributary of the river Argeș in Romania
- Costești-Vâlsan, a village in Mușătești Commune, Argeș County, Romania
- George Vâlsan, Romanian geographer
