= Robaia =

Robaia may refer to several places in Romania:

- Robaia, a village in Mușătești Commune, Argeș County
- Robaia, a village in Berislăvești Commune, Vâlcea County
- Robaia (river), a tributary of the Vâlsan in Argeș County
