= Constantin Dobrescu-Argeș =

Romanian peasant activist and politician (1856–1903)

Constantin I. Dobrescu-Argeș
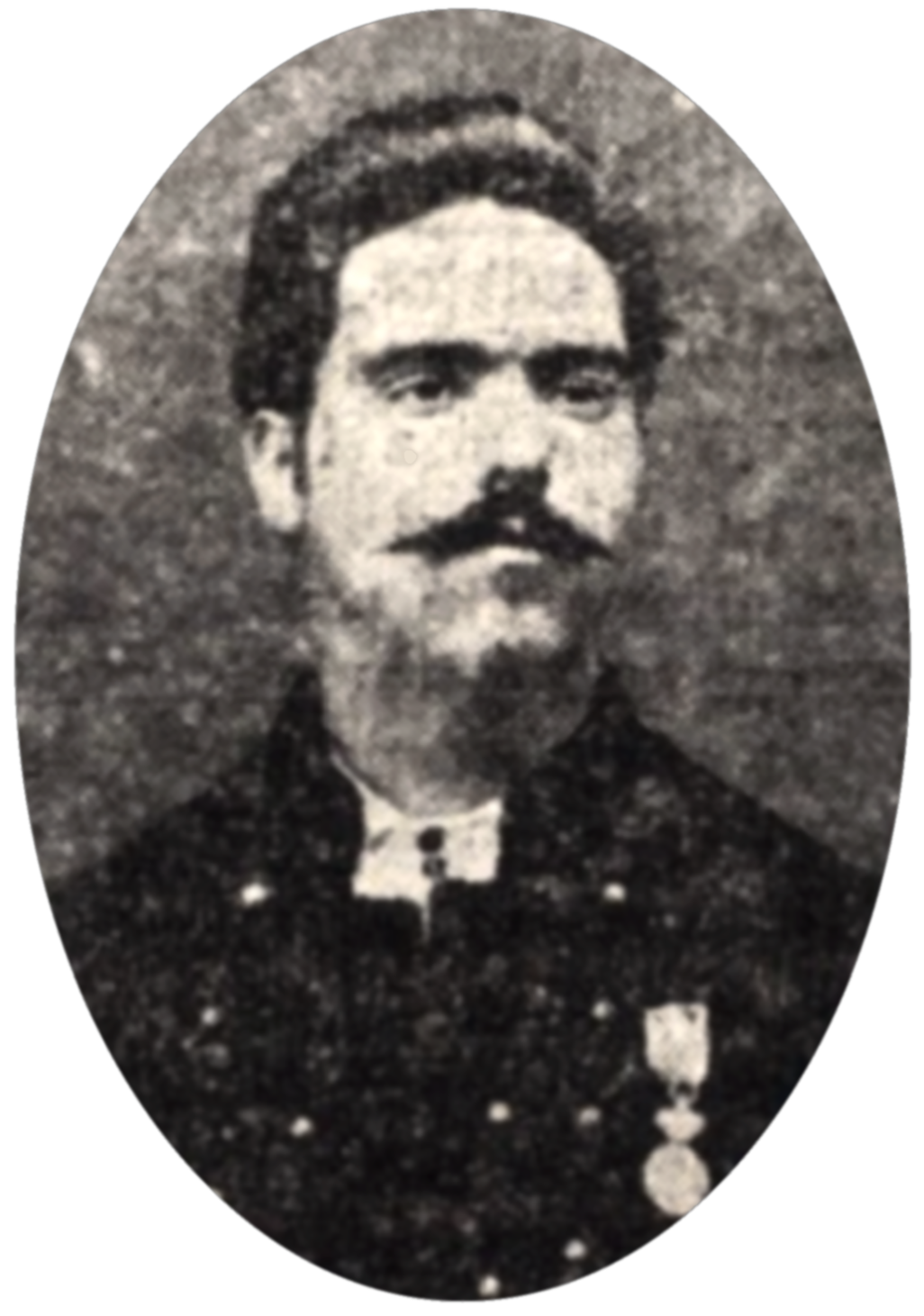
- Dobrescu-Argeș in 1886

Member of the Romanian Assembly of Deputies
- In office 1889–1898
- Constituency: Argeș County

Personal details
- Born: June 28, 1856 Mușătești, Wallachia
- Died: December 10, 1903 (aged 47) Mușătești, Kingdom of Romania
- Party: Peasants' Committee (1881–1888); Conservative Party (1888); Radical Party (1889); League of Universal Suffrage (1894); Partida Țărănească (1894–1899)
- Spouse: Avida Poinăreanu (1890–1893; her death)
- Relations: Alexandru Valescu (brother-in-law)
- Profession: Schoolteacher, jurist, social scientist, activist, cooperative organizer, editor, playwright, ghostwriter

Constantin I. Dobrescu, better known as Dobrescu-Argeș (June 28, 1856 – December 10, 1903), was a Romanian peasant activist and politician, also noted as a teacher, journalist, and jurist. Active from his native Mușătești, in Argeș County, he established a regional, and finally national, base for agrarian politics. He is considered Romania's second agrarianist, after Ion Ionescu de la Brad, and, with Dincă Schileru, a revivalist of the peasant cause in the Romanian Kingdom era. Dobrescu was notoriously unpersuaded by agrarian socialism, preferring a mixture of communalism and Romanian nationalism, with some echoes of conservative populism. Thus, he stopped short of advocating land reform, focusing his battles on democratization through universal suffrage, and on obtaining state support for the cooperative movement. He himself founded some of the Kingdom's first cooperatives, also setting up model schools, the first rural theater, and the first village printing press—which put out his various periodicals.

Although well liked by cultural and political figures of all hues, with whom he collaborated on various projects, Dobrescu's clandestine support for the concept of "Greater Romania" made him a political liability. He also perplexed the ruling classes with his advocacy of universal suffrage and corporatism, both of which would have been politically advantageous for his peasant constituents. The Argeș squire Ion Brătianu, who was serving as Prime Minister and National Liberal chairman, allegedly viewed Dobrescu as a personal enemy, and had him kidnapped for several hours in 1884. Technicalities were invoked to block Dobrescu out of the Assembly of Deputies, despite his repeatedly winning in elections. Eventually, he served four contiguous terms in the 1880s and '90s, moving from alliances with the Conservative and Radical Parties to the position of an isolated independent, and, in 1895, to leader of his own Partida Țărănească ("Peasants' Party"). Dobrescu remained largely opposed to the left-wing caucus formed around the Romanian Social Democratic Workers' Party, but, especially after studying at the Free University of Brussels, became interested in anarchism, which claimed him as an ally.

Dobrescu's nationalism and his association with ill-reputed figures such as Alexandru Bogdan-Pitești contributed to his marginalization—as did his reputation as a "carnival peasant", one who had backstage dealings with the establishment. Such ridicule and one public beating closely preceded scandals involving his financial misdeeds, alleged or proven. His dossier was personally handled by Justice Minister George D. Pallade, a personal enemy, leading to questions about the integrity of the process. Upon the end of a publicized trial lasting to 1901, Dobrescu was found guilty of fraud, and emerged from prison after three months with his health compromised, dying in his peasant home. His brother-in-law and associate, Alexandru Valescu, carried on with Dobrescu's work and made efforts to reestablish Partida, being ultimately drawn into conspiracies leading up to the peasants' revolt of March 1907. Dobrescu himself remained cited as a martyr and precursor of agrarian and Poporanist movements, revived during the interwar, as well as being credited as a forerunner of the National Peasants' Party. Under the Romanian communist regime (1948–1989), Mușătești endured as a center for peasant culture, although official literature proscribed Dobrescu as a bourgeois or "diversionary" figure.

== Biography ==
=== Beginnings ===
Born in Mușătești, his father Ion "Niță" Dobrescu was a Romanian Orthodox priest. Constantin was the eldest of eight children born to him and Maria Popescu, "a woman famed for her beauty and familial decency". All other seven children were daughters. One of them, Paraschiva, later married Alexandru Valescu, who was Constantin's political disciple and long-time collaborator; another daughter married P. T. Rădulescu, also noted a schoolteacher and activist. Constantin's ancestors included Pitar Nicolae Popescu, who had fought in the Wallachian uprising of 1821, becoming secretary to its leader, Tudor Vladimirescu; Vladimirescu would serve as an inspiration to Dobrescu in his own efforts of social improvement. Nicolae Popescu's brother, known as "Popa Dincă", had established the school in Mușătești, which was used as a rallying spot for the local peasants during the June 1848 Revolution. Constantin's maternal grandfather, Toma Popescu, also credited as an influence on the young Dobrescu, had participated in the upheaval and had gone into hiding upon its defeat. Dobrescu, who became fluent in French, was widely read in matters of political economy, having studied Montesquieu, Jules Michelet, François Guizot, Adolphe Thiers, and Le Play. He was additionally much inspired by the political articles of Mihai Eminescu, which he read out to, and put into more accessible language for, his peasant constituents.

After attending Popa Dincă's school, where he used dirt and his own fingers as writing utensils, Dobrescu continued his education at Curtea de Argeș and Pitești. He studied at the Orthodox theological seminary in the former town, one of several peasant inductees. A distinguished learner, he also dedicated some of his time there to the study of Romanian folklore, taking notes on the songs and dances performed by less intellectual colleagues. Made confident by his parents' material and spiritual support, Constantin opted not to join the clergy—though he was persuaded to remain with them in Mușătești, it was as a schoolteacher. He took this job in 1875, and immediately petitioned governments about the hurdles faced by poorly paid teachers in a "backward environment". He sanitized and enlarged the school, while also adopting new teaching methods that were inspired by readings from Herbert Spencer, Jean-Jacques Rousseau, and Pestalozzi. As a result of his efforts, the Education Ministry opened up two more teaching positions in his village. Each year in August, Dobrescu gave lectures to other teachers and acquired notoriety as an educationist. In 1876, he sheltered and tutored seminary pupils who had been expelled for reporting on bribery at that institution. His success in this endeavor became apparent when all of his trainees passed their state examination and found steady employment.

During this period, Dobrescu also became interested in the cause of peasant representation, militating against the weighted suffrage established under the Constitution of 1866, and implicitly against the two-party system that it favored. As he put it, the peasant could have "an active part, of the uttermost importance". He challenged the political establishment by noting that peasant representation had steadily declined, from 36 deputies in the ad-hoc Divans to 33 in the "United Principalities" era, and then to none in the Assembly of Deputies. As noted by the agrarianist writer Ilariu Dobridor, Dobrescu was the second person in Romanian history, after Ion Ionescu de la Brad, to have championed peasantism as a political, not merely "philanthropic", effort. Also according to Dobridor, Dobrescu's first attempts to set up an agrarian movement brought him into contact with left-wing figures such as Alexandru Bogdan-Pitești and Constantin Mille—both disappointed him.

Social historian Mircea Vrânceanu sees the legislative election of 1878 as Dobrescu's political debut. Able to converse in both the rustic dialect and the emerging literary language, he was called by one the candidates to "translate the purpose of elections" for the peasant caucus in Pitești. Dobrescu instead "sketched out, for the first time in our history, a program of peasant demands", and was asked by those present to be their candidate; he had to decline, as he was not yet qualified under the law. This speech "made him famous. [...] He was a superior orator. He held sway over the masses." At that stage, Argeș was becoming an electoral fief of the National Liberal Party, whose leader Ion Brătianu owned estates in Ștefănești. Possibly acting on Brătianu's orders, Nicolae Dimancea, known as the county's "Pasha", tried to coax Dobrescu into joining their party; his offer was rejected. According to records kept by educationist Stanciu Stoian, Dobrescu's first office was as a county councilor for Argeș, elected despite having only just reached the voting age. He put himself up as a candidate in the repeat election of 1879, winning an Assembly seat for the Fourth College in Argeș. However, the electoral law specified that he had to be aged 25 to qualify, and so his mandate was invalidated. The elections did produce one peasant deputy, Dincă Schileru (Schileriu), who affiliated with the Radical Party of C. A. Rosetti and George Panu. He served almost continuously to 1911.

Dobrescu's other work was focused on cultural activism, for the goal of creating and popularizing "rural dramas, rural comedies, rural poetry, [...] our own philosophy, our own arts, purpose, traditions and our own sort of civilization". He intervened in reviving local cottage industries with unusual marketing tactics, including having one of his girl pupils sew and wear an apron with the slogan Arta casnică e comoara femeii ("Handicrafts are a woman's treasure"). In order to facilitate the peasantry's access to education and the amenities of modern life, Dobrescu also advocated for the establishment of free libraries (the first of which were set up in 1878–1879 in Mușătești and Poenărei), rural banks and general stores. In 1879, the Central Rural Athenaeum, devoted to teaching adult peasants to read and write, was founded under his guidance. This institution comprised a choral and folk dance ensemble, a public library, an ethnographic and pedagogic museum, an agronomical station, a gymnastics arena, a school for adults, several cultural circles, a popular bank and a magazine that disseminated news of these venues' achievements. In 1882, Dobrescu also created the first rural theater in the entire Romanian Kingdom, which stages plays that he had written himself. This was followed in 1884 by the country's first cooperative, set up at Domnești under the name of Frăția ("Brotherhood")—although Mușătești remained the hub for the cooperative movement for the next two decades.

=== Committees ===
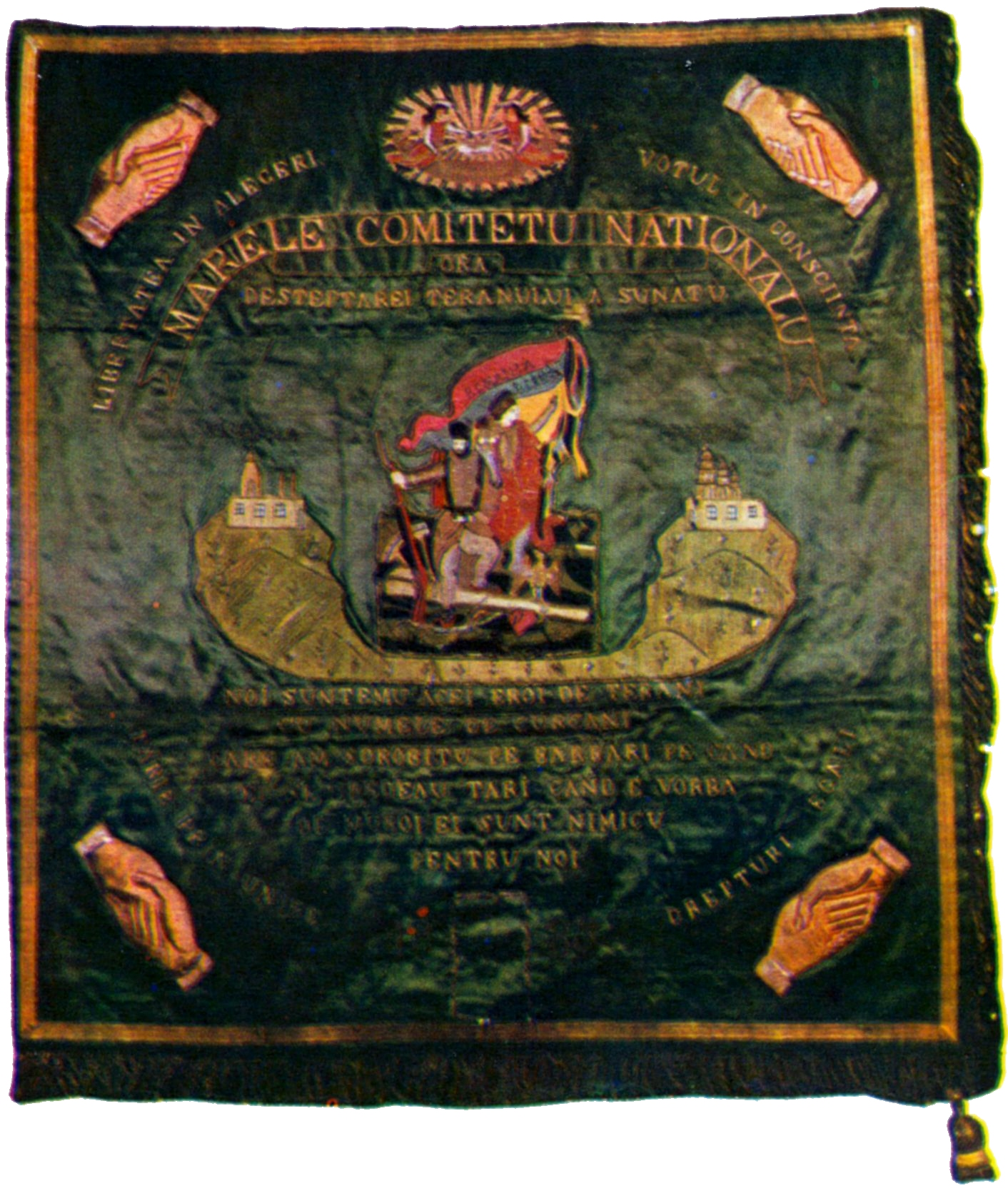
Banner of the Mușătești Peasants' Committee, sewn in 1883

In order to better organize for his struggle, in 1881 Dobrescu founded at Mușătești a Peasants' Committee, a political network that brought together activists from Argeș and Gorj, later expanded into other regions of Muntenia and Oltenia. Its co-leaders were Schileru and Mucenic Dinescu, and its first congress was held at Corbeni in August 1882. The previous month, Dobrescu and Schilleru had dined together in Bâlteni, where Dobrescu first outlined the idea of a "peasant party", which would have been focused on preserving the peasantry's constitutional rights; his program in this respect greatly enraged the political establishment, including the National Liberals, who favored expanding the urban middle classes, and the Conservative Party, focused on preserving landowner privileges. During the early 1880s, Dobrescu was also considering corporatism, with each social group electing representatives exclusively from its own ranks—knowing that peasants had secured a permanent numerical advantage.

Historian Ioan Scurtu notes that the Corbeni gathering had over 400 people in attendance, but also that these were "well-off peasants", or chiaburi. According to Dobridor, the rally was a historic moment, bringing together peasants who had hitherto been separated by sectarian causes. Dobrescu "simply lifted up his sword to sever the ropes of coterie that had penetrated the very soul of the peasants, had carved the mark of slavery into their napes, like a yoke carving into the neck of a buffalo." Aware that the authorities would eventually intervene to ban such gatherings, Dobrescu and other delegates attempted to quickly rouse the peasants of Muscel County, riding into Nămăești and announcing a second congress to be held in that village. By some accounts, the meeting was broken up by police, who asked that all Argeș envoys be sent back to their homes. Journalist Luca Paul suggests instead that the Nămăești rally was held "in broad daylight", indifferent to any threats made by the authorities.

An ardent nationalist and "irredentist", Dobrescu also supported the clandestine activities of Romanians in Transylvania and other parts of Austria-Hungary. With these, he earned more attention from Brătianu, who was serving as Prime Minister of Romania; against the irredentist agenda, he wished to preserve good relations with the Austrian establishment and expected civil peace in his constituency. Dobrescu was secretly investigated by a Captain Vinieru, who reported from Sălătrucu that Dobrescu was coordinating illegal activities over the frontier, and had himself traveled to the area around Rothenturm for unknown purposes. The Vinieru episode came shortly after the democratization reforms initiated by Brătianu, which had increased representation for the middle classes, rural ones included, and merged the lower two electoral colleges into a Third. Such enfranchisement came with its own limitations: some 98% of the electorate could only vote for Assembly with indirect suffrage, the rest being excluded from this by wealth and literacy requirements; some 41% of the deputies elected under these new laws represented rural constituencies, but most of them were not land-working peasants. By Dobrescu's own calculations, there was still a 1:20,000 ratio of representation in the new college, whereas the upper two had 1:180 and 1:421, respectively.

Despite being constantly harassed with the authorities, the Committees sent four deputies to the Assembly in the general election of 1883—one of them for Argeș. Dobrescu himself returned as a peasant candidate repeat elections of 1884, winning a seat for Argeș's Third College against the National Liberal favorite, Toma Trifonescu. He was again invalidated, since, as a teacher, he had a conflict of interest. He ran again in by-elections of 1885, though by then the Committees had disbanded. As reported by Vrânceanu, government put up ten candidates to draw away votes from his platform, while police intervened to prevent him from even registering. He only managed to enter the race by traveling to Pitești in disguise as a shepherd. Although he had suspended his work in state education, Dobrescu was again faced with invalidation. This time, he was reproached for not having served in the Romanian Army, but the real reason may have been his irredentist subversion.

Days after the election, Brătianu had Dobrescu kidnapped and brought to his manor in Ștefănești, where he tried to either intimidate or persuade him into joining the National Liberals. According to Vrânceanu, this "meeting of two worlds" ended with Brătianu ordering his rival's release on condition that he return to teaching; Dobrescu was soon stripped of all but one of his teaching posts, for Brătianu to make sure that he would not the time and income for politics. Deaconu writes that Brătianu ordered the "insolent peasant" conscripted as an infantryman, but that this measure was toned down by Dimancea, who released Dobrescu and sent him back to Mușătești. He was eventually drafted and sent to Northern Dobruja, where he fell gravely ill; upon his return, he discovered that his two fellow teachers in Mușătești had been sacked, and that his time was fully occupied with his handling the school.

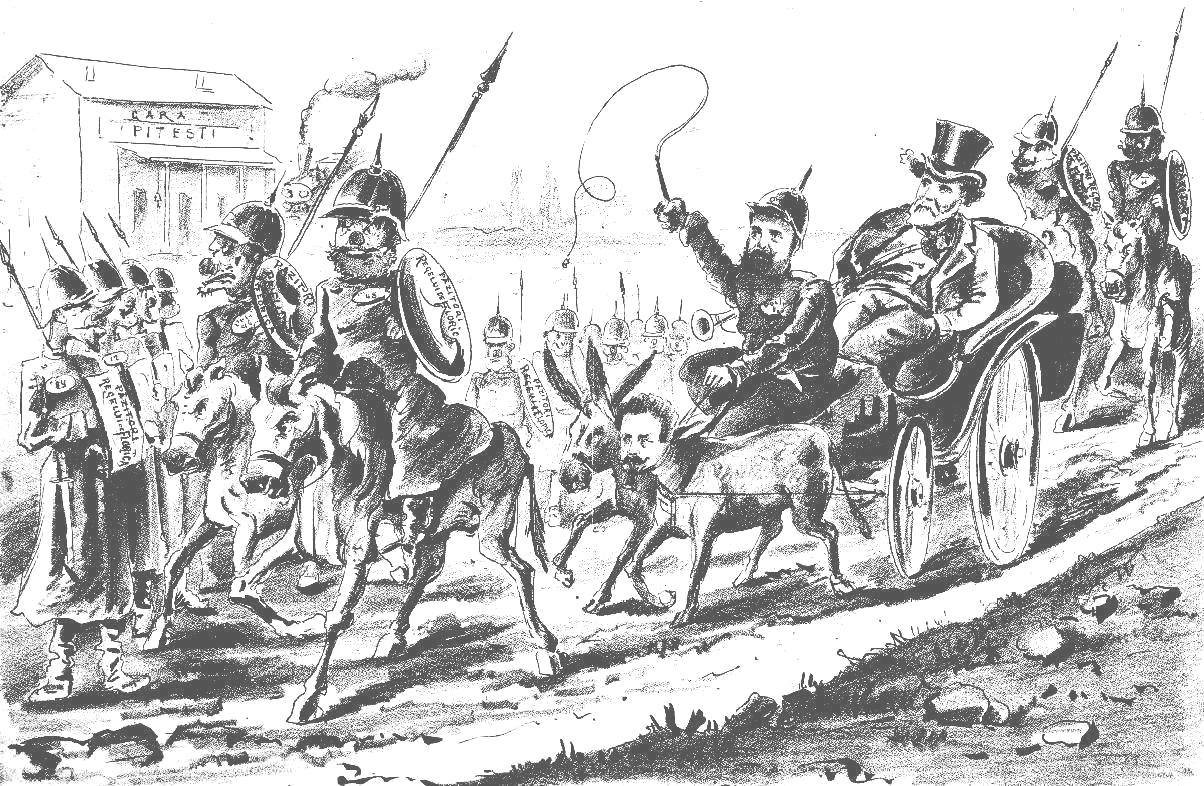
The political domination of Argeș County by Ion Brătianu, as lampooned in Bobârnacul (March 1886)

Some official reports suggest that his subversive activity was never fully interrupted. In 1886, he traveled into Transylvania, creating additional outrage in National Liberal circles: government officials claimed that he was there to purchase fur hats "à la Michael the Brave", to use as a quasi-uniform for his "peasant army" to invade Bucharest with. Vinieru claims that Dobrescu was involved in the June 1887 episode which ended with a shootout between an "irredentist" group and the Army, at Albeștii de Muscel. Also according to Vinieru, the affair was kept secret by the National Liberals, and altogether ignored by the opposition Conservatives. Dobrescu had parted ways with the other Peasants' Committee veterans. Under Schileru and Dinescu's watch, a revived Committee had turned into an agrarian branch of the National Liberal Party. As noted by Argeș historian Gheorghe I. Deaconu, Brătianu was using the committee as a wedge against the peasant caucus—and more specifically against Dobrescu's own electorate. Deaconu also argues that, in 1887, Brătianu sent George D. Pallade to befriend and spy on Dobrescu, obtaining information which the establishment then used to bring down the peasant leader.

=== Parliamentary debut ===
In the October 1888 election, Dobrescu took a Third College seat at Argeș, with 491 votes from 571. He ran on a Conservative ticket—backing the government of Theodor Rosetti, and defeating the National Liberal Theodor T. Brătianu. This mandate coincided with the peasant revolts of 1888, which Dobrescu anticipated in his Assembly speeches. Upon the rebellion's quashing, he expressed a moderate position, refusing to condemn Rosetti for his violent response to violence, and agreeing with him on the underlying causes of rural unrest. In February 1889, Dobrescu favored the project of settling peasant issues by selling off state properties, noting that thousands had already asked to be granted such plots. He described this as a quick solution to the social crisis: "the peasant was always grateful to those who were good to him. [...] If [peasants] revolted last year, and if they are currently in turmoil, it is only because of scoundrels who agitate them". Registering as an independent, he was closely aligned with Schileru's Radicals in February 1889, and is tentatively described by scholar Philip Gabriel Eidelberg as a "liberal populist". In April 1889, he was listed as one of 17 Radical and dissident Liberal deputies, all of whom voted against the project to fortify Bucharest.

Overall, Dobrescu argued for class collaboration "on social issues", an attitude for which he was cited approvingly by the Conservative doyen Petre P. Carp. By 1889, he was declaring his frustration with the over-representation of ethnic minorities: "Professions, commerce, industry, they're all under occupation. And these foreigners don't treat us as if we were from their own house, they see us as the newcomers. Nowhere is there a sign of our supposed assimilationist strength." At that stage, he believed many in peasant self-help as a vehicle for progress, and mainly asked government that it form a "Ministry for the Peasantry", with no thoughts of forming a distinct political group. Alongside Mihai Săulescu, he drafted a bill for land reform, but later backed down from supporting it, arguing that "peasants require justice more than they require land reform". As noted by the Radical paper Lupta, it was impossible to tell whether this meant that Dobrescu was for or against land redistribution. He later elaborated that what was needed were "syndicates" of state-sponsored producers, and noted that the one existing credit union only helped peasants to marginally "eke out a living". By contrast, Rosetti relied on selling state land to modest producers, in lots of 5 hectares, marginalizing both the landless and wealthier peasants.

This period also brought his involvement in the controversy about socialist agitation in the countryside. Dobrescu had been curious about socialism, and frequented the Marxist Ioan Nădejde. However, he soon grew to dislike both the movement and Nădejde, exposing the latter as an "ass in a lion's pelt". He also claimed that Nădejde had failed the test of proletarian internationalism, since, allegedly, he opposed the naturalization of Romanian Jews—possibly referring to the specific case of Ralian Samitca. In turn, Mille, by then co-opted by the socialist journal Drepturile Omului, ridiculed Dobrescu as a "carnival peasant". In February 1889, with fellow deputies Grigore Cozadini, Mihail Caracostea, and Ernest Sturdza, Dobrescu visited Roman County to investigate the election of Lascăr Veniamin as socialist deputy. The commission's findings eventually led the other socialist deputy, Vasile Morțun, to resign and demand that he be formally tried. Some of the peasants he met asked him to run for their constituency, following Veniamin's looming invalidation. Reportedly, this showed the abrupt decline of the socialist movement. In May 1890, Dobrescu, Panu and Nădejde still co-sponsored a bill together, namely one which would have removed references to the King of Romania in the oath taken by judges (and which historian Vasile Niculae described as "Parliament's first socialist and democratic act to have an anti-monarchic nature").

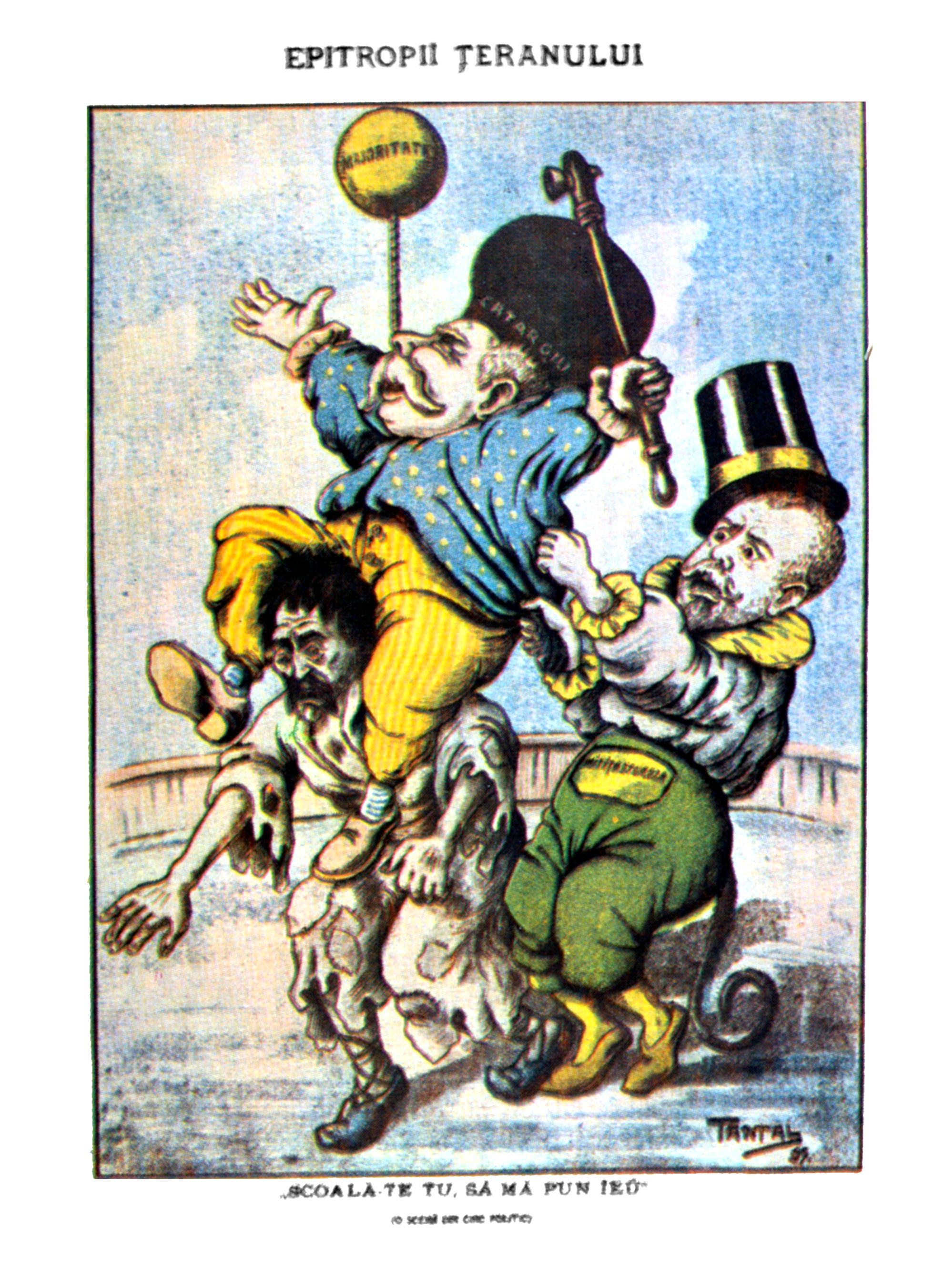
"The peasant's caretakers" Brătianu and Lascăr Catargiu, as depicted by the socialist cartoonist Tantal in 1889

Dobrescu also edited several periodicals: Țĕranul (1881–1884), Romania's first rural cultural and political publication; and Gazeta Poporului and Gazeta Țăranilor (1892–1903), through which he attempted to spread his ideas into the villages, aiming to integrate all rural teachers into cultural societies. The former in particular was very time-consuming: "[it] was being put out in the Pitești press owned by C. Popescu. Here is where Dobrescu's torments would begin. On each Saturday, after finishing his work with the students, he would ride to Pitești on his buckskin and, after ensuring that the paper would come out, traveled back on Sunday evening, to where his other work took him."

Deaconu notes that this 100-kilometer weekly ride was seized upon as an opportunity for persecution by the National Liberal authorities, who sent inspectors to Dobrescu's school once every three days. From 1892, Dobrescu and Valescu set up the Society for Peasant Culture, which was designed as a funding mechanism for a more accessible printing press. In founding this venue, Dobrescu explained that "printing a peasant newspaper in someone else's printing shop is like hatching cuckoo eggs in a wren's nest." Alarmed by these developments, the authorities encouraged Dobrescu's adversaries in the teaching profession to sue him for embezzlement; the court ruled in Dobrescu's favor. Before September 1890, Dobrescu had come under investigation for supposedly illegal activities also involving the artillery guards, and was shamed for this by both the left-wing daily Adevărul and the Conservative organ Timpul. They suggested that he should resign his seat, and argued that his self-promotion was distasteful.

Scurtu reads the Society's charter as a "moderate" political program; Valescu reports that in 1893 Take Ionescu, the Conservative Education Minister, informed the team that he would not tolerate any revolutionary message in Gazeta Țăranilor. The nameplate, Paul notes, carried a "common-sense" motto: Respect la proprietate, pagubă nimănui; Respect la persoane, foloase generale ("Respect for property, at no harm to anyone; Respect for people, with benefits for all"). As noted by historian Nicolae Iorga, Gazeta had a "talented" editor, but a "mostly local" influence; the statement is qualified by Constantin Bacalbașa, who argues that this venue also "planted the very first seeds of a rural awakening". Completed in 1894–1898 with the sheet Școala Poporului, the periodicals were put out by his own printing press in Mușătești, which he had purchased with money granted by Ghenadie Petrescu, the Bishop of Argeș. It was "the first printing press and bookbinder ever to have functioned in a rural commune."

=== Brussels and party formation ===
Dobrescu pursued his mission in various other ventures: pioneering institutions founded by Dobrescu during this interval include, in 1893, the cooperative in Mușătești, named after Vlad Țepeș, and, in 1895, Școala Nouă ("The New School") of Domnești, furnished with a library and reading room. His influence spread westward as his directives were embraced by schoolteacher Grigore Rădulescu of Bezdead, Dâmbovița County. Rădulescu rode to Mușătești and discussed with his mentor a plan for setting up a model cooperative bank. This was founded in April 1893 as the People's Bank of Malul de Răsună. He was again elected to the Assembly, at Argeș, following the race of 1891, and reelected in 1892. During these legislatures, Dobrescu listed himself as an unaffiliated "Democrat", and became known as Dobrescu-Argeș to be distinguished from another Constantin Dobrescu, the National Liberal deputy of Prahova. The two Dobrescus confronted each other over the issue of education reform: both agreed that Minister Ionescu's Conservative project was needlessly elitist; however, Dobrescu-Argeș contended that the National Liberal counter-proposal was even more "backward". His proposal was to create a network of compulsory primary schools with equal budgets, irrespective of whether they served rural or urban communities; it failed to register support on either side of the political divide.

Dobrescu-Argeș's political stances were becoming ambiguous, and left-wingers came to suspect that he was secretly an ally of Lascăr Catargiu and his Conservative cabinet. Dobrescu openly supported some Conservative causes: with his theater, he performed one of his plays in front of King Carol I, who awarded him a decoration and his own portrait as a souvenir; in November 1892, he voted for adding 300,000 lei to the civil list, going to the royal family. A serious scandal erupted in November 1893, during debates over the establishment of an agricultural bank. Dobrescu promised nationalists A. C. Cuza and Constantin Popovici that he would endorse their amendment, excluding non-Romanians from the enterprise. He took the paper for signing, but never returned it, and found himself chased around the Assembly, threatened by Major N. Pruncu, and pummeled by Popovici. The incident was witnessed by writer (and deputy) Alexandru Vlahuță, who declared himself disgusted and demoralized by the casualness of the affair. Such displays prompted his 1889 rival Morțun to reuse the derisive moniker of "carnival peasant", an insult later popularized by Adevărul, alongside "poisonous mushroom" and "inveterate thief".

The incongruity was also noted by the Radical Panu, who argued that the "extremely congenial" Dobrescu showed up in Romanian dress but was "not a peasant, however much he may enjoy that designation [...] he merely dresses like one". He honored in Dobrescu the "intelligent man of the Argeș", noting how fast he picked up on new things, but also that he lacked discipline. His abilities were also noted by the staff journalist at Foaia Populară, who described Dobrescu as the "miraculous" figure of a self-made man, and by Bacalbașa, who remembered him as "highly intelligent, cultured, and overflowing with political ambitions".

In winter 1890, Dobrescu married Avida Poinăreanu, daughter of a Muscel peasant leader. From 1893, following her sudden death, he dedicated himself to field research among the peasants of France and the Low Countries, and, hoping to silence his detractors, also pursued academic recognition. His life abroad was difficult: in August 1894, he wrote home to complain that he had no means of supporting himself in Brussels, despite "work[ing] continuously 15 hours out of 24". He eventually obtained a doctorate in law from the Free University of Brussels after studying there from 1894 to 1897. Dobrescu's activity as a student sparked another controversy in 1897, upon notice that he had been awarded a scholarship by the Agriculture Ministry, then under the National Liberal Anastase Stolojan. He was colleagues with the anarchist Panait Mușoiu, and, as noted later by writer Tudor Arghezi, he himself became a "quasi-anarchist" (read by Vrânceanu as a clue that Dobrescu was also a revolutionary socialist). Mușoiu himself remarked in 1901 that "Dobrescu never expressed very radical conceptions. He confined himself to what one may call a minimum. But this fact never prevented [...] the movement he stoked from being open to expansion, from continuing as something larger. The establishment was not wrong in listing Dobrescu among a class of people it feared, which is to say on the same side as us."

By March 1895, Dobrescu stood in the generic opposition, and, alongside Cuza, attacked Catargiu's cabinet, and the Conservative Party in general, for not doing enough to improve rural education. The claim enlisted a lengthy retort from the Conservative Barbu Ștefănescu Delavrancea, who furnished evidence for the role of upper classes in rural advancement. Alongside Ion Rădoi, Dobrescu was by then invested in creating a nation-wide peasants' group, called Partida Țărănească ("Peasants' Party"). Reviewing Dobrescu's articles on this topic, Scurtu highlights the projected recruitment of "teachers, priests, communal councilors, mayors and notaries. Therefore, this was to be a party of the rural bourgeoisie." His agitation in favor of rural emancipation led to his arrest at Costești, but he was soon released due to his parliamentary immunity.

Map of Dobrescu-Argeș's agrarian movement in Argeș and Muscel

The group was ultimately established on October 4, 1895, with an inaugural congress held in Bucharest; this caucus also established a permanent Action Committee, co-chaired by Dobrescu and Rădoi. The platform, voted by peasant representatives from 20 counties, restated and detailed some of Dobrescu's main goals, including state investment into cooperatives and breeding programs, communalism with room for personal property and common land for gazing, and the auditing of peasant debt. It also had nativist requests, suggesting that peasants access a land reserve created from land repurchased by the state from non-nationals, and that leases on land be granted only by locals; an additional goal was the establishment of Greater Romania "spread as far as the Romanian language is spoken". The group still enjoyed disproportionate support from Bulgarians, who had grievances against the Romanian state and appreciated Partida's anti-establishment ethos.

The first party of its kind in Romania, Partida operated until 1899. By 1894, Dobrescu had sided with the emerging caucus of politicians favoring a switch to the universal suffrage—as he put it, the "8,000,000 citizens who make up the bulk of this nation" needed to be spoken for by a "league of resistance", which is what Partida could represent. However, Panu and the Adevărul team, who mounted this campaign, were openly alarmed by his alleged corruption and, in 1895, obtained his withdrawal from the nascent League of Universal Suffrage. According to Niculae, Dobrescu was merely used by the Radicals as a "pretext allowing them to ditch any concrete action in favor of universal suffrage, and to keep the masses uninformed about [their own] blatantly pro-conservative orientation". Dobrescu and his followers were more interested in tax reform and a balanced budget, with Dobrescu speaking up against state employees "whose number", Dobrescu argued, "has offset the number of electors". The group also called for predictability in taxation, and for adopting "those methods that statesmen in more civilized countries" have used to "increase peasant revenues". These goals went in tandem with unionization: Dobrescu spoke about legalizing agricultural syndicates to "protect labor".

=== Scandal ===
Dobrescu was returned to the Assembly a final time in 1895, after defeating the National Liberal Daniil Sterescu 645 votes to 280. In the latter race, he shared a ticket with his brother-in-law Valescu. Partida also won a seat for Muscel, taken by M. Moisescu, with Dincă Schileru as a dissident National Liberal. The campaign in Vâlcea County was mounted by Ștefan Drăghicescu, with Partida registered locally as the Peasants and Workers' Party. It failed to win Drăghicescu a seat. Dobrescu also backed a Mușătești native, the policeman Ion Niculescu-Fotografu, who was running for a deputy's seat in Suceava County. At the time, the two were close friends, with Dobrescu acting as a ghostwriter for Niculescu, and advertising for his artisans' guild. One report has it that the two of them worked on a series of handicraft-themed albums. Niculescu had paid for these to be printed, but could not make a profit, and blamed Dobrescu for the debacle.

By then, Dobrescu's party had shifted some of its weight toward Muscel, with Gazeta being printed from Câmpulung before finally relocating to Bucharest. According to Dobrescu, during the 1895 electoral campaign Catargiu had ordered a clampdown on the printing press in Mușătești, with authorities threatening his readers throughout the region. The editorial offices, however, remained in place. Valescu was tasked with editing Gazeta Țăranilor. He was singled out for retribution by the Conservative government, who suspended him from his job as a schoolteacher and wished to have him barred from that profession altogether. Dobrescu resolved this issue by assigning the editorial position to Rădoi, a former judge; he finally donated Gazeta to Valescu in 1896. In August 1895, Rădoi highlighted his and Partida's legalist credentials during an audience with King Carol. The monarch asked him to specify the difference between Dobrescu's followers and the socialists, to which Rădoi allegedly replied: "The socialists are mostly active in the cities, among the industrial workers, whereas we mostly work in the villages."

In addition to his clashes with Catargiu, Dobrescu found himself competing with two left-wing factions of the National Liberal Party, respectively led by Spiru Haret and Nicolae Fleva. These now fought for the peasant vote, and openly attacked the landed gentry within their own party, in particular Dimitrie Sturdza. On various topical causes, Dobrescu worked with both Fleva and Haret, but also with other major figures in politics and militant culture, including Arghezi, Vasile Kogălniceanu, Ion Luca Caragiale, and Nicolae Filipescu. In the 1895 legislature, he and Moisescu intervened to propose bills for universal suffrage with proportional representation, supporting and being supported by Fleva, Morțun, Kogălniceanu, Nicu Ceaur-Aslan, George A. Scorțescu, and Iuniu Lecca. Nevertheless, Dobrescu was still adamantly opposed to Morțun's Marxism and the Romanian Social Democratic Workers' Party, possibly because the latter was also trying to win over peasant constituents—but also because Dobrescu respected the right of property and did not consider either an extensive land reform or centralized collective farming. According to the cultural sociologist Z. Ornea, Dobrescu and his party only offered "palliatives" to landless peasants, and as such "had no real mass basis, [were] weightless in political life."

As noted by Scurtu, Partida was effectively prevented from circulating its message outside speeches in the Assembly and the occasional electoral rally. Dobrescu soon found himself ignored by the establishment. As early as December 1895, Vlașca deputy V. Iepurescu heckled his speech on the peasants' physical degeneration—as the socialist press put it, Iepurescu's remarks were "of the stupidest and most demagogic kind". In the session of March 10, 1898, Dobrescu's interpellation about bootlegging ended inconclusively, as most of his colleagues got up and left the Assembly hall. He received some attention from Ion I. C. Brătianu, the new Minister of Public Works, who agreed with him on building a railway link between Curtea de Argeș and Câineni.

That year, Haret, who was serving as Education Minister, made a point of expressing his support for the agrarian movement, refusing to shut down Malul de Răsună (accused of generating "socialist propaganda"), and awarding its president, G. Rădulescu, a medal of merit. By then, Dobrescu had been formally indicted of falsifying an insurance policy and embezzling funds. In June 1898, he was arrested and sent to Văcărești Prison, but made bail. As reported by Filipescu's Epoca, his time in confinement was needlessly prolonged by hostile bailiffs, causing Dobrescu's mother to faint in public. However, the authorities discarded normal procedure, and left out biometrics when Dobrescu refused to comply, threatening to kill himself. During his interval in prison, he met Filipescu, who was being held there after killing Emanoil Lahovary in a duel—he and Filipescu became "friends for eternity."

Dobrescu-Argeș pleaded his case at the Correctional Tribunal, arguing that any counterfeiting was by his mistress, Elena Ionescu. This claim is backed by both Deaconu and Vrânceanu, according to whom Ionescu had been purposely misled by Niculescu-Fotografu, who now wanted Dobrescu neutralized, and who persuaded her that forging the insurance policy was in Dobrescu's best interest. One detailed account suggests that she signed Poinăreanu's name to a promissory note for one of Dobrescu's lenders, namely Predingher of Ploiești, and that, since Dobrescu ended up paying his debt, no damage had actually been incurred. Deaconu places blame on Pallade, who was serving as Minister of Justice, and whose grudge against Dobrescu mutated into "one of the greatest political frame-ups". Constituționalul newspaper also placed blame on Pallade and the examining magistrate, Virgiliu Alexandrescu, noting that the latter had a record of mistrials. In that context, Schileru and Dinescu were persuaded to intervene on their associate's behalf; Pallade responded to their messages in June 1898, when he called for "quashing the head of the hydra." Reportedly, he meant to ensure that Dobrescu would be prevented not just from taking part in politics, but also from practicing as a lawyer.

=== Disgrace, sentencing, and death ===
Valescu alleges that the Conservatives secretly rejoiced upon noting Pallade's efforts. He claims to quote Alexandru Marghiloman, a junior Conservative, arguing that "the parties ought to serve each other" when it came to subduing the peasant ethos. Various other accounts similarly suggest that Dobrescu was being framed by the ruling class, although such accusations had surfaced independently in earlier years. In 1889, the peasants of Mușătești had complained that Dobrescu, hired to legalize their land claims, had absconded with their money. According to legend, Dobrescu also financed his party selling worthless bonds to peasants across the country. The scheme was only uncovered when one of his invoices showed up in a bankruptcy lawsuit. He was subsequently derided by his adversaries as Dobrescu-Chitanță ("Dobrescu-Invoice").

Dobrescu's work in public subscription also collected funds for a statue of Tudor Vladimirescu, in Târgu Jiu. He began this project in March 1895, with articles in Gazeta Țăranilor, increasingly revolutionary in tone; he also oversaw the printing of a Vladimirescu biography. He was free by January 1899, and, against Pallade's warning, continued and stepped up his political involvement, publishing a new program for the peasant movement. Also in 1899, as he inaugurated the Vladimirescu statue, Dobrescu spoke about his mission of bringing about "rule of the people, by the people", "democracy in both name and fact." He issued samples of self-criticism for his previous legalism, noting that his imprisonment was engineered to "cast terror among my people". As he put it at the time: nu jenă trebuia să produc cârmuirii, ci la răsturnare trebuia să tind ("I should not have aimed for merely disturbing those in power, it is their toppling I should have aimed for").

During that year's elections, remnants of Partida formed local clubs that vied for seats—on this topic, Scurtu notes: "Government terror prevented any of its [Partida's] candidates from entering the Assembly of Deputies." Drăghicescu tried to obtain a seat for the Committee of Peasant Students, which he founded with Sergiu Victor Cujbă and Toma Dragu; he only managed to win as a National Liberal, in 1901. Also in 1899, Dobrescu himself was again rallying with the controversial candidate Alexandru Bogdan-Pitești, at Slatina. He acted as electoral agent among the peasants, promising them that Bogdan-Pitești would redistribute land from a national reserve. When his patron was defeated, the enraged peasants rioted and had to be repressed using military force. Various reports have it that Dobrescu-Argeș retired himself as a candidate in the same election after being told by government agents that the charges against him would be lifted as part of that deal. As a backup plan, the National Liberals had begun circulating a brochure by Niculescu-Fotografu, containing "all manner of calumnies and insults".

Meanwhile, Dobrescu's trial, in which he was represented by Fleva, came before the Ilfov County tribunal, being postponed there over the absence of witnesses. Finally receiving a nine-month jail term in February 1900, he was detained during the winter of 1900–1901. This left homeless his young disciples, including C. Marinescu Trubadurul, whom he had lodged in his home. Dobrescu was again free in mid 1901, when he was putting out, and almost exclusively contributing content for, the weekly magazine Viața Națională ("National Life"). It was return to his educational-focused agenda, describing schools as the necessary sources of "cultural nationalism". His term was reduced to three months in 1903, with Dobrescu serving his sentence at Văcărești. After being released, he was completely demoralized and soon disappeared from public life. The implications of his sentencing also included felony disenfranchisement, meaning that "he was practically removed from Romania's political life." According to notes left by Arghezi, Dobrescu was also prevented from returning to his ancestral homes by "posses" (haite) who chased him down to Bucharest. Arghezi also reports that Dobrescu was living on Știrbei Vodă Street with his wife or concubine, a "young peasant woman from Argeș".

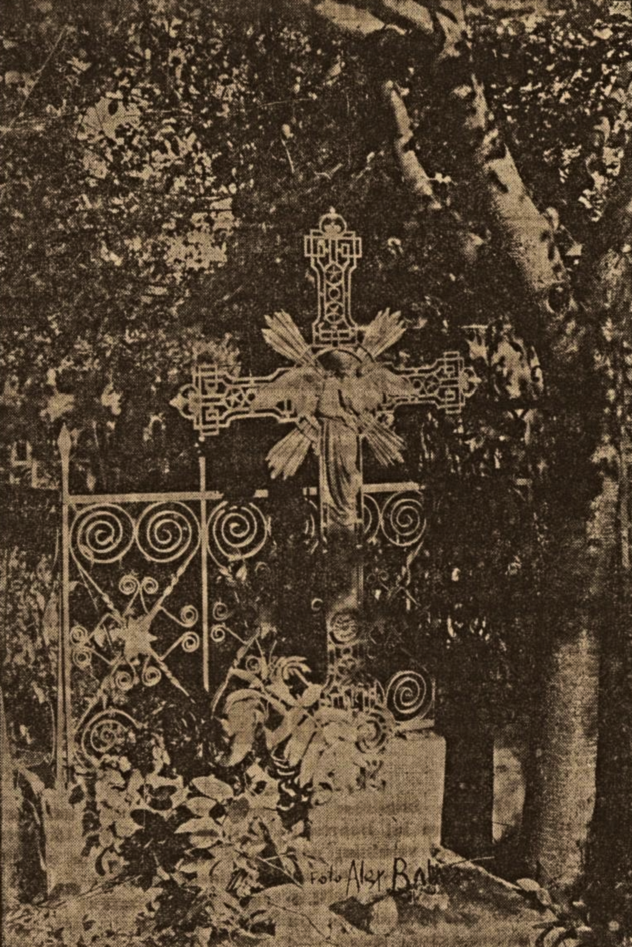
Dobrescu-Argeș's grave, c. 1933

Vrânceanu notes that the agrarianist leader was finally able to move back home to treat his debilitating "rheumatism" at the spas of Brădet, between Corbeni and Mușătești. Dobrescu-Argeș's clinical depression aggravated the disease, which manifested as ataxia and resulted in "great pain." He is credited as the founder of the Hydrotherapy Institute in that town, which opened in August 1902. Near the end of 1902, already paralyzed in both legs, he was taken from Bucharest to Mușătești. He was discreetly employed by Vasile Lascăr, the Interior Minister, to review or even draft new legislation. Filipescu, as the Agriculture Minister, handed him similar work; however, the conditions of his contract were reportedly determined by Lascăr, who had Dobrescu confined to a house in Bucharest and withheld payments. Dobrescu-Argeș lived to see the revival of his peasant theater, which, on August 6, 1903, staged his last play În sat sau la oraș ("In the Village or in the City") in front of an audience that included Minister Haret. 2,000 peasants reportedly attended this "grandiose cultural-artistic manifestation." During his final days, Dobrescu reportedly felt overwhelmed about political issues, including Conservative opposition to the administrative law he had been working on, telling Valescu: "They won't even let me die, those bandits".

Dobrescu-Argeș had his final stay in Bucharest in August–November 1903, after which he returned to Curtea de Argeș, then Mușătești. He was bedridden on arrival; according to Deaconu, his health was entirely compromised when a physician, who was also a National Liberal voter, advised him to drink plum brandy "that would cure his disease". The same author notes that, 70 years after the events, seniors in villages of the Vâlsan Valley still held it that Dobrescu had been murdered by the landowners. Dobrescu died in his mother's home on the evening of December 10, 1903, "after horrible suffering"; his burial outside Mușătești Church gathered a large mass of peasant mourners, and, though not present there, Justice Ion Mandrea, who had convicted Dobrescu-Argeș, voiced his regrets. Two days after the funeral ceremony, the University of Iași issued papers recognizing his doctoral diploma; these reportedly arrived alongside a gift of 2,000 lei from the Interior Ministry as payment for his services.

== Legacy ==
=== Political legatees ===
With time, left-wingers had become more lenient toward their deceased adversary. In January 1904, Mille wrote a column describing Dobrescu as an extraordinary orator, "eternal master of a constituency that had previously been thought of as a government fief". Sociologist Dumitru Drăghicescu, brother of Ștefan Drăghicescu, suggests that, "for all we know", the "peasant issue" was introduced on the Romanian political agenda by Dobrescu. The "brilliant and likeable forerunner" directly inspired his brother to publish his own magazine for the peasants, România Rurală, which came out in 1899–1900. Valescu and his friend Kogălniceanu also sought to preserve the gains, and, in September 1906, reestablished Partida Țărănească. Gazeta Țăranilor also continued to appear, with Valescu as publisher. On September 5, this venue hosted the two activists' appeal, which came to be signed by 40,000 peasants. Its new contributors included a young I. C. Vissarion, with satirical poems specifically targeting the landowners.

Gazeta accepted Kogălniceanu's leadership of the party, but maintained a Dobrescu-like stance on land reform, only favoring the renting of estates to cooperatives (rather than full redistribution among individual owners). This project blended with conservative populism through its deep association with Filipescu and the Epoca group, then was altogether thwarted by the peasants' revolt of 1907, which Valescu had ominously predicted. During the events, Kogălniceanu was found to be running a network which sold Romanian Orthodox icons "for pledges". News report of that period circulated a claim that, as early as 1897, Dobrescu had planned a "general conspiracy", in which sacred items and sermons would ensure secrecy and commitment to the cause. Both Kogălniceanu and Valescu were arrested, with their Gazeta being singled out as a "rebels' nest". The printing press was reportedly destroyed, and Valescu deported to Giurgiu—where he managed to set up a literacy school for other peasant prisoners. In the aftermath, police also confiscated Dobrescu's unpublished sociological tracts, as well as all letters kept by his family.

The agrarian movement went inactive for more than a decade. In 1908, Aurel Popovici of the right-wing Sămănătorul expressed thanks that the previous revolutionary events had failed in uprooting the "ruling class", and argued that democratization would have constituted a "moral abdication". In that context, he contrasted professional politicians with I. C. Frimu "the cobbler" and Dobrescu-Argeș "the peasant". In 1909, Sămănătorul novelist Mihail Sadoveanu described Gazeta Țăranilor as having renounced its mission of enlightening peasants: "[it] peddles all scandals, injustices and filth that one finds in the cities, and it both stirs up and puts down a man's soul". Although Valescu still convened a Congress of the Peasants in 1910, its demands were moderate, and its focus was on petitioning; other, more radical cells claiming the "peasants' party" pedigree were founded by Nicolae Basilescu and Alexandru Popescu-Berca. Overall, Valescu supported the reforms enacted by the National Liberal Party. As Drăghicescu notes, the latter now integrated a Poporanist current, and made the peasant issue, including advocacy for land reform, one of its core doctrines; Stoian similarly notes that Haret was successful in "making his own peasantism be annexed by liberalism."

By 1909, Dobrescu's other brother-in-law, P. T. Rădulescu, was a national representative in schoolteachers' organizations, allegedly using his position to advance the corrupt agenda of cooperative-bank managers. Valescu retired the Mușătești printing press in 1912, but continued to put out a newspaper, Vocea Argeșului, from Curtea de Argeș. Muscel schoolteacher Ion Mihalache, who was emerging as a leader of the agrarian movement, tried to visit Dobrescu-Argeș in 1903, and was informed of his death. He never read any of Dobrescu's writings until after 1918, but formed a secretive committee to network for the reestablishment of a peasantry party. Just before the elections of May 1914, Mihalache described himself a would-be "peasants' deputy", like Dobrescu, but also declared that he intended to remain politically independent of any parties, and of government influence. Reflecting back on this period, Arghezi called Mihalache "a distant descendant of Dobrescu-Argeș, so very less romantic, more positive, more concise". In 1915, a Dobrescu-Argeș Cultural Home was launched in Mușătești, alongside a local library with 5,000 titles and decimal classification. Around that time, with Romania still preserving neutrality in World War I, Valescu and Gazeta allegedly became mouthpieces of the Central Powers. Alexandru and Paraschiva's son Emil Valescu, who was aged 8 at his uncle's death, fought in the subsequent campaigns against the Central Powers, and became a Romanian Army Colonel.

=== Later echoes ===
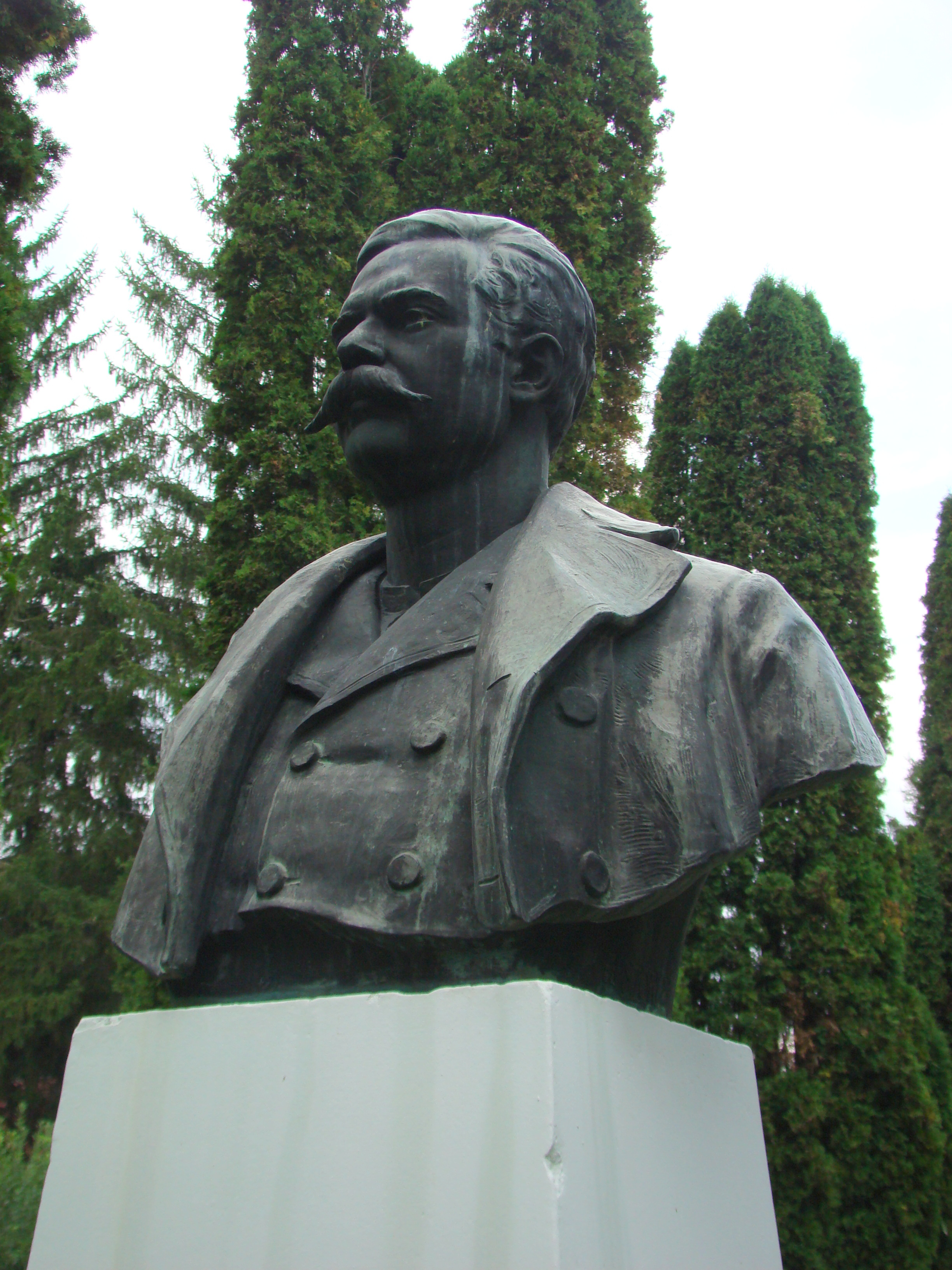
Bust of Dobrescu in Curtea de Argeș, by Frederic Storck

Ultimately, following World War I, land reform and universal suffrage were introduced throughout the newly established Greater Romania, making it possible for Mihalache to form his own Peasants' Party (PȚ) as the first of several interwar agrarianist movements. He was joined by Valescu, who took a Senate seat at Argeș in the elections of 1919. According to political essayist Pamfil Șeicaru, the party's solid win at Argeș, Muscel, and Dâmbovița was owed primarily to Dobrescu-Argeș's fieldwork in previous decades. The movement, in which "Dobrescu-Argeș's memory" was a "foundation stone", remained factionalized to a degree: in 1920, at Priboieni, the folklorist Constantin Rădulescu-Codin relaunched "Gazeta Țăranilor as a National Liberal mouthpiece, critical of Mihalache's policies. In 1924, right-wing poet Octavian Goga noted that the PȚ itself had drifted into "macabre promiscuity", and was destined to crumble. Goga asserted that: "Important countryside tribunes, once they are dazzled by the shiny flooring of this perfidious Capital City, swoon and fall down. You all remember how that poor fella Dobrescu-Argeș stumbled, and how much he had to repent for having discarded his ancestral home!"

The period came with an overall reevaluation of Dobrescu's role in the movement. A re-investigation of his politics was hampered by the destruction of his Țĕranul, issues of which are exceedingly rare; research was able to track down, but not recover, the flag used by Dobrescu in rallying peasants, which, in 1933, was "hidden away in a Gorj County village". By the 1930s, the consolidated National Peasants' Party (PNȚ) was claiming Dobrescu as its patriarch. An earlier bust done by Frederic Storck from live sittings was raised at Curtea de Argeș in October 1933. PNȚ leaders Mihalache and Armand Călinescu were guest speakers at that ceremony. The former's musings, published in Dreptatea, described Dobrescu and Partida as precedents in an "organic" movement for "Peasantism". Also for the occasion, Adevărul revisited its earlier stances, dedicating Dobrescu a retrospective and quoting him on its frontispiece. As argued therein by editor Tudor Teodorescu-Braniște, "most of [Dobrescu's] goals, to this day, are just goals". The land reform, he claimed, was haphazard and purposefully unsustainable; the enfranchisement was also compromised by "savage elections", and by Mihalache's own praise of corporatism.

By 1936, Mihalache, and, through him, Dobrescu, were drawing attention from Hungarian Romanian voters in Transylvania. In that context, journalist Endre Kakassy explained Dobrescu as Romania's own Áchim L. András. Serving as PNȚ chairman in October 1936, during the party's ten-year anniversary, Mihalache returned to praising Dobrescu as a political model—in the line of social revolutionaries such as Vladimirescu and Horea. As he argued at the time, these precursors had combined the "national instinct" with a "social character", with the PNȚ taking up the same cause. In January 1937, a "Dobrescu-Argeș Canteen" was founded by the PNȚ for rural peasants studying in Bucharest. Speaking at its inauguration rally, which doubled as an anti-fascist protest, Paul Bujor honored Dobrescu as the "precursor and martyr of peasantism". Pitești also hosted a Dobrescu-Argeș cooperative bank, managed by the PNȚ cadre Petre Gr. Dumitrescu. As noted in 1939 by sociologist Henri H. Stahl, Dobrescu had an enduring but paradoxical influence on Muscel's culture, where city-dwellers still dressed up in a modernized peasant costume—"this style was created and spread, quite intentionally, through propaganda, starting with Dobrescu-Argeș".

During the communist period, Dobrescu-Argeș was subjected to official criticism. In one novel of the period, Isac Ludo revisited the embezzling scandal, suggesting that other politicians were secretly admiring the leader of the "so-called peasants' party" for his criminal resourcefulness. Writing in 1957, literary critic Ion Roman described Gazeta as a voice of "diversionary political interests". Dobrescu's 1933 bust was moved out of the city center in 1961, to be replaced in 1969 by a statue of Vladislav Vlaicu; it was ultimately relocated in front of Curtea de Argeș Agricultural High School in 1996. By late 1968, the Mușătești library, having collected some 9,000 volumes, was scheduled for a southward relocation to Vâlsănești—its managers issued a letter of protest, noting that the latter village only had 50 regular readers. The authorities took interest during 1969, which was Dobrescu's 110th anniversary. Another bust was put up in Mușătești in May 1969, upon the opening ceremony for the local museum of history and ethnography. A cultural club and research society bearing Dobrescu's name were founded there in 1973, but remained largely inactive.

By then, Nicolae G. Teodorescu and Onița Gligor had published monographs seeing to understand Dobrescu and his cause through the lens of "historical materialism". Writing for the schoolteachers' magazine Tribuna Școlii in 1973, Marieta Bursuc described him as a "tribune of the working youth." In 1974, the Romanian Communist Party Institute of Studies officially designated him a representative of the "numerically weak village bourgeoisie", noting that his solutions "could not lead to solving the basic social problems of the oppressed masses, urban as well as rural." In 1980, Scurtu similarly noted that Partida's "exclusively legal" activity had "contributed to demobilizing the peasantry, which had been orienting itself toward revolutionary combat." Dobrescu's life and work were again reviewed positively after the Romanian Revolution of 1989. The Agricultural High School in Curtea de Argeș was named after him in 1990, as was a street in Pitești.
