= Ghenadie Petrescu =

Romanian Orthodox metropolitan bishop (1863–1896)

His Eminence Ghenadie Petrescu
- Metropolitan-Primate of Romania
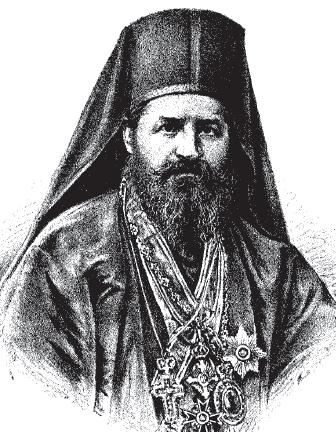
- Etching of Metropolitan Ghenadie, ca. 1893
- Church: Romanian Orthodox
- Archdiocese: Bucharest
- Elected: 1893
- Term ended: 1896
- Predecessor: Iosif Gheorghidan
- Successor: Iosif Gheorghidan
- Other post: Bishop of Argeș

Orders
- Ordination: 1854 or 1858

Personal details
- Born: March 1836 Bucharest
- Died: August 31, 1918 (aged 82) Căldărușani Monastery

Ghenadie Petrescu (Romanian pronunciation: [ɡeˈnadi.e peˈtresku]; March 1836 – August 31, 1918) was a Wallachian, later Romanian priest of the national Orthodox church, who served as Metropolitan-Primate of Romania from 1893 to 1896. Ghenadie was a monk and hieromonk steadily progressing through church ranks, and becoming Bishop of Argeș in 1875. While tending to this congregation, he established his reputation as philanthropist, art patron, and writer on historical subjects. Ghenadie also preserved an interest in politics, espousing a nationalist Orthodox agenda and finding himself allies on both sides of Romania's two-party system, Conservative and National Liberal.

As Metropolitan, Ghenadie became tangled in a political controversy which tested the issues of separation between church and state, and ruined his close relationship with Prime Minister Dimitrie A. Sturdza. The conflict became one between Ghenadie and the Romanian Synod, whose civilian members opted to depose him. Ghenadie earned support from the opposition Conservatives, and was energetically defended in print by poet Alexandru Macedonski. His decision to contest the Synod resulted in his banishment to Căldărușani Monastery, as a simple monk. Large swathes of the public rallied behind him, causing protests and riots against the Sturdza government.

Although the Synod showed its readiness to reinstate Ghenadie, the latter did not follow suit, and spent the remainder of his life at Căldărușani. In 1909, he was made Starets for life. His final activities were in the field of art conservation.

== Biography ==
=== Early career ===
Ghenadie Petrescu was born in the Wallachian capital of Bucharest, in 1836. His parents were of lowly origins, and his native home was in Hagiului mahala. The future priest received his elementary education at a parish school, that of Domnița Bălașa Church. According to some sources, he took orders at Căldărușani Monastery, Ilfov County, in 1854. Others mention that this happened only in 1858, at Cernica Monastery.

Within four years, he was dispatched to the Metropolitan diocese of Bucharest, where he functioned as Deacon (Archdeacon as of 1865). In parallel, Ghenadie trained for the priesthood, was received into its ranks in 1869, eventually serving as the Metropolitan's Ecclesiarch. According to his biographical profile the literary magazine Familia (April 1894), he became one of the first Romanian clergymen to live up to modern expectations, as both an educated priest and a promoter of education. Ghenadie was however noted for not having followed the academic path of theology, and for not having attended public school.

In the 1860s, Ghenadie was intervening in the large political debate agitating Romania: the issue of naturalization for residents not baptized into Eastern Orthodoxy. His was vocal among the anti-reform clergy, at a time when the Church threatened to excommunicate those politicians who acted in favor of reforming the citizenship law. In 1865, he argued that there was no compatibility between Jewish, Catholic or Protestant residents and the term "Romanians". He later expanded on such subjects, helping to enshrine the notion of communion between church, nation and state, and arguing: "The Church is the foundation stone of any State, and the State cannot exist without it". His discourse has been read as a precursor to the theocracy envisaged in the 1930s by nationalist Orthodox thinkers (Nichifor Crainic, Gheorghe Racoveanu, Dumitru Stăniloae, etc.).

With time, Ghenadie became close to the Conservative Party, whose cabinets appointed him to high office. In 1874, when Titu Maiorescu was Minister of Religious Affairs, Ghenadie was unanimously voted an Archiereus by the Romanian Synod. He was assigned to the Argeș Bishopric in February 1875, when Petre P. Carp was head of the Ministry. His selection coincided with a period of "consolidation", which cemented the reforms of the previous period, when the United Principalities had become the modern Romanian state and the church hierarchies had been fused together. The former Bishop of Argeș, also named Ghenadie, had taken part in the effort to consolidate the international prestige of Romanian Orthodoxy, by participating in bilateral meetings with the Old Catholic Church.

=== As Bishop of Argeș ===
After serving for a year as the Vicar, Ghenadie Petrescu became recognized as the new Bishop of Argeș. According to Familia, he had an outstanding profile: "He spent over 17 years in this office, serving at the Lord's altar, advancing the clergy's prosperity and the people's instruction, rendering good advice to each and all and, like all good Christians and Romanians, sacrificing large sums for the churches and schools in his care. [...] His philanthropic zeal and his generosity for the poor are well-known to the public." Constantin Dobrescu-Argeș, a journalist and activist from the Curtea de Argeș area, also remembered: "The lower clergy and all the Eparchy have seen him stepping into each and every hamlet, into the most secluded human dwellings; they heard him preaching the awakening, the encouragement and the rebirth of national and religious sentiment among the people. Instead of 400 wooden churches, which could barely stand to be called houses of prayer, he erected 400 temples, beautiful as far as taste and comfort go." During his reign, several new monasteries were reestablished within the Argeș Diocese, at Stănișoara, Ostrov, Turnu etc.

It was under Ghenadie's direction that restoration work was completed on Curtea de Argeș Cathedral, receiving words of praise from a visiting King of Romania, Carol I. Ghenadie oversaw the (re)building of an Orthodox Seminary in Curtea de Argeș, and, in 1888, contributed to the new reliquary of Dimitrie Basarabov. The artifact, of fine silver, was paid for with Ghenadie's personal revenue and with funds collected from his congregation, and specially crafted by famed Russian Romanian silversmith Teodor Filipov. Ghenadie also oversaw the creation of a new reliquary to host the remains of Saint Filofteia.

The bishop's religious life was doubled by involvement in secular activities. Dobrescu-Argeș credits Ghenadie Petrescu with having been an active participant in all public works done for the benefit of the region, from the boulevard cutting across Curtea de Argeș to the railway network which connected it to the world. Dobrescu-Argeș received money from Ghendie to set up, at Mușătești, "the first printing press and bookbinder ever to have functioned in a rural commune." After 1888, there was even an interest in spiritism: Ghenadie is recorded as one of the regular guests of writer and National Liberal polemicist Bogdan Petriceicu Hasdeu, attending séances where Theodor Speranția was the medium. From 1889, Ghenadie also published 8 volumes of anthology, Acte și documente privind renașterea României ("Papers and Documents on the Rebirth of Romania"). The latter project had been a cherished dream of National Liberal politician and amateur historian Dimitrie A. Sturdza, and sought to provide readers with a guide to Romania's 19th century.

Bishop Ghenadie was a candidate for the Metropolitan seat in 1885, and gained significant support. Dobrescu-Argeș later claimed that Ghenadie withdrew from the race after the National Liberal lobby, who supported Iosif Gheorghidan for the position, asked him to do so; there was no grudge preserved between the two contestants, with Ghenadie canvassing votes for Iosif. When Metropolitan Iosif resigned in early 1893, Ghenadie was one of the first choices for the seat: in May, the Synod and Parliament of Romania both voted him in as leader the Romanian Church. Since Ghenadie lacked formal training, the regulation on such appointments had to be modified. He received his investiture from King Carol I, on May 21.

=== As Metropolitan ===
Ghenadie's short rule witnessed few national events. It is however remembered as the time when Romania's royal family, a Hohenzollern branch, had its first born-Orthodox members: Ghenadie personally baptized Carol and Elisabeth, the children of heir-apparent Ferdinand. Once ordained Metropolitan, Ghenadie did not interrupt his activities as a scholar, and, in 1894, published Evangheliile. Studiu istorico-literar și Autenticitatea Evangheliilor în genere ("The Gospels. A Historical-Literary Study and On the Overall Authenticity of the Gospels"). He was still preoccupied with church art and architecture, and, in 1894, arranged for the restoration of Bucharest's Darvari Skete.

Ghenadie held a de jure seat in the Senate of Romania, and was President of the Naturalization Commission, which mainly assessed requests made by non-emancipated Romanian Jews. He was thus involved in the controversy surrounding Lazăr Șăineanu (Lazare Sainéan), a Jewish scholar whose application was repeatedly rejected by the antisemitic lobby. Șăineanu was at the time still supported by his fellow linguist Hasdeu, and noted that the three of them spent a few days' vacation in Câmpina. Although the Ghenadie's Commission ruled in his favor (December 1893), the decision to naturalize Șăineanu was blocked out by National Liberal leaders such as Dimitrie Sturdza and V. A. Urechia.

The period also brought another scandal: Ghenadie found himself at odds with parts of the establishment, at a time when the Orthodox Church was being governed under a new statute, allowing for extended public control exercised by civilian members of the Synod. The statute was hotly opposed by members of the clergy: as Protosyngel Miron Cristea noted in 1909, Ghenadie's rule coincided with a nadir for the nation's clergymen. Metropolitan Iosif's own criticism of such legislation, as endorsed by the Conservatives, had been a factor in his decision to leave office. Shortly before coming to power as Prime Minister, Sturdza spoke out against the new legislation.

The clash between the Metropolitan and the civil administration was followed the baptism of Crown Prince Carol. Ghenadie selected the baptismal font, a relic of the Domnița Bălașa Church collection, and, following the ceremony, offered it as a gift to King Carol; he later tried to console Domnița Bălașa priests by sending them a replica of the font. According to one account, the Metropolitan also alienated his royal hosts by not making an exception to the Orthodox custom of administering the baptism, which involved sinking their baby into the font. A parallel conflict, resonating throughout the Balkans, took place between Ghenadie and Neophytus VIII, the Ecumenical Patriarch of Constantinople. It reflected mounting tension between Greeks, represented by Neophytus' Greek Orthodox Church, and Aromanians, who were under Romanian state protection. On official visit to the Aromanians of Macedonia, Metropolitan Ghenadie held mass in the Romanian vernacular, prompting the Patriarch to demand that the Romanian Synod sanction its leader.

Another point of contention was Ghenadie's relationship with Premier Sturdza. The Conservatives believed that, in seeking to display his friendship for Ghenadie, the Premier was being hypocritical. This point of view is expressed in O lichea ("A Scoundrel" or "A Stain"), a lampoon by Conservative opinion maker Ion Luca Caragiale, who alleged that, once designated head of cabinet, Sturdza embarrassed the church by insisting to prostrate himself in front of its leader. Although equivocal, the piece remains one of Caragiale's most charged and crudest articles.

According to theologian Paul Brusanowski, Sturdza's arrival to power inaugurated an irregular "companionship" between the leader of the cabinet and the leader of the church. Ghenadie broke tradition when he invited Sturdza to attend a meeting of the Safta Brâncoveanu Foundation, the church's main charity outlet. This vexed other stakeholders, in particular the Bibescu and Știrbei families of donors, and Ghenadie replied to their objections by cutting off the church's share in the budget.

=== Dismissal and political backlash ===
While Sturdza withdrew from the affair so as not to provoke the king's anger, the Bibescus took steps to place Ghenadie under church indictment. The Synod put Ghenadie on trial (an abusive trial, according to some later commentators) at its Sf. Dumitru Church quarters. On May 20, 1896, it decided to strip Ghenadie of his ecclesiastical office, and initially defrocked him altogether.

Ghenadie's dismissal was especially controversial: according to Familia, the event "shook temperaments" in Bucharest and made "a lively impression" on Transylvanian observers. The same paper noted "great agitation" in Romania, and cited official protests from within the Conservative opposition and the breakaway faction of Nicolae Fleva. While some early commentators noted that, above all, the dismissal was a political move, Paul Brusanowski argues that the ousted church leader was the one maneuvering through his political connections. According to Brusanowski, Fleva's conflict with Sturdza and his alliance with the Conservatives were entirely provoked by Ghenadie, in an attempt to preserve his position. Another voice to make public its support for the cause, in hopes that the government would topple, was Conservative figure Take Ionescu, who spoke for a larger group of Bucharest citizens. A notorious defender of Ghenadie was Alexandru Macedonski, the rebellious poet and journalist. Especially for the purpose, he created the propaganda gazette Liga Ortodoxă ("The Orthodox League"). He was joined in this effort by Fleva and by various other public figures: journalist Eugen Vaian, poet Tudor Arghezi, writer and future priest Gala Galaction.

In June 1896, Ghenadie received an order from the Attorney General to vacate the Metropolitan's Palace. He objected, arguing that the Synod had broken the governing law, and stating that he would only leave if presented with a Royal Decree. As a consequence, Ghenadie was taken into custody by the authorities, driven out of the Palace through a side door, and taken by Romanian Police carriage to Căldărușani Monastery, where his banishment came in effect. Reportedly, the prosecutors caused embarrassment when they also proceeded to evacuate Ghenadie's friends and supporters, including Conservative politico Lascăr Catargiu, out of the repossessed building. A while after, Carol signed a Royal Decree confirming his government's decision, and the interim leadership was left to a triumvirate of bishops: Partenie Clinceni, Iosif Naniescu, Gherasim Timuș.

The central press covered the clash with much interest, especially as Ghenadie's place of exile was initially kept a secret. Criticized for its sensationalism, Adevărul daily sent reporter Vespasian Pella on Ghenadie's trail immediately after the Palace incidents, and, on the next day, published Pella's exclusive interview with the former Metropolitan. Sympathetic journalists and politicians coalesced, organizing a pilgrimage to Căldărușani and a rally at Bucharest's Dacia Hall (said to have been one of the most important gatherings of the period). The orators included Conservatives such as Fleva and Alexandru Lahovary, alongside disgruntled Liberals (Gheorghe Gh. Mârzescu, George D. Pallade).

Angry, sometimes violent, protests continued in Bucharest for the next few months, peaking on November 18. At that moment, the pro-Ghenadie crowd attempted to storm into Senate and were met with excessive force by the Gendarmes, leading to a street battle in front of University quarters. The matter was only solved by a new National Liberal cabinet, presided upon by Petre S. Aurelian and having Vasile Lascăr as head of Internal Affairs. This new administration, formed around National Liberals who opposed Sturdza, was entirely dedicated to a new settlement in the Ghenadie affair. Lascăr, who took credit for the pacification, later claimed that the Conservatives had been stoking the fire of popular discontent without assuming the responsibilities.

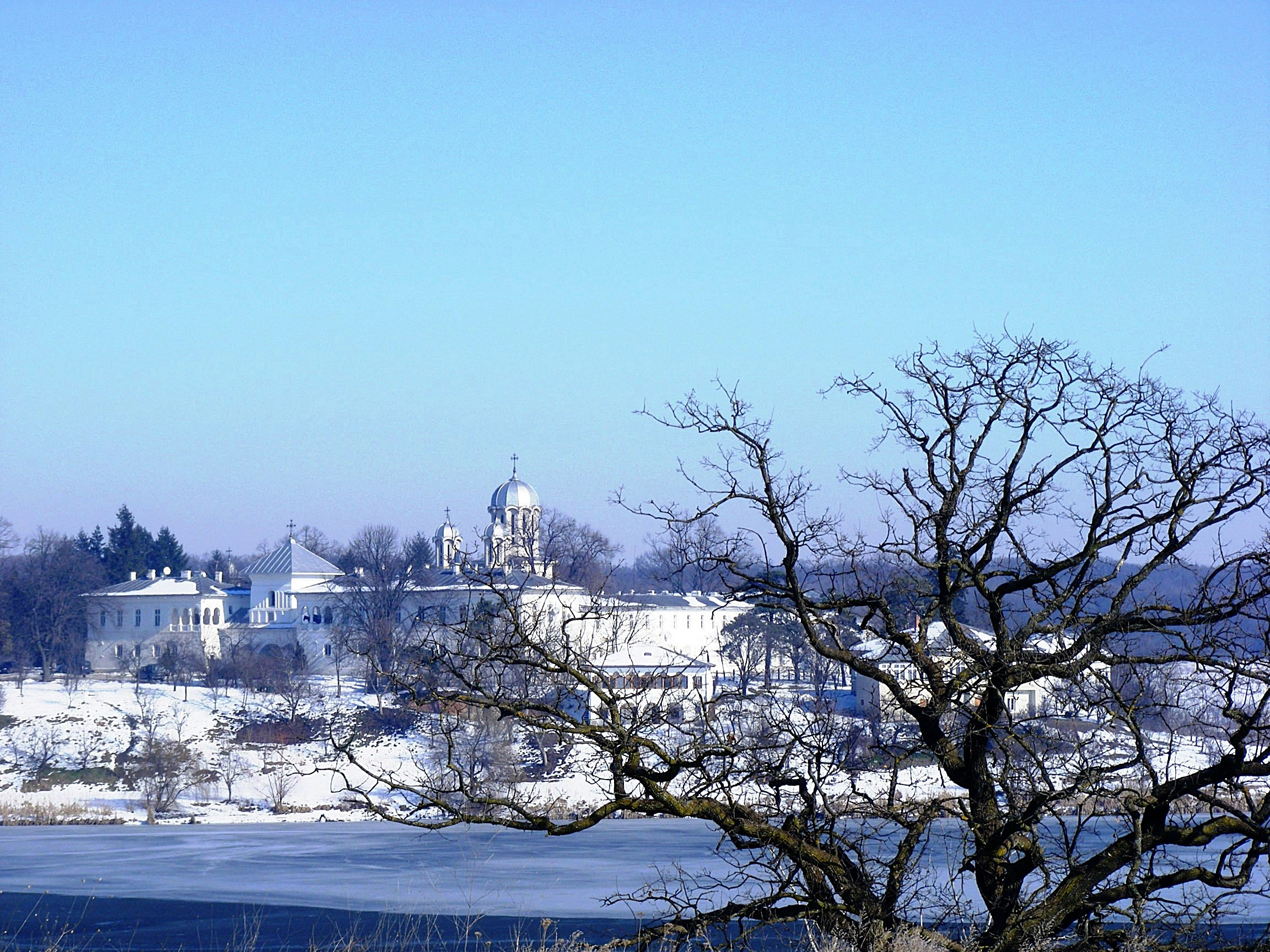
Căldărușani Monastery (2011 photograph)

In short while, pilgrimages to Căldărușani became the object of derision: in one instance, a group of eccentric high school students passing themselves off as the press made a noisy descent on the monastery, dined at the monks' expense, and even arranged an interview with Ghenadie. The prank was organized by friends Urmuz, the future writer, and George Ciprian, later a comedian and playwright. As Ciprian recalled in the 1950s, Ghenadie was not upset when uncovering their subterfuge, and spoke to them about the injustices of his dismissal.

=== Later life ===
Despite receiving strong support, Ghenadie formally obeyed the Synod's orders. Instead, he attacked the decision on legal grounds, hired himself a team of lawyers, and went to court. In the end, the Synod decided to overturn the defrocking, but Ghenadie was no longer fighting for recognition. On December 4, 1896, he was even formally reinstated, but withdrew on the same day. Iosif Gheorghidan returned to the Metropolitan seat for a second reign.

Macedonski was surprised by this turn of events. He shut down Liga Ortodoxă, and, in 1898, published the brochure Falimentul clerului ortodox român ("The Bankruptcy of the Romanian Orthodox Clergy"), with such verdicts as: "however vile a clergy may be, [it] will not go bankrupt lest its leader force it into bankruptcy." Macedonski suggested that the entire scenario was undignified, noting that, in Catholicism, Church leaders were still refusing to sign a demeaning concordat with the Italian Kingdom; he called Ghenadie's legal battle "ridiculous". The poet's sense of frustration also led him to compose a "Psalm of Ghenadie".

In Catholic circles, Ghenadie's dismissal was reported as a clue that the Orthodox Church was in crisis. Das Vaterland journal, published in neighboring Austria-Hungary by the Christian Social movement, announced: "all this quarrel between bishop and synod, and the entire situation of the Romanian church, is a new supporting argument for old experienced fact, namely that the Eastern Church, as broken away from Rome, shall never flourish, but will advance resolutely toward internal and external decomposition." Ghenadie's guilt was under constant reassessment by the Synod, reflecting political competitions outside the Romanian Orthodox Church. According to Miron Cristea, the institution shamed itself further by yielding to outside pressures, particularly since the Synod appeared unconvinced about the truth of its own convictions: "Only in a state of decay can one proceed in this manner." Similarly, Brusanowski argues: "the Synod [was forced] to render two mutually exclusive verdicts. It is therefore blasphemous and a sign of disrespect to state, as some prelates have done repeatedly [...], that all decisions of an episcopal Synod are inspired by the Holy Ghost."

In compensation for the loss of his see, Ghenadie was appointed a lifetime Starets of his place of exile, with a special law passed in 1909. He took an active part in restoring and refurbishing the monastery complex, which had been heavily damaged by time, and intervened on sites outside his jurisdiction. Early on, in 1904, he intervened at Zamfira Monastery, where he demanded that the murals done by painter Nicolae Grigorescu be covered up with tempera artwork—his order was obeyed, and the result remains one of the most controversial acts. Some have described it as virtually an act of vandalism, and, 50 years later, the process was reverted on church orders. Ghenadie requested, and received, King Carol's patronage for the Căldărușani restoration works (begun in 1908), and hired artist D. Belizarie to recondition its archaic murals. In 1915, he personally oversaw the festive reopening of Căldărușani Church.

Ghenadie Petrescu was honored by Bucharest citizens, his name assigned to a street downtown—the present-day Labirint Street. In 2009, author Ioana Pârvulescu made the deposed Metropolitan a character in her historical novel Viața începe vineri ("Life Begins on Friday").
