= Râul Boului =

Râul Boului may refer to:

- Râul Boului, a tributary of the Bistrița in Gorj County
- Râul Boului, a tributary of the Toplița in Argeș County
