= Vâlsan =

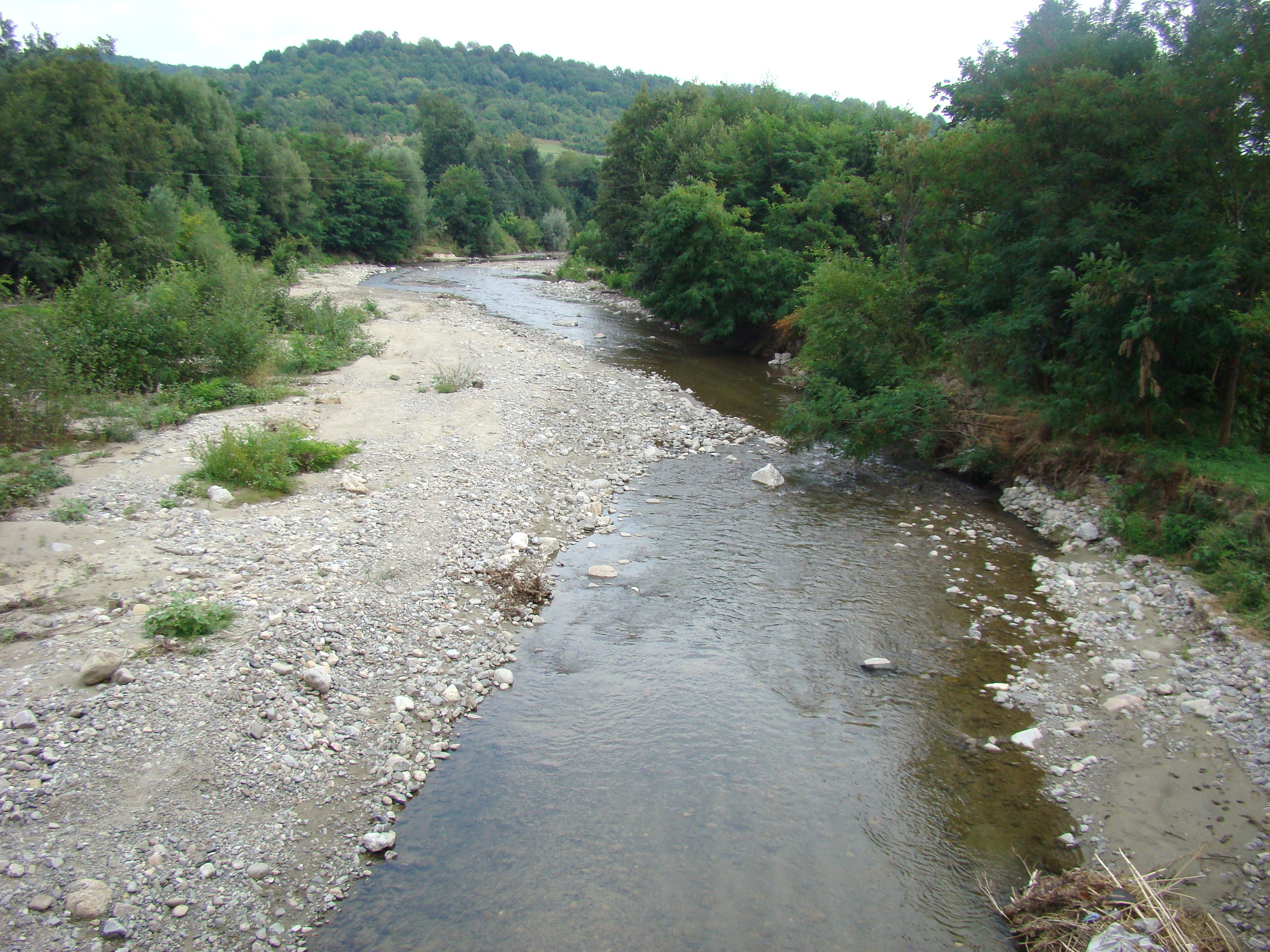

- Location within Romania

Location
- Country: Romania
- Counties: Argeș County
- Villages: Brăduleț, Vâlsănești, Mălureni

Physical characteristics
- Mouth: Argeș
  - location: Merișani
  - coordinates: 44.9726°N 24.7543°E
- Length: 79 km (49 mi)
- Basin size: 348 km^{2} (134 sq mi)

Basin features
- Progression: Argeș→ Danube→ Black Sea

The Vâlsan is a left tributary of the river Argeș in Romania. It discharges into the Argeș near Merișani. Its length is 79 km (49 mi) and its basin size is 348 km^{2} (134 sq mi).

The Vâlsan originates in the Făgăraș Mountains, where its source is a trough-shaped glacial hollow located between the Picuiata and Scărișoara Mare mountains. The river flows for a mere 84.6 kilometers. Its course runs parallel to the Argeș River. The Vâlsan River's mouth is located at Merișani.

In 1967 the Vâlsan's course was altered significantly by the construction of a reservoir and a hydroelectric plant.

== Tributaries ==
The following rivers are tributaries to the river Vâlsan (from source to mouth):

- Left tributaries: Zănoguța, Dobroneagu, Râul Cheii
- Right tributaries: Izvorul Dimei, Izvorul Popii, Robaia, Valea Părului, Șoptana, Toplița, Bunești

== Haven for a fish species ==
Although a minor river in comparison to other European rivers, the Vâlsan is of importance as one of the few rivers that supports the fish species Romanichthys valsanicola. This species is endemic to Romania and the Danube basin. The species is regarded as the most endangered species of European ichthyofauna given its small habitat range and low surviving numbers.
