= Diocese of Argeș =

Diocese of Argeș may refer to the following ecclesiastical jurisdictions :

- the suppressed (Roman Catholic) Latin Diocese of Argeș
- the Romanian Orthodox Archdiocese of Argeș and Muscel
