= Căldărușani Monastery =

Romanian Orthodox monastery

- Mănăstirea Căldărușani
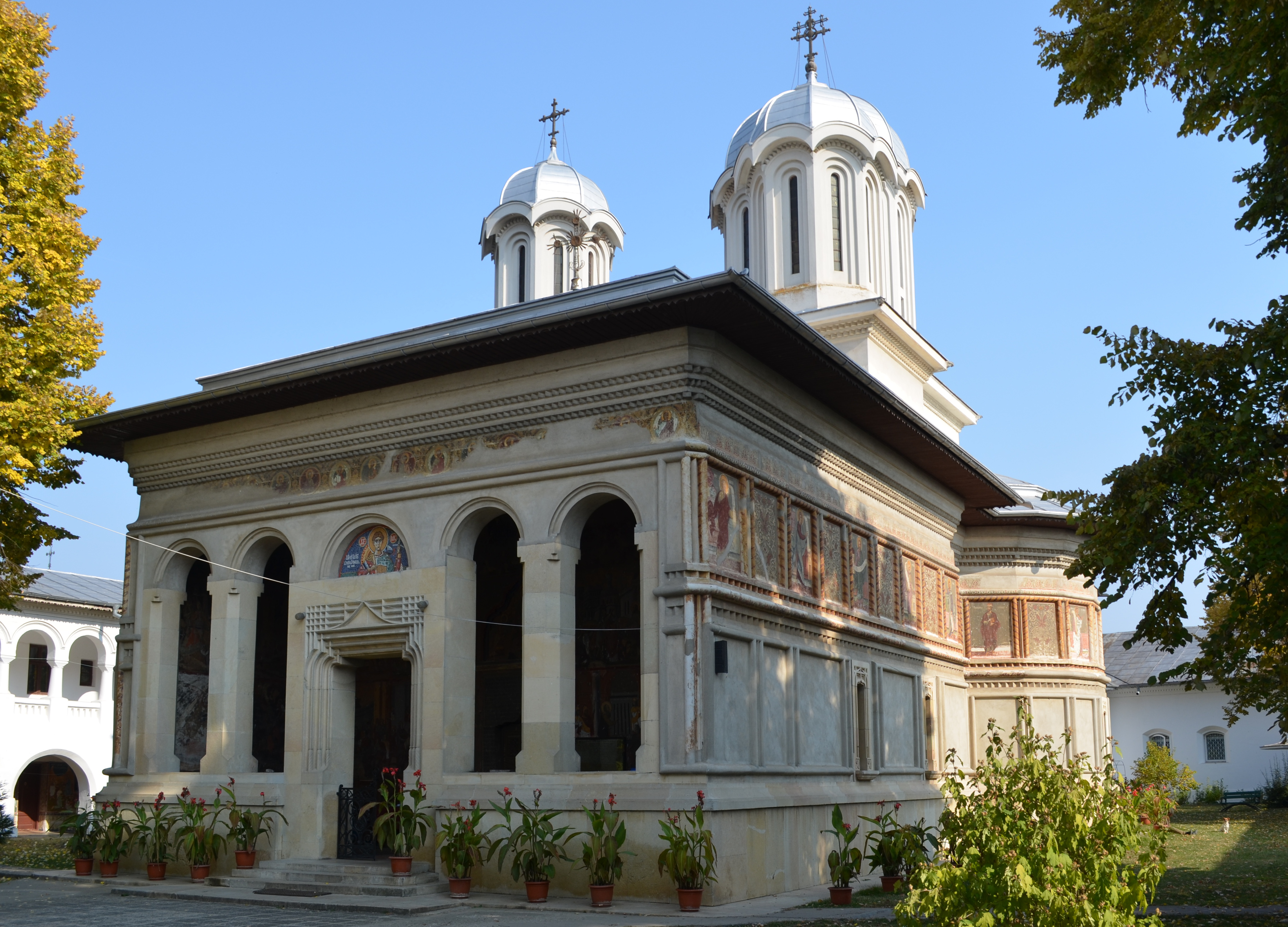
- Căldărușani Monastery in 2011

- Location within Romania
- Interactive map of Căldărușani Monastery

Monastery information
- Order: Orthodox monks
- Denomination: Romanian Orthodox
- Established: 1638
- Dedication: Saint Demetrius, Saint John the Evangelist
- Celebration: Saint Demetrius on October 26, Saint John on September 26

People
- Founder: Matei Basarab

Architecture
- Heritage designation: Historic monument
- Style: Neoclassicism
- Completion date: 1638

Site
- Location: Gruiu, Ilfov
- Country: Romania
- Coordinates: 44°40′32.56″N 26°16′0.62″E
- Public access: yes
- Website: https://manastireacaldarusani.ro/

Căldărușani Monastery (Romanian: Mănăstirea Căldărușani) is a Romanian Orthodox monastery located in the town of Gruiu, Ilfov County, Romania, by the Căldărușani Lake. The monastery complex is listed as a historic monument and includes several significant buildings and a rich collection of Romanian art.

== History ==
Established in 1638 by Matei Basarab, a prominent Wallachian ruler, Căldărușani Monastery has been a significant center for Orthodox spirituality and Romanian culture. The monastery was built on the site of an older wooden skete, evidencing monastic activity at this location prior to its official founding. It became known for its scriptorium and played a pivotal role in the development of the Romanian literary language.

The main church, dedicated to Saint Demetrius, features architecture reminiscent of the great ecclesiastical buildings of the era, such as Curtea de Argeș Cathedral. Notable for its educational and cultural contributions, the monastery housed a printing press and was a center for religious art, attracting figures such as the famous Romanian painter Nicolae Grigorescu.

== Architecture ==
The architectural style of the monastery is predominantly Neoclassical, with elements that reflect the traditional Orthodox ecclesiastical design. The complex includes several buildings, notably the main church dedicated to Saint Demetrius, and smaller churches dedicated to other saints, surrounded by lush greenery and situated beside a serene lake.

== Art and Culture ==
The monastery's art collection, initiated by Metropolitan Ghenadie Petrescu, includes works by Nicolae Grigorescu and other Romanian artists. It serves as a cultural repository reflecting the rich spiritual and artistic traditions of the Romanian Orthodox Church.

== Gallery ==
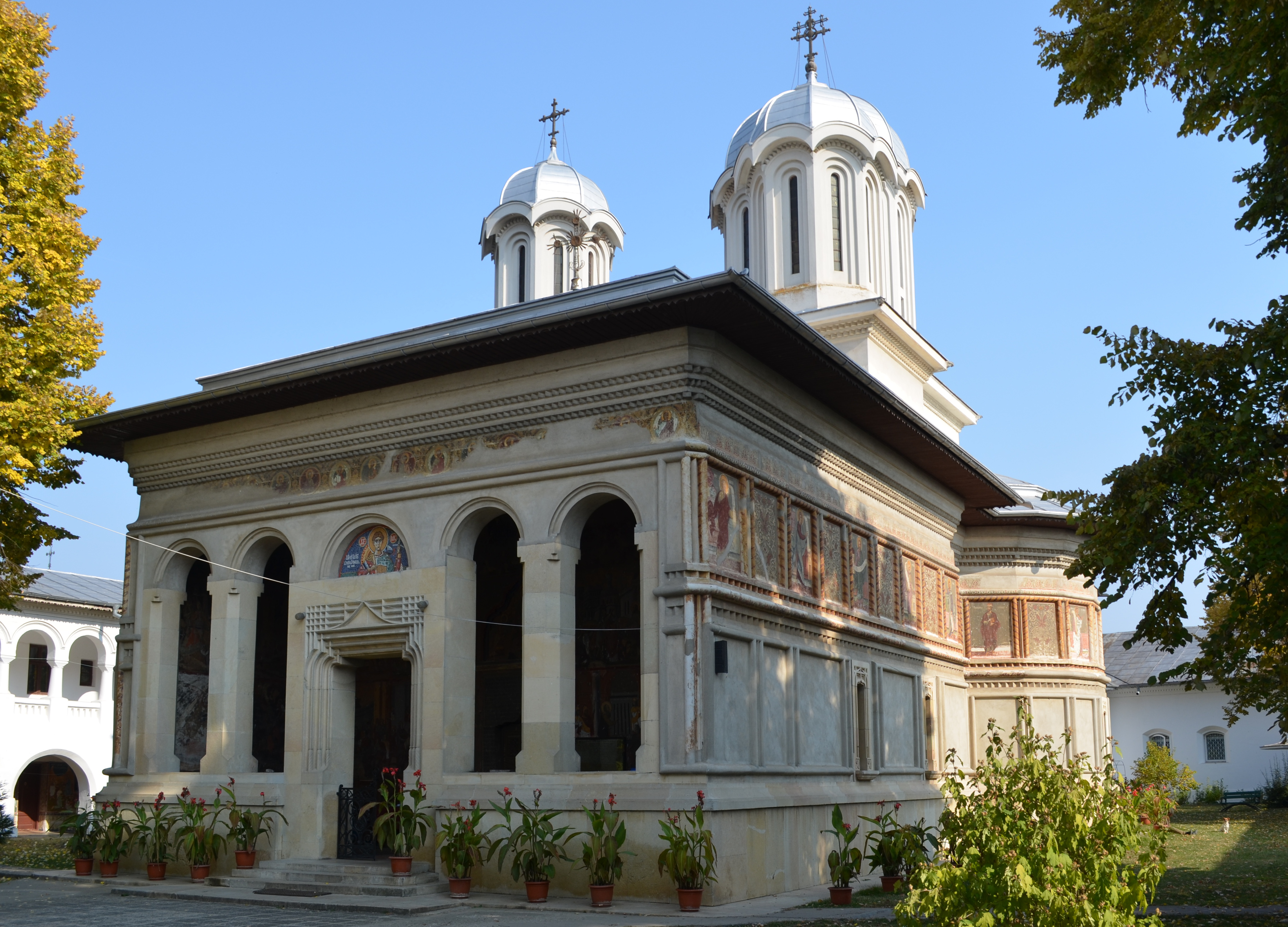
Căldărușani Monastery

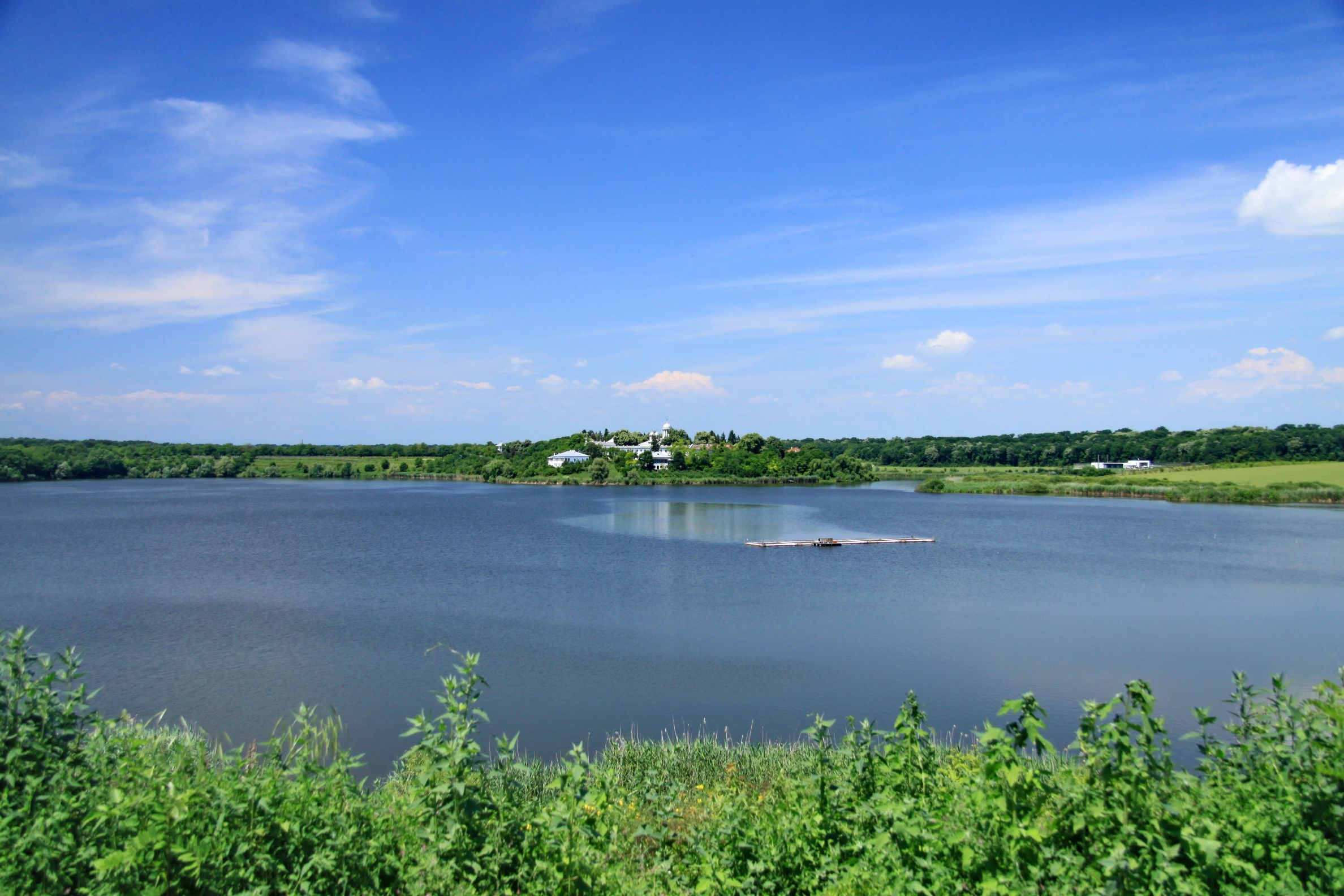
The monastery viewed from the southeast over the lake.

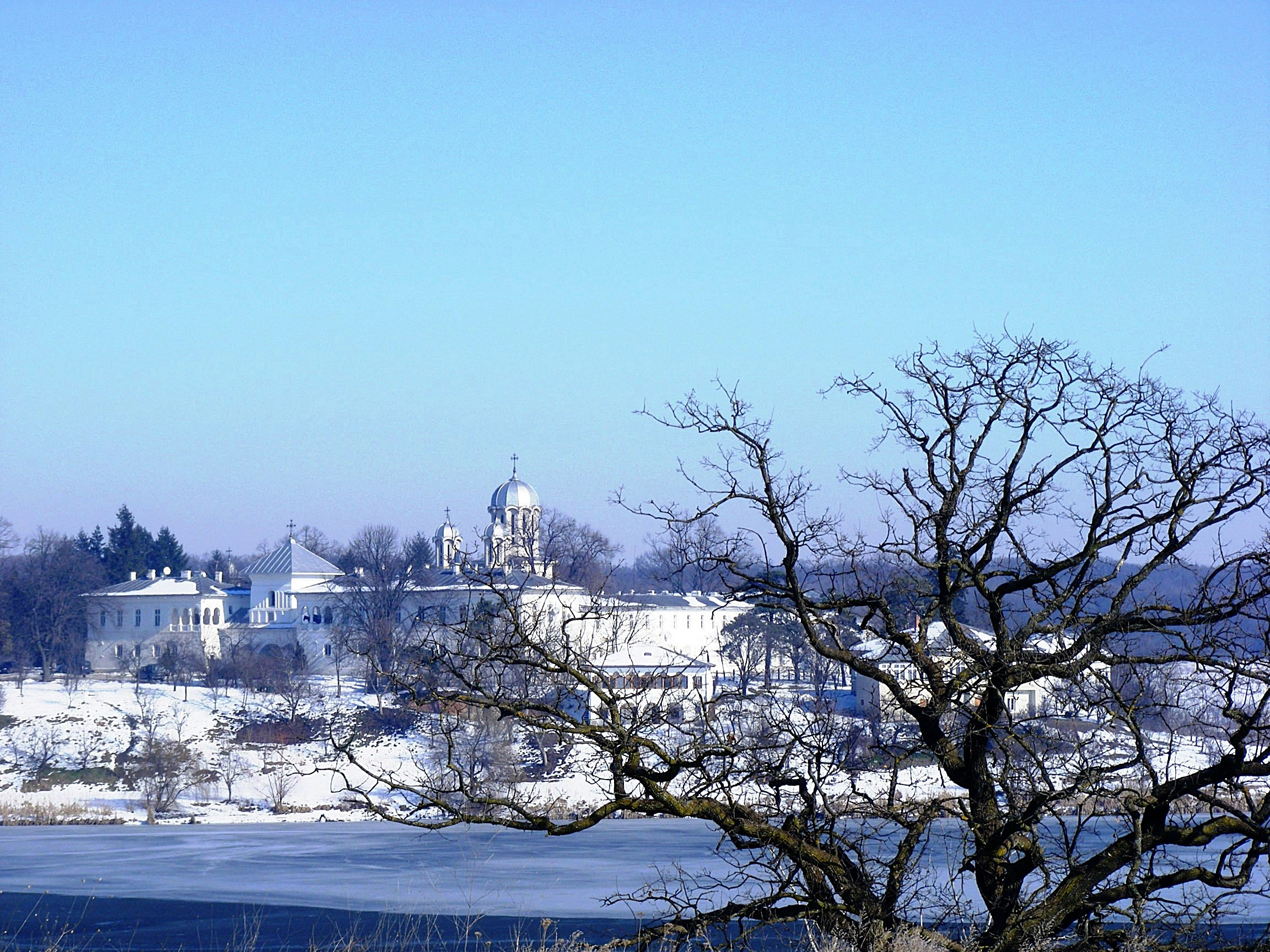
The monastery in winter 2011.
