= Toplița (Vâlsan) =

- Location within Romania

Location
- Country: Romania
- Counties: Argeș County
- Villages: Toplița

Physical characteristics
- Mouth: Vâlsan
  - location: Zărnești
  - coordinates: 45.0380°N 24.7870°E
- Length: 12 km (7.5 mi)
- Basin size: 29 km^{2} (11 sq mi)

Basin features
- Progression: Vâlsan→ Argeș→ Danube→ Black Sea
- Tributaries
  - left: Valea Boului

The Toplița is a right tributary of the river Vâlsan in Romania. It flows into the Vâlsan in Zărnești. Its length is 12 km (7.5 mi) and its basin size is 29 km^{2} (11 sq mi).
