= Robaia (river) =

- Location within Romania

Location
- Country: Romania
- Counties: Argeș County
- Villages: Robaia

Physical characteristics
- Mouth: Vâlsan
  - location: Robaia
  - coordinates: 45.2180°N 24.7780°E
- Length: 12 km (7.5 mi)
- Basin size: 17 km^{2} (6.6 sq mi)

Basin features
- Progression: Vâlsan→ Argeș→ Danube→ Black Sea

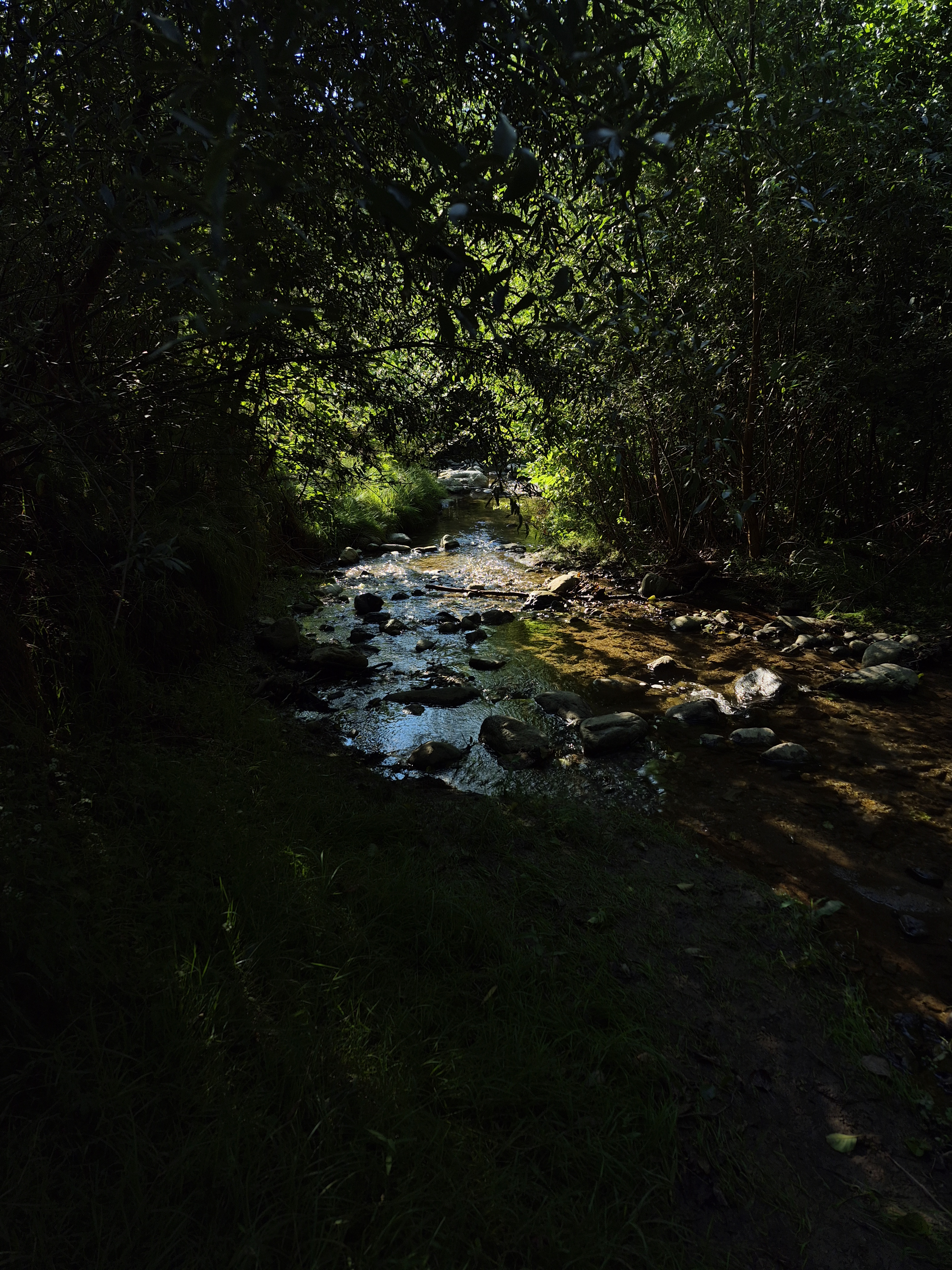

The Robaia is a right tributary of the river Vâlsan in Romania. It flows into the Vâlsan in the village Robaia. Its length is 12 km (7.5 mi) and its basin size is 17 km^{2} (6.6 sq mi).
