= Merișani =

- Commune
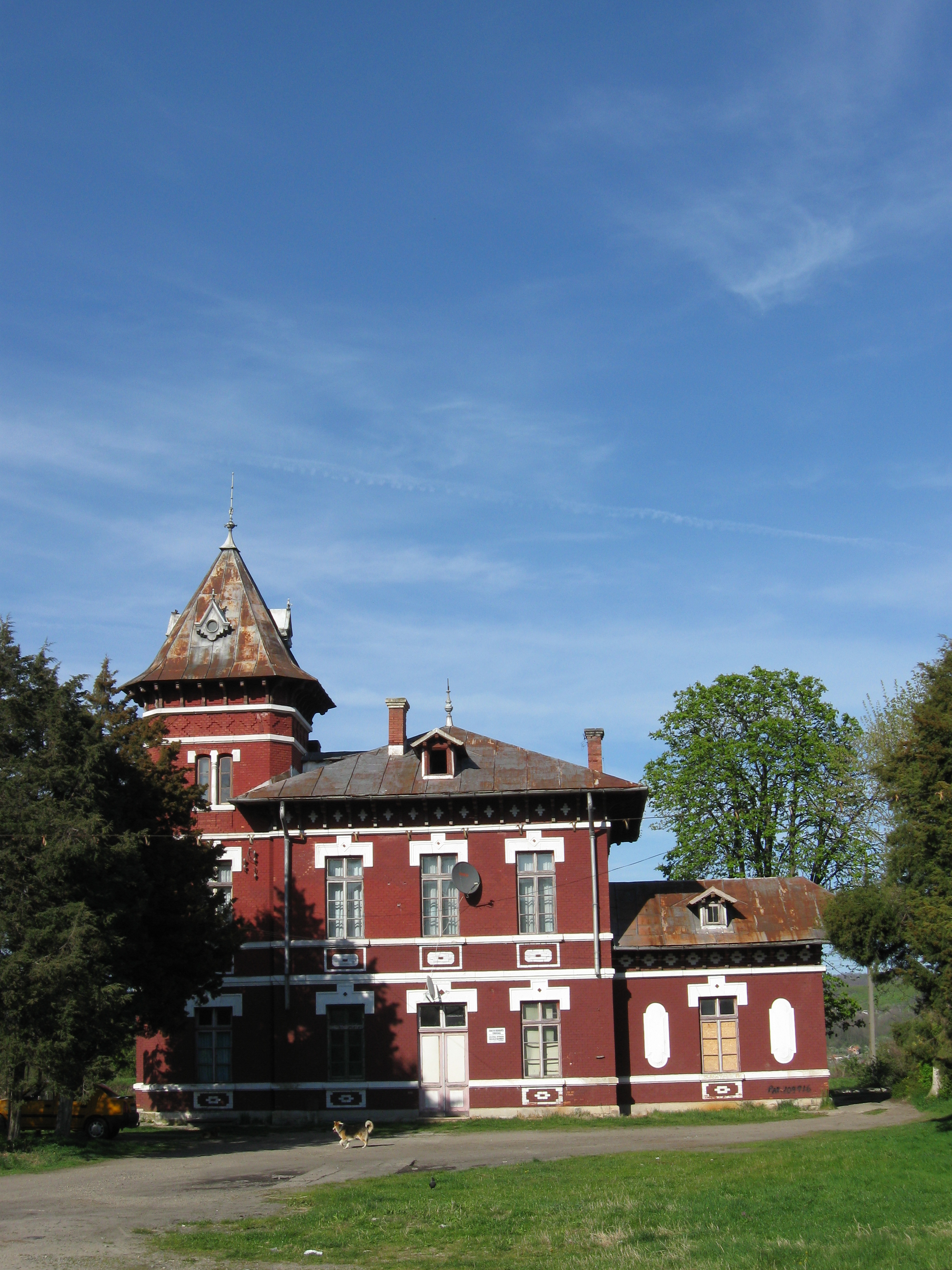
- The Romanian Railways station in Merișani, built 1898

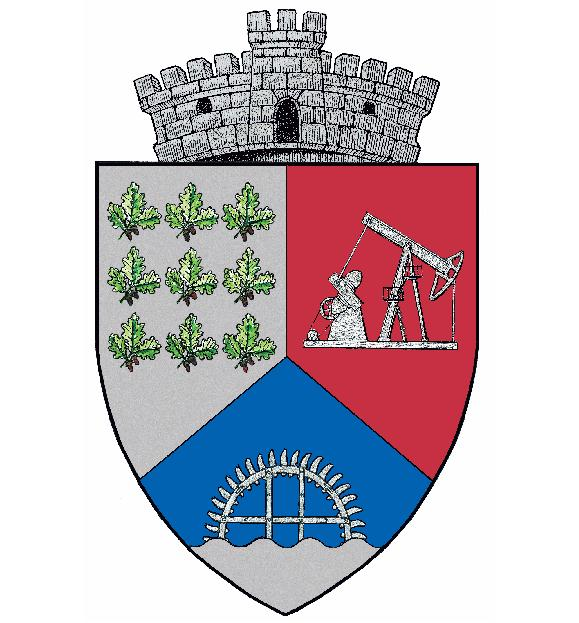
- Coat of arms

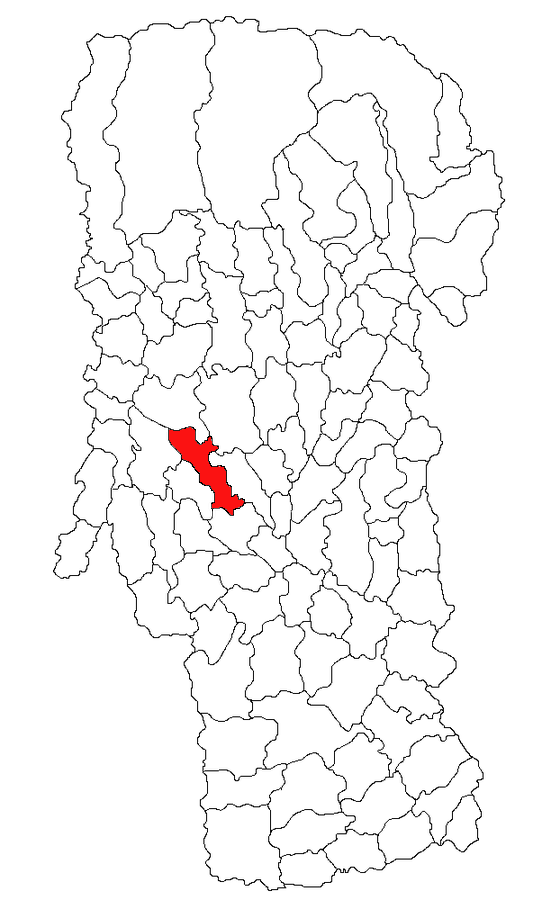
- Location in Argeș County

- Location in Romania
- Coordinates: 44°58′N 24°44′E
- Country: Romania
- County: Argeș

Government
  - Mayor (2020–2024): Marius-Luigi Ionescu (PSD)
- Area: 14.5 km^{2} (5.6 sq mi)
- Elevation: 388 m (1,273 ft)
- Population (2021-12-01): 4,510
  - Density: 311/km^{2} (806/sq mi)
- Time zone: UTC+02:00 (EET)
  - Summer (DST): UTC+03:00 (EEST)
- Postal code: 117455
- Area code: +(40) 248
- Vehicle reg.: AG
- Website: www.primaria-merisani.ro

Merișani is a commune in Argeș County, Muntenia, Romania. It is composed of nine villages: Borlești, Brăteasca, Capu Piscului, Crâmpotani, Dobrogostea, Malu Vânăt, Merișani, Vărzaru, and Vâlcelele.

== History ==
Humans have inhabited the area that now belongs to the commune since the Neolithic. In the Middle Ages, the oldest written evidence is from 1428. The church in Vărzaru village was built around 1620.

== Location ==
The commune is situated in the centre of Argeș County, at about 15 km (9.3 mi) from the county seat, Pitești, and 25 km (16 mi) to Curtea de Argeș.

== Geography ==
The commune is on the valley of the Argeș River, in a hilly region called Platforma Argeșului (the Argeș Platform), part of the Getic Plateau. The climate is temperate, with frequent rains. Winters are usually cold, with plenty of snow, while summers have a moderate heat.

== Demographics ==
The official data from the 2002 Census shows that the total population is of 4,428 persons. The majority are Romanians (4,252 or 96%). The second ethnic group are the Roma (171 or 4%). There are 5 people with other nationalities. However, the representants of the Romani community say that the Romani population is over 1,200 persons.

== Transportation ==
The main way to get to Merișani is by car. There are a national road and several county roads. The railway is the other access way, but trains are very rare.

== Economy ==
There are local resources, like oil, forests, and large lakes. There is also a camp that could help tourist development.

Merișani is considered, however, the poorest commune in the county.
