= Archdiocese of Argeș and Muscel =

Diocese of the Romanian Orthodox Church

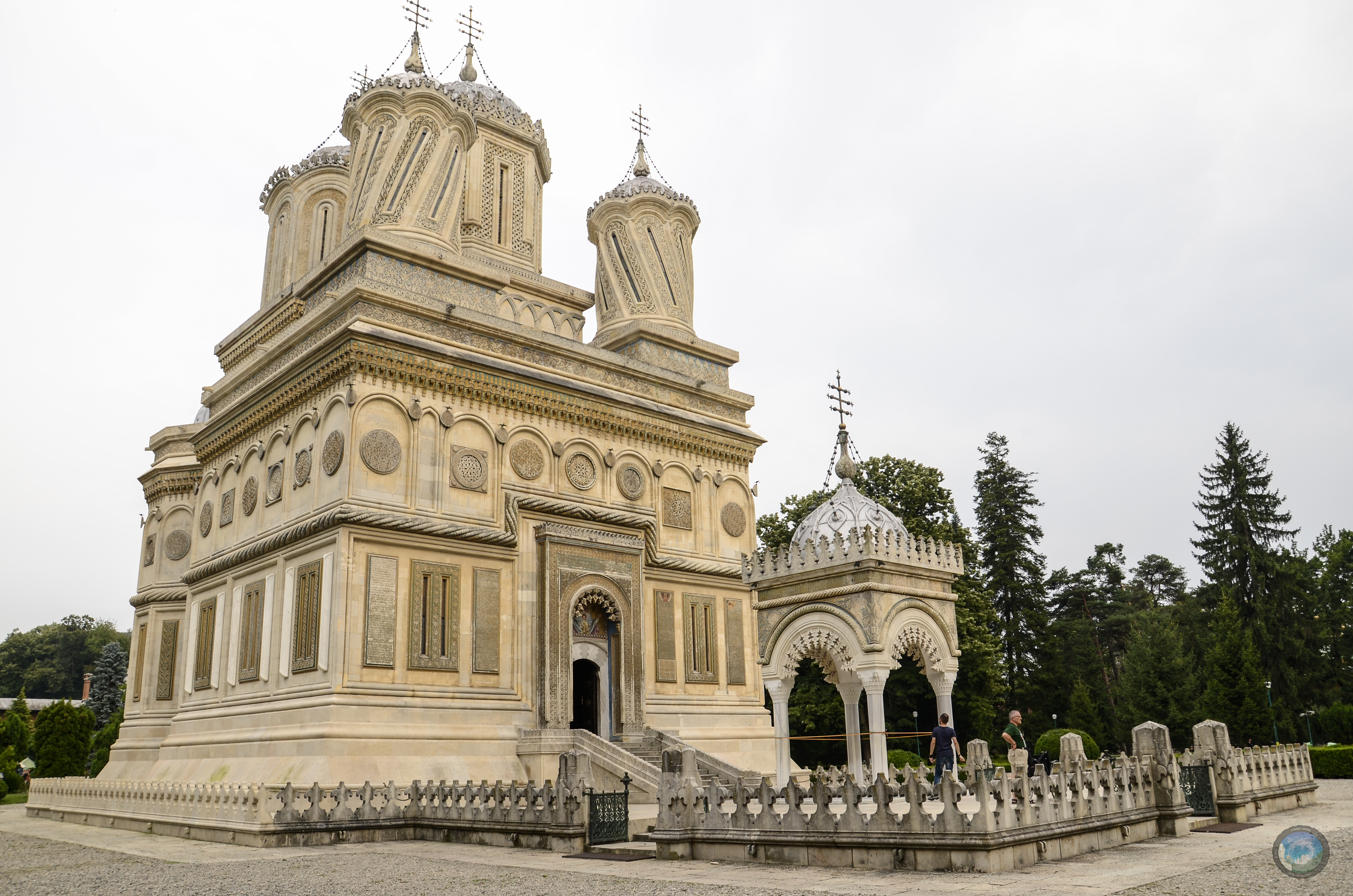
Cathedral of Curtea de Argeș, the seat of the Archdiocese of Argeș and Muscel

The Archdiocese of Argeș and Muscel (Romanian: Arhiepiscopia Argeșului și Muscelului) is a diocese of the Romanian Orthodox Church. Its see is the Dormition of the Theotokos Cathedral in Curtea de Argeș and its ecclesiastical territory covers Argeș County. The archdiocese forms part of the Metropolis of Muntenia and Dobrudja.

The institution traces its beginnings to the old Metropolis of Ungro-Wallachia, which moved to Târgoviște in 1517. A Diocese of Argeș was established in 1793, covering the counties of Argeș and Olt. Its most prominent bishop was probably the first, losif, who reigned until 1820; he translated and published numerous liturgical books. The diocese was disbanded in 1949, early in the communist regime, and merged into the Râmnic Diocese. It was revived in 1990, following the Romanian Revolution, and elevated to the rank of archdiocese in 2009.

== Bishops ==
The following men have served as bishop at Argeș since 1793:

Iosif (1793-1820)
Ilarion Gheorghiadis (1820-1823, 1828-1845)
Grigore Râmniceanul (1823-1828)
Samuil Tărtășescu Sinadon (1845-1849)
Climent Găiseanu (1850-1862)
Neofit Scriban (1862-1865, 1868-1873)
Ghenadie Țeposu (1865-1868)
Iosif Naniescu (1873-1875)
Ghenadie Petrescu (1875-1893)
Gherasim Timuș (1893-1911)

Calist Ialomițeanul (1912-1917)
Teofil Mihăilescu (July-November 1918)
Vartolomeu Stănescu (1919-1920)
Evghenie Humulescu (1920-1921, 1923)
Visarion Puiu (1921-1923)
Nichita Duma (1923-1936)
Grigorie Leu (1936-1940)
Emilian Antal (1941-1944)
Iosif Gafton (1944-1949)
Calinic Argatu (1990-)
