= Mălureni =

- Commune
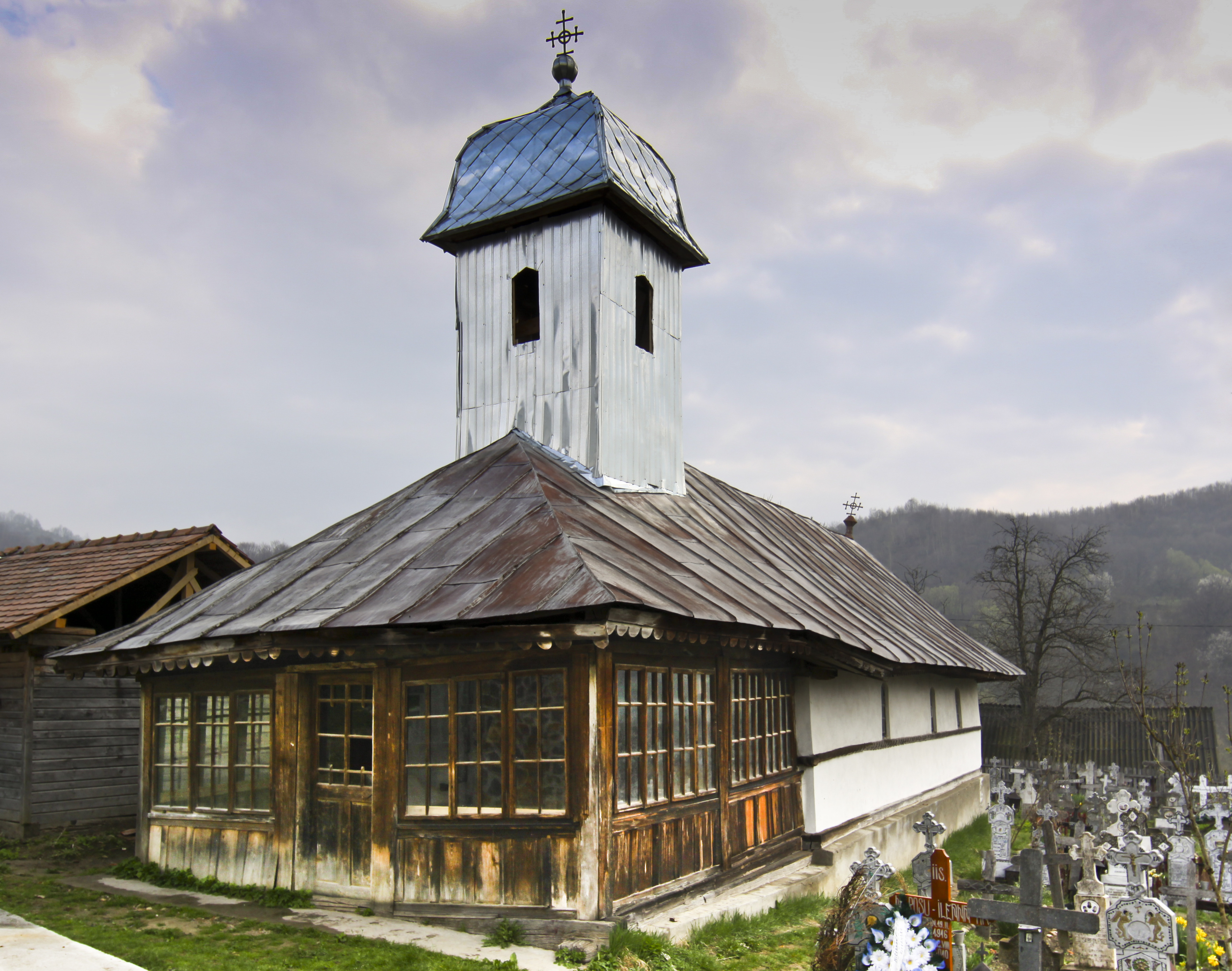
- Wooden church in Toplița

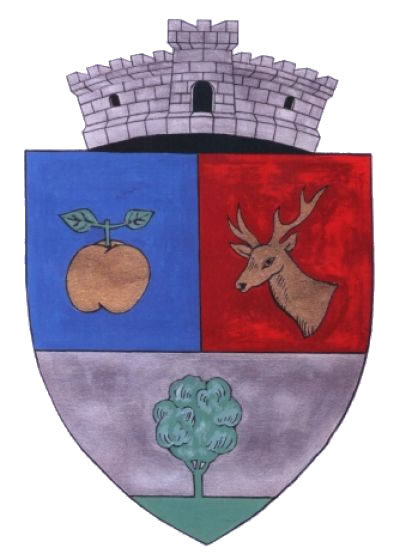
- Coat of arms

- Location in Romania
- Coordinates: 45°5′N 24°48′E
- Country: Romania
- County: Argeș

Government
  - Mayor (2020–2024): Florian Bucălie (PSD)
- Area: 107.04 km^{2} (41.33 sq mi)
- Elevation: 500 m (1,600 ft)
- Population (2021-12-01): 4,469
  - Density: 41.75/km^{2} (108.1/sq mi)
- Time zone: UTC+02:00 (EET)
  - Summer (DST): UTC+03:00 (EEST)
- Postal code: 117445
- Area code: +40 x48
- Vehicle reg.: AG
- Website: www.cjarges.ro/en/web/malureni

Mălureni is a commune in Argeș County, Muntenia, Romania. It is composed of five villages: Bunești, Mălureni, Păuleasca, Toplița, and Zărnești.
