= Mușătești =

- Commune
- Location in Romania
- Coordinates: 45.1889°N 24.7827°E
- Country: Romania
- County: Argeș
- Population (2021-12-01): 3,240
- Time zone: EET/EEST (UTC+2/+3)
- Vehicle reg.: AG

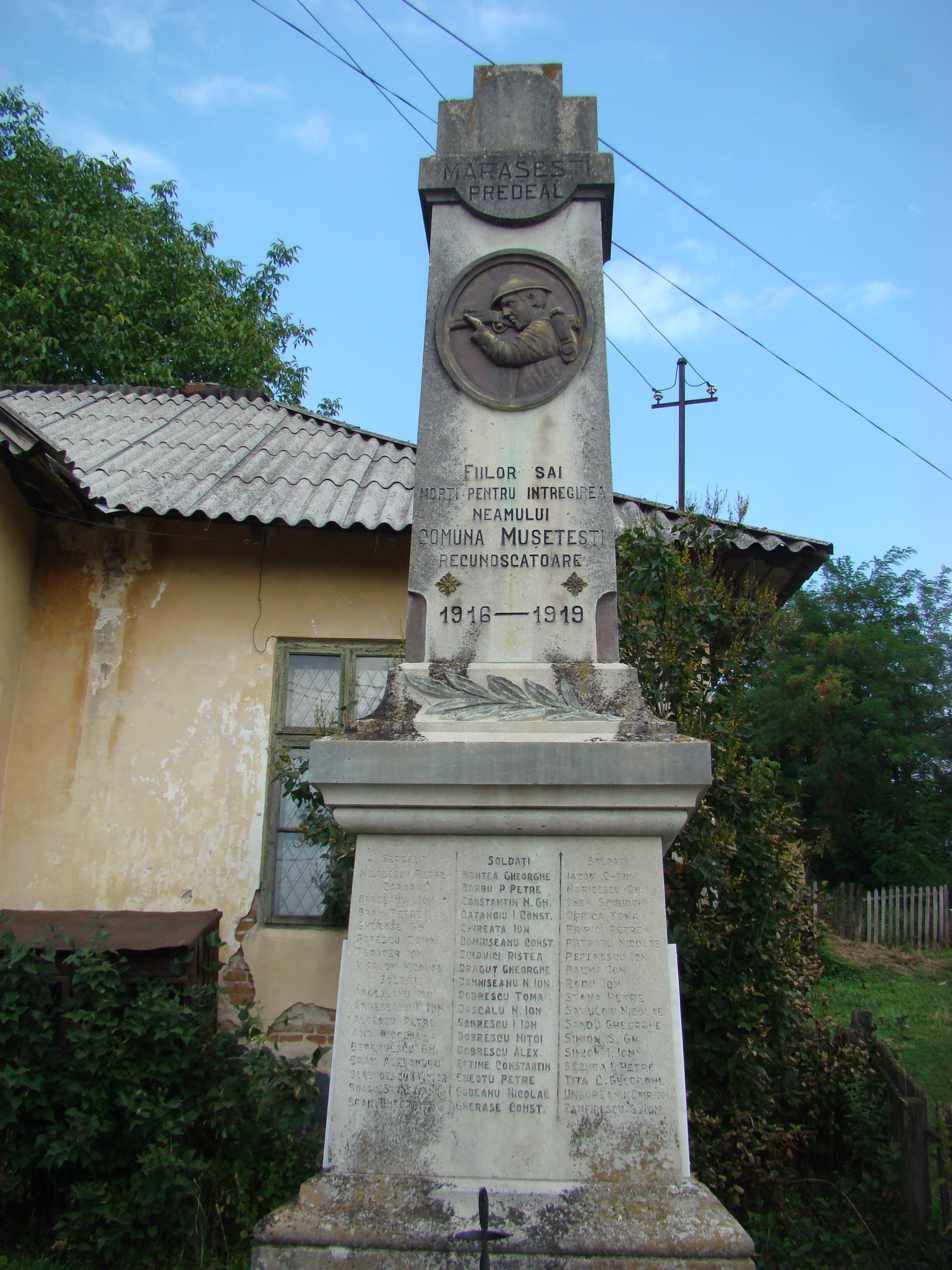

Mușătești is a commune in Argeș County, Muntenia, Romania. It is composed of nine villages: Bolovănești, Costești-Vâlsan, Mușătești, Prosia, Robaia, Stroești, Valea Faurului, Valea Muscelului and Vâlsănești.

== Natives ==
- Constantin Dobrescu-Argeș
