= Anton Bacalbașa =

Romanian writer and politician (1880–1899)

Anton C. Bacalbașa
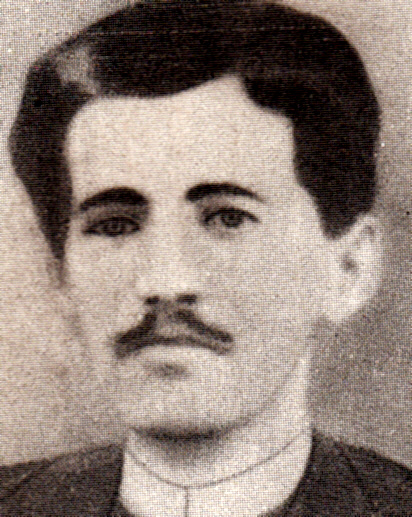
- Photograph of Bacalbașa, c. 1890
- Born: 21 February 1865; Brăila, Romanian United Principalities
- Died: 1 October 1899 (aged 34); Bucharest, Kingdom of Romania
- Resting place: Bellu Cemetery, Bucharest
- Occupations: humorist; opinion journalist; poet; politician
- Spouse: Alexandrina Scărișoreanu
- Writing career
- Pen name: Toni Bacalbașa; Tony Bacalbașa; Inot; Jus.; Rigolo; Wunderkind; Wus.; Zig.
- Period: c. 1881–1899
- Genres: satire; novella; parody; sketch story; memoir; epigram; revue
- Literary movement: Literatorul; Contemporanul

Anton Costache Bacalbașa (Romanian pronunciation: [anˈton kosˈtake bakalˈbaʃa], commonly known as Toni or Tony Bacalbașa, pen names Rigolo, Wunderkind, Inot, Jus., Wus., Zig. etc.; 21 February 1865 – 1 October 1899) was a Romanian political journalist, humorist and politician, chiefly remembered for his antimilitaristic series Moș Teacă. Together with his brothers Ioan and Constantin, he entered public life as a republican and socialist militant. For a while, his career was intertwined with that of Marxist doyen Constantin Dobrogeanu-Gherea, who inspired in him the idea of a socialist art addressed to the masses. He was himself a popularizer of Marxist ideas, and one of the first Marxist intellectuals in Romanian political history.

After 1893, Bacalbașa was at the center of Marxist politics, as an executive of the Romanian Social Democratic Workers' Party (PSDMR). While active within the socialist movement and making his essential contributions to Romanian humor, Toni joined Ion Luca Caragiale, his close friend, in editing the satirical magazine Moftul Român. He helped Constantin Mille to turn Adevărul daily into a socialist tribune, serving as its editor and directing its short-lived literary supplement (Adevărul Literar). His choice of subjects and his perceived harshness were the subject of several controversies, and, in 1894, he defended the Adevărul office building from rioting anti-socialist students. Over the following years, Bacalbașa drifted away from both Adevărul and the PSDMR, switching his allegiance to the political club formed around Nicolae Fleva.

At the time of his death, aged 34, Bacalbașa had served in the Assembly of Deputies as a representative of the Conservative Party. Despite this change in politics, he is mainly credited for his early contributions to Romanian literature, most of which reflect his critique of the political mainstream in the monarchical era. He created the stereotype of the cruel, violent and incompetent officer, and brought to public attention the hazing of young recruits.

== Biography ==
=== Early years ===
Bacalbașa was a native of Brăila, where his father Costache was serving as Police chief. The family traced its origins to Gorj County, changing their name from Telescu to Bacalbașa (literally, "head of the grocers") when one of them became leader of a guild in Galați. Costache had a military career in autonomous Wallachia, from 1834 to 1841, then settled in Brăila with his wife Aneta; they had thirteen children, seven of whom died before reaching maturity. According to literary historian George Călinescu, the exact date of Anton's birth is a mystery, but, judging by one of Toni's poems, may be 21 February 1865. Authors note that Toni was a passionate and extrovert person, but with a generally weak constitution. Born prematurely, he was reputedly an epileptic. In one of his later poems, Bacalbașa describes himself as unattractive, uncouth, "wax-faced, dead-eyed", and pessimistic.

The boy had difficulties completing his education. He attended school only up to the 8th grade, and, upon turning 17, volunteered for service in the Romanian Land Forces, where he became a Sergeant. He preserved a bittersweet record of his army service, reflected in both Moș Teacă and some memoirs of military life. According to his own account, he was insulted by a senior officer for not reporting to him concerning the suicide of one recruit; he avenged himself by punching his superior in front of the entire company. Bacalbașa faced a court-martial but, since the recruits refused to report him, was merely demoted.

After leaving the Land Forces, he moved to the capital, Bucharest, where he began associating with the left-liberal, Radical and socialist milieus. He was, by various accounts, a good public speaker, who knew how to address the workers, but who avoided issues of doctrine and made ample use of "mean gibes" against the politicians in power. Bacalbașa and his brothers became interested in socialist politics at a time when the local socialist movement was taking its first steps. In 1879, Constantin established a leftist magazine, called Drepturile Omului ("Human Rights").

The Romanian socialist clubs, which first held congress during that year, were still undecided about which school of thought should inspire their agenda: Marxism, Lassallism, Anarchism and Nihilism each had adherents in Romania. The proponents of a non-violent and liberal Marxism, as theorized political refugee Dobrogeanu-Gherea, eventually won the day, and the socialist clubs began constructing programs for a collectivist economy. Anton Bacalbașa had an essential contribution in this process. After 1881, he joined the Marxist group around Contemporanul magazine. His 1883 brochure, Capitalul, was the first ever introduction to, and summary of, Karl Marx's Das Kapital. Bacalbașa's literary ambitions were satisfied the same year. Some of his poems saw print in the magazine Literatorul, which was put out in Bucharest by writer Alexandru Macedonski.

Constantin Bacalbașa continued to take the initiative when it came to publicizing Gherea's cause. His 1883 magazine Emanciparea ("The Emancipation") made history for circulating portions of Jules Guesde's version of the "socialist catechism". As the years progressed, Anton himself joined in the effort: in 1887, he became the editorial director of Desrobirea (also translatable as "The Emancipation"), which advertised itself as a voice of the "working men party" (partidul lucrătorilor).

=== Democratic Radical, Sotir, Democrația Socială ===
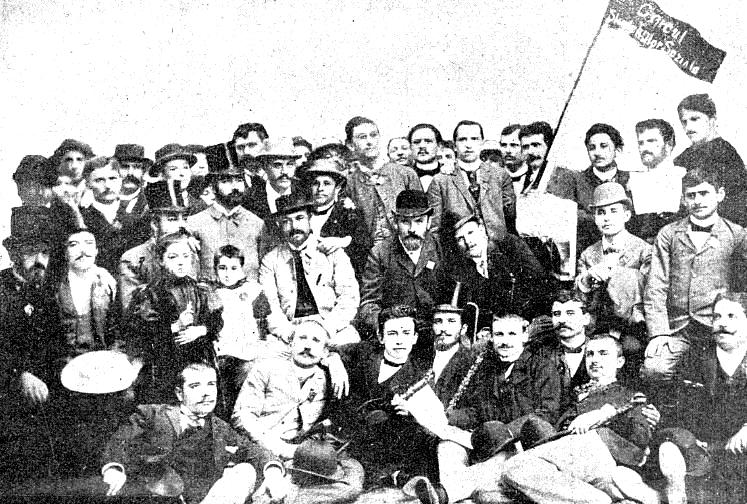
An 1892 gathering at Sotir, with Constantin Mille (holding his two daughters), Vasile Morțun and Constantin Dobrogeanu-Gherea seated in the foreground. Toni, in the white hat, is standing behind Morțun, holding him by the shoulder. Alexandru Ionescu and C. Z. Buzdugan are reclining in front of them. Also pictured, first from the left in the same row, is poet Artur Stavri. Simion Sanielevici, Henric Streitman, Henric Sanielevici, Ion Păun-Pincio are among those standing in the bottom row

Anton Bacalbașa ran for a seat in the Assembly of Deputies (Ilfov County, 3rd College), during the election of October 1888, picking up just 6 votes. By then, Dobrogeanu-Gherea and his pupils had caught negative attention from the governing Conservative Party, and especially from the Conservatives' political-literary faction, Junimea. In 1889, by means of the socialist press, Bacalbașa popularized the rumor that a Conservative-Junimist cabinet was working on expelling Gherea from the country. Gherea himself was alarmed by this, and requested an audience with Junimea leader and Education Minister Titu Maiorescu. Maiorescu reassured Gherea that his followers had no intention of sabotaging the socialist clubs in this disputable manner.

Around that time, Toni and his brothers became members of the Democratic Radical Party, a short-lived and eclectic liberal faction, whose founder and leader was the ex-Junimist George Panu. Constantin was afterward the publisher of Panu's political newspaper, Lupta. Panu and his men tried to negotiate an alliance against the National Liberal Party (PNL), which had for long been the nominal leftist side of Romania's two-party system. Their program included a promise that the outgoing PNL Prime Minister, Ion Brătianu, would be made to face trial. The PNL's George D. Pallade reported with sarcasm that Panu's promise to fight corruption "with the Bacalbașas" could only bring his party votes from "the naive".

Both Toni and Constantin were press delegates to the 1890 Congress of Students in Botoșani, a major affair which involved both Conservatives and socialists. In June 1891, "Bacalbașa Anton" was also announced as one of the leading contributors to the literary magazine Ecoul Sĕptĕmânii ("The Weekly Echo"), alongside a gathering of journalists and social activists: Traian Demetrescu, Saniel Grossman, Gheorghe "din Moldova" Kernbach, Dumitru Teleor, Maica Smara, Berman Goldner-Giordano etc. Also joining them were draftsmen Nicolae Vermont and Constantin Jiquidi.

Toni was later inducted into the Marxist club formed by Constantin Mille at Sotir Hall, Bucharest, and lectured for the public on a weekly basis. Author Constantin Kirițescu, who joined the Sotir group as a 17-year-old, recalls that both men "carried the brunt" of organizing and educating the socialist sympathizers. According to journalist I. Felea, Toni, who "resembled Ferdinand Lassalle in looks and speech", was a favorite of the Bucharest workers, and made an impression on them by touching the issue of penniless senior citizens. Bacalbașa himself did not have a stable domicile, and slept on the tables at Sotir. By 1893, Kirițescu notes, the task of representing "Marxist orthodoxy" had fallen on a new arrival, Ioan Nădejde; the "occult leader" Dobrogeanu-Gherea, already "an invalid", was rarely visiting the club, and was losing support among the rank and file. Two other figures, Alexandru Ionescu and Alexandru Georgescu, represented the working class on the Sotir presidium, but they were both in the process of becoming prosperous businessmen.

Beginning in early 1892, Toni centered his activity on the industrial hub of Ploiești, where he became managing editor of Democrația Socială ("Social Democracy"). The weekly paper was financed by a lawyer and entrepreneur, Alexandru Radovici, and was originally apolitical, but moved to the left once Bacalbașa took over. He himself lived for a while in the city, and, like Radovici, sat on the Ploiești Workers' Club Executive Committee. Democrația Socială became a rather important voice for the socialist movement, receiving collaborations from Gherea, Demetrescu, Mille, I. Nădejde, Sofia Nădejde, O. Carp and George Diamandy. According to historian Paul D. Popescu, the editorial opinion was divisible into three factions: Gherea was the evolutionary socialist, Radovici the liberal democrat; Toni, who made a lasting impression among the readers, represented the far left, prophesying the dictatorship of the proletariat.

Around that date, Anton Bacalbașa endorsed didactic art, as envisaged by Gherea. The socialists were unnerved by Conservative theorists, who countered with the principle of art for art's sake. Initially, this was a direct dispute with Junimea and Maiorescu. Cultural historian Z. Ornea thus notes that, while Dobrogeanu-Gherea kept silent, his young pupils launched "a veritable anti-Junimist campaign"; among those he lists in this category are Bacalbașa, Demetrescu, S. Nădejde and Garabet Ibrăileanu, along with Dimitrie Anghel, Emil Fagure, Raicu Ionescu-Rion, Henric Sanielevici, Constantin Stere and Avram Steuerman-Rodion. At Democrația Socială, Toni wrote in favor of a workers' art, inspired by the sheer realities of industrial life, and published, in addition to his own short prose, fragments from various socially minded authors—Mór Jókai, Guy de Maupassant, Mircea Rosetti, Ivan Turgenev, Émile Zola etc.

=== Moftul Român ===
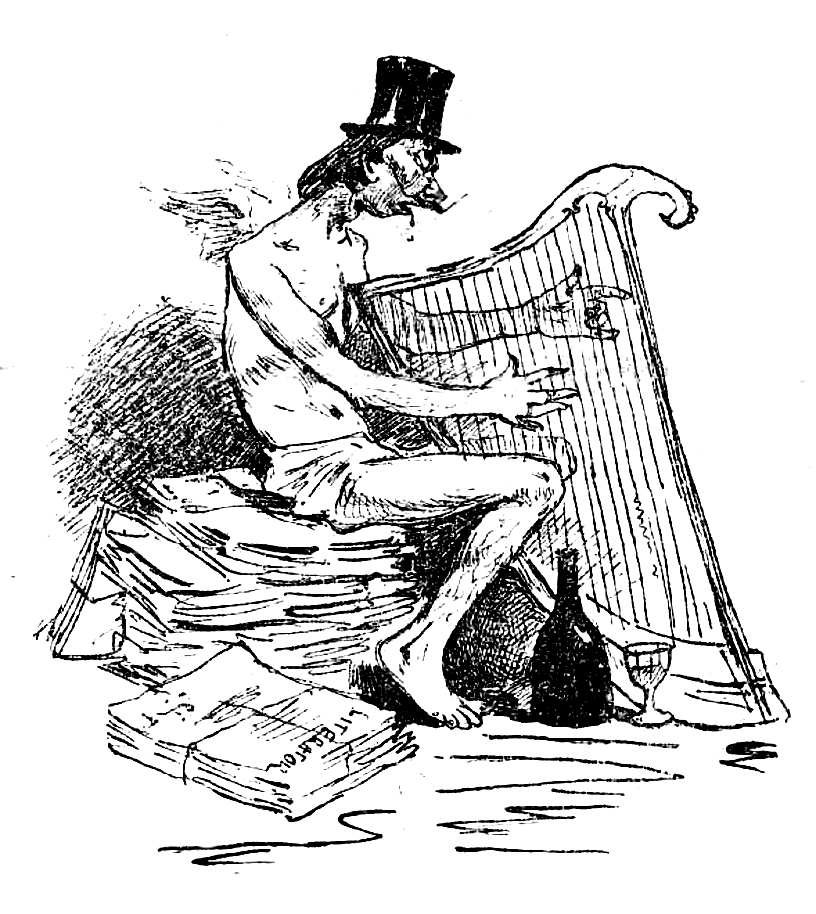
"The Symbolist poet", as portrayed by Moftul Român cartoonist Constantin Jiquidi

The busiest part of Toni Bacalbașa's short career covers the years 1893–1894. He had by then befriended the influential satirist Caragiale, and, with him, began work on the humorous gazette Moftul Român. The two authors had different backgrounds: to Bacalbașa's socialism, Caragiale opposed a conservatism formed during his stay with Junimea. Literary historian Tudor Vianu notes that, in a cheerful manner, Moftul reflected that Junimist agenda, skeptical toward all cultural innovation. According to philologist Ștefan Cazimir, the magazine was mainly a parody of the neoromantic and modern kitsch, prevalent in the fin de siècle. Its title translates into "The Romanian Trifle" or "The Romanian Nonsense", referencing one's uppity answer to things presented as new: moft! (in the same sense of "bollocks!"). Moftul editorials had it that moft! was a national characteristic, what "spleen" is to the English, "chauvinism" to the Hungarians, and "Nihilism" to the Russians.

Caragiale's paper was in large part poking fun at the nationalist and traditionalist current in Romanian literature, parodying stories about peasant life. A predilect victim was the nationalist scholar and Caragiale critic Bogdan Petriceicu Hasdeu, his life's work of gathering etymological data ridiculed as "the Magnum Mophtologicum". Also featured were Caragiale's first jibes against the Symbolist movement, including lampoons of Bacalbașa's former patron, Alexandru Macedonski. Lastly, Moftul Român taunted some Junimist colleagues, including Maiorescu—whom it depicted as a libertine and a seducer of schoolgirls.

According to one account, Caragiale himself visited Sotir, where he lectured about the causes and consequences of human stupidity. Moftul Român did host the occasional socialist article, including an unsigned tribute to May Day, most likely written by Bacalbașa himself. The pieces were many times anonymous, and it is occasionally difficult for researchers to distinguish between Caragiale and Bacalbașa's articles. According to Caragiale expert Șerban Cioculescu, the differences are mostly in style and orthographic preference: Caragiale still used the antiquated Romanian letters ĕ and ê, while Toni had updated his writing to the latest norms.

In parallel, Toni completed the first collection of Moș Teacă stories, printed in Bucharest with the subtitle Din cazarmă ("From the Boot Camp"). Addressing an ethnic Romanian readership in Transylvania and other parts of Austria-Hungary, the cultural journal Familia introduced Bacalbașa as an active participant to "the discussion on art", and reported that the book "enjoyed an unusually great success" in a Romanian context.

=== PSDMR and Adevărul Literar campaigns ===
After prolonged debates and negotiations, the various socialist assemblies fused with each other, creating, in March 1893, the PSDMR. It has been described as Romania's "first nation-wide working-class party", and called itself "the vanguard of socialism" in Romania. Toni Bacalbașa was not delegated by Bucharest to represent the Sotir circle at the original PSDMR Congress, and Moftul Român published a piece attacking Nădejde for having organized that meeting behind closed doors. He may still have been present at that reunion, representing another club. Toni was also a noted guest at the Sotir meeting acknowledging the party's establishment, addressing a packed hall.

His political role was recognized by his peers, who nominated him for the Commission drafting the party program, then elected him on the party's governing body (the General Council). Bacalbașa was one of the six people elected by the congress into a ten-member delegation to the Second International's Zurich Congress, but was replaced at the last minute. Meanwhile, superseded by the PSDMR's own press (Lumea Nouă, Munca), Democrația Socială closed down. Also in 1893, Constantin Mille took over leadership of the republican daily Adevărul, making it the informal PSDMR platform. Toni was appointed as one of the paper's editors, and authored what is probably the first-ever interview in Romanian media history. The other Bacalbașas were also enlisted by Adevărul: Constantin was one of the main editors; Ioan was famous as the gossip columnist (and infamous for never using commas).

As noted by journalist Ilie Ighel in Familia, there was a swift transition from republicanism to socialism, effected when some of the old staff left Adevărul. He wrote: "[instead,] a sinister character emerges, in the person of Anton Bacalbașa, the graduate of two gymnasium classes, along with other unknown celebrities [...]. It is certain that such transitions from one stance to the other have disgusted the cultured public, giving birth to a deep resentment for this sheet that, once taken over by Anton Bacalbașa, did not embrace scientific socialism, [...] but proceeded to insult with brutality all those things that are notable in industry, commerce, finance". In retrospect, Constantin Bacalbașa also admitted that the socialist takeover was made possible because Alexandru Beldiman, the newspaper's owner, was "weak-willed".

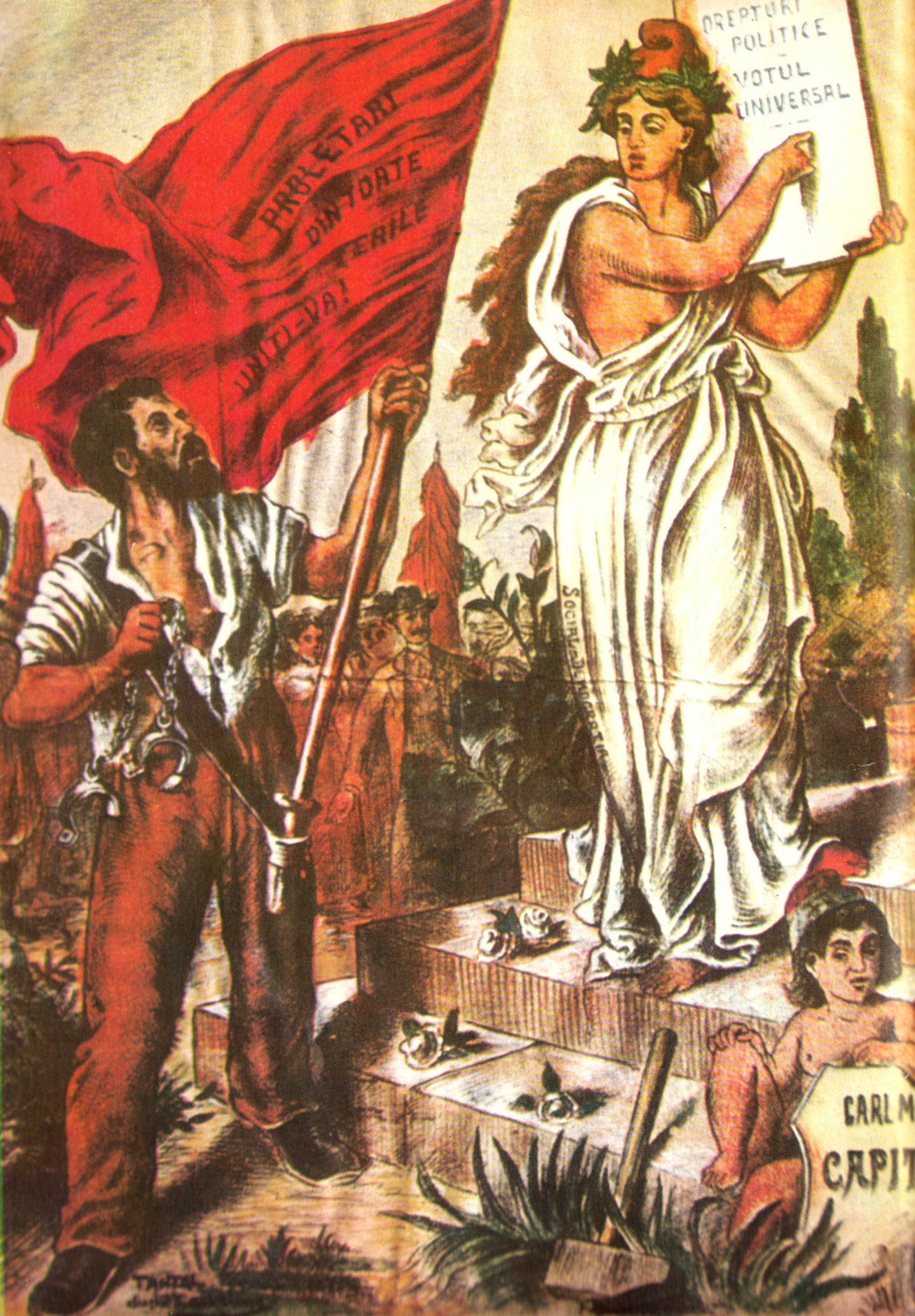
PSDMR propaganda in the magazine Lumea Nouă, 1895. The female figure represents social democracy, and the red flag is marked Proletarians of all countries, unite!

Toni was a noisy presence at Adevărul, and for this reason did not get along with Beldiman. According to one account, he and Beldiman got into a war of nerves, interrupting each other's activities with the sound of bells—moving from standard handbells to heavy cowbells. Toni was later assigned to lead the Adevărul Literar cultural supplement, which gave him the opportunity to engage in major debates over literary theory. Călinescu describes enterprise as reflecting "the socialist spirit". When Caragiale lost his position as a civil servant and fell back on money earned with his restaurant, Toni attempted to stir an anti-government reaction among the general public. His publicity stunt, taken up by Adevărul Literar, was a faux obituary, announcing that, if stripped of a salary, Caragiale was (as good as) dead.

Several sources note that Bacalbașa was a harsh reviewer of literary works, who made sure to point out the flaws of literary debutantes. In the end, Adevărul Literar received contributions from, among others, Demetrescu, Constantin Stere (with the pen name Un observator ipohondru, "A Hypochondriac Observer"), H. Sanielevici, Simion Sanielevici, Ion Gorun and Artur Stavri. Also featured, on his debut, was the aspiring humorist George Ranetti, who received the signature Namuna, and who referred to Bacalbașa as "my literary godfather".

Bacalbașa's efforts were again mainly dedicated to the promotion of didactic art. The main cultural battle was no longer carried between the PSDMR and Junimea, but between the socialist and non-socialist advocates of didacticism. Adevărul Literar directed its passion against author Alexandru Vlahuță and his journal Vieața, whose pro-didactic agenda was more right-wing than Mille's. Vlahuță was already outraged by Caragiale's unsigned parodies in Moftul, calling them the work of "some stupid parvenu". His conflict with the Gherea socialists was, according to Călinescu, rather pointless, since Bacalbașa is "only apparently an adversary of Vlahuță's". The debate nevertheless grew into a mutual animosity. In one of his letters, Vlahuță feigns shock at the discovery that Toni has judged him to be "talentless".

The dispute over such issues grew more heated as others joined in. According to Kirițescu, Toni's debate with Doctor Alceu Urechia, an anti-didacticist, degenerated into "a suburbanite airing of dirty laundry"; while Cosco writes that their quarrel was "a waste of humor". When Gherea was challenged from the left by a pseudonymous author, I. Saint Pierre, Bacalbașa and his journal reacted with vehemence, debating over this issue with Steuerman-Rodion, a more moderate socialist chronicler. Yet another target for Toni's criticism was the old historian and novelist Bogdan Petriceicu Hasdeu, who, still grieving for his daughter Iulia, allowed himself to be entirely absorbed into the polemic. Bacalbașa was widely credited as the winner of this collateral dispute, and even Hasdeu was pleasantly surprised by his talents, recommending him as Romania's only genuine journalist.

Toni's socialist disciples prolonged the scandal, publishing an offshoot of Moftul, entirely dedicated to satirizing the anti-PSDMR coalition, and titled Putregaiul Român ("The Romanian Rot"). Bacalbașa's political and artistic preoccupations formed the basis for three new books, all printed in 1894. One was dedicated to, and named after, his conference on the topic of "art for art's sake" (Artă pentru artă). Another one was a social pamphlet, Bătaia în armată ("Beatings in the Army"). The third was a selection of novellas, Din viața militară ("From the Military Life"). Also in 1894, Toni and Radovici made new visits to Ploiești, where they recruited members for the socialist movement.

=== 1894 scandals ===
Together with Mille and other Adevărul socialists, Toni was openly courting the much larger PNL. In early 1894, he wrote an Adevărul piece, calling on the PNL to move further to the left, by "openly embracing the democratic ideals." The offer of a liberal-socialist alliance was announced by the PSDMR's own program, but ignored by the PNL; as a result of this attitude, the PSDMR's Diamandy even suggested an alliance with the governing Conservatives. Bacalbașa, Mille and Beldiman were all present at a January 1894 conference, which aimed to coalesce the left into a pressure group for universal suffrage. It reached out to the Radicals and liberal democrats at Românul and Evenimentul newspapers, and then to independent agrarian activists (Vasile Kogălniceanu, Constantin Dobrescu-Argeș), but, a few months later, broke down into competing factions. On 24 January, Toni published in Adevărul a fairy-tale-like lampoon directed at the Romanian King Carol I of Romania and at his designated successor Ferdinand, caricatured as the "avaricious" emperor and the repulsive Urechilă ("Floppy Ears").

A serious scandal erupted in June 1894, when the socialists found themselves targeted by nationalist students mobs, who objected to the PSDMR's alleged snubbing of the Romanians of Transylvania. The demonstrations soon degenerated into an attack on private institutions, including the Adevărul headquarters. According to the hostile account of Ilie Ighel, this was the public's way of punishing Bacalbașa's proletarian internationalism. Familia also reported that the students had originally asked Bacalbașa to tone down his agenda, to which he allegedly replied: "Get out, you dastards!" Reportedly, the rioters were violently dispersed by the Adevărul typographers. The Police intervened in the squabble, and placed the Adevărul building under armed guard. Arrest warrants were issued for the Adevărul staff: Mille and Alexandru Ionescu were taken into custody and released a short while after, whereas Bacalbașa absconded.

Mille's group found a friend in Constantin Stere, by then a maverick member of the PNL, who began maneuvering against the PNL's right-wing from the inside. Managing a literary sheet put out by the pro-PNL Evenimentul, Stere supported Adevărul in its campaign for literary didacticism, and organized rallies of solidarity with the Bucharest socialists. This happened just as Toni was publishing satirical pieces targeting Evenimentul owner George A. Scorțescu, which left Stere in an awkward position. Stere was consequently accused by Evenimentul of being a spy and a tool for the Conservatives. The incidents were reviewed with caution by Adevărul, whose panelists feared that a Conservative conspiracy was in the making, but Toni also criticized the PNL papers for suggesting the same.

When Stere challenged Scorțescu to a duel, Bacalbașa covered the affair for Adevărul. Although he condemned Scorțescu's editorial policy, Toni advised Stere to withdraw his demand for satisfaction, or else "all the crooks and vermin will only have to learn how to duel and that's how the press will be banned from taking a stand." In his column of 1 October, when he discussed the Conservatives' decision to expel all "trouble-making" students, he admitted that the complications of the affair surpassed his power of understanding: "I could not say [who is right] anymore, there's a sort of black confusion in my mind".

The friendship between Bacalbașa and Mille had soured over those months, and Toni soon left Adevărul for good. It is possible that this rift occurred because of Beldiman, who ceded his stock to Mille without even considering Bacalbașa for a successor. The issue was of interest to the entire socialist movement, since Adevărul vied for attention with the same niche of the working public. One of Stere's colleagues, the socialist N. Quinezu, denounced Anton Bacalbașa for being in a conflict of interest, for holding a PSDMR office while still working at Adevărul, and for vetoing funds for the PSDMR sheet Lumea Nouă. On 25 September 1894, Bacalbașa presented his resignation from the PSDMR Council. He also reconciled with Familia, where he published his sketch story La garda pieții ("Guarding the Marketplace", December 1894). Adevărul Literar went out of business on 13 February 1895, and Mille found himself expelled from the PSDMR after the Third Party Congress of April.

During that year, Toni was still active in the party, writing for Lumea Nouă and upholding Gherea's political line. His articles touched a sensitive subject: the Law on Mining, passed by the Junimist Prime Minister Petre P. Carp, which did away with the PNL's protectionism and greatly increased foreign investment in the Romanian economy. The PSDMR, committed to the Marxist theory on the relations of production, supported the law as a step forward into capitalism, but also criticized it for not allowing a state monopoly on mines. Also that year, Bacalbașa dueled with a certain Bogdanovici, having Caragiale as his witness. The event is remembered in literature because Caragiale, using his trademark black humor, called on the duelers to fire their pistols from a distance of ten paces.

=== Conservative politics and death ===
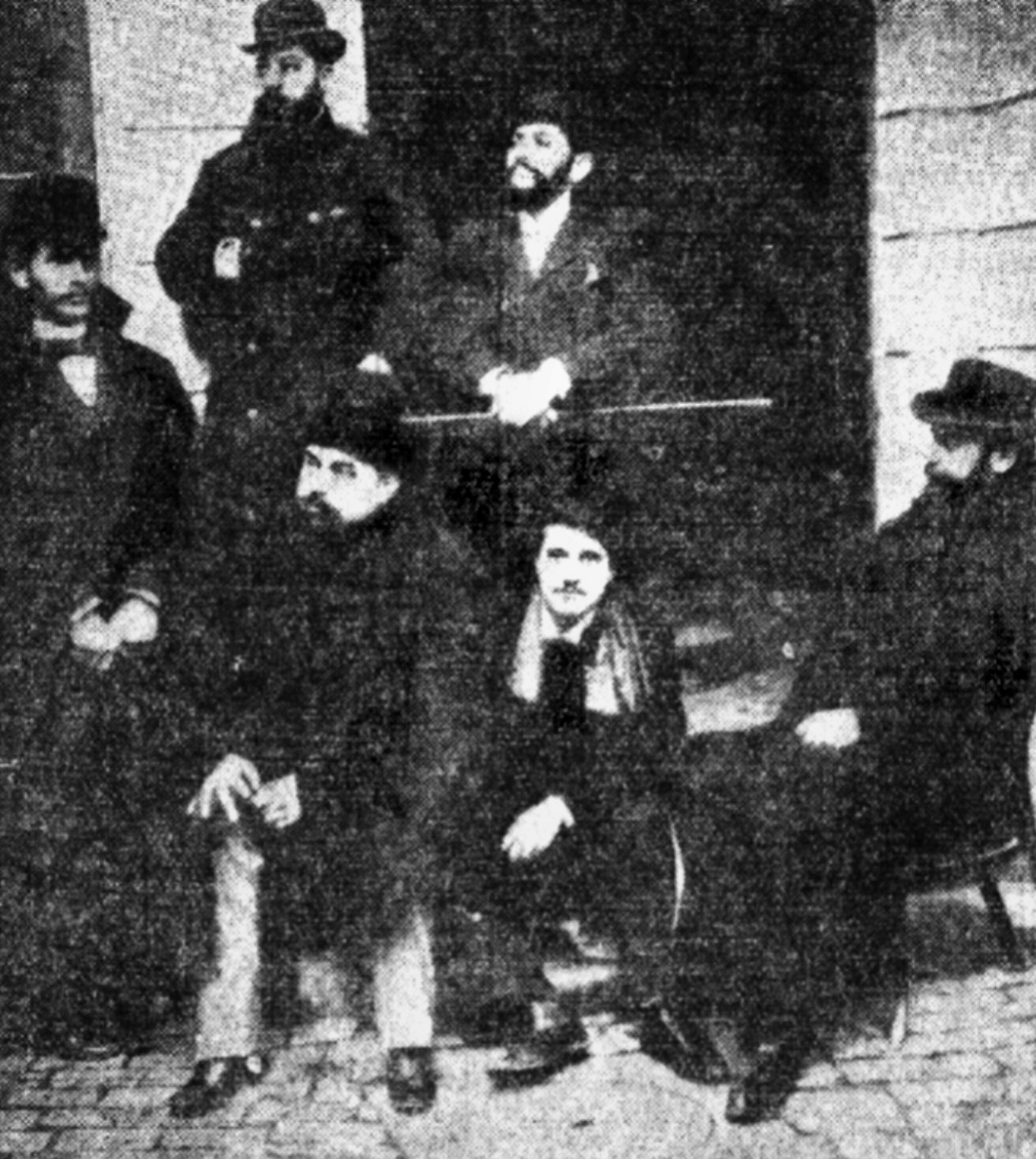
Constantin Mille (first seated, from left) and the other members of Adevărul's editorial staff in 1897, after Toni's departure. Ioan and Constantin Bacalbașa stand directly behind Mille

Eventually, Bacalbașa formalized his split with the socialist party. From 1896, both he and his rival Scorțescu were members of a PNL splinter group, presided upon by lawyer Nicolae Fleva. He served the "Flevist" cause as a writer for Dreptatea daily, then as a public speaker, organizing rallies at Dacia Hall and agitating the public for the reinstatement of Ghenadie Petrescu as Metropolitan-Primate. All three Bacalbașas, together with Fleva and the Lumea Nouă socialists (represented by A. Ionescu), also protested when PNL Prime Minister Dimitrie Sturdza expelled Aromanian refugees for having questioned his Balkans policy. Soon, Toni embarked on an additional venture, creating a satirical magazine named after (and featuring stories with) Moș Teacă. In its first series, the periodical hosted a lampoon piece by the young leftist writer Gala Galaction and Toni's own satirical portrait of Caragiale as a political opportunist, gravitating between the Junimists and George Panu's Radicals.

The journalist settled down to a family life, marrying Alexandrina Scărișoreanu (who was ten years his younger). He also accepted an offer from Transylvania's Vatra magazine (co-edited by Caragiale) to set up its satirical supplement Hazul ("Fun"), but the venture failed to interest the public and was abandoned. On 22 March 1898, Bacalbașa began reissuing Moș Teacă, introduced as Jurnal Țivil și Cazon ("Civilian and Military Newspaper"). One of its preferred targets was Mille, referred to in the paper as Millu Crocodilu ("Mill[e] the Crocodile"). The co-author of such material was Ranetti-Namuna, who arrived there after a stint at Lupta.

During 1899, Bacalbașa followed Fleva's group as it merged into the Conservative Party. His presence alongside Maiorescu was recorded with displeasure by the Junimist Ioan Slavici, as one of the reasons why Conservative politics had become ineffectual. A Conservative cabinet was called to power, with Fleva as the Agriculture Minister, and Bacalbașa ran in the general election of 1899, earning an Ilfov County seat in the Assembly of Deputies. Toni still pursued his literary interests: together with "Constantin Ivan" (the common pseudonym of his two brothers), he wrote the 3-act political revue Pardon!.

This was to be his last known endeavor: on 1 October 1899, having contracted bacterial pneumonia, Bacalbașa died, and was buried at Bellu Cemetery. Public mourning was taken up by both Fleva and Caragiale. According to the former: "Through every sort of trouble, through every storm I ever had to cross into, I felt strong knowing that Anton Bacalbașa was with me. It is to his talent, his heart and his friendship that I owe the best years of my public life." The same year, the PSDMR itself disappeared from the scene: Ioan Nădejde and his "generous ones" faction denounced socialist politics as too feeble for the Romanian context, and joined the PNL, leaving a minority, under C. Z. Buzdugan, I. C. Frimu and Christian Rakovsky, to establish a more radical workers' party (embryo of the post-1910 Social Democratic Party).

== Literary work ==
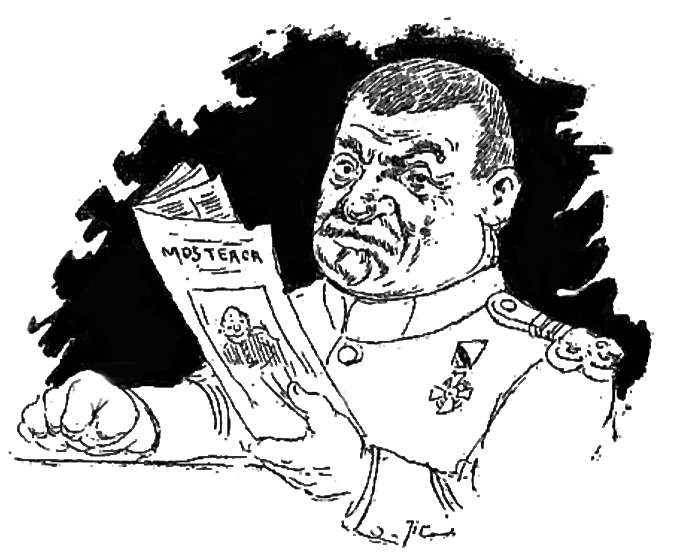
Moș Teacă reading about himself in the eponymous magazine—caricature by Constantin Jiquidi, February 1896

During his 1890s polemics, Anton Bacalbașa explained at length what his vision of didacticism meant. His stated belief was that: "In all of our works, that which is alive first and foremost is ourselves." Nevertheless, George Călinescu writes, Toni "was far from pouring socialism over everything", and believed that poetry in particular should be apolitical. As early as 1894, Avram Steuerman-Rodion noted that the Adevărul Literar editor had been straying away from Dobrogeanu-Gherea's didactic path.

Moș Teacă, which endures as Bacalbașa's best liked series, is a tragicomic account of military life. The eponymous hero is a grotesque Army Captain, who is comically illiterate but savage in his treatment of the recruits. The reader never learns his actual name, but only his nickname, literally "Old Man Scabbard", but also rendered as "Captain Scabbard" (Bacalbașa hints that derogatory nicknames were commonly used by the recruits when referring to their unpopular superiors). It is generally held that Toni's anti-hero is in large part inspired by a standard of French literature, in particular by Charles Leroy's Col. Ramollot and Henry Monnier's Joseph Prudhomme. This interpretation is nuanced by researcher Constantin Ciopraga, who argues: "As a former army volunteer, the future journalist Bacalbașa did not need the French model proposed by Charles Leroy in Le Colonel Ramollot; he was directly familiarized with the Prussian spirit of yesteryear."

Moș Teacă has lived all his life in the army, having been a drummer boy by vocation. His obtuse nature greatly disturbs his understanding of civilian affairs: when he is informed that the Dâmbovița River has swelled, he asks, "Who gave the order for this?" He provides his men with incomprehensible advice on how to march, instructs them how to make a polite retreat if the enemy catches them without a weapon, and, while on maneuvers on the Prut River, orders them to combat the epizootic with a verbal inspection of the cattle.

Teacă and the other infantry officers are especially violent toward the recruits, and use a wide inventory of corporal punishments, on an advancing scale. In addition to hitting the young soldiers (with their bare knuckles, with sword belts, or with sticks), they force some to run around for hours with a "bitch" (the regimental Maxim gun) on their back, or to hold aim while staring directly into the sun. In La garda pieții, the soldiers react badly to injustice and stage a protest, but their effort is ultimately wasted by intrigues. Other categories of servicemen are also touched by Bacalbașa's wit. His stories show military medicine as a grim spectacle: the physicians are either criminally incompetent or sadistic, driving recruits to the brink of suicide. The elite cavalry (Roșiori) show particular restraint in public, but are merciless in dealing with their young subordinates.

Army men were generally irritated by Bacalbașa's comedy. Some ten years after the author's death, General Brătianu commented that Moș Teacă was the stuff of imagination, and propaganda "for the naive". Toni himself probably intended to make Teacă reach beyond the topic of antimilitarism. As he explained, Teacă might just as well be active in environments other than the boot camp, from the marketplace to the Senate of Romania. In order to ridicule his colleagues in the media, Bacalbașa created an alternative character, the self-seeking newspaperman Spanachidi (said to have been based on a real-life model).

Bacalbașa's other humorous works are scattered. Călinescu describes him as a restless "buffoon" and "an unpretentious journalist", but acknowledges that his French wit and verve have raised the level of Romania's media. Toni's parodies of Symbolism, published in Moftul Român, are described by Cioculescu as even better than those signed by Caragiale, since they hit closer to "the mark". Many of his other written contributions are homographic one-line jokes, or samples of absurd humor in the épater la bourgeoisie tradition, while his memoirs record the involuntarily humorous rhyming of a poet-soldier. Călinescu finds them amusing but, in large part, copied from the French prankster Alfred Jarry ("the technique of Ubuesque humorists"). Both Anton and Constantin Bacalbașa were also early pioneers of the Romanian epigram genre, which the former helped popularize at Moftul.

Some of Bacalbașa's writings are of a more restrained nature, and even include somber pieces. A younger colleague, C. Cosco, recalled: "We [journalists] knew that, under his ferocious sarcasm, under his biting wit, he was hiding the sentimentality of a German maiden." In his more serious poems, Toni follows the model set by Junimea's Mihai Eminescu. In a controversial article he wrote in 1890, Toni asserted that Eminescu was a unique genius, who did not fit in with any school of literature.

== Legacy ==
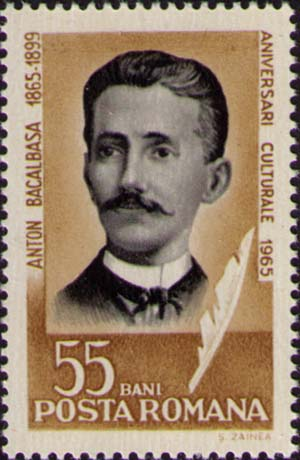
Anton Bacalbașa on a 1965 Romanian stamp

Following Toni's death, Alexandrina Bacalbașa remarried, to the Transylvanian literato Nerva Hodoș. She survived her second husband by several decades. When she died, in 1954, she was buried next to her first husband.

A final Moș Teacă almanac was put out in 1900, featuring the sketch Ion prostul ("Stupid Ion"), which, although believed by the publisher to be Bacalbașa's work, may in fact be a forgotten contribution by Caragiale. At around that time, George Ranetti also tried to revive Moș Teacă magazine, and continued to write humorous pieces in the manner introduced by Caragiale and Toni (a subject-matter that Călinescu has named Moftology). Moș Teacă grew in scope, and began publishing satires of Christianity. These earned it a poor reputation in the media, created a political controversy, and nearly resulted in a trial of Ranetti. Additionally, Ranetti used one of Bacalbașa's final texts as preface to a collection of jokes, which saw print in 1901. Caragiale also revived Moftul Român for a second series, wherein he continued to poke fun at the Symbolists and awarded a special prize to the stupidest literary work sent in for publishing.

The Bacalbașa genre had other significant effects on Romanian literature, and in particular on comedy-writing. Moș Teacă proved influential for the work of other Romanian writers, who were active in the interwar period: Gheorghe Brăescu, then Neagu Rădulescu. The name itself was virtually turned into a common noun (un moș teacă), applied to army men who are thought to display the same characteristics as Bacalbașa's anti-hero. In Romanian cuisine, the writer's name was given to a delicatessen variety of smoked ham.

In addition to Kirițescu and Cosco's notes, Toni was the subject of a 1924 monograph by socialist critic Barbu Lăzăreanu, and of a 1938 memoir by his Adevărul acquaintance Izabela Sadoveanu-Evan. In the 1930s, the aged Constantin Stere wrote his deceased friend into the autobiographical novel În preajma revoluției, as Toni Baclava.

After 1948, Bacalbașa's republicanism made him a favorite of the communist regime. In the 1950s, his anti-monarchic work was central to the Romanian curriculum, alongside selected pieces by other hand-picked republicans-socialists (N. D. Cocea, Traian Demetrescu, Dumitru Theodor Neculuță, Alexandru Toma). However, the anonymous Moftul Român articles which were evidently pro-socialist, and which are most likely Toni's contributions, were attributed to Caragiale by official authors such as Camil Petrescu. This was a counter-factual effort of transforming the Junimist writer into a champion of the left.

== See also ==
- List of peace activists
