= Nicolae Fleva =

Wallachian, later Romanian politician, journalist and lawyer

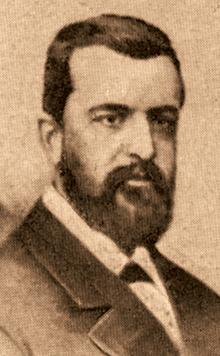

Mayor of Bucharest
- In office January 1884 – April 1886
- Preceded by: M. Török (as Head of Committee)
- Succeeded by: N. Manolescu

Romanian Minister of the Interior
- In office October 4, 1895 – January 5, 1896
- Preceded by: Lascăr Catargiu
- Succeeded by: Dimitrie Sturdza
- Constituency: Muscel County; Putna County; Bucharest; Prahova County

Romanian Minister of Agriculture and Royal Domains
- In office April 11, 1899 – June 7, 1900
- Preceded by: Dimitrie Sturdza
- Succeeded by: Nicolae Filipescu

Personal details
- Born: 1840 Râmnicu Sărat, Principality of Wallachia
- Died: August 4, 1920 (aged 79–80) Focșani, Kingdom of Romania
- Party: National Liberal Party; Conservative Party; Conservative-Democratic Party

Nicolae Fleva (Romanian pronunciation: [nikoˈla.e ˈfleva]; also known as Nicu Fleva, Francized Nicolas Fléva; 1840 – August 4, 1920) was a Wallachian, later Romanian politician, political journalist and lawyer. Known especially for his involvement in political incidents, and for a stated patriotism bordering on demagogy, he tested all political formulas that Romania's two-party system would allow. His activity in the public sphere brought a decades-long presence in the Assembly of Deputies and a mandate as Mayor of Bucharest between 1884 and 1886.

After beginnings with the National Liberal Party, which he helped establish and represented in court, Fleva came to oppose its monopoly on power. He experimented with creating a third party, negotiated common platforms for the various opposition forces, including the Conservatives and the Junimea society, during contiguous National Liberal administrations. Fleva was notoriously involved in the major scandals of the 1880s, when his ridicule of National Liberal power generated street battles and sparked two separate shooting incidents. At the time, "Flevist" groups were seen as the leading voice of middle class discontent, and formed one of several currents pushing for the adoption of universal male suffrage.

Fleva returned into the National Liberal camp when he was refused a leading role in Conservative cabinets, and, in 1895–1896, was the Internal Affairs Minister. He clashed with the party over a number of issues, returned into opposition, and was later (1899–1900) the Conservative Minister of Agriculture. Involved as both accused and whistleblower in some corruption scandals of the early 20th century, he was sent as Ambassador to Italy, and ended his career with a stint in the Conservative-Democratic Party. During World War I, Fleva brought suspicion on himself as a supporter, and possible agent of influence, of the Central Powers.

== Biography ==
=== Origins and early career ===
The future politician was born in the Wallachian town of Râmnicu Sărat to a family of low-ranking boyars. He was a descendant of Greek settlers, who probably arrived to the Buzău region during the Phanariote era. He had a sister, Cleopatra (married Tabacopol), whose daughter Alexandrina was married to Ion Istrati, Adjutant to the King of Romania between 1892 and 1897.

In youth, Nicolae Fleva attended the Saint Sava College, Bucharest, and graduated in law at the University of Naples (1867). Upon his return to Romania, Fleva spent a period tending to his lands in Putna County, pursuing interests in agriculture and horse breeding: he judged in ploughing contests at local fairs, and received a silver medal for his mare Diditia. Fleva brought professional harness racing to Romania, and received honorable mention for his own contribution to that sport.

In addition to building a legal career, and becoming one of the most successful legal professionals of the 1870s, Fleva created a trademark and highly unconventional political style. Described by contemporaries as possessing a warm and engaging voice, he relied on patriotic-themed oratory, and reportedly could speak for four hours on end without accepting interruptions. He notoriously organized electoral National Liberal rallies in front of patriotic landmarks, such as the Michael the Brave Monument in University Square. With time, Fleva became known to his supporters as Tribunul, "the Tribune", or variations of that nickname. Writing in 2011, journalist Maria Apostol called him "one of the most controversial political figures in the history of Romania." Fleva himself did not preoccupy himself with his colleagues' resentment of his conduct, publicizing his motto: "I'd rather have enemies who respect me than friends who despise me."

One of the first causes involving Fleva, as a young figure in the liberal-republican opposition, was the dispute between liberals and Romania's monarch, Domnitor Carol of Hohenzollern. The "Tribune" was first elected to the Assembly in the 1870 race, representing the 4th (lowest) Electoral College in Putna County. He stood out in that legislature with claims that the election for town and city councils were being rigged by the political establishment, and congratulated those who, like Nicolae Moret Blaremberg, denounced the politics of Prime Minister M. C. Epureanu.

The period saw him joining a defense team for soldiers and civilians prosecuted for their roles in the "Republic of Ploiești" conspiracy—all of them, including liberal leaders Ion Brătianu, C. A. Rosetti, Eugeniu Carada and Anton I. Arion, were acquitted. Fleva, who rested his defense tactic on contending that Epureanu's men had incited and misled Romanian republicans, publicized his speeches in court as the 1871 booklet Procesul lui 8 august. Apărarea făcută celor 41 acusați ("The Trial of August 8. The Defense of the 41 Accused"). This was to be the first of several confrontations between Fleva and Carol, who even consider abdicating the throne after the verdict came out.

Fleva was again sent to the Assembly after the 1871 election, but this time represented Muscel County. His hold of the seat was contested by a rival politician, Potoceanu: in early 1875, just before the scheduled election the Assembly plenum ruled to remove Fleva from his position of deputy.

=== 1875 arrest and the "Mazar Pașa" coalition ===
Subsequently, Fleva played a part in the effort to unite a single liberal opposition against the conservatism of Prime Minister Lascăr Catargiu and other political leaders closest to Carol. By then the Bucharest-based liberal movement expanded its basis, reaching out to various undecided liberal clubs. It was soon joined by the main anti-Catargiu factions: a moderate current spearheaded by Ion Ghica and Mihail Kogălniceanu; Nicolae Ionescu and his "Fractionists" from the eastern Romanian province of Moldavia; and a group of former conservatives such as Epureanu. The first result of their effort was a political gazette, Alegătorul Liber ("The Enfranchised Voter"). Fleva was part of the Editorial Committee, which included almost all of the liberal leadership (excluding C. A. Rosetti), and employed the young satirical journalist Ion Luca Caragiale as copy editor.

Carried by Fleva's oratory and by exposés in Alegătorul Liber, the liberal campaigners entered the 1875 electoral race with confidence. The moment degenerated in national confusion, after supporters of the two sides organized brawl and a pro-Catargiu electoral agent was killed in public. Citing concerns that Fleva was inciting Bucharest's populace, the Prime Minister ordered his arrest, and Fleva was detained in Văcărești Prison; the young politician was released in short time. Welcomed back by "a delirious crowd", he also took part in successfully defending the anti-conservative poet Alexandru Macedonski, who faced similar accusations.

The signing of a commercial agreement between Romania and Austria-Hungary, her protectionist neighbor to the northwest, angered the anti-Austrian liberals, to the point where a liberal conspiracy began to emerge. At this point in time, the liberal factions found support from Stephen "Mazar Pașa" Lakeman, who, as a loyal subject of the British Kingdom, may have intended to steer Romania away from its Austrian commitments. Fleva was personally involved in the negotiations presided upon by Lakeman, which resulted in the formation of a single National Liberal Party. His name features among those of 25 members of the party's "Steering Committee", on a list published by Rosetti's Românul in June 1875.

By March 1876, Catargiu fell out of favor with Carol, who reportedly decided that, as candidate for the premiership, Brătianu was "reasonable and humble". This followed a winter of National Liberal agitation, with renewed plans for a Romanian Republic, and then an understanding between the two sides, brokered by Romanian Police chief Ion Bălăceanu. Nicolae Fleva returned as National Liberal deputy in the early elections of 1876, and was reconfirmed in 1879.

The new Premier, Ion Brătianu, promoted Fleva to a position of influence in the party: with Eugeniu Stătescu and Mihail Pherekyde, Fleva controlled the grassroots campaign against non-liberals. With fellow deputy Pantazi Ghica, he organized a prolonged inquiry by Parliament into the activities of former ministers. From July to December 1876, his Informative Commission toured the country, verifying some 140 dossiers of secret correspondence, organizing house searches, and publishing a 964-pages report. He was at the time collecting support for a motion to sue Catargiu for damages, years after Catargiu had quelled the riots in Bucharest. Such initiatives embarrassed the more moderate liberals (led by Kogălniceanu and Epureanu), outraged the conservative press, and were ultimately defeated in Parliament.

Despite being engaged at the core of liberal politics, Fleva defended former Education Minister Titu Maiorescu, founder of the conservative club Junimea. Maiorescu was himself becoming a rival of Catargiu, and stood for a "Young Conservative" reform movement. Fleva's special commission investigated Maiorescu' malfeasance in office, following allegations made by the National Liberal Andrei Vizanti, and Fleva's vote helped clear Maiorescu of all charges. During those months, Fleva also participated in the heated debate about regulating wheat trade between Romania and the Russian Empire. Against the position held by Catargiu, and against voices from his own party, Fleva suggested that Russia's demand for most favored nation status was acceptable.

=== New-generation liberal and mayoral election ===
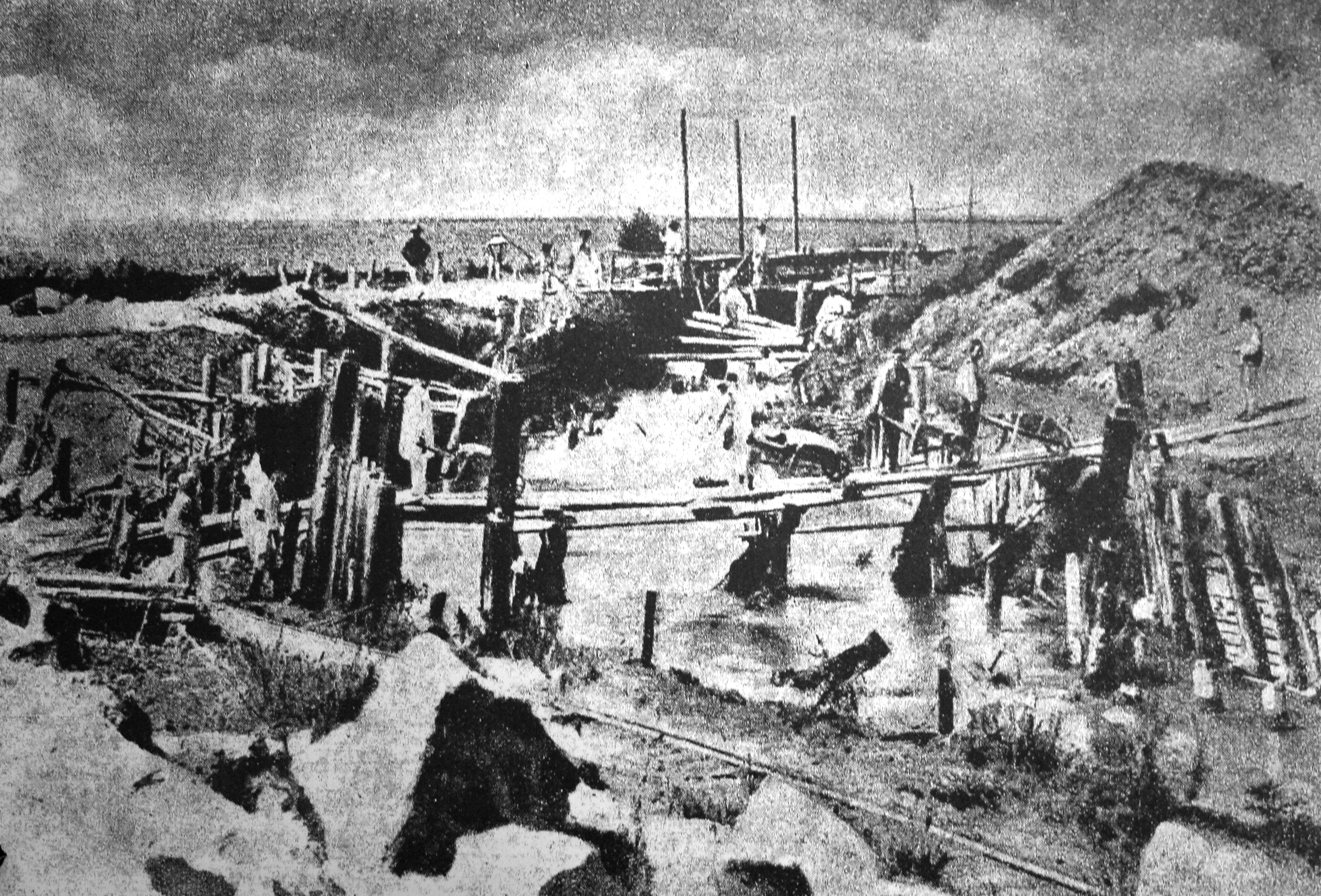
Public works on the Dâmboviţa River, ca. 1881–1886

Fleva's term as deputy also coincided with historical events relating to the Russo-Turkish War and Romanian independence. On May 9, 1877, he inquired Foreign Minister Kogălniceanu about the Russian attack on the Ottoman Empire; Kogălniceanu confirmed that Romania considered itself independent from her Ottoman sovereign. Although taken by some to mean that Romania was free as of May 9, this carefully staged discussion was rather a preamble to the actual independence declaration of May 10.

Having also presented himself in elections for the Bucharest Communal Council, Fleva became one of three assistants to Mayor C. A. Rosetti, whose mandate coincided with the first year of Romania's war. Also then, Fleva, Carada, Stătescu and other members of Rosetti's faction were elected officers of the "Citizens' Guard", a paramilitary organization. Their activity there was reported with alarm by the conservative gazette Timpul: "The city's Guard [...], following its earlier establishment as an armed force with commanders elected from within its own ranks, all of them improvised officers wearing [...] insignia designed during times of revolution, officers with no military skill, no discipline and no title [...], not only does it not represent any sort of guaranteed safety, but, what is more, could always turn itself into a dangerous element of social upheaval."

Around 1880, when the anti-liberal pole was organizing itself into the Conservative Party, Fleva was being identified by his adversaries as a main exponent of a new National Liberal ideology and morality. Writing for Timpul, the national conservative poet and essayist Mihai Eminescu stirred passions with his radical critique of this emerging group, nominating Fleva alongside Pherekyde and others as "foreign" and "superimposed" enemies of national development. In one of his lampoons, published in August 1882, Eminescu uses analogy to suggest that Pherekyde's shadow cabinet was an anti-national abomination: "Dear people! What would you say if the Chancellor of Germany were named Pherekydes, if its ministers were named Carada, Fleva and Chirițopol [...], if in that somewhere where all people have names like Meyer and Müller, all of its governing class were foreign? [...] You'd say: a destitute people that, driven to work like oxen to feed foreigners, foreigners and yet more foreigners."

As scholar Marius Turda notes, the objections were partly justified, since the new generation brought with it less credibility and more corruption. Fleva may even have been partly responsible for sacking Eminescu from the office of librarian, back when the National Liberals first began evaluating the loyalties of public servants. However, Eminescu's expanding xenophobia caused disquiet in Conservative circles, since many Conservative leaders were of noted Greek or other non-Romanian origin.

The interval witnessed renewed republican agitation, during which Nicolae Fleva openly sided with revolutionary politics. In 1883, when members of his party hoped to obtain Carol's resignation, he instructed the public about the right of revolution. His speech was reviewed in 2012 by academic Codrin Liviu Cuțitaru as a classic misinterpretation of that principle, since it validated a permanent "state of revolt" among those who felt disenfranchised. Fleva's position as deputy was reconfirmed in the 1883 national elections, and again in the 1884 vote. These were the first-ever elections to be carried under a new electoral law, pushed by the core group of National Liberal, and extending representation and disestablishing the 4th Electoral College. By then, the "Tribune" had his fief in Bucharest, and his appeal there propelled him to the office of Mayor during the local election of 1884. However, he also benefited from Eugeniu Stătescu's withdrawal from the National Liberal caucus, which propelled Fleva to head of the electoral list. Fleva did not replace an active Mayor, but rather took his seat from an interim bureau, presided upon by M. Török.

Fleva's own team of Councilors included 6 public figures, among them civil engineer Grigore Cerchez and future Mayor Ion Dobrovici (both of whom survived recall, serving in Fleva's second advisory team). The team's focus was on the sanitation of Dâmbovița River, for which purpose Mayor Fleva contracted English engineer William Lindley. Upon inspection, Lindley advised against using Dâmbovița as a water supply, even as filters had been installed, and the project began to redirect water from further upstream.

=== United Opposition ===
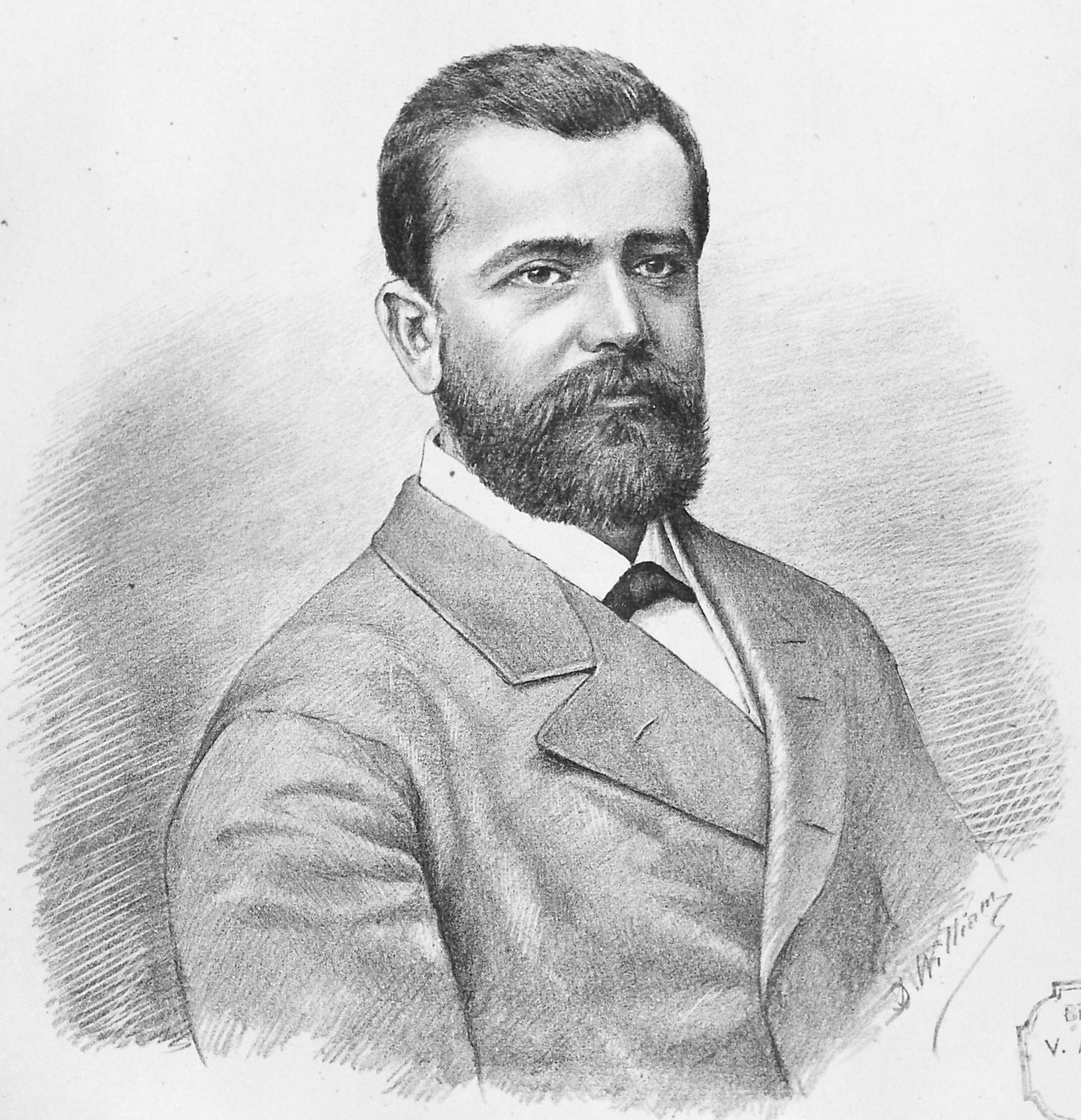
Nicolae Fleva in an 1881 lithograph

Fleva's time in National Liberal politics ended while he was still Mayor, under an Ion Brătianu cabinet. Known to his adversaries as "The Vizier", the Prime Minister was for a while unchallenged in his party, having marginalized his most powerful competitor C. A. Rosetti. Ion Brătianu even faced opposition from his brother, Dimitrie Brătianu. The latter took on Rosetti's campaign for universal male suffrage, but, unlike Rosetti's radicals, still favored the over-representation of Romania's middle class. Close to this pole, Fleva was among those jaded party militants who accused their Prime Minister of tyrannical stances, and who turned on Carol (by then King of Romania). This time around, Carol stood accused of having created a political machine in association with Ion Brătianu.

Fleva soon became the main accusatory voice, producing evidence which incriminated two National Liberal policy-makers: Emil Costinescu and Pherekyde. The latter, an expert shot, provoked Fleva to a duel by pistol, injuring his right hand. Fleva's personal quarrel with Brătianu reached its peak with another such duel. Brătianu was the one to provoke Fleva, when the latter described the cabinet as a collection of "shadows"; Fleva's shot missed its target and then Brătianu's bullet hit him near the heart, but he luckily survived.

The period witnessed the birth of a new political conglomerate, called "Liberal Conservative Party": the Conservatives, alongside the dissenting "Sincere Liberals", plus the Moldavian "Fractionists". Political trouble ensued. The monarch, who now trusted Brătianu above all other politicians, refused to apply his prerogative, and would not rotate between the two dominant factions.

With former enemy Catargiu, Fleva signed a manifesto against Carol, in which they alluded to the possibility of an anti-monarchical rebellion. In disparaging tone, the two united factions began referring to the National Liberal doctrinaires as "collectivists". Fleva was personally involved in forging the "United Opposition" bloc—he and Dimitrie Brătianu were among the recognized leaders of this new movement. Fleva also discussed cooperation with Junimea, the Conservative inner faction and splinter group, meeting with Junimist spokesman Alexandru Marghiloman. With Dimitrie Brătianu and other United Opposition men, he took part in agitation against the agents of government in Galați city, responding to reports that the elections there where always fraudulent. In 1886, his own faction was joined by other former National Liberals, including Constantin C. Arion and Take Ionescu. With Ionescu and young Conservative figure Nicolae Filipescu, Fleva created short-lived political club, the "League of Resistance" (1888), but Ionescu soon after made his way into the Conservative Party.

As Mayor, Nicolae Fleva was noted for setting up Sfântul Anton Market (near Manuc's Inn) and Eforiei Bathhouse (by Cișmigiu Gardens), and, in following with his passion for horses, for donating the Băneasa grounds which became Bucharest's Racecourse. During his mandate, Bucharest saw the completion of 1,190 townhouses, including tens of two-, three- or four-story buildings. Some have nevertheless described these as unimportant achievements; literary historian Ioana Pârvulescu summarizes his term with the words "he did nothing", while, according to Apostol, Fleva "left no trace on how Bucharest developed". The administration started with a budget of 8,500,000 French francs, but the collected sum dropped to 7,660,000 by 1885, and stabilized itself at 7,807,000 in 1886. Fleva eventually presented his resignation in April 1886, citing disagreements with the City Council and the leaders of Police. He had by then drafted and proposed, unsuccessfully, a reform of the law on the attributes of Prefects.

=== 1887–1888 riots ===
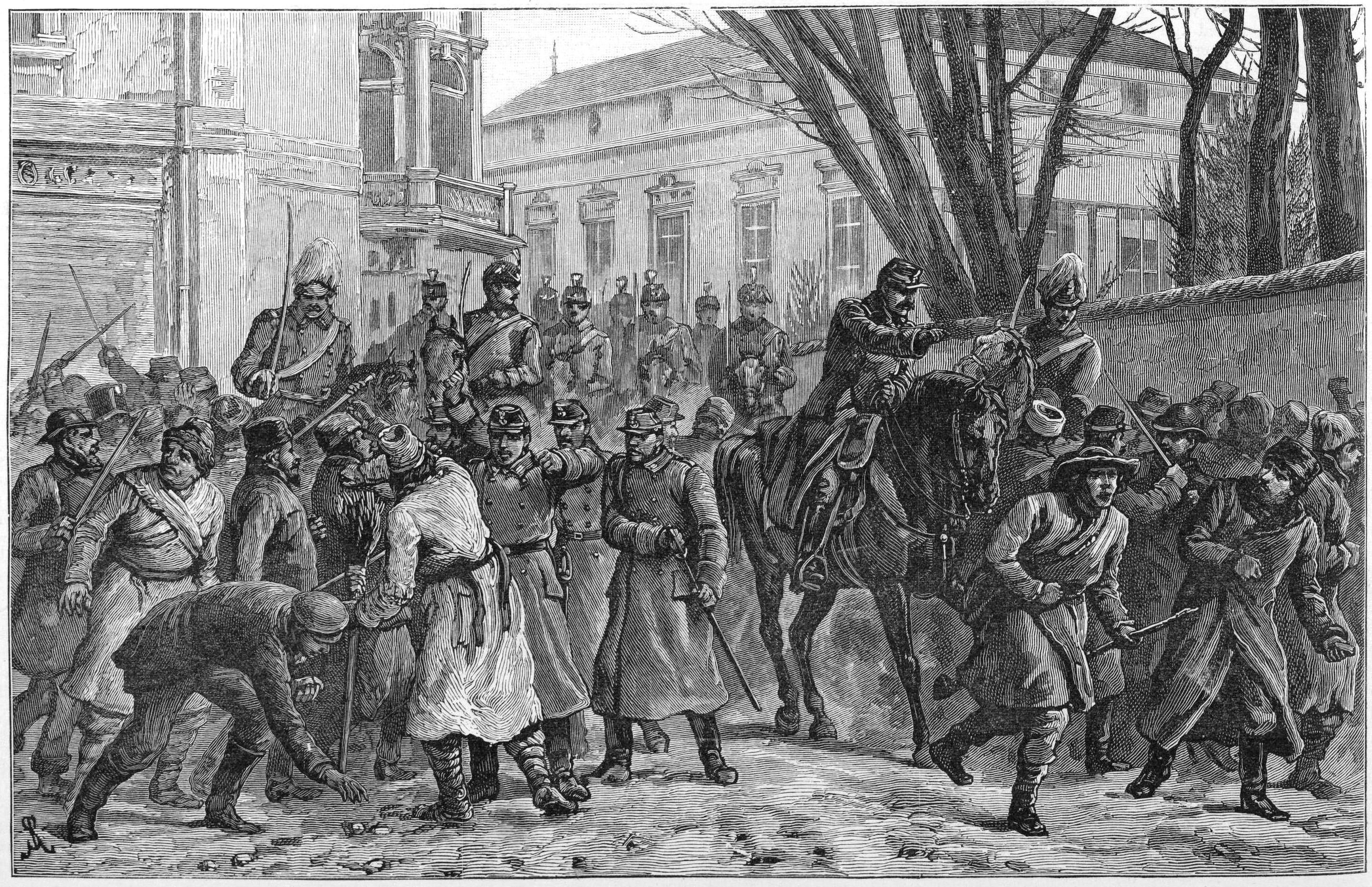
Riots in Bucharest: Dispersing the rioters in the street. The Illustrated London News, April 14, 1888

Such controversies reflected Nicolae Fleva's ongoing conflict with government: in 1887, he was again publicly asking King Carol not to endorse Ion Brătianu's agenda. He registered a personal victory by proving to the Assembly that government had pocketed large sums set aside for building Bucharest's system of forts. After disputed elections for the city council of Galați, the executive prosecuted Catargiu, Dimitrie Brătianu and George D. Vernescu as instigators. Fleva was part of the defense team (with Nicolae Moret Blaremberg, Petre Grădișteanu, Alexandru Lahovary, Alexandru Djuvara, George D. Pallade etc.); on December 18, 1887, the judge acquitted all of the accused. Fleva, Blaremberg and Ioan Lahovary also defended the republican George Panu in his legal face-off with the king (in his newspaper Lupta, Panu had published the United Opposition pamphlet "A Dangerous Man", where Carol was the main target). They lost, and Panu was sentenced to a two-year term in jail.

The electoral start of 1888 brought an explosive situation. All opposition forces, including Fleva's group, reached most of their electoral goals, even though the government remained in place. On March 14, when Carol returned from a visit to Berlin, Fleva, with Catargiu, Blaremberg and various others, instigated a riot which began at Orfeu Hall, Bucharest. Under their supervision, the crowd trying to occupy the building and make it an anti-government fief found its access blocked by pro-government men (soldiers, mounted Gendarmes, police or simply National Liberal militants). A chase followed through the city center, and the rioters attempted to make their way into the (old) Royal Palace, to demand that the king dispose of Brătianu. The king watched on, impassively.

The events were viewed with astonishment by the third parties at Junimea. Its elder Petre P. Carp reported his horror at seeing soldiers attacking people who had done "absolutely nothing". The United Opposition protest of March 15, which accused Brătianu of carrying out a "massacre", was signed by Junimists Marghiloman and Iacob Negruzzi, although not by Carp.

The same day, all opposition forces staged a March of Mourning to the Assembly Palace, but again the road was barricaded by armed forces. The deputies were allowed access into the hall, but the ceremony was interrupted when a rifle or a pistol was mysteriously shot, killing one of the ushers present. The deputies panicked before troops stormed in, and Carp was found standing near the dead body, engaged in a row with the National Liberals' Dimitrie Sturdza. A version of the events, promoted by journalist and memoirist Constantin Bacalbașa, points to a government conspiracy. According to Bacalbașa, I. Brătianu's men had paid a Sergent Silaghi to aim his gun at Fleva; the usher was shot by accident.

In the end, Fleva and Filipescu were both arrested. Fleva stood accused of inciting the riots, and even suspected of the murder: police alleged that a gun had been found on his person, but other reports state that none of the deputies was armed. Carp himself took the stand against government actions, denouncing a cover-up attempt.

=== Theodor Rosetti cabinet ===
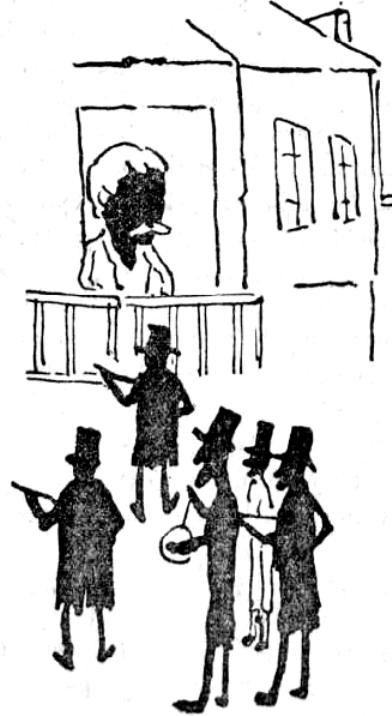
Constantin Jiquidi, Cor de negri ("Black Men's Choir"), 1888 cartoon in the Conservative paper Epoca. Fleva, George D. Pallade, and other National Liberal dissidents "serenading" the Conservative doyen Lascăr Catargiu

In short while, a mainly Junimist cabinet headed by Theodor Rosetti was to take over. This was Carol's own choice of Prime Minister: the king recognized the National Liberal crisis, but adamantly refused to follow the United Opposition agenda. Fleva was promptly released from Văcărești, and again delivered to the enthusiastic crowds. More disturbance soon followed. The Bărăgan Plain peasantry was rising up in revolt, believing that Rosetti was going to quash a National Liberal plan for extensive land reform. Their attack on private property was severely punished by the authorities.

Nicolae Fleva was subsequently approached by Carp with an offer to head Internal Affairs. Legend goes that there was a debate among them, concerning the sanctity of free suffrage, which governments in power tended to ignore. Fleva reportedly accepted Carp's initial offer, on condition that the Junimists hold free elections; the latter's reply was: "No free elections! But we'll get real elections!" The pro-Conservative daily România Liberă, whose editor Duiliu Zamfirescu was a passionate critic of Fleva, suggested that there was an unbridgeable gap, in both doctrine and interests, between the former two sides of United Opposition: "On one hand the Junimists with the Liberal-Conservatives and the Young Conservatives, supporting the government and holding the door open for all men of decency who, through similarity in ideas, may wish to work for the actual consolidation of the state and a true betterment of Romanian society; on the other the defeated collectivists, who will put out for any liberal who will fight the government, be they Fleva, Panu, Grădișteanu and Dim[itrie] Brătianu. In order to grow back into a force, [the National Liberals] are willing to bring into the family even their most unrelenting enemies of yesterday."

Fleva himself acknowledged that the split had occurred: leaving behind the United Opposition, he presented himself as an independent in the 1888 race for the Bucharest City Hall. A number of local guilds, including the cooperative movement of Dimitrie C. Butculescu, supported him in this effort, but he only finished in a distant third; the Conservative Pache Protopopescu won the day. With the second-round Assembly elections, he won a seat in Prahova, in a loose alliance with the National Liberals, announcing his reconciliation with I. Brătianu. In the process, Fleva lost the respect of his Conservative ally, Filipescu, who denounced him as a vacuous (and therefore detestable) "man of the people".

Slowly, Fleva returned into the National Liberal fold. In 1890, he voted against prosecuting I. Brătianu for alleged mismanagement of the country, and also against Panu's proposal to reestablish the League of Resistance. Leaving Panu behind, he and D. Brătianu rejoined the National Liberal directorial committee. Fleva was a National Liberal candidate to the Assembly of Deputies in the election of January 1891. He won the second available seat for that constituency, benefiting from months of Junimist and Conservative infighting.

Fleva's return as a National Liberal doctrinaire was facilitated by I. Brătianu's death in 1891. He was persuaded by the new party leader, Dimitrie Sturdza, and his platform, the "Program of Iași" (November 1892). It promised to support the gradual introduction of universal male suffrage and proportional representation. However, Fleva failed to persuade Sturdza that the party should come to power by rebellion. King Carol firmly supported the Conservative administration, again headed by Catargiu. Finally, Premier Catargiu was denounced by Fleva for ordering a clampdown on the republican newspaper, Adevărul.

=== Interior Minister ===
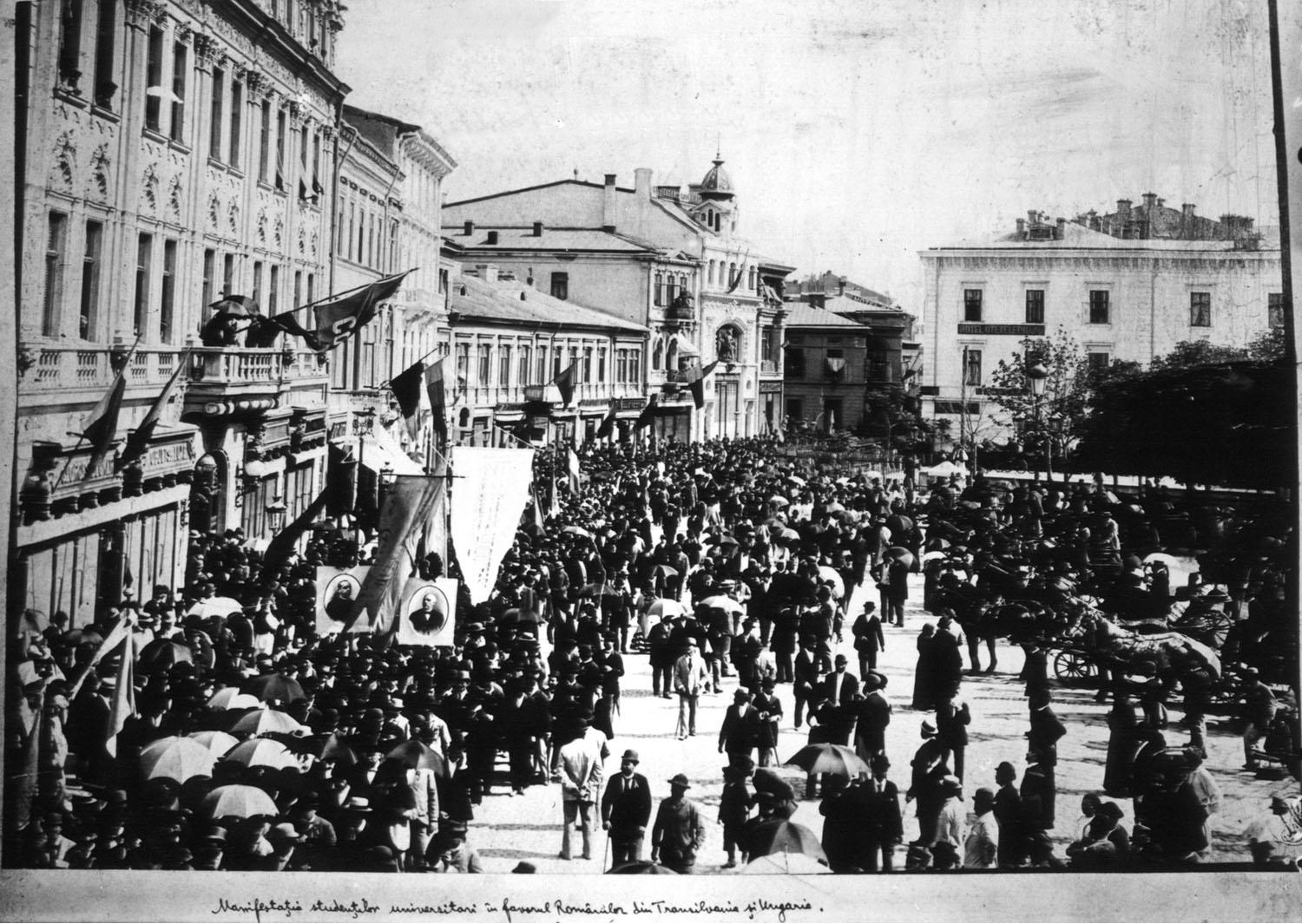
Bucharest crowds demonstrating in support of Transylvania, 1892

During that time, Fleva was especially interested in the fate of Romanians living in Transylvania or in other parts of Austria-Hungary, many of whom were complaining about government abuse and Magyarization policies (Transylvanian Memorandum). Representing Romania at a peace congress in Rome, Fleva spoke positively about the demands of Romanian Transylvanian students, and obtained from the international representative a resolution favoring respect for national rights. He built contacts with Austria-Hungary's Romanian National Party and the Cultural League for the Unity of All Romanians, being a special guest at their 1894 banquet in Bucharest. Also that year, Fleva donated books to the Romanians of Bukovina region, through their Society for Romanian Literature and Culture.

Fleva was again in Parliament in December 1894, when he narrowly lost the elections for Assembly Vice President. He had a notoriously tense relationship with Eugeniu Carada, who, as the National Liberal's economic adviser, had helped establish Romania's National Bank. In February 1894, Fleva upset Carada by running for National Bank Censor, with support from the Conservatives and the Junimists. Like the other National Liberal deputies, Fleva resented the ultra-capitalist Law on Mining, passed by the Conservative majority. However, he distanced himself from those deputies who resigned in protest against the bill: when he did hand in his resignation, it was rejected by his Conservative friends, including Filipescu.

In October 1895, Fleva came to lead Internal Affairs, within Sturdza's National Liberal cabinet. Once appointed by Carol, the government had to be confirmed by an election, and, sources attest, Fleva served his democratic ideal by ensuring that the 1895 election was carried without fraud.

At the time, Nicolae Fleva's perceived demagogy was a subject of amusement: painter-aristocrat Eugen N. Ghika-Budești published cartoons of Fleva, showing him as a would-be Gracchus of Romania. This interval also made Fleva a prime target of celebrated Romanian satirist Ion Luca Caragiale, once an Alegătorul Liber colleague, who had by then moved closer to Junimist politics. In the 1880s, Caragiale had recorded with irony some of Fleva's republican statements, particularly those criticized for inciting bad government. Caragiale ridiculed claims that Fleva's ministerial mandate was an episode of electoral freedom, depicting him for posterity as pathological in his loquacity. Caragiale's Fleva exhausts himself talking about clergy, Gendarmes, linguistic protectionism and "the sovereign people".

Fleva's involvement in popular causes was turning into a liability. His reintegration by the National Liberal Party effectively split the movement into two competing factions: the "Flevists", or "Liberal Democratic Party", represented the middle class and petite bourgeoisie vote; the "Sturdzists" mainly brought together landowners and bankers. The Prime Minister, notorious for his lack of authority, and his Internal Affairs subordinate despised each other, particularly since Fleva realized that Sturdza would never apply the "Program of Iași".

According to some, Fleva's fight against government abuse was what caused his fall during a cabinet reshuffling, only three months after electoral victory. C. Bacalbașa notes that Fleva first attracted his colleagues' hostility when he inspected first-hand, and punished, the damage done by government representatives in the village of Spineni. Sturdza interpreted this work as a sign of disloyalty, and the National Liberal paper Voința Națională made a show of Fleva, publishing allegations about his conduct in both public and private. In what was virtually an unprecedented gesture, Titu Maiorescu, who had become leader of the opposition, denounced such mudslinging from the Assembly's rostrum.

=== Fodder scandal and 1897 split ===
Fleva was eventually faced with accusations that, while in office, he had secretly engaged in contraband. Iepurescu, a Giurgiu County representative, questioned the Minister's provisions against fodder shortages. Iepurescu's story was that, against the specialists' advice, Fleva had ordered massive imports of hay for national or ministerial use. Some, beginning with Maiorescu, have questioned whether Iepurescu himself was a man of character. Fleva asked to present his version with a speech in Parliament, programmed for January 13, 1896. On January 12, Sturdza confirmed that Fleva had lost his office, implying that his activity during the elections was under scrutiny; when the Assembly began preparing procedures to oust him, Fleva became enraged, denouncing the National Liberal Party as an occult organization. He is believed to have coined the term Oculta ("The Occult [Faction]"), which was subsequently used to designate the secretive triumvirate of National Liberal figures, allegedly Sturdza's puppet-masters: Carada, Pache Protopopescu, Gogu Cantacuzino.

The next day, instead of the scheduled pro domo, the Assembly registered his resignation. Founding the independent newspaper Dreptatea, Fleva turned on his former colleagues in power. In early 1896, he attacked Sturdza for his external policy, creating a scandal about the selective sponsoring of Aromanian schools throughout the Balkans. In his anti-Sturdza campaign, Fleva approached the country's breakaway socialist clubs. Some socialists did join his faction, but others condemned him for not supporting the immediate adoption of universal suffrage.

Fleva's disaffiliation with the National Liberals grew once Sturdza and his ministers intervened in Orthodox Church affairs—deposing Metropolitan-Primate Ghenadie Petrescu. Fleva took Ghenadie's side. Especially for the purpose, he set up a new anti-government coalition with the Conservatives, and lend a hand to the eventual fall of Sturdza's cabinet in November 1896. During the incidents, Fleva reunited with his old friend Alexandru Macedonski, by then a maverick conservative; his articles in support of Ghenadie were published by Macedonski's political-literary review Liga Ortodoxă. Also joining Fleva's group were the former socialists George A. Scorțescu, who published Evenimentul newspaper, and Anton "Toni" Bacalbașa. Pushing for a return to power, Fleva sought to align himself with the king's external policy. Toning down his support for Transylvanian agitation, he published a salute to Austrian Emperor Franz Joseph, who was visiting Bucharest. Despite such overtures, the outgoing Sturdza received a formal promise from his many adversaries that Fleva would never again be granted ministerial office.

Subsequently, the parliamentary Flevists (described by one Transylvanian observer as "Mr. Fleva and seven of his comrades") reluctantly voted in favor of some National Liberal laws, but aimed most of its activities against Sturdza's cabinet. In February 1898, Fleva was the only parliamentarian to vote against the national debt-conversion project, as advanced by Finance Minister Gogu Cantacuzino. In tandem, a second dissident faction, formed around Petre S. Aurelian and Drapelul newspaper, and likewise attached to electoral reform projects, took still more voters away from the National Liberal Party. Instead of courting the Flevists, Sturdza managed to prolong his hold on power by attracting back some of the Drapelul men, including some 13 deputies.

=== Agriculture Minister ===
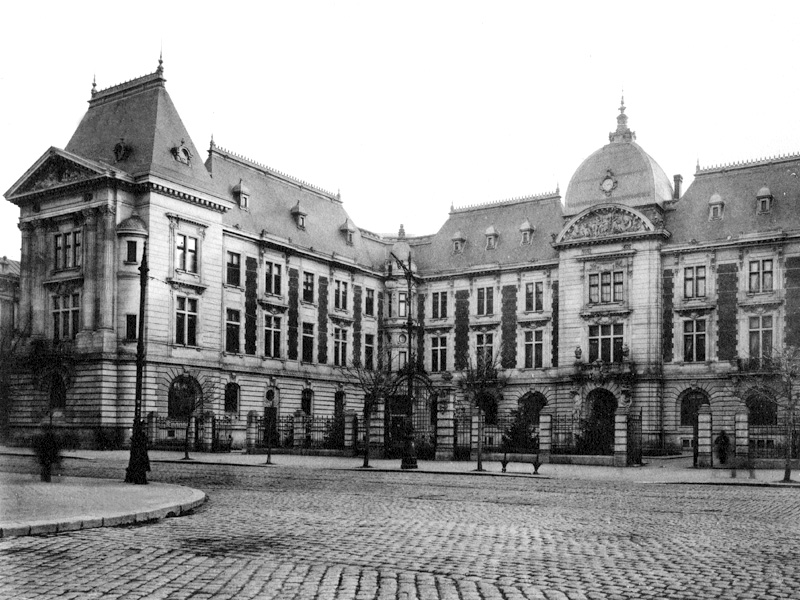
Palace of the Ministry of Agriculture and Royal Domains, photographed by Alexandru Antoniu in 1900

The Conservative and Junimist factions preserved Fleva in their camp, making him more or less concrete promises about a return to high office. In their name, Fleva carried out street battles with the Sturdza party, and, with Maiorescu and others, established a "Committee of Resistance" (against the Strudza government). A classically trained scholar, Maiorescu expressed disdain for all the liberal subgroups, as sciolistic upstarts. In a letter of June 1898, he made special note of these developments: "All the Liberals, the Drapelul men and of course the Flevists too, are utterly ignorant (except for Sturdza and Beldiman [...]) and enrich themselves through politics. [...] Stătescu or Lascăr, or Costinescu, or Fleva [...] might even be looking to find Camões among their contemporaries". Historian Ion Bulei, who sees Maiorescu's text is a cruel satire, also writes that it addresses a deeper reality: "if the doctrinaire level of all Romanian politicians was rather base in what was Old Romania, the liberals' was yet more base. Between the practical accomplishments of the National Liberal Party and the level of its intellectual preoccupations, there was always disharmony."

Reputedly, Fleva officially joined the Conservative Party in 1899, but, to the press, he was more a "national democrat" ally of the Conservative militants. On April 11 of that year, Premier Gheorghe Grigore Cantacuzino came to power after the fall of another Sturdza cabinet and four months of government crisis, placing Fleva in charge of the Ministry of Agriculture and Royal Domains. He would serve until June 7, 1900. The "Tribune" also received a ninth mandate in the Assembly during the elections of 1899, which confirmed the Conservative gains.

However, the election itself dampened his ministerial ambitions: in Slatina, the peasant voters were allegedly instigated to rebel by the political boss Alexandru Bogdan-Pitești, leading to a massacre. Probably called upon as an arbiter by Bogdan-Pitești, Fleva visited the area and conducted an inquiry. As a consequence of the government's mistakes in handling the crisis, Fleva is said to have considered resigning.

This new mandate was soon touched by another controversy involving fodder supplies. With drought on the horizon, Fleva again ordered imported hay, much more than was needed, and any excess amount was destroyed by rainfall. Fleva himself observed irregularities at the State Fisheries, but his move to depose their caretaker, Grigore Antipa, was resisted by other Conservatives. Another unusual and criticized decision taken by Fleva (in his secondary capacity as Minister of Industry and Commerce) was the abolition of virtually all patents, measures justified by his belief that intellectual property rights were holding back industrialization. This policy, backed by a sizable portion of the public, was only repealed in 1906, under continued pressure from the international arms industry.

=== Ambassador and Conservative-Democrat ===
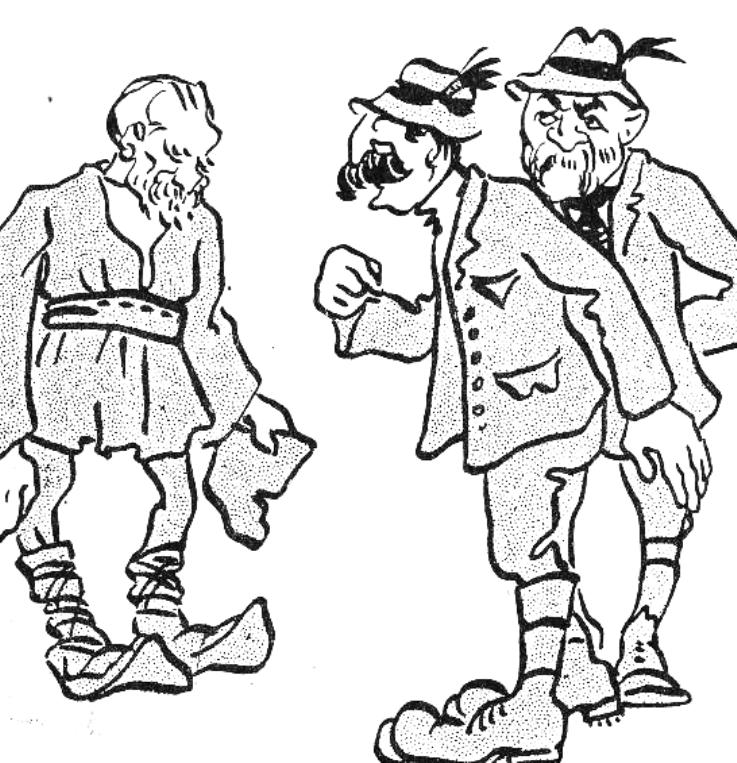
Fleva and Take Ionescu as fellow demagogues, trading in "thumping lies". 1908 cartoon by Ion Theodorescu-Sion

In February 1901, Nicolae Fleva was made the Romanian Ambassador to Italy—a position he maintained until July 1909. As one of his activities there, Fleva officially represented Romanian interests during the creation of an International Institute of Agriculture, and signed its founding document in 1905. During those years, Fleva was also indulging his passion for horse racing. After 1905, when a replica of Longchamp Racecourse was eventually built in Bucharest (on grounds now occupied by House of the Free Press), he became one of the regular visitors.

While still involved in European diplomacy, Fleva was attracted into the Conservative-Democratic Party. This new force rallied around his old colleague Take Ionescu, who, like Fleva himself, had divided his earlier career between the two main parties. Described by the press as Ionescu's right hand, Fleva ran in the Assembly elections of 1908, as top of the Conservative-Democratic list for Bucharest. His campaign was unusually supported by Caragiale, who had turned Conservative-Democrat, and who spoke directly to the regular voters about Fleva's merits. Fleva received most votes (1,223), and propelled his party into the top position.

After taking his seat, he returned to national attention, investigating cases of corruption cited against both of the major parties. In November 1911, he demanded an official scrutiny into the public contracts signed over by the new Petre P. Carp Conservative administration. He looked over Romanian Railways ledgers, investigated the collapse of Galați docks, and exposed the (allegedly overpriced) works on NMS Regele Carol and NMS România. Fleva was the first, and for long only, member of Parliament to note that Vintilă Brătianu, the National Liberal Mayor of Bucharest, was in a conflict of interest. The matter, which focused on how City Hall granted the contract for a new tramcar line, later exploded nationally as the "Tramcar Affair".

By January 1912, Fleva's relationship with the Conservative-Democrats had turned into hostility. He quit the party, which had by then allied itself to the National Liberals, noting that Ionescu no longer stood for the initial goals: updating the 1866 Constitution and promoting land reform. A year later, a Conservative—Junimist—Conservative-Democratic alliance was in power, with Titu Maiorescu as Prime Minister. Fleva took to the dissident Conservative club of Grigore G. Cantacuzino, which published the gazette Seara. This notoriously bawdy and violent paper was mounting a campaign against Interior Minister Alexandru Bădărău; Fleva joined in, with a claim that Bădărău was demented. The cause reunited Fleva with Bogdan-Pitești, his 1899 rival, who had returned to public life as Seara's editorial manager. In 1913, when Bogdan-Pitești was taken to court by the financier Aristide Blank, Fleva headed the defense team. They lost, and Bogdan-Pitești was found guilty of attempted blackmail.

=== World War I controversies and death ===
Fleva was again a member of the Assembly in the 1914 legislature. Immediately after the start of World War I, when Romania found itself in uncertain neutrality, he spoke from the Assembly rostrum as an advocate of the Entente Powers. At the time, he believed that fighting alongside the Entente, and therefore against Austria-Hungary, would guarantee Romania's integration of Transylvania and other irredenta: "our public, being a Latin people [...] could only have felt its interests as being at one with those of the Triple Entente [...]. We must not be looking on impassably to the fate of the Romanian nation in Transylvania, to how it is being torn asunder." A failure to answer this call, he claimed, would have made his "the least worthy of all generations".

As time progressed, Fleva became more sympathetic to the "Germanophile" camp, which pushed for committing Romania to the Central Powers (see Romania in World War I). The same course was maintained by Seara, managed at that stage by a consortium of businessmen from the German Empire. Dimineața daily, which had anti-German and pro-Entente sentiments, reported with pleasure that the Germans could not convince Fleva to take over as Seara's editorial manager; its claims were partly backed by Fleva's own note, published in Dreptatea (November–December 1914). Fleva reportedly received such offers from two German propagandists, Hilmar von dem Bussche-Haddenhausen and Josef B. Brociner. Not dignifying them with an answer, he even threw Brociner out in the street. Interviewed by Adevărul, he denounced Bussche's politics, and called off his bid.

As his critics claim, Fleva's determination did not outlast the "morning dew": Bussche and his Romanian agent, the Slatina revolutionist-turned-Germanophile Bogdan-Pitești, increased the stakes. In October 1915, Fleva signed on as "Political Director" of Libertatea ("Freedom"). Probably the second Germanophile tribune to be secretly financed by Bogdan-Pitești, it was in fact edited by the young activist writers Tudor Arghezi and Gala Galaction. This sheet was mainly the voice of left-wing Germanophilia, maintaining that the need to enact social reforms was more pressing than any nationalist casus belli. Although he resigned only a month into his assignment, Fleva still published with Libertatea until Romania declared war on Germany.

From the pro-Entente camp, but also from among his own circles, accusations surfaced that Fleva had in fact become an agent of influence for the German Empire. The Germanophile figure Ioan Bianu specifically noted that Fleva had received 100,000 lei from German intelligence before taking over at Libertatea (the information was probably backed by a 1916 official report, now lost, on the subversive activities of German oil investor Albert E. Günther). According to other sources, this was only a fraction of the sum promised to him by Bussche. In that account, Bussche allowed Fleva to humiliate himself, and withdrew the offer as soon as "the Tribune" fulfilled his part of the deal—a belated revenge for the Adevărul interview. Such allegations remain unproven, and, to his admirers, Fleva endured the incorruptible politician.

Fleva survived the war and the Central Powers' two-year-long occupation of southern Romania. He died on August 4, 1920, either in Jideni (now part of Râmnicu Sărat) or in Focșani. He was by then noticeably poor, and largely forgotten by the general public.
