= Alexandru Ionescu (socialist militant) =

Romanian typographer, early labour leader and socialist journalist

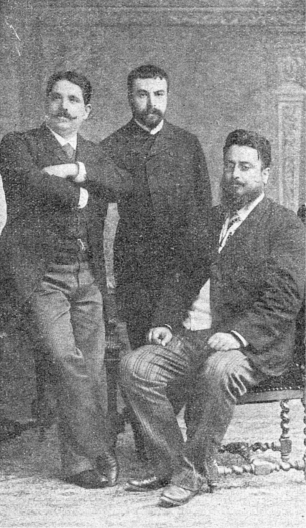
- Alexandru Ionescu, Vasile G Morţun, and Ioan Nădejde, 1893
- Born: July 29, 1862; Bucharest, United Principalities of Moldavia and Wallachia
- Died: July 9, 1929 (aged 66); Bucharest, Romania

Alexandru Ionescu (July 29, 1862 – July 9, 1929) was a Romanian typographer, early labour leader and socialist journalist. A founding member of Romanian Social Democratic Workers' Party (PSDMR), he was part of its leadership throughout its existence, at the same time working for the unionisation of the Romanian workers. One of the few party leaders with actual working-class background, Ionescu opposed collaboration with the bourgeois political parties, and continued to support the existence of a workers' party even after the other leaders of PDSMR decided on the party's dissolution. A founder, along fellow-minded socialists, of the Working-class Romania circle, Ionescu grew estranged from the main socialist grouping due to disagreements over the newly established labour legislation. Joining the government-sanctioned corporations, he supported at times ideas contradictory to his former socialist positions, but ultimately he rejected corporatism as a form of labour organisation. Despite some attempts at collaboration, he would never reintegrate in the mainstream socialist movement.

== Early life and labour activism ==
Alexandru Ionescu was born in Bucharest, in a working-class family. After finishing primary school, he was employed as a compositor at the State Publishing House, then as a student typographer at the Carol Göbl publishing house. Becoming a maker-up, he also worked in the typographic enterprises of the newspapers Curierul financiar and Le people Roumain. In 1880, after four years of apprenticeship, he became a qualified worker, and was employed by the typography of the newspaper L'Indépendance Roumaine.

Around 1883, Alexandru Ionescu was introduced to socialist ideas by the left-wing journalist Constantin Mille. Entering the administration council of the Gutenberg Society, a benefit society reuniting employers and employees in the typographical industry, in 1885, Ionescu supported the collaboration of the association with the Deşteptarea Society, which only comprised workers, even becoming secretary of the latter society. By 1886, he was the editor of the Gutenberg, the organ of the typography workers, and, along Mille, a member of the Bucharest's Circle of Social Studies. His articles, frequently criticising the working conditions in the industry, brought him into conflict with the employers; as a result the Telegraful typography fired him for "inciting workers to rebellion". In November 1887 he was again fired, this time from the State Publishing House, after organising a rally protesting the arrest of socialist activist Anton Bacalbaşa. During the same period, Ionescu was one of the founders of the first workers' cultural association in Romania, the Workers' Circle, sitting as one of its two secretaries. Dissolved by the authorities in 1888 following major strikes, the Circle was reorganised in the second half of 1889, even succeeding to publish a journal, Revolta. Through the activism of Ionescu, Bacalbaşa and Panait Muşoiu, the Circle's membership rose to 300 by the beginning of 1890. This allowed the transformation of the Circle into the Workers Club in February 1890. The executive committee of the Club included Ionescu, Mille, Ioan Nădejde, and Muşoiu. The same year he joined the other members of the committee as an editor at the Munca newspaper, one of the earliest Romanian socialist journals. His articles covered various issues, from social investigations and the electoral system to the abuses of the authorities and the repression of the peasants. In 1892 he was elected vice-president of the Gutenberg association, four years later being promoted to president. During this period he worked towards the creation of a nationwide trade union of the workers in the typographic domain. Through his efforts, by the end of the 19th century the typographers from Iaşi, Ploieşti, and Craiova became associated with Gutenberg.

== Activity in the PSDMR ==
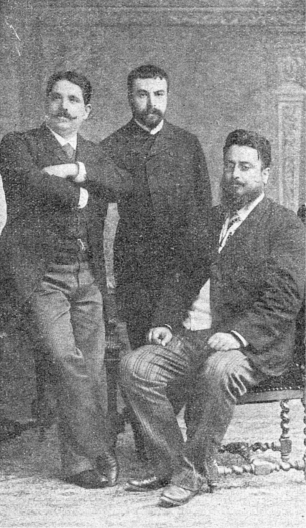
Alexandru Ionescu (left) with fellow PSDMR leaders Vasile Morţun and Ioan Nădejde in 1893

Following years of exploratory meetings, in 1893 Alexandru Ionescu was one of the supporters of the creation of the Romanian Social Democratic Workers' Party (PSDMR), providing it with working class support by affiliating the Gutenberg to it. The First Congress of the PSDMR elected him member in the General Council, position he held until the party's disestablishment in 1899. As member of the PSDMR's leadership, Ionescu toured the country extensively, attempting to gather support for party from the workers of Galaţi, Brăila, Craiova, Ploieşti and Iaşi. With the revival of the Circle of Social Studies, he was one of the socialists who held regular conferences at the Sotir Hall, group which also included Nădejde, Vasile Morţun, and Constantin Dobrogeanu-Gherea. Between 1891 and 1899 he was constantly on the socialist electoral lists for the second college, along Ioan Nădejde, Morţun, and Mille. Despite opposition from other leaders, Alexandru Ionescu supported the creation of an official organ of the party. The Second Congress of the PSDMR eventually decided in his favour, and in 1895 the newspaper Lumea Nouă went into print. Through his personal efforts, he was also able to establish a party typography, receiving praise at the Fifth Congress of the party. During late 1896, following several discussion at the Bucharest's Workers' Club, 14 professional organisations decided to create a labour federation, the Union of the guilds' trade unions, with Ionescu elected as president of the federation's Permanent Council in January 1897. In the meantime he continued his journalistic activity, publishing in Munca, Lumea Nouă, Democraţia socială, Gutenberg, Almanahul socialist, and other socialist newspapers and magazines. His articles targeted the miserable life of the working class, the growing unemployment, as well as the politics of the two bourgeois parties. Ionescu also collaborated as a reporter with the republican newspaper Adevărul, but left in 1894, after the party decided the collaboration with a bourgeois journal counter-productive to the workers' cause.

As one of the few members of the council with genuine working-class background, Alexandru Ionescu opposed the attempts of other leaders to forge alliances with the "bourgeois parties" (the National Liberal and Conservative parties), seeking to bring the party closer to the proletariat. As a result, he come into a dispute with fellow PSDMR leader, Vasile Morţun, who envisioned the activism of the party as limited to memorandums and negotiations with the National-Liberal and Conservative politicians. Favouring direct workers' action instead, Alexandru Ionescu participated in several strikes, including those that took place at the Bucharest Railways Workshops (1888), at the Army's Tailoring Workshops (1893), and in the leather cutters strike of 1891. On December 30, 1898, as president of the Gutenberg association, he declared a general strike of the typography workers. The demands included a 9-hour workday, Sunday rest, and a minimal weekly salary. Despite several pressures from the employers and the state authorities, who even sent soldiers in the typographies to replace the striking workers, the strike gathered 600 workers and lasted for ten weeks. It also garnered support from the International Typographical Secretariat in Bern, which supported it financially. The principles demanded by the Gutenberg association were accepted by 24 of the 28 typographical workshops in Bucharest (the enterprises which refused to accept the demands of the workers notably included the publishers of Adevărul, owned by former socialist Mille).

Alexandru Ionescu's growing opposition to the bourgeois members of the PSDMR leadership ("the generous youth") and their collaboration with the National Liberals led to his estrangement from the party. Nevertheless, he still supported the unity of the labour movement, and condemned the creation in 1898 of a new workers' club, influenced by nationalist and anti-Semitic ideas. In March 1899, in a Lumea Nouă article, Ionescu firmly rejected the idea of dissolving the party, gaining the support of Iosif Nădejde, I. C. Frimu and Constantin Z. Buzdugan. As a result, he was not invited at the hastily organised Sixth Congress of the PSDMR, when the bourgeois-dominated leadership decided on the party's disestablishment. Although the Roman delegation invited him as its representative, Ionescu rejected in an open letter the legality of the Congress. Expressing his contempt for the bourgeois leaders of the party who had publicly abandoned basic socialist tenets such as collective property and internationalism, he called on the workers to reject any resolutions made at the meeting. As the "generous" faction, led by Morţun and George Diamandy, decided to go ahead with the transformation of the PSDMR into a non-Marxist party, most of the proletarian delegates, including Frimu, Buzdugan and Alecu Constantinescu, resigned in protest.

== România Muncitoare ==
While those responsible for the disestablishment of the PSDMR went on to join the National Liberal Party (PNL), Alexandru Ionescu attempted to reorganise a workers' party with the help of other proletarian former members of the PSDMR. A meeting of the few remaining socialist, which also included Iosif Nădejde, Buzdugan and Dimitrie Marinescu, attempted to revive the party in a June 1899 meeting, but the clubs had already dissolved in the aftermath of the Sixth Congress, and little progress was possible. Nevertheless, Ionescu participated in the 1899 elections as the Bucharest Workers' Club candidate for the second electoral college, succeeding in obtaining more votes than Vintilă Brătianu, future prime-minister of Romania, although not enough to win the seat. Another feeble success of the reorganised Club was the organisation of the May Day celebrations in 1900. Around this period he also bought along fellow worker Alexandru Georgescu the former party's typography, which had accumulated major debts. Although this decision would be later criticised by other socialists, the transaction allowed the typography to continue printing the journal Lumea Nouă.

In 1901 Ionescu withdrew from the presidency of the Gutenberg association, but continued to collaborate with the local socialists. Later that year, the former members of the PSDMR which remained faithful to the socialist ideas created a new organisation, the România Muncitoare ("Working Class Romania") Circle, which in January 1902 began publishing the first short lived series of the eponymous newspaper. Alexandru Ionescu, the managing editor of the new publication, condemned as opportunist the betrayal of the bourgeois former members of the PSDMR, who had by then received high political offices with the support of the PNL. When Ioan Nădejde referred (in an Adevărul interview) to the socialist revival in Romania as an "utopia", Ionescu replied by expressing his belief that the workers should have their own organisations, despite the industrial backwardness of the country. Furthermore, he rejected the idea that the workers' movement should act as an appendage to the PNL. A dispute also arose among the editorial staff of România Muncitoare around the "Law of the Crafts" (also known as the "Missir Law", after the PNL politician that proposed it). The law, based on corporatist principles, while bringing some improvements to the working conditions in Romania, prevented the formation of trade unions. A group around I.C. Frimu, D. Marinescu and Ştefan Gheorghiu firmly opposed the law, while another, which included Ionescu and Iosif Nădejde, had a more favourable view, believing corporations will gradually improve workers' lives. Alecu Constantinescu also supported joining corporations, although he hoped these could be transformed into socialists organisations from within. The supporters of the corporation succeeded in imposing their editorial line, however the newspaper ceased printing soon after.

== Corporatism and later life ==
Maintaining his support for the corporations as a mean to organise the working class, Alexandru Ionescu succeeded in being elected vice-president of the Bucharest Graphical Arts Corporation in 1902. His attempts to introduce into the corporation's charter some guarantees for workers' welfare, such as minimum wage or fixed working time, failed, as they met the resistance of the employers. In March 1903 Ionescu was also elected in the Trade Chamber of the Bucharest Chamber of Commerce and Industry, however his election was invalidated on the intervention of the agriculture minister, who feared Ionescu would be able to introduce socialist ideas on the agenda of the organisation. In July 1903 Ionescu suffered a temporal lobe abscess, and, although he quickly underwent surgery, he was left with amnesic aphasia, forcing him out of all public positions. Only in the second half of 1904 he was able to retake his position in the corporation, also starting to work in the typography he owned. He maintained his post in the leadership of the corporation until the end of the decade, at times supporting positions that came into clear contradiction with the socialist ideas he had championed around the turn of the century. Resigning from the corporation in April 1909, Ionescu expressed in a România Muncitoare article his disenchantment with this employer-controlled form of workers' organisation, and recognised that trade unions were better fitted to represent the interests of the proletarians. However, he did not join the socialist movement.

Only after World War I did Ionescu return to socialist politics, issuing in 1919 a manifesto with ideas similar to those professed by the Socialist Party of Romania (PSR). On the insistence of Ilie Moscovici, he also joined the Bucharest organisation of the PSR, but left in September, after disagreeing with the party's support of an waiters' strike. Ionescu regarded the waiters' demands for the right to request tips as contrary to socialist ideals, and deplored the attacks against waitresses printed in press of the PSR. Later that year, he briefly edited the newspaper Social-democraţia ("Social-democracy"), but his health problems prevented him from continuing activism. One of his last public appearances was during the funeral of Mille in 1927, when he read a eulogy for his former companion. Ionescu died in Bucharest in July 1929, being interred in the city's Bellu cemetery.
