= Stephen Bartlett Lakeman =

British and Ottoman adventurer

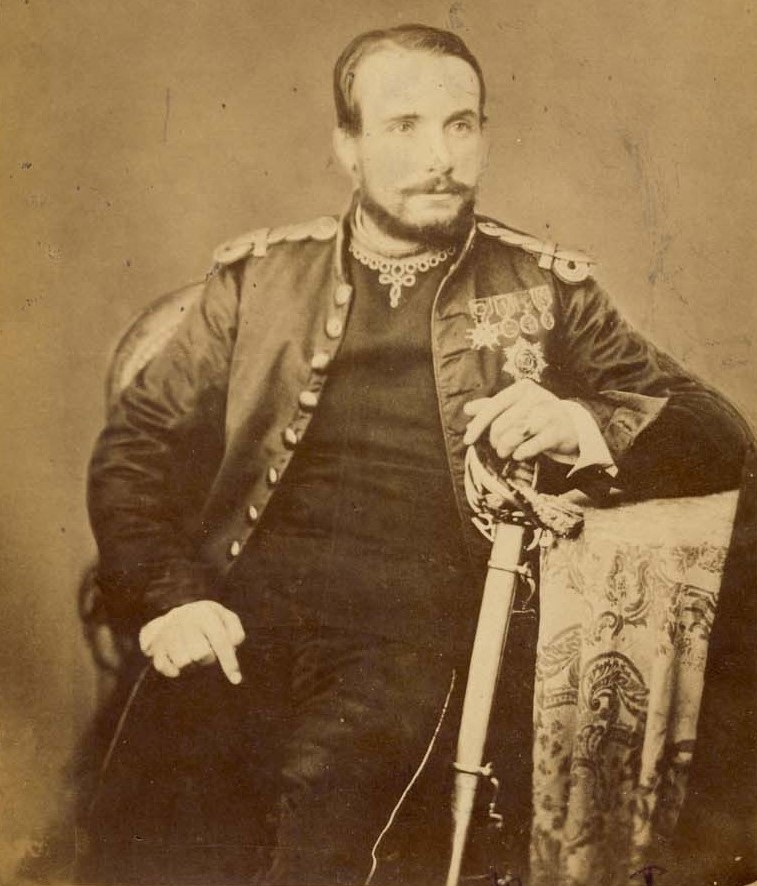
- 1880 photograph of Lakeman
- Born: 1823; Dartmouth, Devon
- Died: 1900 (aged 76–77); Bucharest, Kingdom of Romania
- Military career
- Allegiance: France (1847); United Kingdom (early 1850s); Ottoman Empire (1853 – 1856)
- Rank: Captain (British Army); Pasha (Ottoman Army)
- Nickname: Mazhar Paşa
- Conflicts: Xhosa Wars; Crimean War
- Awards: Knight Bachelor

Sir Stephen Bartlett Lakeman, also known as Mazhar Paşa (1823 – 1900) was an English-born British and Ottoman adventurer, soldier, and administrator. A mercenary and veteran of several wars, including the Xhosa and Crimean conflicts, he was assigned by the Ottoman military to Wallachia, where he later settled, becoming in time a supporter of the liberal current in Romania. He was an influential figure in local politics during the early 1870s, and a mediator between Ion Brătianu's government and the Porte at the start of the Russo-Turkish War of 1877–1878. Lakeman is also noted for having introduced Eastern European fish species to England.

== Biography ==
Born into a family of Dutch origins but settled in Devon where he was born at Dartmouth, he was a graduate of the Lycée Louis-le-Grand in Paris, France. Lakeman first saw action with the July Monarchy's armies resisting Abd al-Qadir's uprising in French Algeria. He later joined the British Army, left for the Cape Colony. A captain and commander of the Waterkloof Rangers in clashes with the Xhosa people, he was made a Knight Bachelor by Queen Victoria, during a ceremony at Windsor Castle (25 November 1853). According to his descendant Sybille Manu-Chrissoveloni, Lakeman had unsuccessfully tried to persuade British military officials to generalize the usage of khaki, replacing red coats in the standard uniforms; when his proposal was rejected, he established his own Waterkloof troops of volunteers (also known as the "Death Regiment"). An account of the formation of the Waterkloof Rangers appears in the historical novel Shark Alley: The Memoirs of a Penny-a-Liner by Stephen Carver.

Soon afterwards, he opted to join the Ottomans in their Crimean-centered conflict with the Russian Empire, becoming a binbaşı, and later a pasha (becoming known under his Turkish pseudonym Mazhar Paşa). When Russian troops evacuated Wallachia, Lakeman, who was serving under Omar Pasha, was appointed to a command position in the region, becoming police chief in Bucharest (September 1854). This occurred as the two Danubian Principalities came under Austrian supervision, a measure which was meant to create a buffer area, while allowing for an Ottoman garrison to be maintained.

Lakeman kept close contacts with the Wallachian nationalist circles, clashing with the Austrian governor, Johann Coronini-Cronberg, and becoming the subject of the latter's complaints to Omar Pasha and to Stratford Canning, the British Ambassador in Istanbul. During the same period, he met Maria Arion, belonging to a mixed Romanian-Greek family, whom he married in 1856.

In December 1854, Canning agreed to have Lakeman relieved from his post, and he was given instead military assignments on the Crimean front. As the war ended and Austrian troops withdrew, he returned to Bucharest and became the owner of several estates, establishing his main residence in a house next to Enei Church. In June 1857, Stephen Bartlett Lakeman met with Carroll Spence, the American Ambassador to the Ottoman Empire, who was visiting Wallachia. Spence asked Lakeman to mediate between him and Wallachia's Kaymakam, Alexandru II Ghica, after being offended that the latter had failed to receive him upon arrival. Lakeman visited the Kaymakam, who agreed to meet with the diplomatic envoy and apologize for the lack of courtesy.

Around 1864, on temporary return to England, he introduced there species of Wels catfish and tench, both native to the Danube basin.

The Lakemans' house, also known to Bucharesters as Mazhar Paşa, remained an important landmark and meeting spot for political figures after the creation of a unified Principality of Romania. Starting in 1875, Stephen Lakeman was a supporter of the radical groupings inside the liberal trend, while his house hosted anti-Conservative meetings which involved, among others, Ion and Dimitrie Brătianu, Ion Ghica, Mihail Kogălniceanu, Dimitrie Sturdza, C. A. Rosetti, Alexandru G. Golescu, and Nicolae Fleva. Negotiations between the moderate and radical faction resulted in the creation of the National Liberal Party, sealed by the so-called Coalition of Mazhar Paşa on 24 May 1875.

Shortly after the outbreak of the Russo-Turkish War of 1877–1878, he was present in Istanbul, as an unofficial representative of the Ion Brătianu cabinet. As Romania evaluated joining the Russian side in exchange for independence, Lakeman negotiated with Saffet Pasha, the Grand Vizier, arguing that the Bucharest authorities were to adopt neutrality and resist a Russian offensive in exchange for the official recognition of the name "Romania". He also called on the Ottoman Empire to offer assistance in the military effort. Despite the secret character of the proceedings, the Romanian press published allegations that Saffet had agreed to the demands, and that it had made other sizable concessions to the Brătianu government. Nevertheless, the negotiations' only visible outcome was the pledge of Ottoman authorities in Dobruja to aid Romania in the likelihood of an invasion – this offer was ignored by Brătianu, who also opted to reject approaching the Russian side until, in April 1877, Romania declared war on the Ottoman Empire.

According to memoirist James William Ozanne, who was visiting Romania during the period, Lakeman "made no secret of his disgust" in respect to the Russian-Romanian alliance. Following that moment, the pasha withdrew from political life, and returned to his native country. He died in Bucharest, in relative obscurity.

Stephen Lakeman had three children with Maria: two sons, George (whose daughter, Georgeta Lakeman, married the banker Nicolae Chrissoveloni in 1941) and Dan (who settled in Argentina), as well as a daughter, Celia. George Lakeman was naturalized Romanian in 1906.

In his March 2004 address to the University of KwaZulu-Natal, South African President Thabo Mbeki made ample mention of Lakeman's activities in the region. Quoting historian Noel Mostert, he indicated that the British commander had engaged in war crimes and atrocities: Lakeman was reported to have cut the throats of women and children prisoners with a sickle. Additionally, Lakeman himself admitted that he ordered his men to boil the severed heads of Xhosa people "for scientific interest". Volunteers of the Waterkloof unit were described by Lakeman as "brutally cruel […] killing without mercy all that came in their way when engaged in a fight, young as well as old, even braining little children".
