= Artur Stavri =

Romanian poet (1869–1928)

Artur Stavri (November 10, 1869 – May 10, 1928) was a Romanian poet.

Born in Botoșani, he studied at the National College in Iași and, from 1888, at the law faculty of Iași University. Active within the National Liberal Party, he served as prefect. Stavri wrote for numerous publications of various political orientations, including Adevărul, Contemporanul, Convorbiri Literare, Lumea ilustrată, Noua revistă română, Povestea vorbei, Revista nouă, România Literară, Sămănătorul, Vatra and Vieața. His pen names were Astar, A star, Coresi, A. Coresi and Sfâriac. He was an editor at Constantin Dobrogeanu-Gherea's Literatură și știință magazine, responsible for the literary section. Together with Ion Gorun, he published Pagini literare in 1899. He was a regular participant in Nicolae Beldiceanu's literary circle, together with Dimitrie Anghel and Arthur Gorovei. His books were Poesii. 1888-1894 (1894), De demult (poems, 1897), Pe-același drum (1900), Câteva clipe (poems, 1904) and Luminișuri (1910).
