= Gheorghe Brăescu =

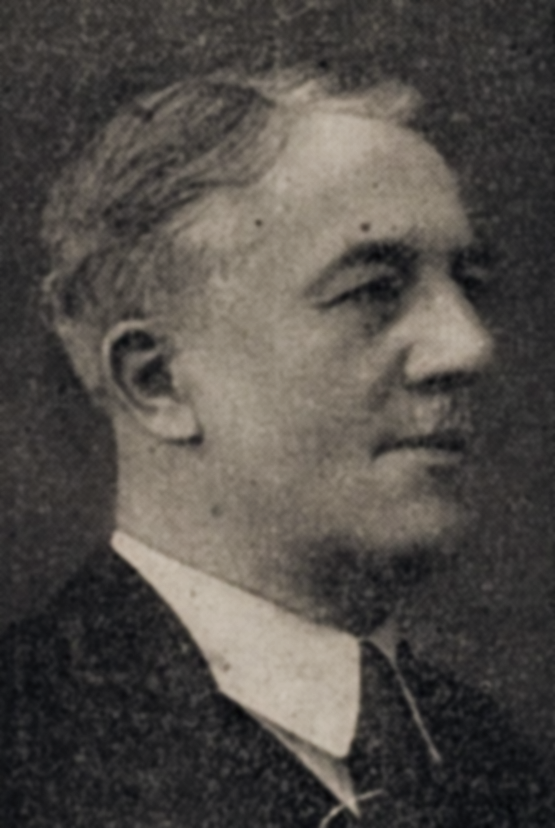
- Brăescu in 1926
- Born: January 30, 1871
- Died: March 15, 1949 (aged 78)
- Occupation: Writer

Gheorghe Brăescu (30 January 1871, Iaşi - 15 March 1949) was a Romanian writer.

== Works ==
=== Sketches ===
- Vine doamna şi domnul gheneral, 1919
- Maiorul Boţan, 1921
- Cum sunt ei, 1922
- Schiţe umoristice, 1922
- Doi vulpoi, 1923
- Schiţe vesele, 1924
- Nuvele, 1924
- Un scos din pepeni, 1926
- Schiţe alese, 1927
- Alte schiţe vesele, 1928
- La clubul decavaţilor, 1929

=== Novels ===
- Moş Belea, 1927
- Conaşii, 1935
- Primii şi ultimii paşi, 1939
- Margot, 1942

=== Theatre ===
- Ministrul

=== Memoirs ===
- Amintiri, 1939

=== Miscellaneous ===
- Educaţiunea socială a naţiunii armate, 1914
