= George D. Pallade =

Romanian politician

George D. Pallade (January 20, 1857–May 27, 1903) was a Romanian politician.

Born to a craftsman in Bârlad, Pallade graduated from the law faculty of the University of Bucharest in 1880. After working as an investigating judge in Bucharest, he began practicing as a lawyer. He taught political economy and law at the Free school of political science. His contributions appeared in a number of newspapers, including Românul and Naționalul, and he edited Gazeta poporului.

Pallade joined the National Liberal Party (PNL) in 1884. The same year, he was elected to the Chamber of Deputies. where he strongly supported C. A. Rosetti’s call for a single voter roll and press freedom. He then defected to Dumitru Brătianu’s Liberal Democratic Party, vigorously attacking the government of Ion C. Brătianu; the campaign peaked in 1885–1888, when he spoke out both in the Chamber and in the street. He was re-elected in 1888, 1891, and 1895.

In 1891, after the Brătianu brothers made peace, Pallade re-entered the PNL, being named to its executive committee. He found the party a useful vehicle for promoting his democratic ideals, in opposition to the conservative boyars, who feared his oratory. He held a number of ministerial portfolios under Dimitrie Sturdza: Agriculture, Industry, Commerce and Domains (October 1895–November 1896), Justice (January–October 1898), Finance (October 1898–March 1899 and February 1901–January 1902), and Interior (July–November 1902). During his second term as Finance Minister, he did not increase the state budget, in order to help Romania out of a severe economic crisis; and also supported protectionist measures against foreign capital.

In 1903, aged 46, Pallade was addressing a public gathering in Bârlad. As he said the word "talisman", he dropped dead. He was buried at Bellu Cemetery in Bucharest.
