= Lifespan timeline of presidents of the Senate of Romania =

This is a graphical lifespan timeline of presidents of the Senate of Romania. The presidents are listed in order of office.

== See also ==
- Senate of Romania
- President of the Senate of Romania
- Parliament of Romania
