= Coanda (disambiguation) =

Coanda or Coandă may refer to:

- Henri Coandă, a Romanian inventor
- Henri Coandă International Airport, a Romanian airport near Bucharest
- The Coandă effect in fluid dynamics
- Coandă-1910, an aircraft invented by Henri Coandă
- Coanda exhaust, an exhaust used in Formula 1
