= Wings Club =

Aviator club

The Wings Club, also known as the Wings Club of New York, is a social and professional club established for aviators, based in New York City. Founded in 1942 by a group of American aviation pioneers, it is known for its monthly lunches, annual dinners and special occasions at which talks are given on various aspects of aviation. The club gives out scholarships to aviation students, and selects individuals and organizations for recognition with the "Distinguished Achievement Award".

== History ==
The Wings Club was founded in New York City on May 15, 1942. It was housed within the Yale Club and served World War II pilots as a place of leisure and occasional living quarters. The first board of directors included Juan Trippe, the founder of Pan American World Airways, and World War I flying ace Eddie Rickenbacker. The first president was Caleb Bragg, a racer of automobiles and speedboats, aviation pioneer, and automotive inventor. Bragg had previously been a governor of the Aero Club of America. He was made president of the Wings Club despite suffering from a longterm illness which led to his death later the next year.

In the 1970s there were 1,500 members, including women for the first time. By 2011, membership had decreased to about 1,200. Members met at the Yale Club in the first few years, then in April 1946 the Wings Club relocated to the Biltmore Hotel where it stayed for 37 years. The Biltmore was torn down in 1981, so the club moved to nearby 52 Vanderbilt Avenue, a 20-story building opposite Grand Central Terminal. The Wings Club maintained a library, kitchen and dining hall on the 18th floor until 2002 when they stopped keeping their own quarters and instead met only at the Yale Club. In 2011, the club again moved into a permanent home, consisting of offices and a boardroom inside the MetLife Building, formerly the headquarters of Pan Am.

== Activities ==
Following the record-breaking 1945 Japan–Washington flight made by three U.S. Army Air Force generals in Boeing B-29 Superfortresses, the generals and their crews were invited to a Wings Club dinner held in their honor at the Yale Club. B-29 generals Curtis LeMay and Emmett O'Donnell Jr were able to attend, as were other USAAF generals such as Carl Andrew Spaatz and Jimmy Doolittle.

In 1956, Romanian inventor Henri Coandă spoke to the Wings Club about his early aircraft prototype, the Coandă-1910, ascribing to it novel features so that history would see it as a jet engine experiment. This was part of an extended effort by Coandă to redefine his legacy and frame his work as a major stepping stone of the jet age. Some aviators such as Martin Caidin believed him, but aviation historian Charles Harvard Gibbs-Smith, joined later by Frank H. Winter, disputed his claims, noting that his "turbo-propulseur" patent was suitable for either air flow or water flow—it certainly did not ignite fuel to create combustion in the exhaust airstream.

In early 1964, Joseph A. Walker, the chief test pilot for NASA, spoke about NASA's space program, especially about the Lunar Landing Research Vehicle for which he served as project manager. Walker expressed great confidence in the likelihood of a successful Moon landing but he died two years later in an air collision and never saw the program to completion.

Also in 1964, founding club member, former club president and retired USAF General Harold Ross Harris implemented the annual "Sight Lecture" series at which a leading aviation notable was to be invited to deliver a lecture adhering generally to "insights, foresights and hindsights" of aviation.

Beginning in 1975, the Wings Club selects one or more organizations or individuals each year to be honored with the "Distinguished Achievement Award", conferred at the annual dinner in October. The first awardee was aviation pioneer and USAF General Jimmy Doolittle.

Beginning in 2010, the Wings Club began to recognize organizations or individuals each year to be honored with the "Outstanding Aviator Award", presented at the annual meeting in March. The first recipients were the Tuskegee Airmen, the first African American pilots to serve in the US Army Air Corps. during World War II.

Since 2000, the club has awarded scholarships to aviation and aerospace students, beginning with Maurice Stanley who was studying aviation management at Dowling College, Long Island, New York.

== Guest speakers ==
- (1943) Gill Robb Wilson, President of the National Aeronautic Association
- (March 19, 1946) Carl Andrew Spaatz, "Future Use of Air Power"
- (1947) Dwight D. Eisenhower
- Bernt Balchen
- Alan Shepard
- Jimmy Doolittle
- Grover Loening
- Vincent Bendix
- Jerome Lederer
- Wernher von Braun
- (April 22, 1981) Senator Barry Goldwater
- (May 18, 1988) Neil A. Armstrong

== Notable members ==
- Gordon Bethune
- Caleb Bragg
- Robert Crandall
- Herb Kelleher
- Eddie Rickenbacker
- C. R. Smith
- Frederick W. Smith
- Juan Trippe

=== Honorary members ===
- Henry H. Arnold
- Jerome Clarke Hunsaker
- Fiorello LaGuardia
- L. Welch Pogue

== Sight Lecture Series ==
The first Sight Lecture was delivered by Igor Sikorsky on November 16, 1964, under the title "Recollections and Thoughts of a Pioneer". Sikorsky spoke primarily about the future role of the helicopter; he was certain that it would remain an important type of aircraft despite experiments with VTOL fixed-wing designs.

== See also ==
- Order of Daedalians
- Quiet Birdmen
