= Dimitrie Dobrescu =

Romanian politician

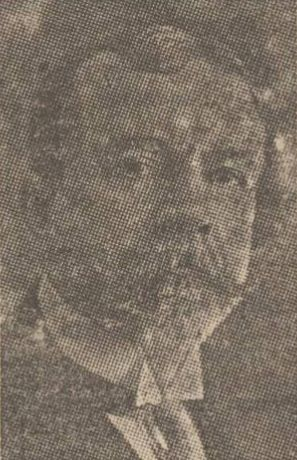

Mayor of Bucharest
- In office January 1911 – October 1912
- Monarch: Carol I of Romania
- Preceded by: Procopie Ioan Dumitrescu
- Succeeded by: Constantin Istrati

Minister of Justice
- In office 5 March 1918 – 4 June 1918
- Prime Minister: Alexandru Marghiloman
- Preceded by: Constantin Argetoianu
- Succeeded by: Ion Mitilineu

President of the Senate of Romania
- In office 4 June 1918 – 5 November 1918
- Monarch: Ferdinand I of Romania
- Preceded by: Emanoil Porumbaru
- Succeeded by: Paul Bujor

Personal details
- Born: 1852
- Died: 13 February 1934 (aged 81–82) Bucharest, Kingdom of Romania

Dimitrie Dobrescu (1852 – 13 February 1934) was a Romanian politician.

After studying law at the University of Paris, he returned home and entered the magistracy, becoming a judge on the Ilfov County tribunal in 1883. Entering the Conservative Party (PC), he was chosen general secretary of the State Domains in 1884. Dobrescu was an adviser at the Bucharest appeals court in 1890. The same year, he became general secretary in the Ministry of Agriculture, Industry, Commerce and Domains, remaining until 1895. Subsequently, he headed the tax and claims office in the Finance Ministry.

In 1891, Dobrescu followed dissident conservative members of Junimea into the new Constitutional Party, later returning to the PC. Elected deputy in 1911, he became a senator the following year. Concurrently, from 1911 to 1912, he was prefect of police and Mayor of Bucharest. During that time, he approved the development of the Filipescu plot (in what is now Sector 1), the most important pre-war private initiative that contributed to the expansion of the city towards the north. From March to June 1918, he was Justice Minister in the cabinet of Alexandru Marghiloman. Immediately thereafter, he became Senate President, serving until November. In 1925, he became an adviser at the Court of Audit.
