= Marghiloman cabinet =

Governor of Romania

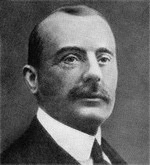
Alexandru Marghiloman

The cabinet of Alexandru Marghiloman was the government of Romania from 5 March to 23 October 1918.

== Composition ==
The ministers of the cabinet were as follows:

- President of the Council of Ministers:

- Alexandru Marghiloman (5 March - 23 October 1918)

- Vice President of the Council of Ministers:

- Constantin C. Arion (4 June - 23 October 1918)

- Minister of the Interior:

- Alexandru Marghiloman (5 March - 23 October 1918)

- Minister of Foreign Affairs:

- Constantin C. Arion (5 March - 23 October 1918)

- Minister of Finance:

- Mihai Seulescu (5 March - 23 October 1918)

- Minister of Justice:

- Dimitrie Dobrescu (5 March - 4 June 1918)
- Ion Mitilineu (4 June - 23 October 1918)

- Minister of Religious Affairs and Public Instruction:

- Simion Mehedinți (5 March - 23 October 1918)

- Minister of War:

- Gen. Constantin Hârjeu (5 March - 23 October 1918)

- Minister of Public Works:

- (interim) Gen. Constantin Hârjeu (5 - 25 March 1918)
- Nicolae Ghica-Comănești (25 March - 23 October 1918)

- Minister of Industry and Commerce:

- Constantin Meissner (5 March - 4 June 1918)
- Grigore G. Cantacuzino (4 June - 23 October 1918)

- Minister of Agriculture and Property:

- (interim) Alexandru Marghiloman (5 March - 4 June 1918)
- Constantin Garoflid (4 June - 23 October 1918)

Ministers without portfolio (for Bessarabia):

- Ion Inculeț (9 April - 23 October 1918)
- Daniel Ciugureanu (9 April - 23 October 1918)

Preceded by First Averescu cabinet	Cabinet of Romania; 5 March 1918 - 23 October 1918	Succeeded by Coandă cabinet
