= Nicolaescu =

Nicolaescu or Nicolăescu is a Romanian surname that may refer to:

- Constantin Nicolaescu
- Constantin I. Nicolaescu
- Constantin S. Nicolăescu-Plopșor
- Eugen Nicolăescu
- Ion Nicolăescu
- Sergiu Nicolaescu
