= Coandă cabinet =

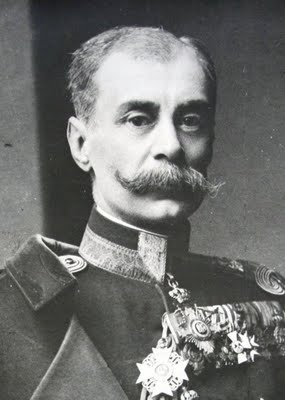
Constantin Coandă

The cabinet of Constantin Coandă was the government of Romania from 24 October to 28 November 1918. This period coincided with the closing days of World War I.

== Composition ==
The ministers of the cabinet were as follows:

- President of the Council of Ministers:

- Gen. Constantin Coandă (24 October - 28 November 1918)

- Minister of the Interior:

- Gen. Artur Văitoianu (24 October - 28 November 1918)

- Minister of Foreign Affairs:

- Gen. Constantin Coandă (24 October - 28 November 1918)

- Minister of Finance:

- (interim) Fotin Enescu (24 - 29 October 1918)
- Oscar Kiriacescu (29 October - 28 November 1918)

- Minister of Justice:

- (interim) Gen. Artur Văitoianu (24 - 28 October 1918)
- Dumitru Buzdugan (28 October - 28 November 1918)

- Minister of Religious Affairs and Public Instruction:

- Petru Poni (24 October - 28 November 1918)

- Minister of War:

- Gen. Eremia Grigorescu (24 October - 28 November 1918)

- Minister of Public Works:

- Anghel Saligny (24 October - 28 November 1918)

- Minister of Industry and Commerce:

- (interim) Gen. Eremia Grigorescu (24 - 29 October 1918)
- Alexandru Cottescu (29 October - 28 November 1918)

- Minister of Agriculture and Property:

- Fotin Enescu (24 October - 28 November 1918)

Ministers without portfolio (for Bessarabia):

- Ion Inculeț (24 October - 28 November 1918)
- Daniel Ciugureanu (24 October - 28 November 1918)

Preceded by Marghiloman cabinet	Cabinet of Romania; 24 October 1918 - 28 November 1918	Succeeded by Fifth Ion I. C. Brătianu cabinet
