= President of the Senate of Romania =

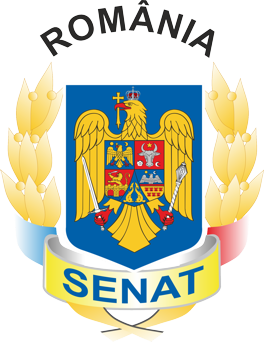
- Coat of arms of the Senate
- Incumbent; Mircea Abrudean since 24 June 2025
- Term length: 4 years
- Inaugural holder: Nifon Rusailă (1864); Alexandru Bârlădeanu (1990)
- Formation: 1864; 1990
- Succession: First

The president of the Senate of Romania is the senator elected to preside over the Senate meetings. The president of the Senate is also the president of the Standing Bureau of the Senate, and the first person in the presidential line of succession.

== Election ==
The president of the Senate is elected by secret ballot with the majority of votes from the senators. If none of the candidates obtains the necessary votes, the first two compete again, and the one with most of the votes wins.

== Role ==
- Calls the Senate in session (ordinary or extraordinary);
- Presides the Senate meetings, assisted by two secretaries;
- Represents the Senate in the relation with the President, the Chamber of Deputies, the Government, Constitutional Court
- Represents the Senate in the foreign relations;
- Succeeds (ad interim) the president if the latter resigns, is suspended, incapacitated or dies in office. (They continue to be president of the Senate during the ad-interim presidency of the country. They act as president until a new president is elected.)

== History ==
=== 1864–1866 ===
Between 3 July 1864 and 1 June 1866 the Upper House of the Legislative was called Corpul Ponderator. Members were nominated by the domnitor, based on the proposals of the counties.

=== 1866–1946 ===
The upper house was called Senat or Camera Senatului. Most of the Senators were elected, some were senators by right (senatori de drept), as established by the 1866 Constitution. Voters and members had to be at least 40 years of age, except the heir to the throne, that was senator at 18 years, and allowed to vote in the Senate at 21.

=== 1946–1989 ===
In 1946 elections were called only for the Assembly of Deputies (Adunarea Deputaţilor), as the 1923 Constitution was re-empowered with some modifications (including the suspension of the Senate). After the overthrow of the king and the establishment of the communist republic, the upper house was dissolved and disbanded.

=== 1990–present ===
The upper house is called Senat and is headed by a president.

== List of officeholders ==
Ad interim (acting) officeholders are denoted by italics. The Rule of the Senate states that at the first standing of the house, the meeting is headed by the eldest senator and helped by the youngest senator. Those bear the title of Interim President of the Senate, and, as their term is very short (one or two days), they are not listed. The interim officeholders listed have hold the office in different circumstances and for a longer time (i.e. than one or two days).

They were actually Vice Presidents standing as caretaker President during a vacancy. The caretaker Vice Presidents during the two impeachments of Traian Băsescu in April–May 2007 (Doru Ioan Tărăcilă [ro]) and in June–July 2012 (Petru Filip) are also listed in the table below.

The political stance of presidents of the upper house prior to the development of a modern party system is given by the following key/legend:

| C (Conservative) | MC (Moderate Conservative) |
| RL (Radical Liberal) | ML (Moderate Liberal) |

The political stance of presidents of the upper house after the development of a modern party system is given by the following key/legend:

| PNL = National Liberal Party (historical)/(contemporary) | PC = Conservative Party |
| PNR = Romanian National Party | PP = People's Party |
| PCD = Conservative-Democratic Party | PNȚ = National Peasants' Party |
| PND = Democratic Nationalist Party | PNC = National Christian Party |
| FRN = National Renaissance Front (from 1940 PN; Party of the Nation) | FP = Ploughmen's Front |
| PMR = Romanian Workers' Party (from 1965 PCR; Romanian Communist Party) | FSN = National Salvation Front |
| PDSR = Party of Social Democracy in Romania (from 2001 PSD; Social Democratic Party) | PNȚCD = Christian Democratic National Peasants' Party |
| PSDR = Romanian Social Democratic Party | PDL = Democratic Liberal Party (until 2008 PD; Democratic Party) |
USR PLUS/USR = Save Romania Union - Freedom, Unity and Solidarity Party/Save Romania Union
| Mil. = Military | Ind. = Independent |

| # | Name | Portrait | Birth–Death | Took office | Left office | Party |
|---|---|---|---|---|---|---|
Corpul Ponderator 1864–1866
| 1 | Metropolitan-primate Nifon Rusailă | | 1789–1875 | 6 December 1864 | 1 June 1866 | Ind. |
Senate 1866–1947
| (1) | Metropolitan-primate Nifon Rusailă | | 1789–1875 | 1 June 1866 | 6 June 1868 | Ind. |
| 2 | Ştefan Golescu | | 1809–1874 | 6 September 1868 | 15 November 1868 | RL |
| 3 | Nicolae Golescu | | 1810–1877 | 18 November 1868 | 9 July 1869 | RL |
| 4 | Alexandru Plagino | | 1821–1894 | 2 September 1869 | 4 March 1871 | MC |
| (1) | Metropolitan-primate Nifon Rusailă | | 1789–1875 | 4 March 1871 | 5 May 1875 | Ind. |
| 5 | Metropolitan-primate Calinic Miclescu | | 1822–1886 | 9 June 1875 | 25 March 1879 | Ind. |
| 6 | Constantin Bosianu | | 1815–1882 | 29 May 1879 | 15 November 1879 | PNL |
| 7 | Dimitrie Ghica | | 1816–1897 | 17 November 1879 | 8 September 1888 | PNL |
| 8 | Ioan Emanoil Florescu | | 1819–1893 | 4 November 1888 | 7 December 1889 | PC |
| 9 | Nicolae Kretzulescu | | 1812–1900 | 13 December 1889 | 9 June 1890 | PC |
| (8) | Ioan Emanoil Florescu | | 1819–1893 | 17 November 1890 | 21 February 1891 | PC |
| 10 | Constantin Boerescu | | 1836–1908 | 1 March 1891 | 11 December 1891 | PC |
| 11 | Gheorghe Grigore Cantacuzino | | 1833–1913 | 25 February 1892 | 24 October 1895 | PC |
| 12 | Dimitrie Ghica | | 1816–1897 | 9 December 1895 | 15 February 1897 | PNL |
| 13 | Dimitrie Alexandru Sturdza | | 1833–1914 | 20 February 1897 | 31 March 1897 | PNL |
| 14 | Eugeniu Stătescu | | 1836–1905 | 31 March 1897 | 18 November 1897 | PNL |
| 15 | Nicolae Gane | | 1838–1916 | 18 November 1897 | 21 April 1899 | PNL |
| (10) | Constantin Boerescu | | 1836–1908 | 13 June 1899 | 14 February 1901 | PC |
| (14) | Eugeniu Stătescu | | 1836–1905 | 24 March 1901 | 15 November 1902 | PNL |
| 16 | Petre S. Aurelian | | 1833–1909 | 16 November 1902 | 23 December 1904 | PNL |
| (10) | Constantin Boerescu | | 1836–1908 | 25 February 1905 | 26 April 1907 | PC |
| (16) | Petre S. Aurelian | | 1833–1909 | 9 June 1907 | 24 January 1909 | PNL |
| 17 | Constantin Budișteanu | | 1838–1911 | 28 January 1909 | 10 January 1911 | PNL |
| (11) | Gheorghe Grigore Cantacuzino | | 1833–1913 | 10 March 1911 | 23 March 1913 | PC |
| 18 | Theodor Rosetti | | 1837–1932 | 27 March 1913 | 3 July 1913 | PC |
| 19 | Ioan Lahovary | | 1844–1915 | 3 July 1913 | 11 January 1914 | PC |
| 20 | Basile M. Missir | | 1843–1929 | 21 February 1914 | 9 December 1916 | PNL |
| 21 | Emanoil Porumbaru | | 1845–1921 | 9 December 1916 | 25 April 1918 | PNL |
| 22 | Dimitrie Dobrescu | | 1852–1934 | 4 June 1918 | 5 November 1918 | PCP |
| 23 | Paul Bujor | | 1862–1952 | 28 November 1919 | 26 March 1920 | PȚ |
| 24 | Constantin Coandă | | 1857–1932 | 22 June 1920 | 22 January 1922 | PP |
| 25 | Mihail Pherekyde | | 1842–1926 | 31 March 1922 | 24 January 1926 | PNL |
| 26 | Constantin I. Nicolaescu | | 1861–1945 | 3 February 1926 | 27 March 1926 | PNL |
| (24) | Constantin Coandă | | 1857–1932 | 18 July 1926 | 5 June 1927 | PP |
| 27 | Constantin I. Nicolaescu | | 1861–1945 | 18 July 1927 | 10 November 1928 | PNL |
| 28 | Traian Bratu | | 1875–1940 | 23 December 1928 | 30 April 1931 | PNȚ |
| 29 | Mihail Sadoveanu | | 1880–1961 | 18 June 1931 | 10 June 1932 | Ind. |
| 30 | Neculai Costăchescu | | 1876–1939 | 4 August 1932 | 18 November 1933 | PNȚ |
| 31 | Leonte Moldovan | | 1865–1943 | 10 February 1934 | 15 November 1935 | PNL |
| 32 | Constantin Dimitriu-Dovlecel | | 1872–1945 | 15 November 1935 | 15 November 1936 | PNL |
| 33 | Alexandru Lapedatu | | 1876–1950 | 16 November 1936 | 20 March 1937 | PNL |
| 34 | Nicolae Iorga | | 1871–1940 | 9 June 1939 | 13 June 1939 | Ind. |
| 35 | Constantin Argetoianu | | 1871–1955 | 15 June 1939 | 5 September 1940 | FNR/PN |
Senate since 1990
| 36 | Alexandru Bârlădeanu | | 1911–1997 | 18 June 1990 | 16 October 1992 | FSN |
| 37 | Oliviu Gherman | | 1930–2020 | 22 October 1992 | 22 November 1996 | FDSN/PDSR |
| 38 | Petre Roman | | 1946– | 27 November 1996 | 22 December 1999 | PD |
| 39 | Mircea Ionescu-Quintus | | 1917–2017 | 4 February 2000 | 30 November 2000 | PNL |
| 40 | Nicolae Văcăroiu | | 1943– | 15 December 2000 | 30 November 2004 | PDSR/PSD |
| 40 | Nicolae Văcăroiu | | 1943– | 19 December 2004 | 14 October 2008 | PSD |
| — | Doru Ioan Tărăcilă (acting) | | 1951– | 14 October 2008 | 28 October 2008 | PSD |
| 41 | Ilie Sârbu | | 1950– | 28 October 2008 | 13 December 2008 | PSD |
| 42 | Mircea Geoană | | 1958– | 19 December 2008 | 23 November 2011 | PSD |
| — | Petru Filip (acting) | | 1955– | 23 November 2011 | 28 November 2011 | PDL |
| 43 | Vasile Blaga | | 1956– | 28 November 2011 | 3 July 2012 | PDL |
| 44 | Crin Antonescu | | 1959– | 3 July 2012 | 19 December 2012 | PNL |
| 44 | Crin Antonescu | | 1959– | 19 December 2012 | 4 March 2014 | PNL |
| — | Cristian Dumitrescu (acting) | | 1955– | 5 March 2014 | 10 March 2014 | PSD |
| 45 | Călin Popescu-Tăriceanu | | 1952– | 10 March 2014 | 21 December 2016 | Ind./PLR/ALDE |
| 45 | Călin Popescu-Tăriceanu | | 1952– | 21 December 2016 | 2 September 2019 | ALDE |
| — | Șerban Valeca (acting) | | 1956–2022 | 2 September 2019 | 10 September 2019 | PSD |
| 46 | Teodor Meleșcanu | | 1941– | 10 September 2019 | 3 February 2020 | Ind. with PSD support |
| — | Titus Corlățean (acting) | | 1968– | 3 February 2020 | 9 April 2020 | PSD |
| — | Robert Cazanciuc (acting) | | 1971– | 9 April 2020 | 21 December 2020 | PSD |
| 47 | Anca Dragu | | 1972– | 21 December 2020 | 23 November 2021 | USR PLUS (Note: PLUS member)/USR |
| 48 | Florin Cîțu | | 1972– | 23 November 2021 | 29 June 2022 | PNL |
| — | Alina Gorghiu (acting) | | 1978– | 29 June 2022 | 13 June 2023 | PNL |
| 49 | Nicolae Ciucă | | 1967– | 13 June 2023 | 23 December 2024 | PNL |
| 50 | Ilie Bolojan | | 1969– | 23 December 2024 | 23 June 2025 | PNL |
| 51 | Mircea Abrudean | | 1984– | 24 June 2025 | Incumbent | PNL |
