= Boerescu =

Boerescu is a Romanian surname. Notable people with the surname include:

- Constantin Boerescu (nicknamed Costache Boerescu; 1836–1908), Wallachian-born Romanian lawyer and politician.
- Vasile Boerescu (1830–1883), journalist, lawyer and Romanian politician
