= 2021 President of the Senate of Romania election =

- 23 November 2021
- Turnout: 91.17%
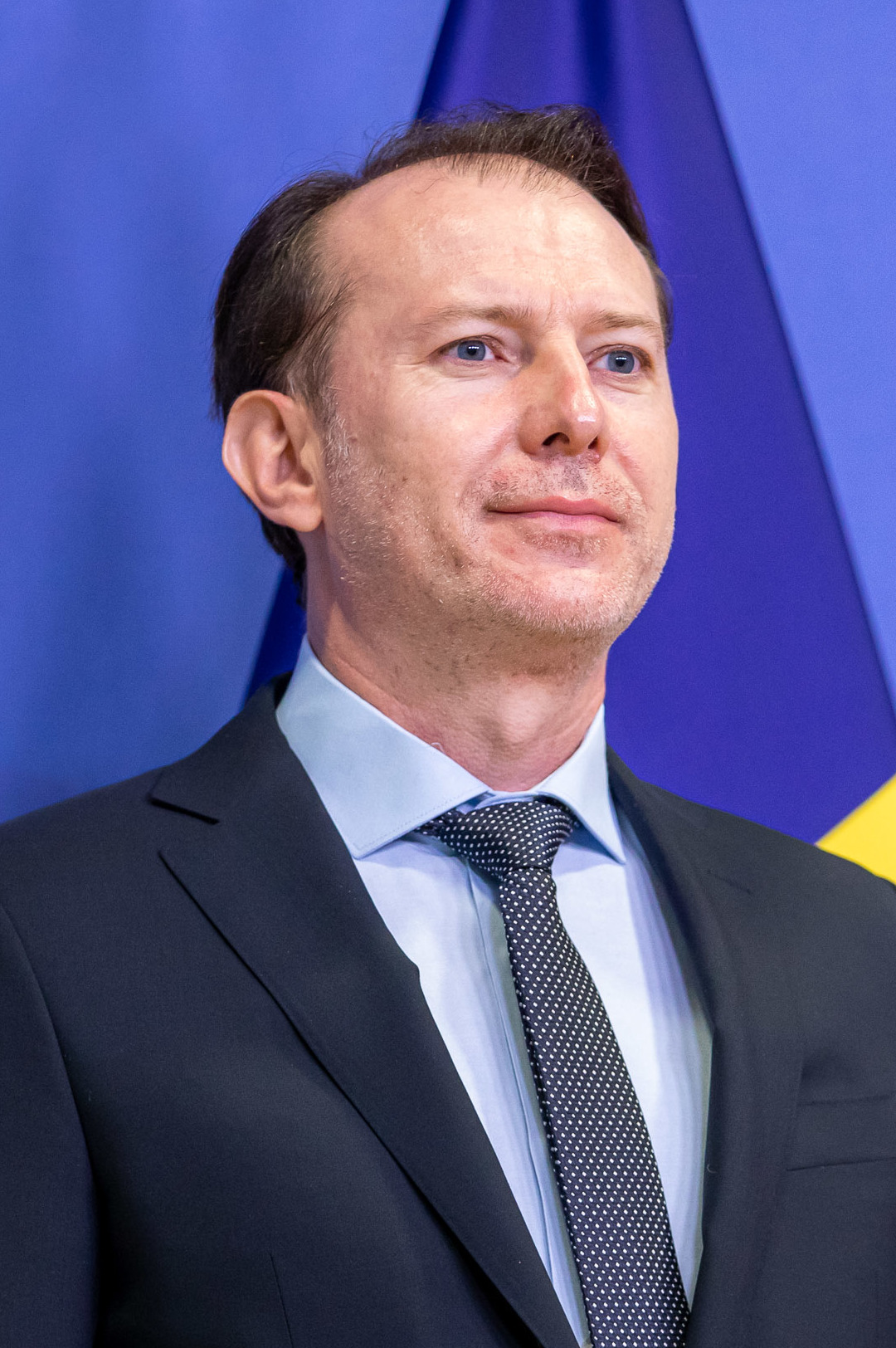

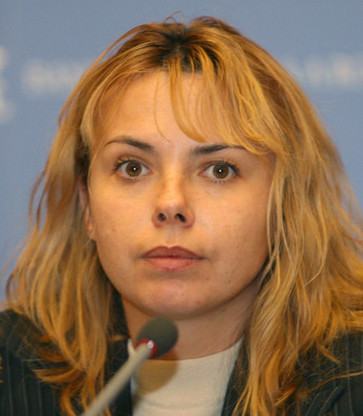
Nominee	Florin Cîțu	Anca Dragu
Party	PNL	USR
Popular vote	82	25
Percentage	76.64%	23.36%
President of the Senate of Romania before election
Anca Dragu
USR
Elected President of the Senate of Romania
Florin Cîțu
PNL

The President of the Senate of Romania is the senator elected to preside over the Senate meetings. The president of the Senate is also the president of the Standing Bureau of the Senate and the first person in the presidential line of succession.

== Electoral system ==
The President of the Senate is elected by secret ballot with the majority of votes from the Senators. If none of the candidates obtains the necessary votes, the first two compete again, and the one with most of the votes wins.

== Results ==
Florin Cîțu defeated Anca Dragu in the November 2021 elections for Senate President.

Candidate	Party	Support	Votes	%
Florin Cîțu	PNL	PSD, UDMR/RMDSZ	82	60.29%
Anca Dragu	USR	—N/a	25	18.38%
Abstentions	—N/a	AUR, FD	17	12.50%
Abstentions	—N/a	—N/a	12	8.83%
Total			136	100.00%
