= Emanoil Porumbaru =

Romanian politician

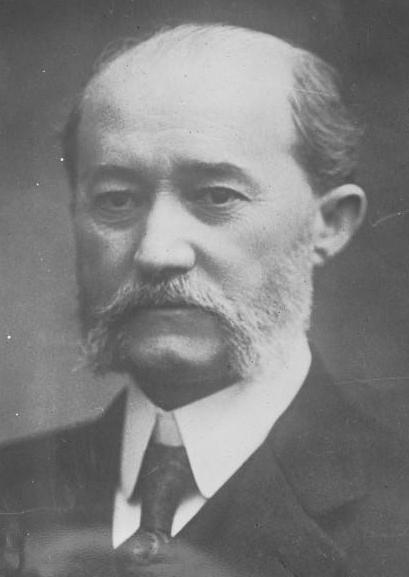

Minister of Foreign Affairs of Romania
- In office 4 January 1914 – 7 December 1916
- Monarchs: Carol I of Romania; Ferdinand I of Romania
- Preceded by: Titu Maiorescu
- Succeeded by: Ion I. C. Brătianu

President of the Senate of Romania
- In office 9 December 1916 – 25 April 1918
- Monarch: Ferdinand I of Romania
- Preceded by: Basile M. Missir
- Succeeded by: Dimitrie Dobrescu

Personal details
- Born: 1845 Bucharest, Wallachia
- Died: 11 October 1921 (aged 75–76) Bucharest, Kingdom of Romania

Emanoil Porumbaru (1845 – 11 October 1921) was a Romanian politician who served as the Minister of Foreign Affairs of Romania from 4 January 1914 until 7 December 1916 under the reign of Romanian kings Carol I and Ferdinand, and as President of the Senate of Romania from 9 December 1916 until 25 April 1918.

He died on 11 October 1921 in Bucharest. A street in Sector 1 of Bucharest is named after Porumbaru.

== See also ==
- Foreign relations of Romania
