= Constantin I. Nicolaescu =

Romanian politician

Constantin Nicolaescu

President of the Senate of Romania
- In office 3 February 1926 – 27 March 1926
- Monarch: Ferdinand I
- Preceded by: Mihail Pherekyde
- Succeeded by: Constantin Coandă

President of the Senate of Romania
- In office 18 July 1927 – 10 November 1928
- Monarchs: Ferdinand I Michael I
- Preceded by: Constantin Coandă
- Succeeded by: Traian Bratu

Personal details
- Born: 3 February 1861 Târgoviște, United Principalities of Wallachia and Moldavia
- Died: 20 May 1945 (aged 84) Târgoviște, Kingdom of Romania

Constantin I. Nicolaescu (3 February 1861 – 20 May 1945) was a Romanian politician.

== Biography ==
Born in Târgoviște, he attended Saint Sava National College in Bucharest, followed by the University of Bucharest. There, he obtained a law degree, subsequently working as a magistrate and lawyer. A member of the National Liberal Party, he was first elected deputy in 1892. Nicolaescu was prefect of Dâmbovița County from 1897 to 1899, and again in 1901. He was secretary general in the Interior Ministry from 1902 to 1904, and again from 1907 to 1908. After leaving the ministry, he became head of Casa rurală bank. In 1914, he was elected senator. In 1920, he was vice president of the agrarian committee, shortly before land reform was carried out. Nicolaescu twice served as Senate President: February to March 1926 and July 1927 to November 1928.
