= Coandă-1910 =

Aircraft

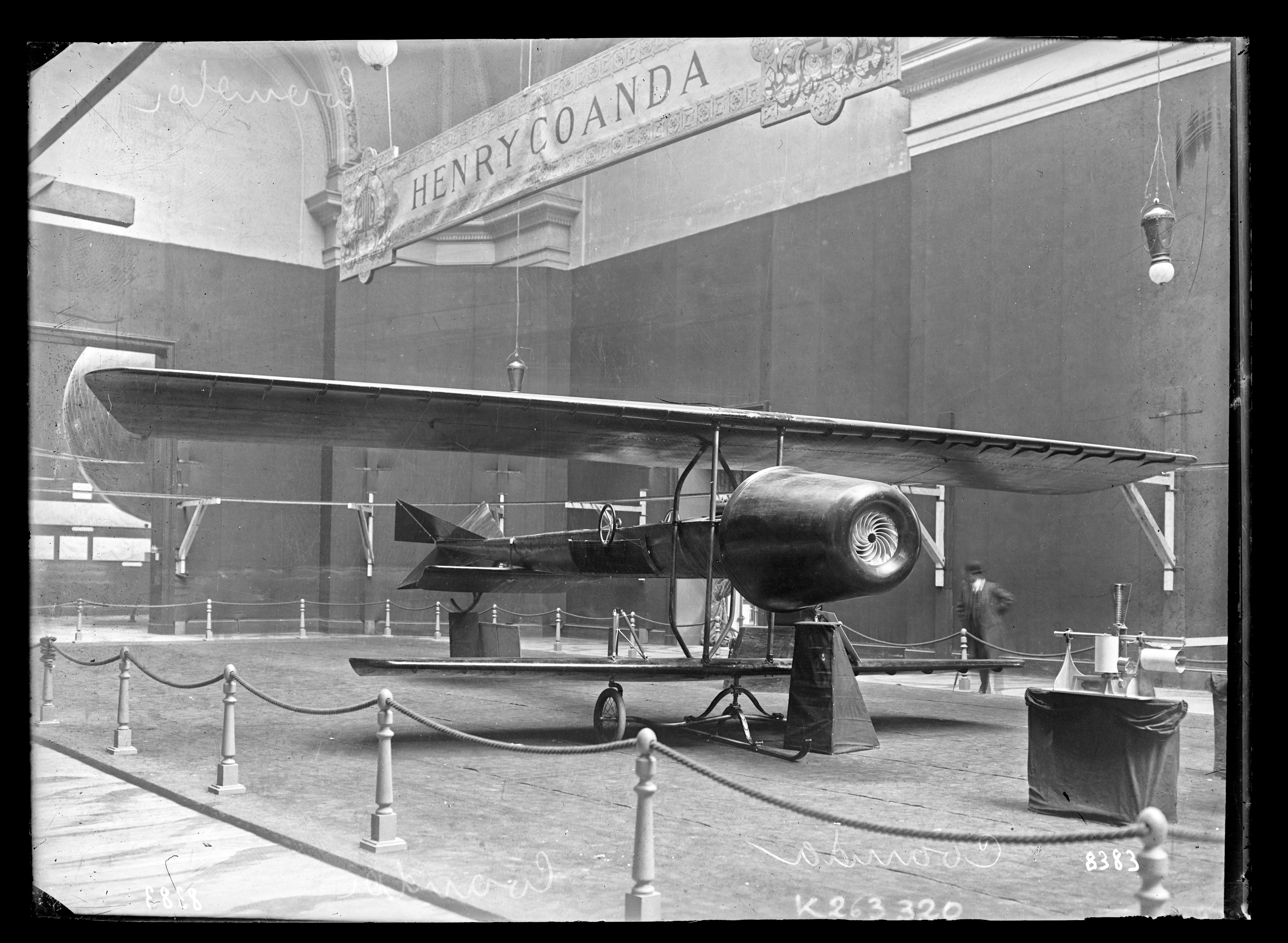
- Coandă-1910 at the 1910 Paris Flight Salon

General information
- Type: Experimental
- National origin: Romania/France
- Manufacturer: Henri Coandă
- Number built: 1

The Coandă-1910, designed by Romanian inventor Henri Coandă, was an unconventional sesquiplane aircraft powered by a ducted fan. Called the "turbo-propulseur" by Coandă, its experimental engine consisted of a conventional piston engine driving a multi-bladed centrifugal blower which exhausted into a duct. The unusual aircraft attracted attention at the Second International Aeronautical Exhibition in Paris in October 1910, being the only exhibit without a propeller, but the aircraft was not displayed afterwards, and it fell from public awareness. Coandă used a similar turbo-propulseur to drive a snow sledge, but he did not develop it further for aircraft.

Decades later, after the practical demonstration of motorjets and turbojets, Coandă began to tell various conflicting stories about how his early experiments were precursors to the jet, even that his turbo-propulseur was the first motorjet engine with fuel combustion in the airstream. He also claimed to have made a single brief flight in December 1910, crashing just after takeoff, the aircraft being destroyed by fire. Two aviation historians countered Coandă's version of events, saying there was no proof that the engine had combustion in the airstream, and no proof that the aircraft ever flew. In 1965, Coandă brought drawings forward to prove his claim of combustion ducting, but these were shown to be reworked, differing substantially from the originals. Many aviation historians were dismissive, saying that Coandă's turbo-propulseur design involved a weak stream of "plain air", not a powerful jet of air expanding from fuel combustion.

In 2010, based on the notion that Coandă invented the first jet, the centennial of the jet aircraft was celebrated in Romania. A special coin and stamp were issued, and construction began on a working replica of the aircraft. At the European Parliament, an exhibition commemorated the building and testing of the Coandă-1910.

== Early developments ==
Coandă was interested in achieving reactive propelled flight as early as 1905, conducting tests of rockets attached to model aircraft at the Romanian Army arsenal in Bucharest. In secret, at Spandau in Germany, Coandă successfully tested a flying machine equipped with a single tractor propeller, and two counter-rotating propellers providing lift, powered by a 50-horsepower (37 kW) Antoinette engine. Positioned along the fuselage centreline, the smaller rear lift propeller was mounted vertically, while the larger front one was inclined slightly forwards at 17 degrees. According to later claims, Coandă tested the aircraft at Cassel, witnessed by the Chancellor of the German Empire Bernhard von Bülow. It was around this time that Coandă's interest in jet propulsion began, claiming that the aircraft and a jet-propelled model were displayed in December 1907 at the Sporthalle indoor sports arena in Berlin. Coandă continued his studies at Liège, Belgium, where with his roommate and friend Giovanni Battista Caproni he built the Coandă-Caproni box glider, based on the plans of gliders designed by Otto Lilienthal and Octave Chanute which he previously studied at Charlottenburg and Spandau. In 1909 he was employed as technical director of the Liège-Spa Aeroclub, and at the end of that year, with the help of car manufacturer Joachim he built the Coandă-Joachim glider. Caproni was present when the glider was flown at Spa-Malchamps, Belgium.

== 1910s ==
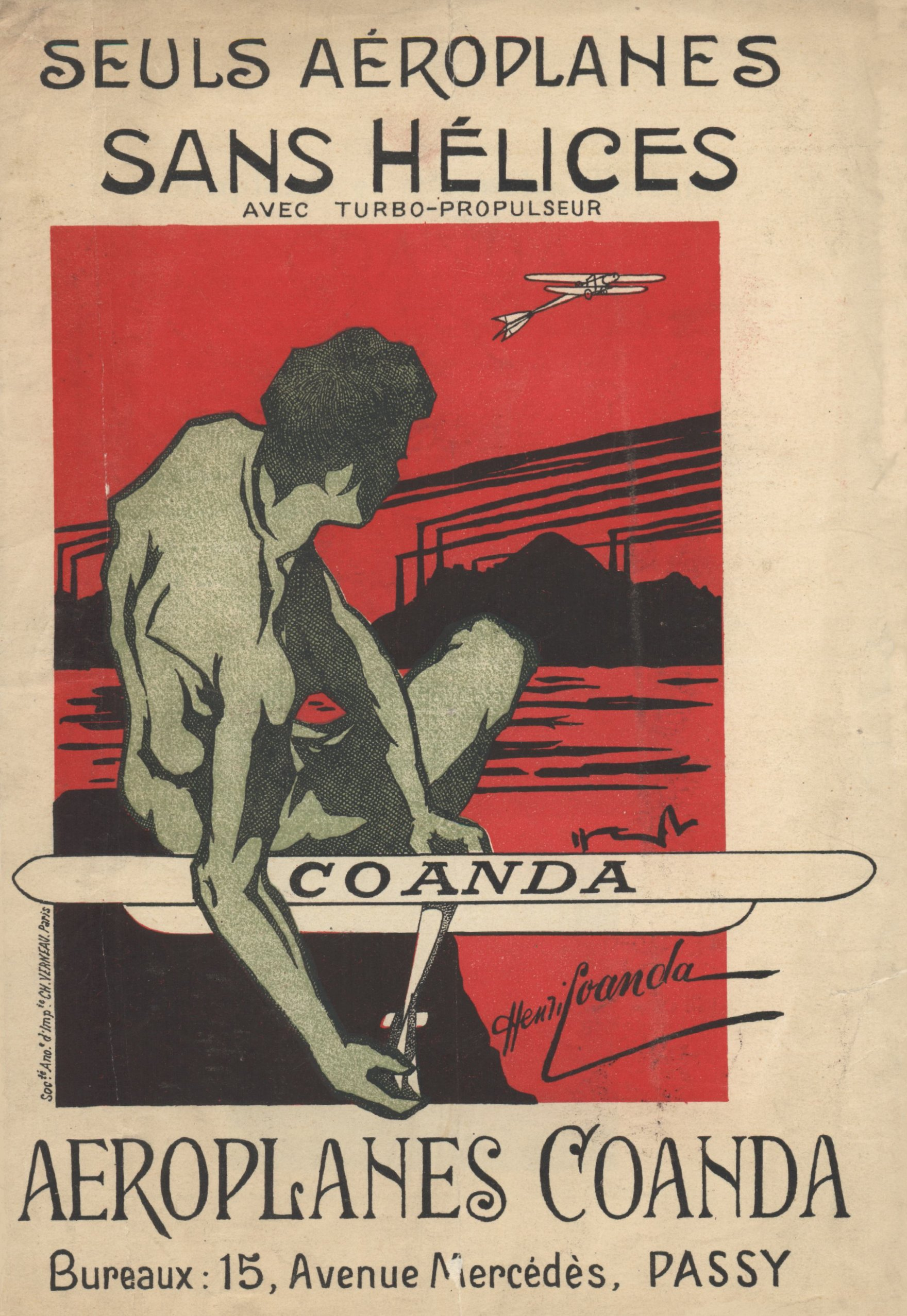
"The Only Aeroplanes Without Propellers". This promotional brochure was available at the Paris salon in 1910.

With the opening of the École supérieure d'aéronautique et de constructions mécaniques on 15 November 1909, Coandă moved to Paris. As a continuation of his Belgian experiments, and especially looking for a way to test wing aerofoils at higher speeds, he contacted Ernest Archdeacon, the co-founder of L'Aero-Club de France, who in turn directed Coandă to Gustav Eiffel and Paul Painlevé. With their assistance, he gained approval to test different wing configurations and air resistance on a platform built by Eiffel at the front of a locomotive on the North of France railway. In March, he started flying lessons at Reims in a Hanriot monoplane.

Helped by his schoolfriend Cammarotta-AdornoIn, Coandă started to build his aircraft and the unusual powerplant in a workshop in the courtyard of his house where he tested the thrust of the powerplant on a dynamometer; these are described in detail in the April 1910 edition of La Technique Aéronautique. He filed for several patents for the mechanism and aircraft on 30 May 1910, with later additions to the existing patents.

Coandă exhibited the aircraft at the Second International Aeronautical Exhibition held from 15 October to 2 November 1910. Together with Henri Fabre's Hydravion, the first floatplane, Coandă's aircraft and devices used for aerodynamic experiments were placed "in solitary state" in an upstairs gallery, separated from the more usual types of aircraft on the main exhibition floor.

The aircraft's construction was a novelty for the time. In contrast to the monoplane described in the July 1910 patent application, it was a sesquiplane which complicated the construction, but in return solved lateral stability control issues. The cantilevered wings were held in place at three points by tubular steel struts without any bracing from flying wires. According to Coandă's description the wings were built with metal spars, but existing photographs of the construction show a completely wooden internal structure. The trailing edges of the upper wing could be twisted separately or together for lateral control or braking during landing, and were controlled by pedals in the two-seat open cockpit. The fuselage, painted reddish-brown and highly polished, was described by The Technical World magazine as having a framework of steel, though the construction photographs indicate that it had a wooden framework. This was triangular in cross-section with convex ribs edged with strips of steel, and strengthened with a covering of heat-shaped moulded plywood. Tubular radiators for engine cooling were located on either side of the cockpit. The vertical struts from the wings were secured to the fuselage with steel collars fixed with screws. The fuselage terminated in a cruciform empennage with control surfaces at 45° angles to vertical and horizontal. Four triangular surfaces at the rear of the tail were controlled using a pair of large Antoinette VII-style steering wheels mounted outside of the cockpit, one on each side, and were used for pitch and directional control. It was an early instance of what are now known as ruddervators. Forward of the tail was a small horizontal stabiliser. The fuel tank was located in the fuselage between the engine and the cockpit.

The most remarkable feature of the aircraft was its engine. Instead of a propeller, a 50 hp (37 kW) inline water-cooled internal combustion engine built by Pierre Clerget at the Clément-Bayard workshop with funding from L'Aero-Club de France, placed in the forward section of the fuselage drove a rotary compressor through a 1:4 gearbox (1,000 rpm on the Clerget turned the compressor at 4,000 rpm), which drew air in from the front and expelled it rearward under compression and with added heat. The compressor, with a diameter of 50 centimetres (20 in), was located within a cowling at the front of the fuselage. According to later Coandă descriptions, cast aluminium components were also made by Clerget to create an engine with a weight of 1.8 kilograms per kilowatt (2.9 lb/hp) – equivalent to a power-to-weight ratio of 0.59 kilowatts per kilogram (0.36 hp/lb), a considerable achievement at the time.

Coandă's 1910s-era patents describe the inline piston engine's exhaust gases as being routed through heating channels or heat exchangers in contact with the central air flow, then sucked into the compressor inlet to reduce back-pressure on the engine while adding more heat and mass to the airflow. The turbo-propulseur was claimed to be capable of generating 2.20 kilonewtons (220 kgf; 490 lbf) of thrust. The powerplant was referred to in reports at the time by different terms: a turbine without propellers, turbo-propulseur, ducted fan or a suction turbine.

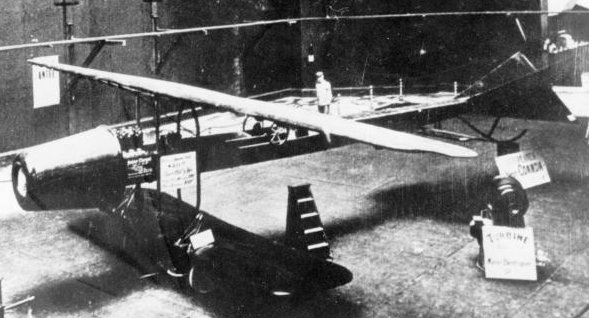
An overhead view, showing the Clerget engine's four upright cylinders aft of the rotary compressor. Upper and lower wings are mounted on steel tubes extending from the fuselage. A man stands in the fuselage near two Antoinette VII-style trim and steering wheels.

Aviation reporters from The Aero and La Technique Aeronautique were doubtful that the engine could provide sufficient thrust. The engine was noted in The Aero, reprinted in Aircraft, as being "of remarkably small proportions in relation to the size of the machine." The writer said the turbo-propulseur was "claimed to give an enormous wind velocity", but the intake area seemed too small to produce the stated thrust, and that "it also appears as if enormous power would be necessary to drive it", more than supplied by the Clerget.

The Coandă-1910 was reportedly sold to Charles Weymann in October 1910. A daily newspaper from Bucharest wrote in 1910 that the aircraft was constructed in Clerget's workshops and that it "will fly in 6–7 weeks near Paris, piloted by Weymann, one of the pilots celebrated at the Rennes aviation meeting." Another Bucharest newspaper listed the aircraft in November as "sold twice-over". It may be that Weymann expressed his willingness to buy the aircraft once tests had been carried out.

At the exhibition, reaction among observers was mixed. Some doubted the aircraft would fly, and focused on more likely machines such as the Sloan, the Voisin, or Louis Paulhan's design. Others gave special notice to the Coandă-1910, calling it original and ingenious. The reporter from La Technique Aeronautique wrote, "In the absence of definitive trials, permitting the precise yield of this machine, it is without doubt premature to say it will supersede the propeller ... the tentative is interesting and we watch it closely." The official exhibition report ignored the turbo-propulseur engine and instead described Coandă's novel wing design, and the unusual empennage. On 15 November 1910, L'Aérophile wrote that if the machine were ever to develop as the inventor hoped, it would be "a beautiful dream".

Frontal view photograph. The horizontal stabiliser obscures the lower part of the X-shaped empennage. A second turbo-propulseur is displayed on a stand at the right.

After the exhibition the aircraft was moved to a Clément-Bayard workshop at Issy-les-Moulineaux for further testing. This work is reflected by additions to the powerplant-related patents of 3 December. A group of modern-day Romanian investigators led by Dan Antoniu, having examined photographs from 1910, concluded that the rotary compressor featured at the exhibition was a hybrid between the one described in the initial 30 May 1910 patent and that shown in a later patent application. They felt that the exhibition machine had a simpler director system, a different rotor with a smaller intake cone, and that the exhaust gas heat transfer system had not been implemented. According to Gérard Hartmann in his Dossiers historiques et techniques aéronautique française, the propulsion system generated only 170 N (17 kgf; 38 lbf) of thrust, and to generate enough thrust for the aircraft to take off (estimated by Coandă at 240 N (24 kgf; 54 lbf)) Coandă would have had to spin the "turbine" (the rotary compressor) at a speed of 7,000 rpm with the risk of it exploding. This was not tried, but Hartmann concluded that the experiment proved that the solution worked perfectly.

Henri Mirguet writing for L'Aérophile magazine in January 1912, recalled the previous exhibition's machine as the "chief attraction" of the 1910 salon. He wrote that Coandă answered his "pressing—and indiscreet—questions" about the turbo-propulseur-powered aircraft at that earlier exhibit, telling him that the machine had attained a speed of 112 kilometres per hour (70 mph) during several "flight tests", an improbable answer about which Mirguet "reserved judgment", waiting for confirmation that never materialised.

== Related developments ==
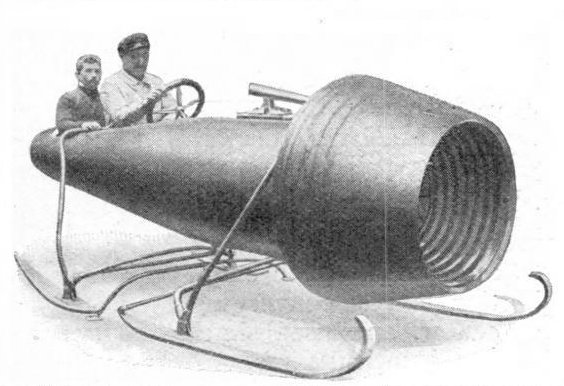
The 1910 Coandă engine design was also used on a sledge designed for Grand Duke Cyril of Russia.

The additional turbo-propulseur patent application 13.502, dated 3 December 1910, was implemented on a double-seat motorised sled commissioned by Cyril Vladimirovich, Grand Duke of Russia. With the help of Despujols, a boat maker, and the motor manufacturer Gregoire, Coandă supervised the building of a motor sled, powered by a 30 hp (22 kW) Gregoire engine driving the turbo-propulseur. The sledge was blessed by Russian Orthodox priests at the Despujols plant near Paris on 2 December 1910. Starting the next day, it was exhibited for two weeks at the 12th Automobile Salon of France, alongside Gregoire-powered automobiles on the Gregoire stand. A number of automobile and general interest magazines published photographs or sketches of the sledge. A version of Coandă's turbo-propulseur design was shown for the second time in late 1910 at the Grand Palais of Paris. One of the periodicals reported an expected speed of 60 mph (97 km/h), but no account exists of the sledge being tested.

Coandă continued to work on the Coandă-1910 project at the beginning of 1911, aiming to improve stability, increase the power of the turbo-propulseur, and to implement aerofoil improvements. He applied for new patents for aerodynamic investigations and improvements of the Coandă-1910. Coandă described a different, more sturdy system for the attachment of the wings, which also enabled changes in the angle of attack and the centre of gravity. He aimed to obtain more power from the propulsion system, and design drawings show the arrangement of two air-cooled rotary engines on the sides of the fuselage. The placement of the engines indicates that Coandă did not intend to inject fuel into the jet stream and ignite it as the cooling of the engines would have been compromised. The patent was annotated with an additional claim on 19 July 1911 which brought significant changes including the addition of retractable landing gear with dampers inside aerodynamic fairings with skids, removal of the horizontal stabiliser, a supporting surface was provided for each engine and their accessories were covered to improve aerodynamics. Though Coandă continued to study rotary propulsion mechanisms, Antoniu believes that Coandă never implemented a practical solution because of the lack of funds. In May 1911 Coandă filed English-language patents on the turbo-propulseur design in the United Kingdom and the United States, as well as a second French-language patent filed in Switzerland, and he described it for the 1911 publication of L'Annuaire de l'Air.

The very expensive project of 1910, costing Coandă about one million francs, left him with limited funds. The possibility of a new contract with the French government led Coandă to build the Coandă-1911. He wished to win the French Army-organised Military Aviation Competition at Reims in October, one that required two engines in each aircraft as a fail-safe strategy. At the third aviation salon in Paris 1911, Coandă displayed a scale model of the aircraft which used two Gnome rotary engines mounted back to back, connected by a bevel gear to a single two-bladed propeller. The combination of two engines connected to one propeller was originally intended to drive a new turbine, but Coandă was unable to fund one. During trials the assembly did not provide enough traction and a four-bladed propeller was ordered. The mounting support of the engines, initially intended for a jet propulsion version, was not adequate for the new configuration so the forward chassis had to be modified. Henri Mirguet writing for L'Aérophile magazine in January 1912 said that the new 1911 aircraft retained the fuselage, the frame and the wing of Coandă's 1910 design, but did not keep the turbo-propulseur or "the wooden wingloading surface including the forward longitudinal ribs". The aircraft was flown on 21 October 1911, but with modest results as the latest modifications, especially those related to the powerplant, did not compensate for the increased total weight of the aircraft. At the military contest, it did not meet the requirement for independent operation of each engine.

Following the 1911 exhibition, at the personal request of Sir George White, Coandă moved to the United Kingdom to take a position as chief engineer or chief designer at British and Colonial Aeroplane Company for a few years. In the next four decades Coandă worked on a great variety of inventions. During World War II he revived his earlier turbo-propulseur engine when he was contracted by the German Army in late 1942 to develop an air propulsion system for military ambulance snow sledges much like the one made for the Russian Grand Duke. The German contract concluded after one year, yielding no plans for production. Though Coandă had experimented with a variety of nozzles, and said that he had achieved a degree of success, no turbojet-engine-style fuel injection or combustion in the air stream was attempted.

Coandă and his 1910 aircraft were absent from much of aviation literature of the day. None of the annual issues of Jane's All the World's Aircraft ever mentioned the Coandă-1910 or its turbo-propulseur powerplant. The Soviet engineer Nikolai Rynin made no mention of Coandă in his exhaustive nine-volume encyclopaedia on jet and rocket engines, written in the late 1920s and early '30s.

== Later claims ==
With the arrival of the practical jet engine, several histories of the technology to date were written. A once-classified Guggenheim Aeronautical Laboratory and Jet Propulsion Laboratory study completed in 1946 described the Coandă-1910 as "probably not flown" but featuring "a mechanical jet propulsion device with a centrifugal blower", one in which heat from the Clerget piston engine "furnished auxiliary jet propulsion." In the editorial lead to their 1946 article on Coandă's "Augmented Flow", Flight terms it, "scarcely a jet". In the same year Geoffrey G. Smith chronicled technological development in his book Gas Turbines and Jet Propulsion for Aircraft, but did not mention Coandă.

In 1950's l'aviation d'Ader et des temps héroiques, the authors assert that Coandă flew the first jet aircraft at Issy-les-moulineaux for 30 metres (100 ft), ending with a crash. In 1953, Flight's treatment of aircraft in the 50 years since the Wright brothers' flight included the Coandă-1910 "ducted fan" and said of Coandă that he "believes that he 'took off for a few feet, then came down hurriedly and broke two teeth'", quoting J. W. Adderley's 1952 letter to the editor of Flight after Adderley's discussion with Coandă in Paris at the end of World War II. Adderley said he "can definitely confirm that the power unit was of the ducted-fan type, similar in basic principles to the Caproni-Campini aircraft of the 1930s" (referring to the Caproni Campini N.1).

In the early 1950s Coandă began to claim that he had flown his 1910 aircraft himself, and that the 1910 engine was the first motorjet, using fuel injection and combustion to create its thrust. In 1955 and 1956, a number of aviation articles presented the Coandă version of 1910 events. He said he took off and crashed in December 1910 in the presence of aircraft makers Louis Charles Breguet and Gabriel Voisin. Coandă himself spoke on the subject, notably before the Wings Club at New York's Biltmore Hotel on 18 January 1956 where he said "I intended to inject fuel into the air stream which would be ignited by the exhaust gases also channelled through the same circular vent", implying that he never finished the powerplant. Martin Caidin wrote "The Coanda Story" for the May 1956 issue of Flying, based on a personal interview. For his article "He Flew in 1910", René Aubrey interviewed Coandă and wrote a contradictory story in the September 1956 Royal Air Force Flying Review, saying that Coandă had flown his unusual aircraft on 16 December 1910, that fuel was certainly injected, and that it was "the first jet flight in the world". In Aubrey's relation of the interview, the aircraft stalled after take-off, throwing Coandă clear, and "gently collapsed to the ground" where it burned. Aubrey wrote that the aircraft engine was "designed by a friend to Coandă's specification", and that its burning exhaust was "directed below and to each side of the fuselage, which was protected by asbestos in vulnerable places."

In Jet Age Airlanes of 1956, Coandă himself published an article entitled "The First Jet Flight". He submitted the same text that Caidin had written for Flying in May:

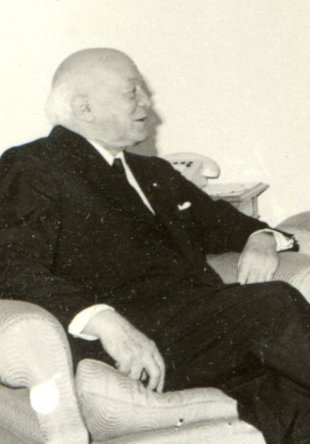
Henri Coandă in 1967

"In December, we brought the airplane out of its hangar at Issy-les-Moulineaux and, after a bit of coaxing, started the motor. I must admit that I was never a very outstanding pilot. I always seemed unable to shake off a vague apprehension and, that morning, in addition to my usual uneasiness, I was rather excited. I climbed into the cockpit, accelerated the motor, and felt the power from the jet thrust straining the plane forward. I gave the signal to remove the wheel blocks, and the plane started moving slowly ahead. I had anticipated that I would not attempt to fly today, but would make only ground tests on the small field at Issy-les-Moulineaux. The controls seemed too loose to me, so I injected fuel into the turbine. Too much! In a moment I was surrounded by flames! I had to cut back and reduce my power quickly. I worked the throttle and the flames subsided. Only then did I have opportunity to lift my head. I saw that the plane had gained speed, and that the walls of the ancient fortifications bordering the field were lunging toward me. I pulled back on the stick, only much too hard. In a moment the plane was airborne, lunging upward at a steep angle. I was flying—I felt the plane tipping—then slipping down on one wing. Instinctively, I cut the gas with my left hand and the jet fuel with my right. The next thing I knew, I found myself thrown free of the plane, which slowly came down, and burst into flames. It was impossible to determine from the wreckage whether the celluloid or the fuel was the cause of the fire. But the test was over. I had flown the first jet airplane."

A collection of aviation stories was published in 1957 by Major Victor Houart, a friend of Coandă's, who wrote that he was an eyewitness the day Coandă flew and crashed. One chapter of the book describes how Houart, together with a group of French dragoons, watched as Coandă taxied twice around the airfield, lifted off to avoid the ruins of an old fortification wall, started flames from the engine by applying too much power, and was thrown from the aircraft the moment it hit the wall, with Coandă "not badly hurt". Houart's version put the fuel tank in the overhead wing, which was metal. In further statements, Coandă said that his 1910 aircraft had movable leading edge slots, (Note: The leading edge slot was patented by Handley Page in 1920) retractable landing gear and a fuel supply which was held in the overhead wing to reduce fuselage profile and thus drag. In 1965, Coandă presented a set of drawings, photographs and specifications of the 1910 aircraft to the National Air and Space Museum (NASM), prepared by Huyck Corporation and received by Director S. Paul Johnston and early aviation curator Louis Casey.

Rocket engineer G. Harry Stine worked alongside Coandă from 1961 to 1965 at Huyck Corporation, and interviewed him in 1962. In 1967, the magazine Flying printed an account written by Stine, which described the landing gear as retracting into the lower wing, with the fuel tank hidden in the upper wing. Stine wrote that Coandă flew on 10 December 1910, and described the heat from the "two jet exhausts" as being "too much for me" after the powerplant was mounted in the aircraft. In the 1980s after Coandă's death, Stine wrote a magazine article and a book mentioning the 1910 aircraft, including new details such as the name of master mechanic Pierre Clerget as the friend who helped build the turbo-propulseur. Stine's recounting of the 10 December flight included the group of eyewitness French dragoons, asbestos heat shields and metal deflector plates aft of the engine, intended taxiing with unintentional flight, a steep climb with a stall, Coandă thrown clear, and the aircraft crashing to the ground, burning. Stine gave his assessment that "Coanda's turbopropulseur had elements of a true jet", but that the patent application had no indication of the "critical stage—injection of fuel into the compressed air". He wrote that "although there were several jet-propelled aircraft in existence at an early time—the 1910 Coanda Jet and the 1938 Caproni Campini N.1—the first pure jet aircraft flight was made in Germany in 1938".

In 1965, Historian Emeritus Paul E. Garber of the NASM interviewed Coandă, who related that the December 1910 flight was no accident, that he had seated himself in the cockpit intending to test five factors: aircraft structure, the engine, the wing lift, the balance of controls, and the aerodynamics. He said that the heat from the engine was "fantastic", but that he placed mica sheets and deflecting plates to direct the jet blast away from the wooden fuselage. Garber wrote that as Coandă's aircraft began to move forward and rise from the ground, "the exhaust flame, instead of fanning outward, curved inward and ignited the aircraft." In this interview Coandă said that he brought the aircraft back to earth under control, but the landing was "abrupt" and he was thrown clear of the airframe which was consumed completely by flame, the engine reduced to "a few handfuls of white powder."

=== Rebuttals ===
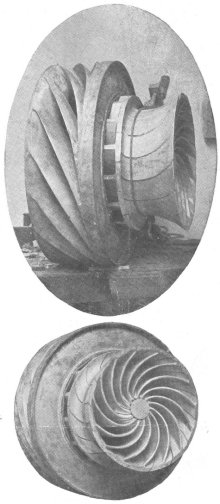
Details of the rotary fan portion of the 1910 engine

In 1960, Charles Harvard Gibbs-Smith, aviation historian at the Science Museum in London, reacted to the mid-1950s assertion that Coandă built and flew the first jet engine aircraft. Gibbs-Smith wrote that "there has recently arisen some controversy about this machine, designed by the Romanian-born and French-domiciled Henri Coanda, which was exhibited at the Paris salon in October 1910. Until recently it has been accepted as an all-wood sesquiplane, with cantilever wings, powered by a 50 hp Clerget engine driving a 'turbo-propulseur' in the form of a large but simple ducted air fan. This fan was fitted right across the machine's nose and the cowling covered the nose and part of the engine: the resulting 'jet' of plain air was to propel the aeroplane." He wrote that "no claims that it flew, or was even tested, were made at the time", and that the story of it flying suddenly appeared in the 1950s—the aircraft was thus "disinterred from its obscurity." He wrote that the airfield at Issy-les-Moulineaux, a former military exercise ground where the test supposedly took place, was under the constant observation of the French Army who owned it, by French aviation reporters and photographers, and by aviation experts from other countries. He said that the airfield was the "most famous, most used, most observed, and most reported-on 'airfield' in Paris", and that all events, let alone an exciting crash and destruction by fire, would have been carried in local papers and described in military reports, but no contemporary accounts exist of the Coandă-1910 being tested, flown or destroyed. Gibbs-Smith countered the Coandă assertions point by point, saying that the aircraft did not have a retractable undercarriage, did not have leading or trailing edge wing slots, did not have a fuel tank overhead in the wing, and did not have fuel injected into any turbine. Gibbs-Smith pointed out that the pilot would have been killed by the heat if any combustion had been initiated in the engine's air stream.

In 1970 Gibbs-Smith wrote another account of the Coanda-1910, using much the same phrasing as in 1960:

"Another unsuccessful, but prophetic, machine was the Coanda biplane (strictly speaking a sesquiplane) exhibited at the Paris Salon in October. It was of all-wood construction, with fully cantilevered wings—which did not look very robust—and an Antoinette-like fuselage with obliquely cruciform tail-unit; it was equipped with a reaction propulsion unit consisting of a 50 hp Clerget engine driving a large ducted fan in front of it, the latter enclosed in a cowling which covered the nose of the machine and part of the engine: the fan was a simple air-fan driving back the air to form the propulsive 'jet'. Although inevitably earth-bound, this aircraft stands as the first full-size attempt at a jet-propelled aeroplane."

In 2010, Antoniu wrote that he thought Gibbs-Smith speculated on the basis of the evidence of absence that the aircraft was never tested or flown, but that Gibbs-Smith did not find any concrete evidence to support his position. Similarly, Antoniu was unable to find concrete proof of a test flight. Antoniu also wrote that Gibbs-Smith did not check the French patents claimed by Coandă in 1910 and 1911, describing the retractable gear, leading edge wing slot and upper wing fuel tank, and that he did not see photographs from private collections demonstrating aspects about which he wrote.

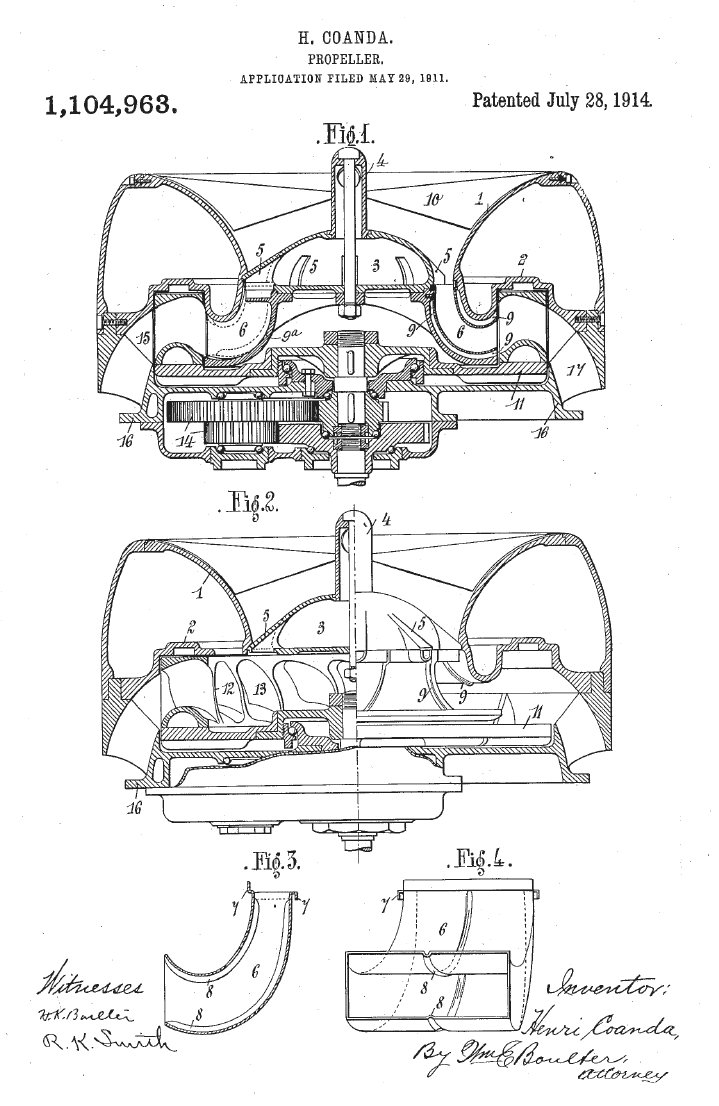
Coandă's US patent diagram for "Improvement in Propellers", filed 1911 and granted 1914

In 1980, NASM historian Frank H. Winter examined the 1965 drawings and specifications Coandă prepared while at Huyck Corporation and wrote an article about Coandă's claim: "There is a wholly new description of the inner workings of the machine that does not occur in any of the accounts given [in the 1910s] and which defies all of the patent specifications." He said Coandă told various conflicting stories about his claimed 1910 flight, and that Coandă produced a set of altered drawings as proof of his claims:

"The differences between this version of Coanda's story and his earlier one are marked and hardly need to be pointed out; though the obvious ones are: the planned versus the completely accidental and unintentional flight; the immediate flight versus the busy taxiing about the field; Coanda being thrown from the plane after it stalled versus Coanda pitched forward after landing, and so on. Apart from his personal recollections, Henri Coanda also bestowed upon the museum some drawings and illustrations of his turbo-propulseur. The drawings, purporting to show internal details of the machine, are unfortunately modern. That is to say, they were obviously executed in the 1960s, not in 1910 or 1911; worse, the fuel injection outlet tubes into the aft end of the turbine seems to be an even later addition to the original drawings. In brief, the drawings by themselves do not constitute evidence in Coanda's claim."

In his article, Winter wondered why Coandă did not add the novel feature of fuel injection and air stream combustion to his May 1911 patent applications if that feature had been present during his supposed flying experience five months earlier. Rather, Winter noted that the August 1910 patent filings in French were essentially the same as the May 1911 ones in English, and that all the descriptions were applicable to air or water flowing through the device, meaning that the patents could not possibly include fuel combustion in the jet stream. He also noted that no mention was made in the early patents of asbestos or mica heat shields, or of any fuel injection or combustion.

While looking through aviation periodicals and Paris newspapers reporting for the month of December 1910, Winter found that there was a spell of bad weather at Issy during which no flying took place. This situation occurred mid-month, the period covering the conflicting dates (10 and 16 December) that Coandă said his aircraft was tested, flown and crashed. In their regular "Foreign Aviation News" column, Flight magazine reported that the "blank period" of inclement weather at Issy ended on the 19th when Guillaume Busson tested a monoplane made by Armand Deperdussin. Other aircraft tests and piloting activities were listed, with no mention of Coandă or his machine.

Winter found that Camille (or Cosimo) Canovetti, an Italian civil and aviation engineer, had been working on a turbo-propulseur-style aviation engine before Coandă, and had attempted to show an aircraft with such an engine at the Aviation Exposition in Milan in 1909. Canovetti took out patents on his machine in 1909, and more in 1910. Canovetti wrote in 1911 that the 1910 appearance of the Coandă engine "called general attention" to designs like his.

== After Coandă's death ==
Modern reference books about aviation history represent the Coandă-1910 in various ways, if they mention the machine or the inventor at all. Some acknowledge Coandă as the discoverer of the Coandă effect but give Hans von Ohain the honour of designing the first jet engine to power an aircraft in manned flight, and Frank Whittle the honour of completing and patenting the first jet engine capable of such flight. In their 1994 book American Aviation, authors Joe Christy and LeRoy Cook state that Coandă's 1910 aircraft was the first jet.

Aviation author Bill Gunston changed his mind two years after publishing a 1993 book in which he gave Coandă credit for the first jet engine. Gunston's 1995 description began: "Romanian Henri Coanda built a biplane with a Clerget inline piston engine which, instead of turning a propeller, drove a centrifugal compressor blowing air to the rear. The thrust was said to be 220 kilograms [490 lb], a figure the author disbelieves. On 10 December 1910 the aircraft thus powered inadvertently became airborne, crashed and burned. Often called 'a turbine aeroplane', this was of no more significance than the Campini aircraft mentioned later, and Coanda wisely decided to switch to a propeller." In his publication of 1998, World Encyclopedia of Aero Engines: All major aircraft power plants, from the Wright brothers to the present day, Gunston did not include Coanda; nor did he include Coanda in 2005's Jane's Aero-Engines or 2006's World Encyclopedia of Aero Engines.

Walter J. Boyne, director of the National Air and Space Museum and a prolific aviation author, mentions Coandă in passing a few times in his works. Boyne discusses Coandă briefly in one of his books, The Leading Edge: "Professor Henri Coanda, whose scientific work was impeccable, designed and built a jet aircraft in 1910; it, like Martin's Kitten [the Martin KF-1 biplane], was superbly built and technically advanced—and could not fly." In a later magazine article sidebar, Boyne described more details: "Romanian inventor Henri Coanda attempted to fly a primitive jet aircraft in 1910, using a four-cylinder internal combustion engine to drive a compressor at 4,000 revolutions per minute. It was equipped with what today might be called an afterburner, producing an estimated 500 pounds [2.3 kN or 230 kgf] of thrust. Countless loyal Coanda fans insist that the airplane flew. Others say it merely crashed."

In 1980 and 1993, Jane's Encyclopedia of Aviation included an entry on the 1910 aircraft, calling it the "Coanda turbine" and describing it as "the world's first jet-propelled aircraft to fly". In 2003, Winter co-authored a book with fellow NASM curator F. Robert van der Linden: 100 Years of Flight: A Chronicle of Aerospace History, 1903–2003. In the book the Coandă-1910 is described as an unsuccessful ducted fan aircraft lacking documentation to substantiate any flight test.

Citing Carl A. Brown's 1985 A History of Aviation, Tim Brady, the Dean of Aviation at Embry–Riddle Aeronautical University, wrote in 2000: "the development of the jet is, broadly, the story of three men: Henri Coanda, Sir Frank Whittle, and Pabst von Ohain..." His description of Coandă's disputed test flight agreed that fuel injection and combustion had been initiated in the rotary compressor's vent, with the novel detail that the aircraft "flew for about a thousand feet [300 m] before crashing into a wall." In 1990 at the 24th Symposium of the International Academy of Astronautics, one of the papers presented included this sentence: "It is to Henri Coanda (1886–1972), a world famous inventor and pioneer of jet flight, that space engineering owes—beside one of the first model planes provided with a rocket engine (1905)—the construction and engine experiment of the first jet aircraft, the 'Coanda-1910'." In 2007 in his popular book Extreme Aircraft, Ron Miller wrote that the powerplant in the Coandă-1910 was one of the "earliest attempts" at a jet engine, but was unsuccessful—it was "incapable of actual flight", unlike the engines designed by Whittle and Ohain. The question of the Coandă-1910 being the first jet aircraft does not appear to be resolved, supporting Stine's view: "Whether Henri Coanda built the first true jet will probably be argued interminably."

In the 2000s, Dan Antoniu and other Romanian aviation experts investigated existing photographs of the Coandă-1910, leading them to believe that the aircraft presented at the exhibition was not finished, that it was exhibited with many improvisations. Antoniu published Henri Coandă and his technical work during 1906–1918, a 2010 book in which he said that the unfinished state of the aircraft led to Coandă filing several extra patents and starting a new series of studies with the aim of making the machine airworthy. For instance, Antoniu wrote that the exhaust pipes of the Clergét engine appeared free; there were no devices to redirect exhaust gases to the turbine as described in the patent, and there were no heat shields for crew protection. As well, the central attachment of the tubular struts holding the wings to the fuselage, with mere collars secured with screws, was judged by Antoniu as appearing potentially unsafe during take-off or landing because of the "considerable loads on the struts". The X-shaped empennage was covered at high angles by the horizontal stabiliser making it unusable, and any high-speed taxi would put the machine in danger of a nose-over.

== Memorials and models ==
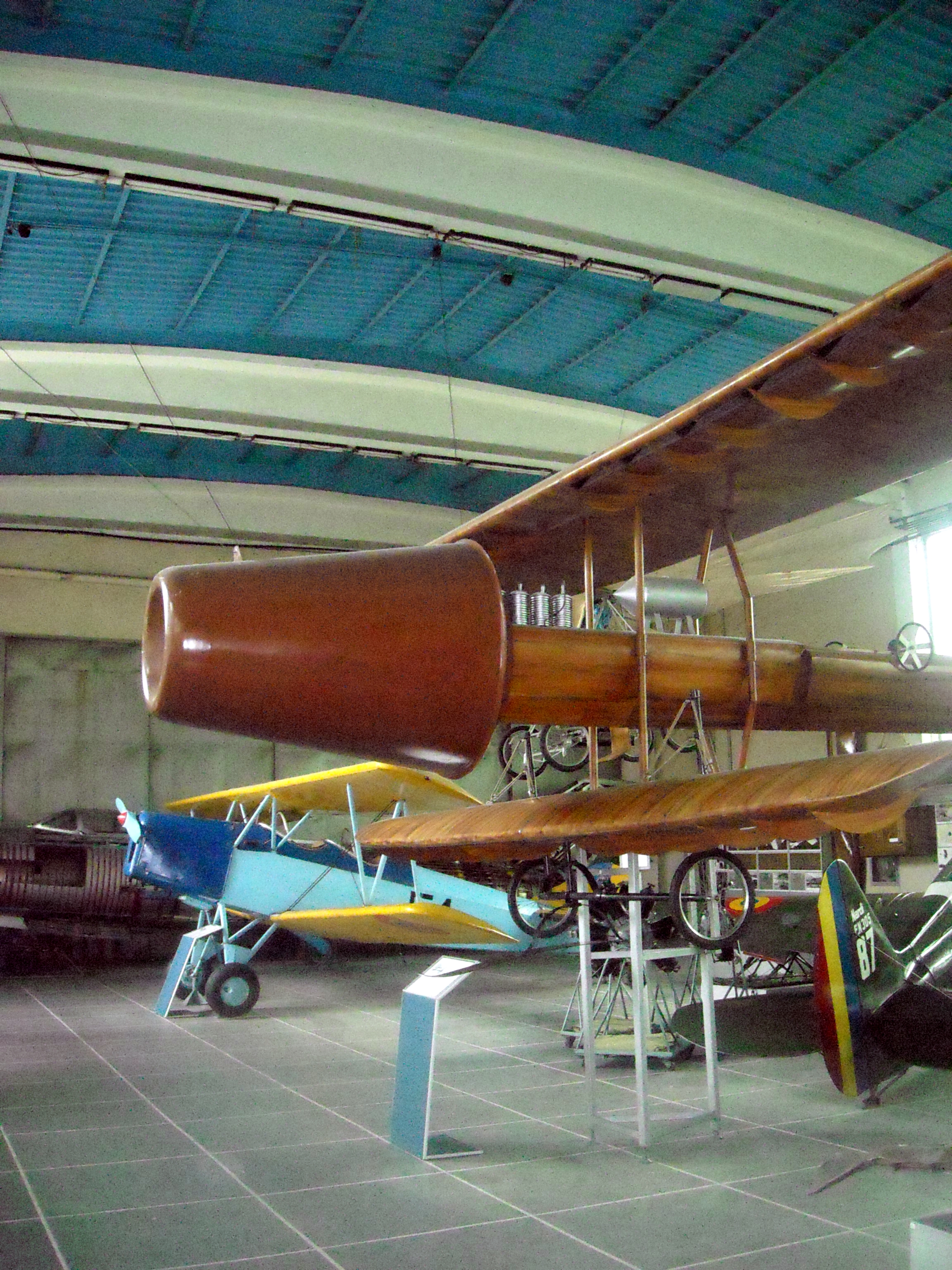
Full-scale replica of the Coandă-1910 at the National Military Museum in Bucharest

A full-size replica of the Coandă-1910, built in 2001, is displayed in Bucharest at the National Military Museum, and a scale model is displayed in the French Air and Space Museum at Paris – Le Bourget Airport. At the site of the historic Issy-les-Moulineaux airfield, a large plaque lists the three pioneers of flight most closely associated with the airfield: Louis Blériot, Alberto Santos-Dumont and Henri Farman. Later, a plaque honouring Coandă and Romanian aviation engineer Traian Vuia was placed on a nearby building under the auspices of the mayor of Issy-les-Moulineaux, L'Aéroclub de France, and the Romanian Association for Aviation History.

Construction on a full-sized functional replica of the plane began in March 2010 at Craiova, Romania, by a team of engineers and former test pilots from I.R.Av. Craiova. The replica is based on plans that Coandă reworked in 1965 because the 1910 plans were lost. It uses metal for the fuselage rather than wood, and its intended engine is a true jet, the Motorlet M-701, made for the 1960s-era Aero L-29 Delfín military trainer.

In October 2010 the National Bank of Romania issued a commemorative silver coin for the centennial of the building of the first jet aircraft. The 10-lei piece is intended for coin collectors, with the official purchase price set at 220 lei. It represents the aircraft on the obverse side and a portrait of Coandă on the reverse, including Romanian words which translate to "first jet aircraft". The same month the philatelic section of the Romanian Post, Romfilatelia, produced a limited edition philatelic folder and a stamp commemorating the centennial of jet aircraft. The stamp presents a modern internal schema of the Coandă-1910, a drawing of the injectors and burners, and a quote from Gustave Eiffel: "This boy was born 30 if not 50 years too early". At the European Parliament in December, president Jerzy Buzek opened a centennial exhibition celebrating the building and testing of the Coandă-1910.

== Specifications ==
Data from Contemporary pamphlet

General characteristics

- Crew: 1
- Length: 12.5 m (41 ft 0 in)
- Wingspan: 10.3 m (33 ft 10 in)
- Wing area: 32 m^{2} (350 sq ft)
- Gross weight: 420 kg (920 lb)
- Powerplant: 1 × Four-cylinder, inline, water-cooled Clerget engine driving a compressor , 37 kW (50 hp)

== Related ==
- Stipa-Caproni
