= Cristian Dumitrescu =

Romanian politician

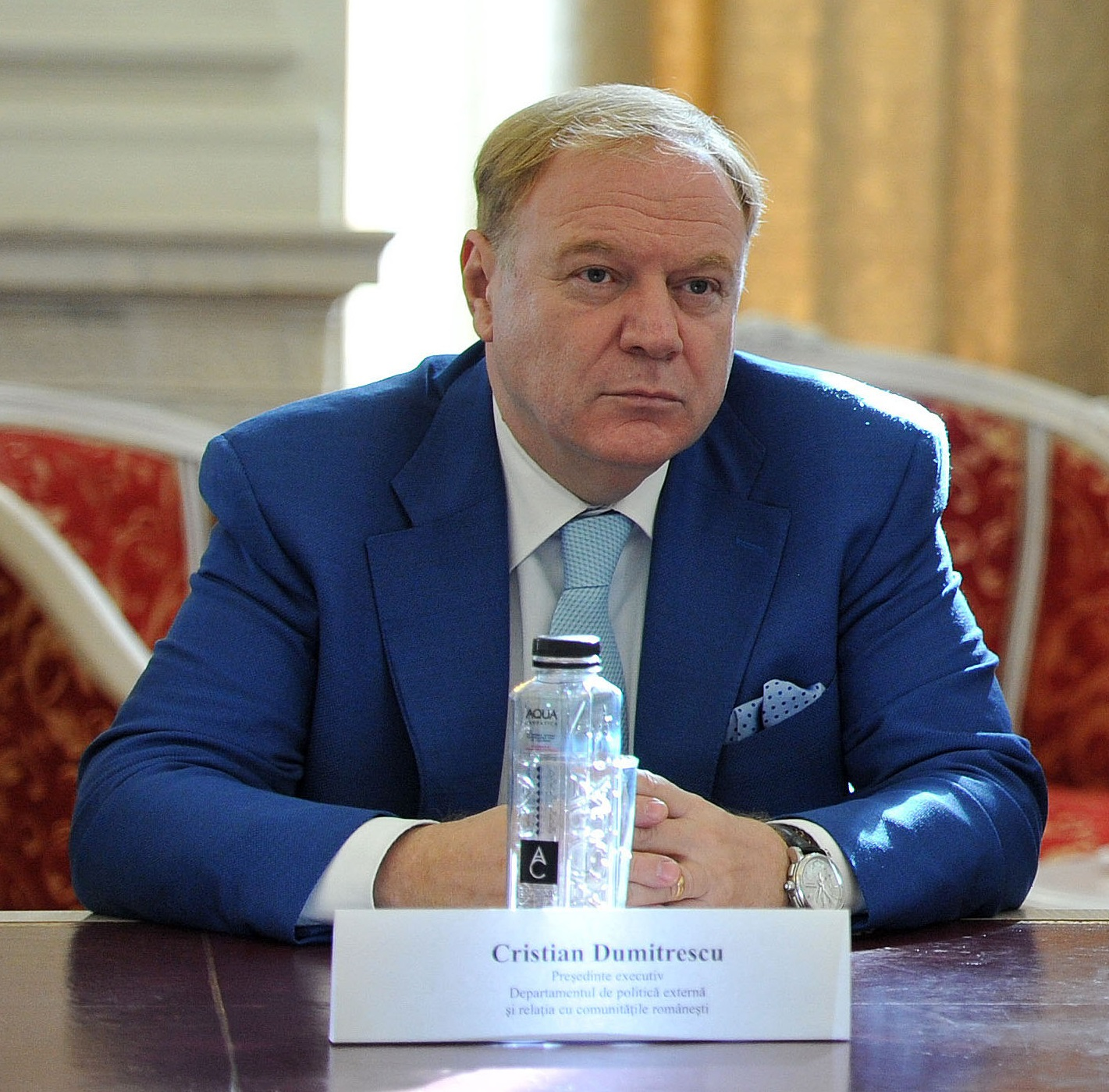
Dumitrescu in 2012

Cristian-Sorin Dumitrescu (born 24 April 1955) is a Romanian politician.

Born in Bucharest, he graduated from the Bucharest Academy of Economic Studies (ASE) in 1978. He was a factory economist from that time until 1983, a journalist from 1983 to 1990, and a diplomat from 1990 to 1992. Elected to the Romanian Senate for Suceava County in 1992, he was initially a member of the National Salvation Front (FSN) and then subsequently switched to the Democratic Party (PD) in 1993. He was re-elected in 1996. In 2000, he was elected to the Romanian Chamber of Deputies, also for Suceava County, and defected to the Social Democratic Party (PSD) in 2001.

He was again elected a deputy in 2004 and in 2008, this time for Vrancea County. During 2007, following the accession of Romania to the European Union, he was a Member of the European Parliament. He returned to the Senate in 2012, for the same county. In March 2014, following the resignation of Crin Antonescu, he was briefly acting Senate President.
