= Constantin Boerescu =

Romanian lawyer and politician

- Born: 1836; Bucharest
- Died: October 23, 1908 (aged 71–72)
- Other names: Costache Boerescu
- Education: Saint Sava College University of Paris University of Bucharest
- Occupations: Lawyer and politician

Constantin Boerescu (nicknamed Costache Boerescu; 1836–October 23, 1908) was a Wallachian-born Romanian lawyer and politician.

Born in Bucharest, he was descended from the pitar Constantin Boerescu. In 1855, after graduating from Saint Sava College in his native city, he left for France. There, he obtained a doctorate in law from the University of Paris. After returning home, he taught civil law at the University of Bucharest in 1864, then becoming a prominent lawyer. Boerescu entered politics within the Bucharest conservative group during the regime of Alexandru Ioan Cuza. He sat on the constituent assembly that drafted and adopted the 1866 Constitution.

A prominent member of the Conservative Party, formed in 1880, he joined its executive committee in 1902. He formed part of the opposition to the Liberal government and to King Carol I, signing the 1887 manifesto that led to the cabinet's downfall the next year. Elected to the Senate in 1888, Boerescu was named to the government of Lascăr Catargiu, serving as Minister of Religious Affairs and Public Instruction from March to November 1889. He was Senate President three times: May to December 1891, June 1899 to February 1901 and February 1905 to April 1907.

In 1865, he helped found the Romanian Athenaeum Society. His works included Les Principautés devant le second Congrès de Paris (1858), in which he advocated for the Union of the Principalities; De l'amélioration de l'état de paysans roumains (1861); and a literary effort, the 1855 Aldo și Aminta sau Bandiții. In 1903, he collected his political speeches in book form.
