= List of mayors of Oradea =

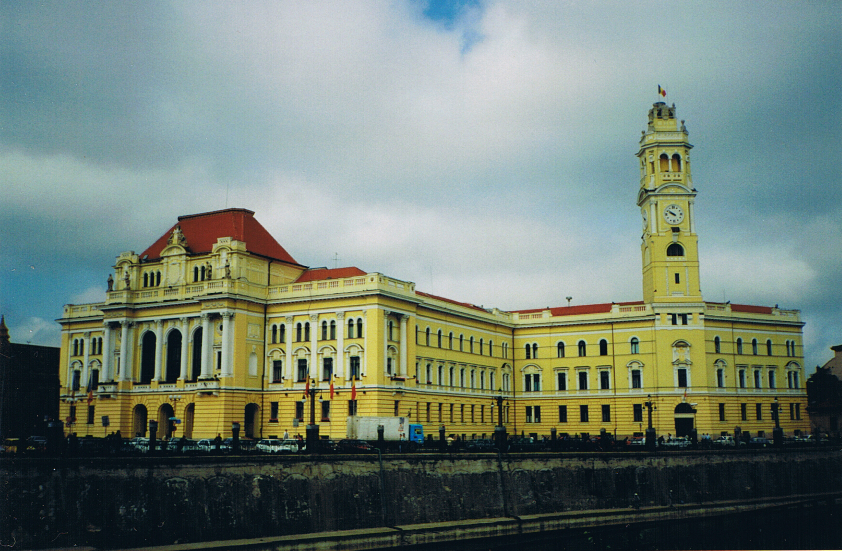

On January 4, 1850, the "central towns" (Várad-Újváros/Orașul Nou, Vándrad-Olaszi/Olosig, Várad-Velence/Velența a Várad/Váralja-Subcetate) were officially united, forming Oradea Mare (Great Oradea). The first designated mayor of the united towns was Bolonyi Menyhert.

== Mayors of Oradea ==
Mayor	Period	Observations	State
Menyhért Bölönyi	January 4, 1850 - June 25, 1851	First mayor of Oradea Mare.	Kingdom of Hungary
János Csorba	1851–1854		Kingdom of Hungary
Arnold Takács	1854–1855		Kingdom of Hungary
Ferenc Miklósi	1855–1857		Kingdom of Hungary
Ödön Toperczer	1857–1860		Kingdom of Hungary
András Petrovics	1860 - January 21, 1861	Interim, as counselor.	Kingdom of Hungary
György Lukács	January 21, 1861 – 1862		Kingdom of Hungary
Mihály Lázár	1862–1865		Kingdom of Hungary
Lajos Stettner	1866–1867		Kingdom of Hungary
György Lukács	1867 - November 11, 1875		Austria-Hungary
Ferenc Sal	November 11, 1875 – 1897		Austria-Hungary
József Bulyovszky	1897 - June 1901		Austria-Hungary
Károly Rimler	June 1901 - March 22, 1919	Until March 1902 he was a designated mayor.	Austria-Hungary
Directoship	March 22 - April 19, 1919		Austria-Hungary
Károly Rimler	April 19 - June 15, 1919	On April 19, 1919, the Romanian Army enters Oradea, thus officializing the Union of Transylvania with Romania through the Resolution of the Great National Assembly of Alba Iulia, of December 1, 1918.	Kingdom of Romania
Ödön Lukács	June 15 - July 31, 1919	Interim (as vice mayor)	Kingdom of Romania
József Komlóssy	August 1, 1919 - February 8, 1920		Kingdom of Romania
Coriolan Bucico	February 9, 1920 - July 1, 1926		Kingdom of Romania
Gheorghe Tulbure	July 2, 1926 - June 3, 1927	Interim until September 21, 1926, as president of the Interim Commission.	Kingdom of Romania
Sever Ardelean	June 4 - August 1, 1927	Interim, as president of the Interim Commission.	Kingdom of Romania
Grigore Egri	August 2 - October 12, 1927		Kingdom of Romania
Nicolae Zigre	October 12, 1927 - December 1, 1928	Interim, as president of the Interim Commission.	Kingdom of Romania
Aurel Lazăr	December 1, 1928 - November 18, 1930	Interim until July 26, 1930, as president of the Interim Commission.	Kingdom of Romania
Romulus Pop	November 18 - December 12, 1930	Interim, as president of the Interim Commission.	Kingdom of Romania
Grigore Egri	December 12, 1930 - May 25, 1931	Interim, as president of the Interim Commission.	Kingdom of Romania
George Sofronie	May 25, 1931 - July 11, 1932	Interim, as president of the Interim Commission.	Kingdom of Romania
Grigore Egri	July 11, 1932 - November 29, 1933	Interim until October 20, 1932, as president of the Interim Commission.	Kingdom of Romania
Tiberiu Moșoiu	November 29, 1933 - November 2, 1935	Interim, as president of the Interim Commission.	Kingdom of Romania
Vasile Bledea	November 2, 1935 - May 11, 1937	Interim, as president of the Interim Commission.	Kingdom of Romania
Petru Fodor	May 11, 1937 - January 5, 1938	Interim, as president of the Interim Commission.	Kingdom of Romania
Dimitrie Mangra	January 5 - February 11, 1938	Interim, as president of the Interim Commission.	Kingdom of Romania
Ioan Voștinar	February 11–16, 1938	Designated, as the Prime Secretary of the Municipality.	Kingdom of Romania
Constantin Constantinescu	February 16 - July 1, 1938	Designated	Kingdom of Romania
Cornel Cărpinișan	July 1 - September 23, 1938	Designated	Kingdom of Romania
Augustin Chirilă	September 23, 1938 - September 5, 1940		Kingdom of Romania
István Soós	September 5, 1940 - March 1944	As a result of the Second Vienna Awards, arbitrated by Nazi Germany and Fascist Italy, Oradea became part of Fascist Hungary.	Kingdom of Hungary
László Gyapai	March - October 12, 1944	Interim. He ordered the construction of the Jewish Ghetto in Oradea and assisted the Nazis in the deportation of the Jewish population.	Kingdom of Hungary
Augustin Corna	October 12 - November 1944	Interim. On October 12, 1944, Oradea is freed from the fascist reign, by a Romanian-Soviet battalion, thus the city being reunited with Romania.	Kingdom of Romania
Gyula Csiky	November 1944 - January 1945	Interim	Kingdom of Romania
Károly Vanyai	March 9, 1945 – 1949	The first mayor belonging to the working class	Kingdom of Romania until December 31, 1947, Romanian People's Republicfrom January 1, 1948
Sándor Pusztai	? - ?	As president of the Municipal People's Council.	Romanian People's Republic
István Boros	? - ?	As president of the Municipal People's Council.	Romanian People's Republic
András Vig	? - ?	As president of the Municipal People's Council.	Romanian People's Republic
Dreguș Ernest	? - ?	As president of the Municipal People's Council.	Romanian People's Republic
Barna Roman	? - ?	As president of the Municipal People's Council.	Romanian People's Republic
Szanto Ștefan	1968–1973	As president of the Municipal People's Council.	Socialist Republic of Romania
Gheorghe Vaida	1973–1978	Until 1976 As president of the Municipal People's Council	Socialist Republic of Romania
Petru Demeter	1978–1983		Socialist Republic of Romania
Paraschiv Alecu	1983–1988		Socialist Republic of Romania
Gheorghe Groza	1988–1989	Until the Romanian Revolution of 1989.	Socialist Republic of Romania
Mircea Bradu	1989–1990	Elected through a popular decision. He resigned after a heart attack.	Romania
Horia Văideanu	1990–1991	Interim	Romania
Octavian Bot	1991–1992		Romania
Matei Ivan	1992	Interimar	Romania
Petru Filip	1992–1996	Member of the National Salvation Front. He was the first mayor to be elected by free, secret and universal vote	Romania
Mihai Sturza	1996–2000	Member of the National Liberal Party	Romania
Petru Filip	2000–2007	Member of the Democratic Liberal Party	Romania
Mihai Groza	June 2007 - June 2008	Interim, member of the Democratic Liberal Party	Romania
Ilie Bolojan	2008 - 2020	Member of the National Liberal Party	Romania
Florin Birta	2020–present	Member of the National Liberal Party	Romania
