= Charles Harvard Gibbs-Smith =

British historian of aviation (1909–1981)

- Born: 22 March 1909; Teddington, Greater London, United Kingdom
- Died: 3 December 1981 (aged 72)

Academic work
- Main interests: Early aviation, Bayeux Tapestry, paranormal
- Notable works: The Invention of the Aeroplane
- Notable ideas: importance of inventor George Cayley; primacy of Wright brothers; critical appraisal of Clement Ader's contribution
- Influenced: historiography of aviation; accounts of the Wrights

Charles Harvard Gibbs-Smith (22 March 1909 – 3 December 1981) was a British polymath historian of aeronautics and aviation. His obituary in The Times described him as "the recognised authority on the early development of flying in Europe and America" Richard P. Hallion called him "The greatest of all historians of early aviation".

== Biography ==
Charles Gibbs-Smith was born in Teddington, Greater London in 1909 to a medical family which included in its line John Harvard, the founder of Harvard College. Gibbs-Smith attended King's College School, Cambridge, and Westminster School in central London before earning a Master of Arts degree at Harvard University in 1932. The same year, he gained employment as an assistant keeper at the Victoria and Albert Museum. In 1939 he organised the Exhibition of Early Photographs to Commemorate the Centenary of Photography, 1839–1939. He was seconded to the Ministry of Information in the Second World War and conducted training in aircraft recognition for the Royal Observer Corps—this experience catalysed a deep interest in aviation history. He authored the government's manual on aircraft recognition in 1944 as well as being a contributor to the training journal Aircraft Recognition, then became the ministry's Director of the Photographic Division in 1945.

Between 1947 and 1971 he was Keeper of the Department of Public Relations at the Victoria and Albert Museum. The department, the first public relations department of any English museum, was initially called the Museum Extension Services. In this role he arranged museum exhibitions, conducted scholarly research, and wrote on a variety of topics, including a study of the Bayeux Tapestry and a centenary collection of the Great Exhibition of 1851. Starting in 1976 he had a Research Fellowship at the Science Museum in London. Upon retirement, he was chosen as the first Charles A. Lindbergh Chair in Aerospace History at the National Air and Space Museum in 1978, for which he spent a year in the United States studying the papers of the Wright brothers.

== Research and writings ==
In The Invention of the Aeroplane 1799–1909, Gibbs-Smith wrote a concise account of aeronautical developments which led slowly to functional fixed-wing aircraft. He credited the American Wright Brothers with the first manned, powered and sustained flight because their Wright Flyer travelled more than a quarter mile (400 m) through the air, an "arbitrary" distance that Gibbs-Smith determined would separate sustained flight from powered hops. Gibbs-Smith noted the important influence of the French Army Captain Ferdinand Ferber who helped the Wright Brothers become well-known in Europe, and who pushed for the stability of a fixed tailplane rather than the Wright's wing warping design which was too limiting.

Gibbs-Smith investigated the disputed subject of inventor Clément Ader's 1897 aeronautical experiments. Gibbs-Smith's 1968 book on Ader thoroughly described the documented evidence that Ader did not make a controlled flight in 1897, and only claimed to have done so in 1906, after others had already flown.

In his 1960's "definitive" work The Aeroplane: An Historical Survey Of Its Origins And Development, Gibbs-Smith wrote for the Science Museum about the controversy over Henri Coandă's early aircraft—the Coandă-1910—which Coandă said was the first jet aircraft. Gibbs-Smith wrote a rebuttal to Coandă, describing how the aircraft had no injection or combustion of fuel in the air stream. Gibbs-Smith said that it would have been suicidal to the pilot to attain combustion of the turbine-compressed air as the open cockpit would be subjected to the heat of the exhaust.

Gibbs-Smith also investigated reports of the paranormal, including ghosts, flying saucers and parapsychology. He defended his studies among more sceptical colleagues.

== Honours ==
- The Danish government appointed him to the Order of the Dannebrog for his work on a 1948 exhibition.
- The Royal Aeronautical Society awarded him an Honorary Companionship.

== Selected publications ==
- The Aircraft Recognition Manual (1944) – formerly Basic Aircraft Recognition
- The Great Exhibition of 1851 (1951). London: His Majesty's Stationery Office
- The Wright Brothers: A Brief Account of their Work, 1899–1911 (1963). London: Science Museum.
- Sir George Cayley's Aeronautics, 1796–1855 (1962)
- The Invention of the Aeroplane 1799–1909 (1966), London: Faber & Faber.
- A Directory and Nomenclature of the First Aeroplanes 1809 to 1909 (1966). London: Her Majesty's Stationery Office
- Clément Ader – his flight claims and his place in history (1968), London: Science Museum
- Aviation: an historical survey from its origins to the end of World War II (1960; 1970; 1985), London: Science Museum
- The Bayeux Tapestry (1973), London; New York, Phaidon; Praeger
- The Rebirth of European Aviation 1902–1908 (1974). London: Science Museum
