= S. Paul Johnston =

American aviator, writer, aviation expert and museum director (1899–1985)

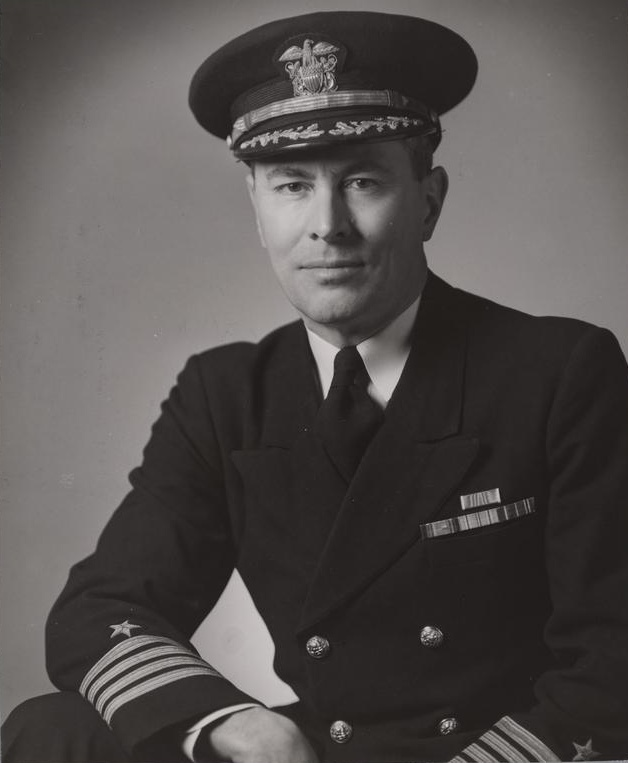
Captain S. (Samuel) Paul Johnston USNR 80442. April 1946

Samuel Paul Johnston (1899 – 9 August 1985) was an American aviation expert, editor, writer, museum director and United States Navy captain. He edited Aviation Week, directed the Institute of Aeronautical Sciences, and was the second director of the Smithsonian Institution's National Air and Space Museum from 1964 to 1969 in Washington, DC Johnston also served on the President's Air Policy Commission and the President's Airport Commission.

== Career ==
Johnston lead the post-war US Strategic Bombing Survey.

== Death ==
Johnston died, aged 86, on 9 August 1985 in Easton, Maryland, of a heart condition.
