= Petru Filip =

Romanian politician

Vice President of the Senate of Romania
- Incumbent
- Assumed office 8 September 2010

Senator of Romania
- Incumbent
- Assumed office 2008

Mayor of Oradea
- In office 2000–2007
- In office 1992–1996

Personal details
- Party: Social Democratic Party (PSD) (from 2012)
- Other political affiliations: Democratic Liberal Party (PDL) (until 2012); Democratic Party (PD)
- Spouse: Valeria
- Children: 1
- Education: PhD in Engineering; PhD in Public Administration
- Occupation: Politician
- Profession: Engineer

Petru Filip (Romanian pronunciation: [ˈpetru ˈfilip]; born 23 January 1955 in Slobozia, Romania) is a Romanian politician and member of the Social Democratic Party (PSD). Since 2008, he has been a member of the Senate, representing Bihor County.

== Biography ==
Filip served as mayor of Oradea (1992–1996, 2000–2007). He and his wife Valeria, a medical doctor, have one daughter.

Filip holds two PhD degrees, one in engineering and the second in public administration. For the latter of the two subjects he is holding a chair at the "Agora" University in Oradea as an associate professor.

Elected as leader of the Bihor County chapter of the Democratic Party in 1998, he became vice-president of the National Permanent Bureau (BPN) of the same party in 2005. On April 30, 2010, Filip resigned from his position as chairman of the county party chapter.

He ended his third term as Mayor of Oradea prematurely.

Following a short career as an MEP, Filip returned to national politics in Romania, and in the late fall of 2008, he was elected Senator. He was assigned to the Committee for Public Administration, Territorial Planning and Environmental Protection, which he chaired until September 8, 2010, when he was elected vice president of the Senate. He was a member of the Democratic Liberal Party (PDL) until April 2012 when his defection to the PSD.

== See also ==
- List of mayors of Oradea
