= Șerban Valeca =

Romanian physician and politician (1956–2022)

Member of the Senate of Romania
- In office 19 December 2008 – 21 December 2020

Member of the Chamber of Deputies of Romania
- In office 22 February 2000 – December 2000

Personal details
- Born: Șerban Constantin Valeca; 23 June 1956 Bucharest, Romanian People's Republic
- Died: 15 May 2022 (aged 65) Ștefănești, Romania
- Party: Social Democratic Party (PSD)
- Education: Politehnica University of Bucharest
- Occupation: Physician

Șerban Constantin Valeca (23 June 1956–15 May 2022) was a Romanian politician. A member of the Social Democratic Party (PSD), he served in the Senate of Romania, from 2008 to 2020. He died in Ștefănești, Argeș on 15 May 2022 at the age of 65.
