= Standing Bureau of the Senate of Romania =

The Standing Bureau of the Senate consists of the President of the Senate, four vice-presidents, four secretaries, and four quaestors. The President of the Standing Bureau also serves as the President of the Senate. The President is elected, by secret ballot, for the duration of the legislative period. All the other members are elected at the beginning of each parliamentary session.

The functions are distributed through the political groups respecting the proportions of the political composition of the Senate.

At the moment both Chambers of Parliament are constituted (the seats are validated, the Standing Bureau is elected, the political groups elect their Bureaus). Until the procedures are completed, the session is conducted by the eldest Senator (as President), aided by the two youngest Senators (as Secretaries).

== Members ==
Current members
President	Alina Ştefania Gorghiu	PNL	June 29, 2022
Vice-presidents	Alina Ştefania Gorghiu	PNL	June 29, 2022
Vice-presidents	Robert Marius Cazanciuc	PSD	November 23, 2021
Vice-presidents	Paul Stănescu	PSD	November 23, 2021
Vice-presidents	Virgil Guran	PNL	February 1, 2022
Secretaries	Ion Mocioalcă	PSD	November 23, 2021
Secretaries	Eugen Pîrvulescu	PNL	December 22, 2020
Secretaries	Ion Narcis Mircescu	USR	February 1, 2022
Secretaries	Sorin Lavric	AUR	December 22, 2020
Quaestors	Marius Alexandru Dunca	PSD	November 23, 2021
Quaestors	Cristina Mariana Stocheci	PSD	February 1, 2022
Quaestors	Sergiu Cosmin Vlad	USR	December 22, 2020
Quaestors	Attila László	UDMR/RMDSZ	December 22, 2020
