= Constantin Coandă =

Romanian general and politician (1857–1932)

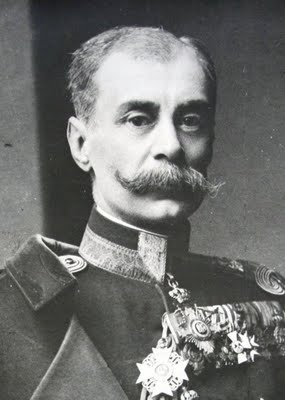

26th Prime Minister of Romania
- In office 24 October 1918 – 29 November 1918
- Monarch: Ferdinand I
- Preceded by: Alexandru Marghiloman
- Succeeded by: Ion I. C. Brătianu

24th President of the Senate of Romania
- In office 18 July 1926 – 5 June 1927
- Monarch: Ferdinand I
- Preceded by: Constantin I. Nicolaescu
- Succeeded by: Constantin I. Nicolaescu
- In office 22 June 1920 – 22 January 1922
- Monarch: Ferdinand I
- Preceded by: Paul Bujor
- Succeeded by: Mihail Pherekyde

Personal details
- Born: 4 March 1857 Craiova, Wallachia
- Died: 30 September 1932 (aged 75) Bucharest, Kingdom of Romania
- Spouse: Aïda Danet
- Children: 7 children (among them Henri Coandă)

Military service
- Branch/service: Romanian Land Forces
- Rank: General de corp de armată

Constantin Coandă (4 March 1857 – 30 September 1932) was a Romanian general and politician who briefly served as Prime Minister of the Kingdom of Romania in 1918.

== Biography ==
Constantin Coandă was born in Craiova. He reached the rank of general in the Romanian Army, and later became a mathematics professor at the National School of Bridges and Roads in Bucharest. Among his seven children was Henri Coandă, the discoverer of the Coandă effect.

During World War I, for a short time (24 October – 29 November 1918), he was the Prime Minister of Romania and the Foreign Affairs Minister. He participated in the signing of the Treaty of Neuilly between the Allies of World War I and Bulgaria.

On 8 December 1920, during his term as President of the Senate of Romania (representing Alexandru Averescu's People's Party), he was badly wounded by a bomb set up by the terrorist and anarchist Max Goldstein.

== Military functions ==
- Platoon commander in the 1st Artillery Regiment (1877 – 1883)
- Positions in military education at the Bucharest School of Artillery, Engineering and Naval Officers and at the Superior School of War
- Command and staff functions
- Commander of the 2nd Artillery Regiment
- Commander of the 5th Army Corps
- Secretary General of the Ministry of War
- Commander of the Bucharest Citadel
- Military attaché in Berlin, Vienna and Paris
- Director of the Artillery Department of the Ministry of War
- Head of department in the General Staff
- Inspector General of Artillery.

== Other positions ==
- Teacher at the Bucharest Bridge and Roads School
- Delegate to the International Conference in The Hague
- Military and diplomatic attaché near the Quarter of Tsar Nicholas II (1916 – 1918)
- Minister of Industry (20 March – 14 July 1926)
- Minister Secretary of State (10 August 1926 – 4 June 1927) .

== Writings ==
- Artillery Course (1884 – 1885)
- Projectiles and Missiles (1884).

== Death ==
Constantin Coandă died on 30 September 1932, aged 75, in Bucharest.
