= Ion Mitilineu =

Romanian diplomat

Minister of Foreign Affairs of Romania
- In office 30 March 1926 – 3 June 1927
- Monarch: Ferdinand I of Romania
- Preceded by: Ion G. Duca
- Succeeded by: Barbu Știrbey

Personal details
- Born: 28 September 1868
- Died: 11 June 1946 (aged 77)

Ion Mitilineu (28 September 1868 – 11 June 1946) was a Romanian diplomat who served as the Minister of Foreign Affairs of Romania in 1926–1927.

== Life and career ==
Mitilineu was appointed the Minister of Foreign Affairs of Romania on 30 March 1926, when Alexandru Averescu took the office of Prime Minister of Romania. Mitilineu was a part of Romanian diplomatic advance in efforts to reestablish good relations with European states and sign military cooperation agreements with neighbors. Prime Minister Averescu had already met with the Italian leader Benito Mussolini in 1924 and was interested in close cooperation with Italy. During Mitilineu's term in office, Romanian-Italian relations significantly improved and in September 1926, friendship treaty between two states was signed.

Mitilineu also developed good relations Czechoslovakia and Yugoslavia through the Little Entente alliance against potential irredentist threats from Hungary. He is considered one of the most successful foreign ministers of Romania. In domestic politics, he also tried to unify the Peasant's Party to create an anti-Liberal bloc in Romania.

Mitilineu died on 11 June 1946, aged 77.

== See also ==
- Little Entente
- Foreign relations of Romania
