= Henri Coandă =

Romanian inventor (1886–1972)

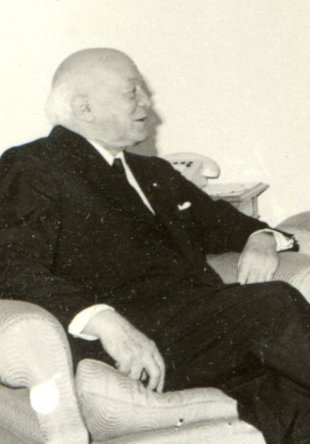
- Coandă in 1967
- Born: Henri Marie Coandă; 7 June 1886; Bucharest, Kingdom of Romania
- Died: 25 November 1972 (aged 86); Bucharest, Socialist Republic of Romania
- Education: Technische Universität Berlin; Montefiore Institute
- Occupations: Engineer, physicist, inventor
- Known for: Coandă effect, aeronautical engineering
- Parent(s): Constantin Coandă (father); Aida Danet (mother)

Henri Marie Coandă (Romanian pronunciation: [ɑ̃ˈri ˈko̯andə]; 7 June 1886 – 25 November 1972) was a Romanian inventor, aerodynamics pioneer, and builder of an experimental aircraft, the Coandă-1910, which never flew. He invented a great number of devices, designed a "flying saucer" and discovered the Coandă effect of fluid dynamics.

In the 1950s, Coandă inflated his importance in aviation history, describing falsely how he had invented the air-breathing jet engine and incorporated that design into the Coandă-1910 aircraft. However, his ducted engine design, the "turbo-propulseur", was described in its patent as working the same way with either water or air running through.

== Life ==
=== Early life ===
Born in Bucharest, Coandă was the second child of a large family. His father was General Constantin Coandă, a mathematics professor at the National School of Bridges and Roads. His mother, Aida Danet, was the daughter of French physician Gustave Danet, and was born in Brittany. Coandă recalled later in life that beginning from childhood he was fascinated by the miracle of wind.

Coandă attended Elementary school at the Petrache Poenaru Communal School in Bucharest, then (1896) Began his secondary school career at the Liceu Sf. Sava (Saint Sava National College). After three years (1899), his father, who desired a military career for him, had him transferred to the Military High School in Iaşi where he required four additional years to complete high-school. He graduated in 1903 with the rank of sergeant major, and he continued his studies at the School of Artillery, Military, and Naval Engineering in Bucharest. Sent with an artillery regiment to Germany (1904), he enrolled in the Technische Hochschule in Charlottenburg, Berlin.

Coandă graduated as an artillery officer, but he was more interested in the technical problems of flight. In 1905, he built a missile-aeroplane for the Romanian Army. He continued his studies (1907–08) at the Montefiore Institute in Liège, Belgium, where he met Gianni Caproni. In 1908 Coandă returned to Romania to serve as an active officer in the Second Artillery Regiment. His inventor's spirit did not comport well with military discipline and he obtained permission to leave the army, after which he took advantage of his renewed freedom to take a long automobile trip to Isfahan, Teheran, and Tibet.

=== Aviation activities in France ===
Upon his return in 1909, he travelled to Paris, where he enrolled in the newly founded École Nationale Supérieure d'Ingénieurs en Construction Aéronautique (now the École Nationale Supérieure de l'Aéronautique et de l'Espace, also known as SUPAERO). One year later (1910) he graduated at the head of the first class of aeronautical engineers.

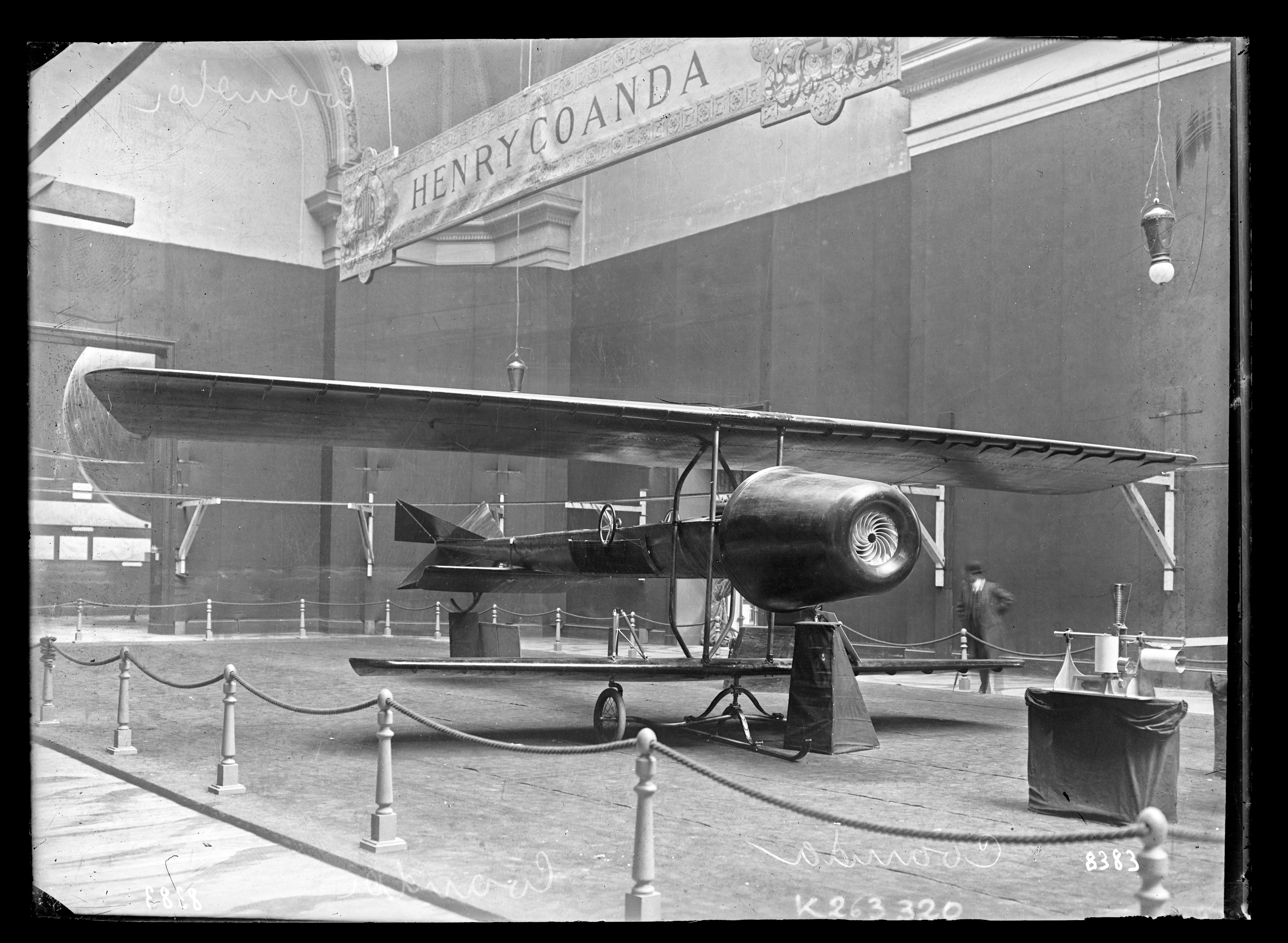
Coandă-1910 airplane

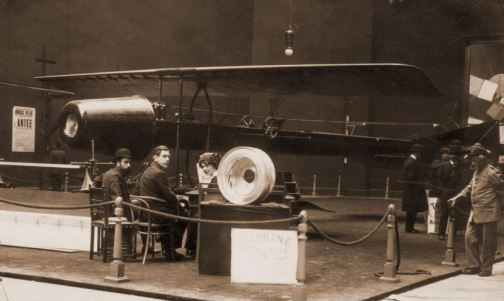
Coandă-1910 airplane with the turbo-propulseur on separate display

In 1910, in the workshop of Gianni Caproni, he designed and built an aircraft known as the Coandă-1910, which he displayed publicly at the second International Aeronautic Salon in Paris that year. The aircraft used a 4-cylinder piston engine to power a rotary compressor which was intended to propel the craft by a combination of suction at the front and airflow out the rear instead of using a propeller.

Contemporary sources describe the Coandă-1910 as incapable of flight. Years later, after others had developed jet technology, Coandă started making claims that it was a motorjet, and that it actually flew. According to Charles Gibbs-Smith: "There was never any idea of injecting fuel; the machine never flew; it was never destroyed on test; and Flight noted that it was sold to a Monsieur Weyman." Gibbs-Smith continued, "The claim said that after a disastrous crash (which never happened) Coandă wished to begin a 'second aircraft', but 'his funds were exhausted.' Within a year he was ... exhibiting (in October 1911) a brand new propeller-driven machine at the Reims Concours Militaire..." Other aviation writers accepted Coandă's story of his flight tests with the Coandă-1910.

Coandă's colleague at Huyck Corporation, G. Harry Stine—a rocket scientist, author and "the father of American model rocketry"—stated in his book The Hopeful Future that "there were several jet-propelled aircraft in existence at an early time-the Coandă-1910 jet and the 1938 Caproni Campini N.1, the pure jet aircraft flight was made in Germany in 1938". Rolf Sonnemann and Klaus Krug from the University of Technology of Dresden, mentioned in passing in their 1987 book Technik und Technikwissenschaften in der Geschichte (Technology and Technical Sciences in History) that the Coandă-1910 was the world's first jet.

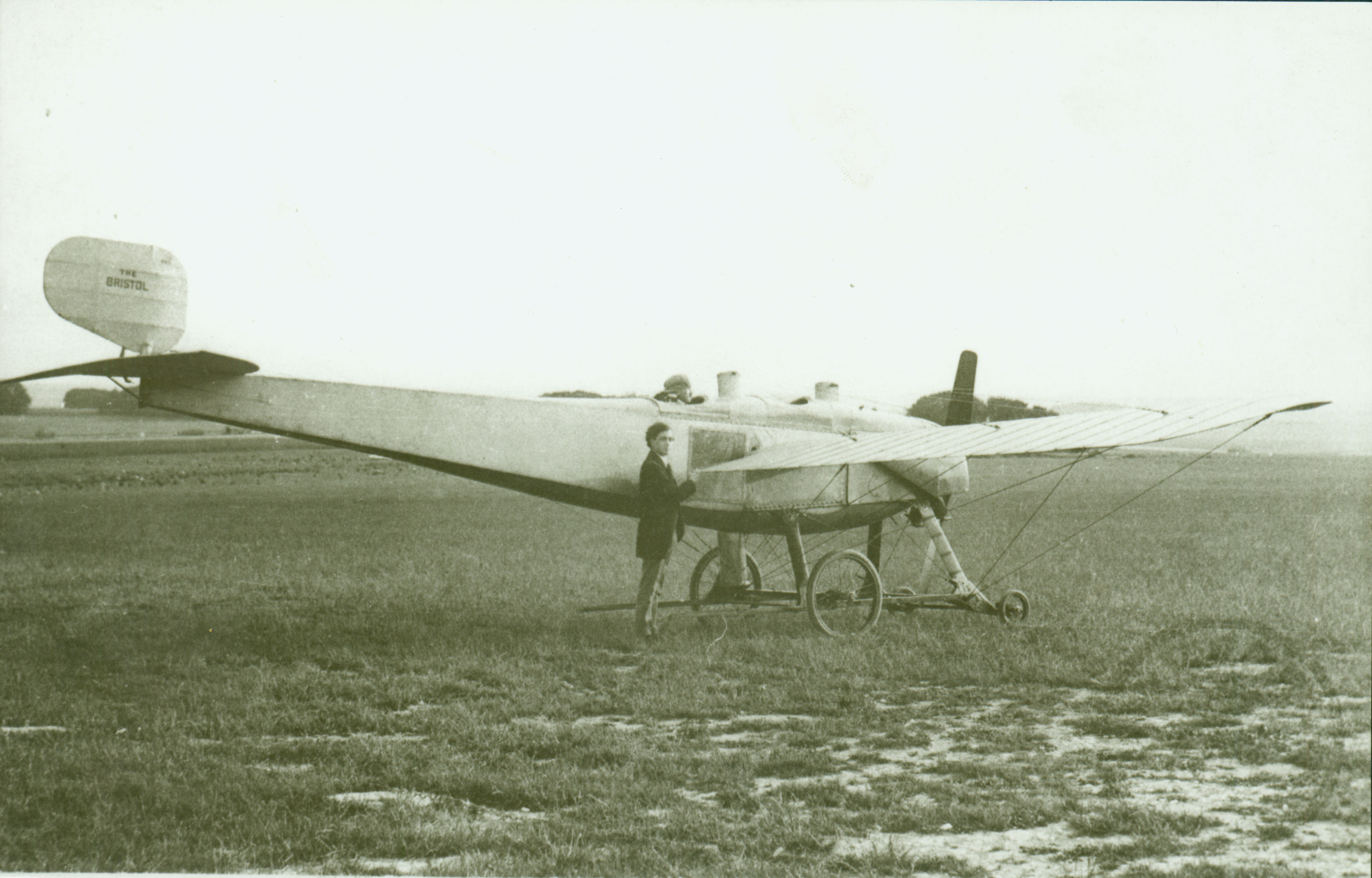
1912 Bristol-Coanda monoplane

Between 1911 and 1914, he worked as technical manager of the Bristol Aeroplane Company in the United Kingdom, where he designed several aeroplanes known as the Bristol-Coanda Monoplanes. In 1912 one of these aircraft won a prize at the British Military Aeroplane Competition.

In 1915, he returned to France where, working during World War I for Delaunay-Belleville in Saint-Denis, he designed and built three different models of propeller aeroplane, including the Coandă-1916, with two propellers mounted close to the tail. This design was to be reprised in the 1950s Sud Aviation Caravelle transport aeroplane, for which Coandă was a technical consultant.

In the years between the wars, he continued travelling and inventing. In 1934 he was granted a French patent related to the Coandă Effect. During early 1930 he used the same principle as the basis for the design of a disc-shaped aircraft called Aerodina Lenticulară (lens-shaped aerodyne), a "flying saucer" shaped aircraft that used an unspecified source of high-pressure gases to flow through a ring-shaped vent system. In 1936 Coandă applied for a patent for his design. No practical full-scale version was built.

=== World War II ===
Coanda spent World War II in occupied France where he worked for the Nazis to help their war effort by developing the turbopropulseur (turbopropeller) drive system from his 1910 biplane into a propulsion system for snow sleds. The German contract concluded after one year, yielding no plans for production.

=== Later work ===
Coandă's research on the Coandă effect was of interest post-war and became the basis for several investigations of entrained or augmented flow. A small stream of a high-velocity fluid could be used to generate a greater mass flow, at lower velocity. Although eventually unsuccessful for aircraft propulsion, this effect has been widely used on a smaller scale, from packaging machinery for small pills through to the Dyson Air Multiplier bladeless fan.

In 1969, during the early years of the Ceauşescu era, he returned to spend his last days in his native Romania, where he served as director of the Institute for Scientific and Technical Creation (INCREST) and in 1971 reorganized, along with professor Elie Carafoli, the Department of Aeronautical Engineering of the Polytechnic University of Bucharest, spinning it off from the Department of Mechanical Engineering.

Coandă died in Bucharest on 25 November 1972 at the age of 86. He is buried at Bellu cemetery.

== Honours and awards ==
- 1965: At the International Automation Symposium in New York, Coandă received the Harry Diamond Laboratories Award.
- He received an Honorary Fellowship of the Royal Aeronautical Society in 1971
- Bucharest's Henri Coandă International Airport is named after him.
- Award and Grand Gold Medal "Vielles Tiges".
- UNESCO Award for Scientific Research
- The Medal of French Aeronautics, Order of Merit, and Commander ring

== Inventions, and discoveries ==
- 1910: The Coandă-1910, an experimental aircraft powered by a ducted fan.
- 1911: An aircraft powered by two engines driving a single propeller – the configuration cancelled the torque of the engines.
- He invented a new decorative material for use in construction, beton-bois; one prominent example of its use is the Palace of Culture, in Iaşi.
- 1926: Working in Romania, Coandă developed a device to detect liquids under ground, useful in petroleum prospecting. Shortly thereafter, in the Persian Gulf region, he designed a system for offshore oil drilling.
- The most famous of Coandă's discoveries is the Coandă Effect. After more than 20 years studying this phenomenon along with his colleagues, Coandă described what Albert Metral was later to name the "Coandă Effect". This effect has been utilized in many aeronautical inventions. See Coanda Effect#Applications
- A modular system of sea water desalination and transformation to fresh water, based on solar energy, a clean, ecological and adaptable system.

== See also ==
- History of aviation
- Early flying machines
- List of firsts in aviation
- List of aviation pioneers

== Bibliography ==
- Stine, G. H., "The Rises and Falls of Henri-Marie Coanda", Air & Space Smithsonian, Sept. 1989
- Dr Henri Coanda Flight International, 13 January 1973, p. 76
- Caidin, Martin (May 1956). "The Coanda Story". Flying. Vol. 58, no. 5. pp. 32–33, 50, 54, 56–58. ISSN 0015-4806.
