= Senate of Romania =

Upper house of the Parliament of Romania

Senate Senat
- 10th legislature
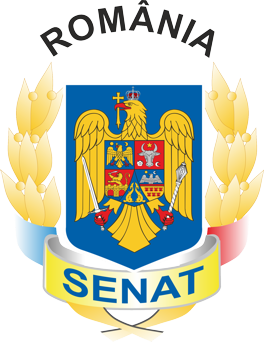

Type
- Type: Upper house of the Parliament of Romania

History
- Founded: 1864

Leadership
- President: Mircea Abrudean, PNL since 24 June 2025

Structure
- Seats: 134 (+2 vacant)
- Political groups: Government (40): PSD (40); Supported by (40): PNL (27) (Note: PNL (23); Independent (4)); UDMR (10); Independents (3) (Note: PACE (3)); Opposition (54): AUR (30); USR (18); Independents (6)
- Committees: 15: Committee for legal affairs, appointments, discipline, immunities and validations; Committee on Budget, finance, banking and capital market; Commission for economy, industry and services; Committee on Agriculture, Forestry and Rural Development; Committee on Foreign Affairs; Committee on public administration, the territory and environmental protection; Commission for defense, public order and national security; Commission for work, family and social protection; Committee for Education, Science, Youth and Sports; Committee on Public Health; Committee for culture, art and media information in the table; Commission on Human Rights, religious and minority; Committee on Equal Opportunities; Commission for privatization and management of state assets; Committee on research abuses, corruption and petitions

Elections
- Voting system: 1992–2008; 2016–present: Closed list, D'Hondt method; 2008–2016: nominal vote, mixed member proportional representation
- First election: 24–25 November 1864 20 May 1990
- Last election: 1 December 2024
- Next election: On or before 26 November 2028

Meeting place
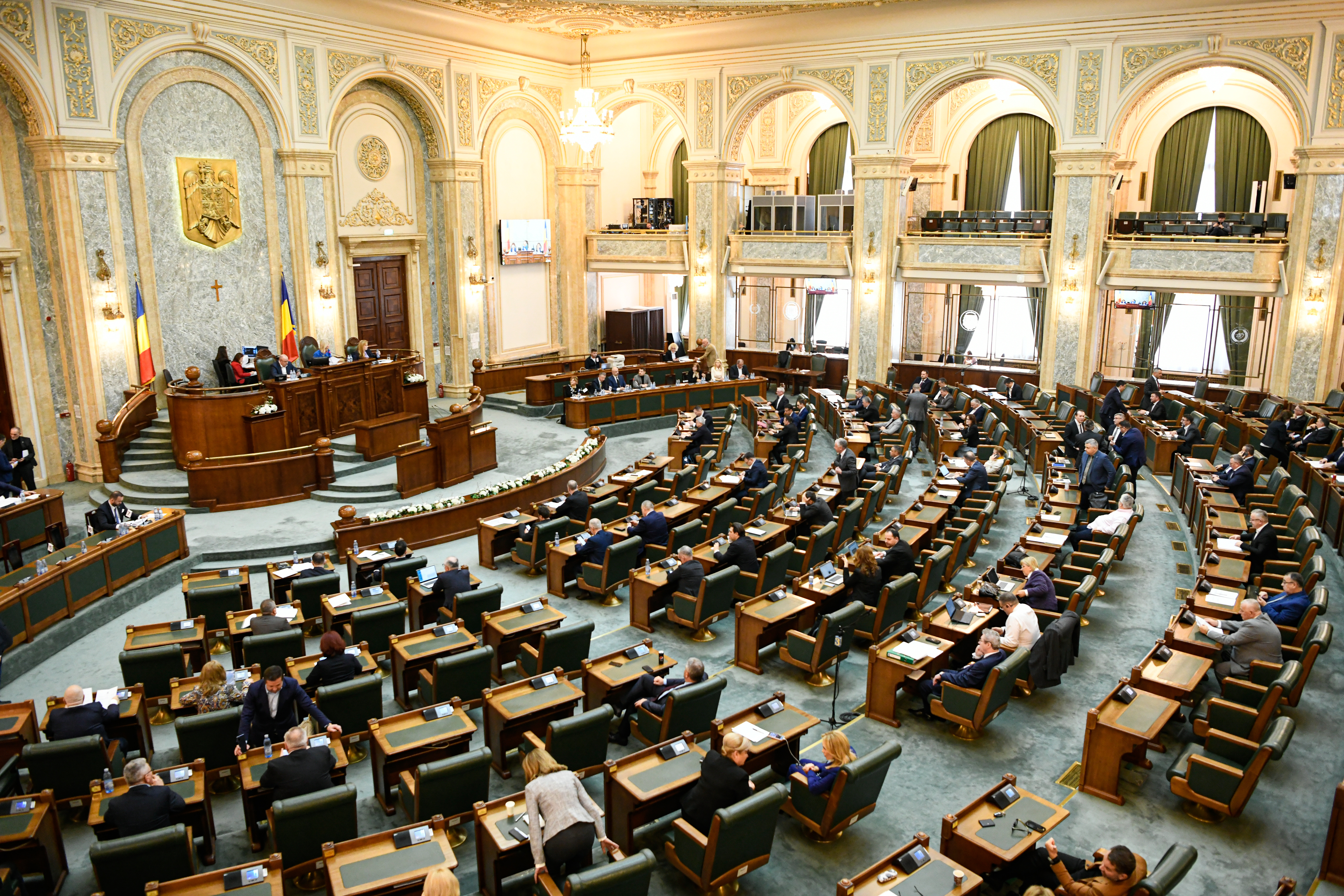
- Palace of the Parliament, Bucharest
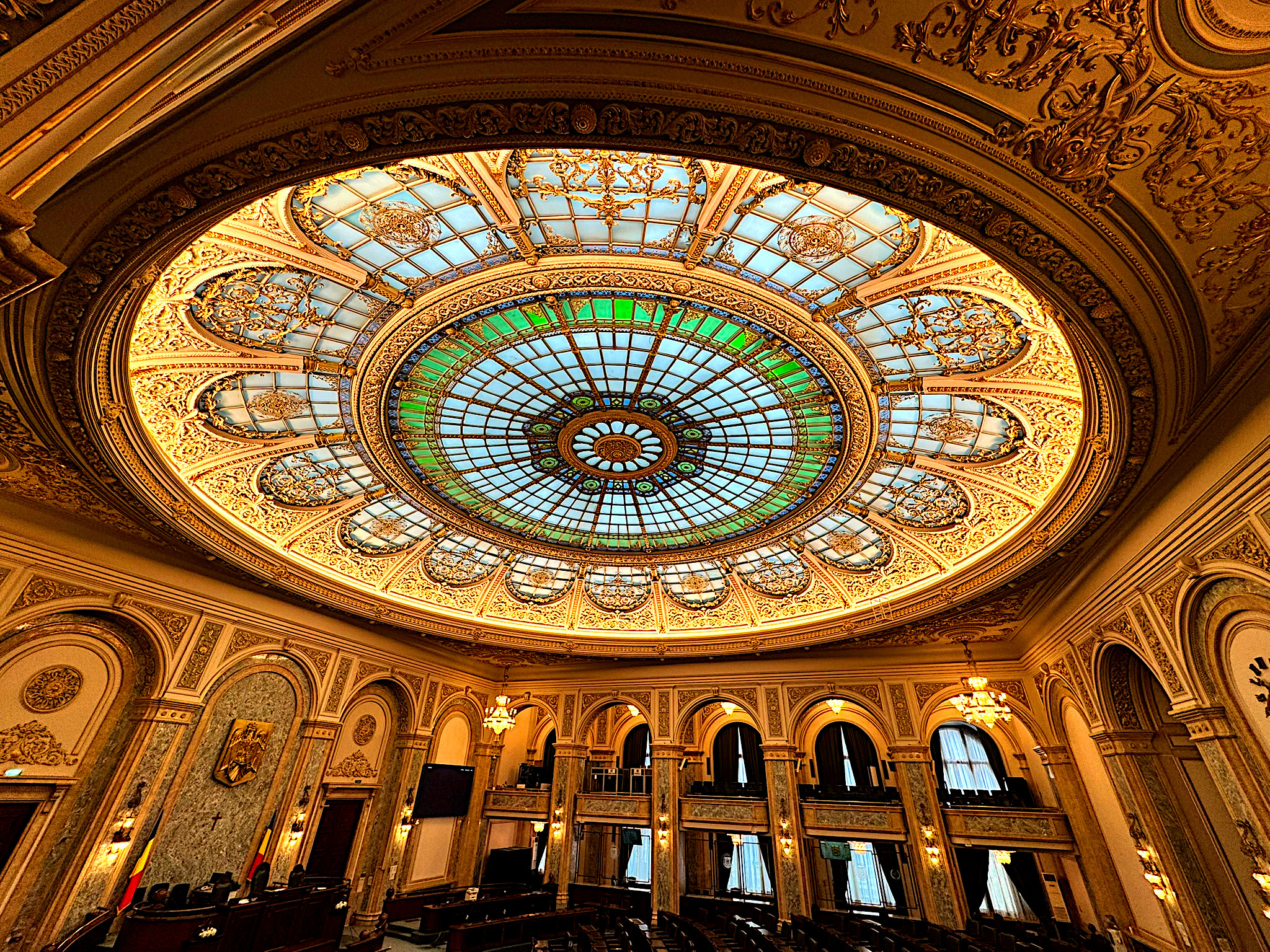
- Glass ceiling

Website
- www.senat.ro

The Senate (Romanian: Senat) is the upper house in the bicameral Parliament of Romania. It has 136 seats (before the 2016 parliamentary election the total number of elected representatives was 176), to which members are elected by direct popular vote using party-list proportional representation in 43 electoral districts (the 41 counties, the city of Bucharest plus 1 constituency for the Romanians living abroad), to serve four-year terms.

== History ==
=== First Senate (1859–1940) ===
The parliamentary history of Romania is seen as beginning in May 1831 in Wallachia, where a constitution called Regulamentul Organic ("Organic Statute") was promulgated by the Russian Empire and adopted. In January 1832 it came into force in Moldavia also. This laid the foundations for the parliamentary institution in the two Romanian principalities. At the Congress of Paris of 1856, Russia gave up to Moldavia the left bank of the mouth of the Danube, including part of Bessarabia, and also gave up its claim to be the protector of Christians in the Ottoman Empire. Moldavia and Wallachia, while remaining under the suzerainty of the Ottomans, were recognized as quasi-independent self-governing principalities under the protection of the other European Powers.

The Paris Convention of 19 August 1858 promulgated Statutul Dezvoltător ("Expanding Statute"), to introduce a bicameral parliament, with an upper house named in Romanian Corpul Ponderator ("Moderating Body"). This was later renamed the Senat. A formal Union of the two principalities came in 1859. On the initiative of Alexandru Ioan Cuza, a plebiscite in 1864 enlarged the principle of national representation.

The 1866 Constitution of Romania proclaimed constitutional monarchy as Romania's form of government, on the basis of national sovereignty and the separation of powers. Legislative power was to be exercised by the new Prince (Carol I of Romania) and a bi-cameral parliament, with an Assembly of Deputies and a Senate.

On 9 May 1877, the Declaration of Romania's independence was read under the dome of the Romanian Parliament.

The 1923 Constitution, approved by both houses of parliament in May 1923, again entrusted legislative power to the Senate, the Assembly of Deputies, and the King. The constitution instituted the membership by right (senator de drept) in the Senate for:

- The heir to the throne;
- Metropolitan bishops and diocesan bishops of the Orthodox and Greek-Catholic churches;
- Heads of state-recognised religious bodies;
- The president of the Romanian Academy;
- Former presidents of the Council of Ministers;
- Former ministers with at least six years' seniority;
- Former presidents of either legislative chamber who held this function for at least eight ordinary sessions;
- Former senators and deputies elected to at least ten legislatures, irrespective of their duration;
- Former presidents of the High Court of Cassation and Justice;
- Reserve and retired generals;
- Former presidents of the National Assemblies at Chișinău, Cernăuți, and Alba Iulia, which previously proclaimed their respective provinces' union with Romania in 1918 (see Union of Transylvania with Romania, Union of Bessarabia with Romania).

Additionally, the Senate included an elective element, chosen by corporatist electoral colleges, including the chambers of commerce, industry, and agriculture, as well as university professors.

In February 1938, amid the political crisis which soon led to the Second World War, King Carol II imposed a more authoritarian monarchy. Under the Constitution of 1938, Parliament lost some of its main powers. The Senate was to be composed of members appointed by the King, members by right, and members elected in single-member electoral areas, in the same manner as Assembly members. The proportion of appointed and elected members was to be equal, while senators by right still had to meet the conditions set out in the 1923 Constitution.

=== Suspension and abolition (1940–1946) ===
In September 1940, after the abdication of King Carol, the National Legionary State suspended the parliament but itself lasted less than five months. It was succeeded by Ion Antonescu's military dictatorship and the parliament remained suspended.

After the royal coup of 23 August 1944, on 15 July 1946 the government controlled by the Romanian Communist Party (PCR) issued an electoral law that re-organized the parliament as a single legislative body, called the Assembly of Deputies, thus disestablishing the Senate. Under the 1948 constitution this became the Great National Assembly, a relatively impotent body subordinate to the power of the Romanian Communist Party (PCR).

=== Second Senate (1990-present) ===
The Romanian Revolution of 1989 opened the way to restoring pluralistic representative democracy. Under the country's new post-communist Constitution of 1991, approved by a national referendum in 1991, Romania returned to a bicameral parliamentary system, in which the Senate is an elected body.

A referendum on modifying the size and structure of the Parliament from the current bicameral one with 137 senators and 334 deputies to a unicameral one with a maximum of 300 seats was held on 22 November 2009, at the same time as the first round of the 2009 presidential election. The electors approved by a percentage of 77.78% (50.95% turnout) the adoption of a unicameral Parliament, however as of 2026 the necessary constitutional changes to achieve this have not been put into effect.

== Former locations ==
The first Romanian Senate functioned between 1864 and 1869 in a small building, which still exists today on the Calea Șerban Vodă. Once the new building of the University of Bucharest was inaugurated, the Senate moved in a bigger hall in that building. Between 1929 and 1940, it was temporarily housed in a building on the Regina Elisabeta Boulevard, while a new Palace of the Senate was to be built in today's Națiunile Unite Square. This building was never finished.

After the Romanian Revolution of 1989, the Senate was housed in the "Palace of the Senate" (Romanian: Palatul Senatului), located in Revolution Square. That U-shaped structure was built from 1938 to 1941 under engineer Emil Prager's coordination, following the plans of architect Emil Nădejde. It was built for, and has briefly housed the Ministry of Internal Affairs, and from 1958 to 1989 it was the headquarters of the Central Committee of the Romanian Communist Party (PCR). During the Revolution, Romanian President Nicolae Ceaușescu and his wife Elena fled by helicopter from the roof of the building. In 2005, the senators moved into the Palace of the Parliament, joining their colleagues from the Chamber of Deputies. "Palatul Senatului" now houses the Ministry of Internal Affairs.

== Composition ==
=== 2024–2028 ===
Party	Election seating		+/–	Present seating	
Party	Seats	% (Note: Excluding vacant seats)		Seats	%
Social Democratic Party	36	26.87%	+2	38	28.36%
Alliance for the Union of Romanians	28	20.90%	—	28	20.90%
National Liberal Party	22	16.42%	—	22	16.42%
Save Romania Union	19	14.18%	—	19	14.18%
S.O.S. Romania	12	8.96%	–11	1 (Note: Sitting as unaffiliated senators)	0.75%
Democratic Union of Hungarians	10	7.46%	—	10	7.46%
Party of Young People	7	5.22%	–2	5	3.73%
PEACE – Romania First	—	—	+11	11	8.21%
Vacant	2		—	2	
TOTAL	134 (+2 vacant)		—	134 (+2 vacant)	

=== 2020–2024 ===
Seats in the Senate of Romania
Party	Election seating		Lost	Won	Present seating	
Party	Seats	%	Lost	Won	Seats	%
Social Democratic Party	47	34.55%	1	1	46	33.82%
National Liberal Party	41	30.14%	4	2	39	28.67%
Save Romania Union	25	18.38%	3	0	22	16.17%
Alliance for the Union of Romanians	14	10.29%	2	0	12	8.82%
Democratic Union of Hungarians in Romania	9	6.61%	0	0	9	6.61%
Force of the Right	—	—	0	3	3	2.20%
Social Liberal Humanist Party	—	—	0	1	1	0.73%
Romanian Nationhood Party	—	—	0	1	1	0.73%
Independents	—	—	4	4	2	1.47%
Vacant	—	—	0	1	1	0.73%
Total	136	100	—		136	100

=== 2016–2020 ===
Seats in the Senate of Romania
Party	Election seating		Lost	Won	End seating	
Party	Seats	%	Lost	Won	Seats	%
Social Democratic Party	67	49.26%	10	2	59	43.38%
National Liberal Party	30	22.05%	4	0	26	19.11%
Save Romania Union	13	9.55%	0	0	13	9.55%
Democratic Union of Hungarians in Romania	9	6.61%	1	1	9	6.61%
Alliance of Liberals and Democrats	9	6.61%	5	3	7	5.14%
People's Movement Party	8	5.88%	4	1	5	3.67%
Humanist Power Party	—	—	0	2	2	1.47%
Independents	—	—	0	15	15	11.02%
Total	136	100	—		136	100

=== 2008–2012 ===
In December 2008, the Democratic Liberal Party (PDL) and the political alliance established between the Social Democratic Party (PSD) and Conservative Party (PC) formed a coalition government.

Seats in the Senate of Romania, 6th legislature
Party	Election seating		Lost	Won	Present seating	
Party	Seats	%	Lost	Won	Seats	%
Democratic Liberal Party	51	37.22%	19	2	35	25.54%
Social Democratic Party	49	35.76%	15	3	40	29.19%
National Liberal Party	28	20.43%	16	4	27	19.70%
Democratic Union of Hungarians in Romania	9	6.57%	2	0	7	5.10%
National Union for the Progress of Romania	—	—	4	12	12	8.75%
Independents	—	—		2	2	1.45%
Vacant seats					14	—
**Total**	**137**	**100**	—		**137**	**100**

=== 2004–2008 ===
In the 2004 Romanian general election, held on 28 November 2004, the Justice and Truth Alliance (DA) won the greatest number of seats, even though no party won an outright majority. The President of the Senate for this legislature was Nicolae Văcăroiu, who was elected on 20 December 2004. Following his ad interim presidency of Romania, he delegated his attributions to the vice president Doru Ioan Tărăcilă. After Văcăroiu was sworn in as president of the Court of Accounts, Ilie Sârbu was elected as the new President of the Senate.

Until April 2007, the Justice and Truth Alliance governed in coalition with other minor parties. In April 2007, after the break-up of the Justice and Truth Alliance, the National Liberal Party (PNL) and the Democratic Alliance of Hungarians (UDMR/RMDSZ) formed a minority government coalition (highlighted in bold in the table below).

Party	% of seats	Seats
Social Democratic Party	31.4	43
**National Liberal Party**	16	22
Democratic Party	15.4	21
Greater Romania Party	13.1	18
Conservative Party	8.0	11
**Democratic Union of Hungarians in Romania**	7.3	10
Independents	8.8	12
**Total**	**100**	**137**

=== 2000–2004 ===
Elections to the Senate were held on 26 November 2000, in which the Social Democratic Party (then abbreviated PDSR) won an overall majority. Then President of the Senate of Romania was former Prime Minister (between 1992 and 1996) Nicolae Văcăroiu, who was elected in December 2000. The allocation of seats was as follows:

Party	% of seats	Seats
Social Democratic Party	46.43	65
Greater Romania Party	26.43	37
National Liberal Party	9.29	13
Democratic Party	9.29	13
Democratic Union of Hungarians in Romania	8.57	12
**Total**	**100**	**140**

== Presidents of the Senate (1990–present) ==
Last election of the President of Senate: 2024

The Standing Bureau of the Senate consists of the President of the Senate, four vice-presidents, four secretaries, and four quaestors. The President of the Standing Bureau also serves as the President of the Senate. The President is elected, by secret ballot, for the duration of the legislative period.

The political stance of the presidents of the upper house of the Parliament of Romania (after the development of a modern party system) is given by the following legend table:

PNL = National Liberal Party

(formerly the historical National Liberal Party between 1875 and 1947)

PNȚCD = Christian Democratic National Peasants' Party

(formerly the historical National Peasants' Party - PNȚ between 1926 and 1947)

FSN = National Salvation Front
PD/PDL = Democratic Party/Democratic Liberal Party
PSD = Social Democratic Party

(until 1992 National Salvation Front - FSN; until 1993 Democratic National Salvation Front - FDSN; until 2001 Party of Social Democracy in Romania - PDSR)

ALDE = Alliance of Liberals and Democrats

(until 2015 Liberal Reformist Party - PLR)

USR PLUS (Note: Also known as the 2020 USR-PLUS Alliance and initially written as USR-PLUS)/USR = Save Romania Union-Freedom, Unity and Solidarity Party/Save Romania Union

Ad interim (acting) officeholders are denoted by italics. The Rule of the Senate states that at the first standing of the house, the meeting is headed by the eldest senator and helped by the youngest senator. Those bear the title of Interim President of the Senate, and, as their term is very short (one or two days) are not listed. The interim officeholders listed have hold the office in different circumstances and for a longer time (i.e. for more than one or two days).

Elections	#	Name	Portrait	Born-Died	Took office	Left office	Party
Senate since 1990
1990	36	Alexandru Bârlădeanu		1911–1997	18 June 1990	16 October 1992	FSN
1992	37	Oliviu Gherman		1930–2020	22 October 1992	22 November 1996	FDSN/PDSR
1996	38	Petre Roman		1946–	27 November 1996	22 December 1999	PD
1996	39	Mircea Ionescu-Quintus		1917–2017	4 February 2000	30 November 2000	PNL
2000	40	Nicolae Văcăroiu		1943–	15 December 2000	30 November 2004	PDSR/PSD
2004	40	Nicolae Văcăroiu		1943–	30 November 2000	14 October 2008	PSD
2004	—	Doru-Ioan Tărăcilă (acting)		1951–	14 October 2008	28 October 2008	PSD
2004	41	Ilie Sârbu		1950–	28 October 2008	13 December 2008	PSD
2008	42	Mircea Geoană		1958–	19 December 2008	23 November 2011	PSD
2008	—	Petru Filip (acting)		1955–	23 November 2011	28 November 2011	PDL
2008	43	Vasile Blaga		1956–	28 November 2011	3 July 2012	PDL
2008	44	Crin Antonescu		1959–	3 July 2012	19 December 2012	PNL
2012	44	Crin Antonescu		1959–	19 December 2012	4 March 2014	PNL
2012	—	Cristian Dumitrescu (acting)		1955–	5 March 2014	10 March 2014	PSD
2012	45	Călin Popescu-Tăriceanu		1952–	10 March 2014	21 December 2016	Ind./PLR/ALDE
2016	45	Călin Popescu-Tăriceanu		1952–	21 December 2016	2 September 2019	ALDE
2016	—	Șerban Valeca (acting)		1956–2022	2 September 2019	10 September 2019	PSD
2016	46	Teodor Meleșcanu		1941–	10 September 2019	3 February 2020	Ind. with PSD support
2016	—	Titus Corlățean (acting)		1968–	3 February 2020	9 April 2020	PSD
2016	—	Robert Cazanciuc (acting)		1971–	9 April 2020	21 December 2020	PSD
2020	47	Anca Dragu		1972–	21 December 2020	23 November 2021	USR PLUS (Note: PLUS member)/USR
2020	48	Florin Cîțu		1972–	23 November 2021	29 June 2022	PNL
2020	—	Alina Gorghiu (acting)		1978–	29 June 2022	13 June 2023	PNL
2020	49	Nicolae Ciucă		1967–	13 June 2023	23 December 2024	PNL
2024	50	Ilie Bolojan		1969-	23 December 2024	23 June 2025	PNL
2024	51	Mircea Abrudean		1984–	24 June 2025	Incumbent	PNL

== Notable senators ==
- Michael I of Romania (November 1939 to September 1940), before becoming King and thereby acceding to the throne of the Kingdom of Romania for the second time during his second and last short-lived reign.
