= Second Maniu cabinet =

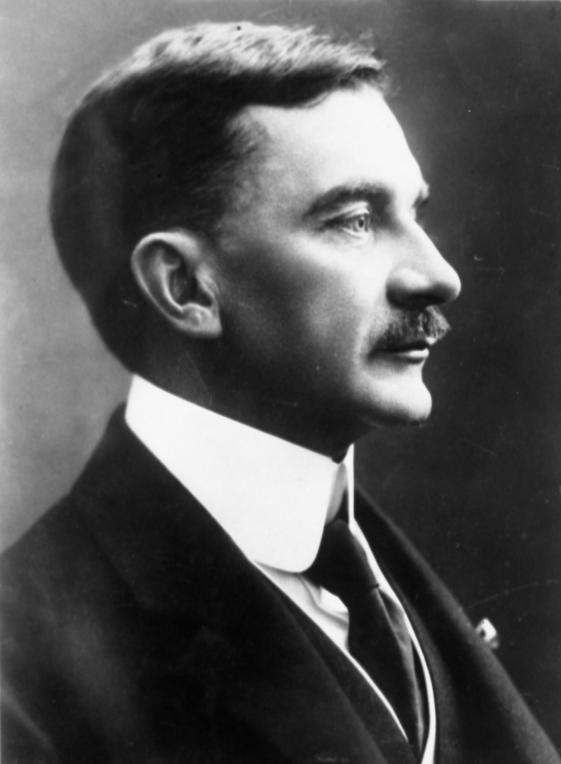
Iuliu Maniu

The second cabinet of Iuliu Maniu was the government of Romania from 13 June to 9 October 1930.

== Composition ==
The ministers of the cabinet were as follows:

- President of the Council of Ministers:

- Iuliu Maniu (13 June - 9 October 1930)

- Minister of the Interior:

- Alexandru Vaida-Voevod (13 June - 9 October 1930)

- Minister of Foreign Affairs:

- Gheorghe Mironescu (13 June - 9 October 1930)

- Minister of Finance:

- Mihai Popovici (13 June - 9 October 1930)

- Minister of Justice:

- Grigore Iunian (13 June - 9 October 1930)

- Minister of Public Instruction and Religious Affairs:

- Nicolae Costăchescu (13 June - 9 October 1930)

- Minister of War:

- Gen. Nicolae Condeescu (13 June - 9 October 1930)

- Minister of Agriculture and Property:

- Ion Mihalache (13 June - 9 October 1930)

- Minister of Industry and Commerce:

- Virgil Madgearu (13 June - 9 October 1930)

- Minister of Public Works and Communications:

- Mihail Manoilescu (13 June - 9 October 1930)

- Minister of Labour, Health, and Social Security:

- (interim) Pantelimon Halippa (13 June - 9 October 1930)

- Minister of State:

- Pantelimon Halippa (13 June - 9 October 1930)

| Preceded by First Mironescu cabinet | Cabinet of Romania; 13 June 1930 - 9 October 1930 | Succeeded by Second Mironescu cabinet |
