= First Maniu cabinet =

Historical government of Romania

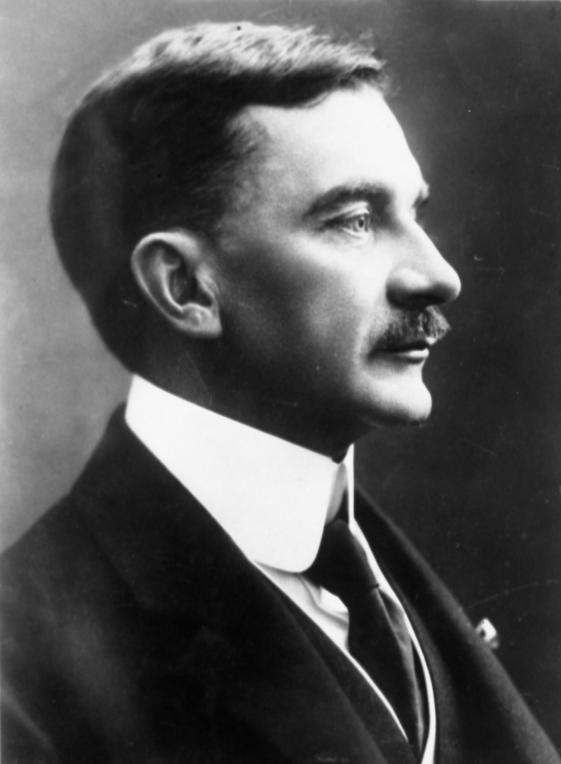
Iuliu Maniu

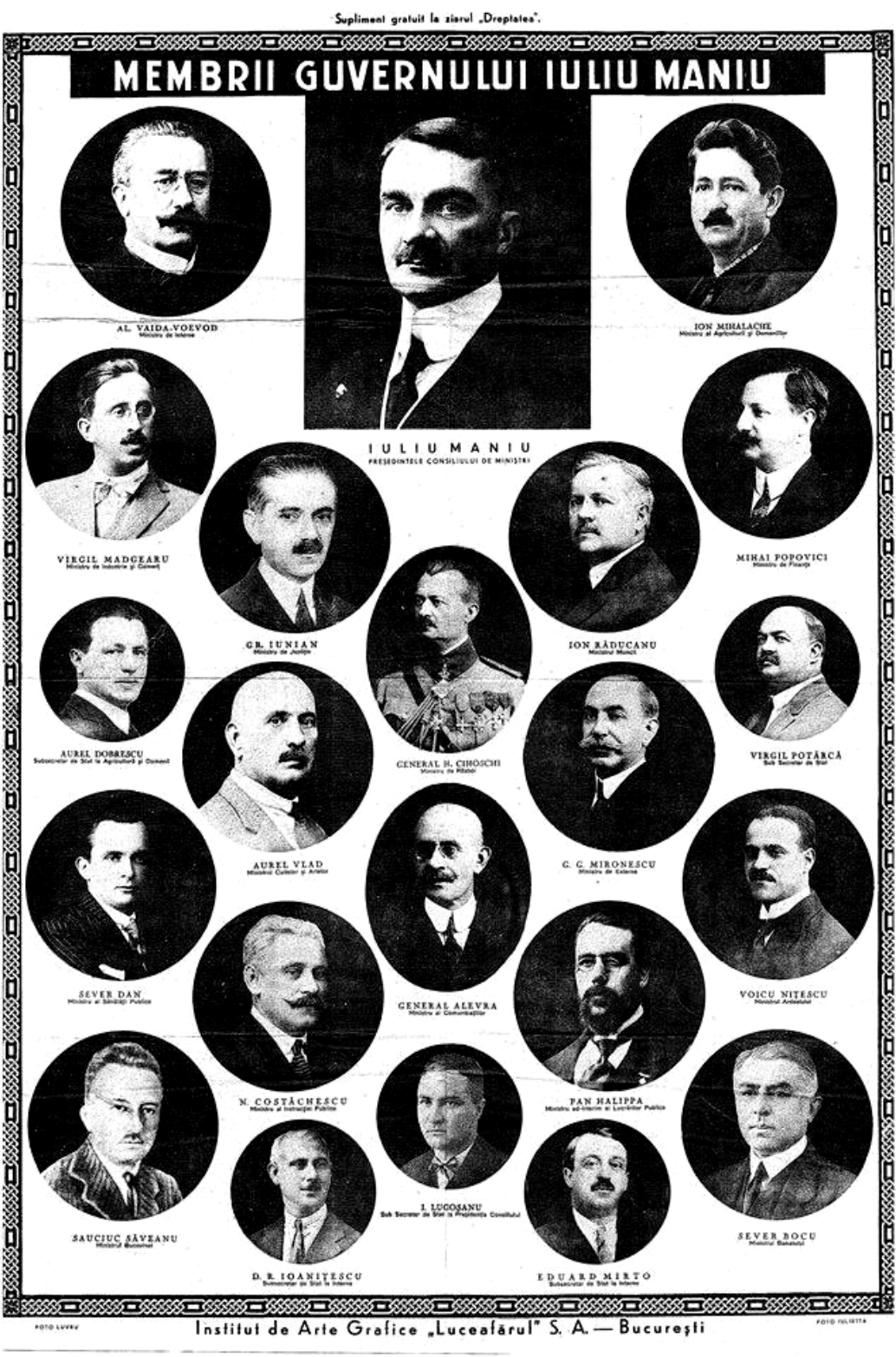
The members of the Maniu cabinet

The first cabinet of Iuliu Maniu was the government of Romania from 10 November 1928 to 6 June 1930.

== Composition ==
The ministers of the cabinet were as follows:

- President of the Council of Ministers:

- Iuliu Maniu (10 November 1928 – 6 June 1930)

- Minister of the Interior:

- Alexandru Vaida-Voevod (10 November 1928 – 6 June 1930)

- Minister of Foreign Affairs:

- George G. Mironescu (10 November 1928 – 6 June 1930)

- Minister of Finance:

- Mihai Popovici (10 November 1928 – 15 October 1929)
- (interim) Iuliu Maniu (15 – 26 October 1929)
- (interim) Virgil Madgearu (26 October – 14 November 1929)
- Virgil Madgearu (14 November 1929 – 6 June 1930)

- Minister of Justice:

- Grigore Iunian (10 November 1928 – 7 March 1930)
- Voicu Nițescu (7 March – 6 June 1930)

- Minister of Public Instruction:

- Nicolae Costăchescu (10 November 1928 – 14 November 1929)

- Minister of Religious Affairs and the Arts:

- Aurel Vlad (10 November 1928 – 14 November 1929)

- Minister of Public Instruction and Religious Affairs:

- Nicolae Costăchescu (14 November 1929 – 6 June 1930)

- Minister of War:

- Gen. Henri Cihoski (10 November 1928 – 5 April 1930)
- (interim) Iuliu Maniu (5 – 14 April 1930)
- Gen. Nicolae Condeescu (14 April 1930 – 6 June 1930)

- Minister of Agriculture and Property:

- Ion Mihalache (10 November 1928 – 6 June 1930)

- Minister of Industry and Commerce:

- Virgil Madgearu (10 November 1928 – 14 November 1929)
- Aurel Vlad (14 November 1929 – 7 March 1930)
- Eduard Mirto (7 March – 6 June 1930)

- Ministry of Labour, Social Insurance and Cooperation

- Ion Răducanu (10 November 1928 – 14 November 1929)

- Minister of Public Health and Social Welfare:

- Sever Dan (10 November 1928 – 14 November 1929)

- Minister of Labour, Health, and Social Security:

- Ion Răducanu (14 November 1929 – 6 June 1930)

- Minister of Public Works:

- (interim) Pantelimon Halippa (10 November 1928 – 14 November 1929)

- Minister of Communications:

- Gen. Nicolae Alevra (10 November 1928 – 15 October 1929)
- (interim) Voicu Nițescu (15 October – 14 November 1929)

- Minister of Public Works and Communications:

- (interim) Pantelimon Halippa (14 November 1929 – 6 June 1930)

- Ministers of State:

- Pantelimon Halippa (10 November 1928 – 14 November 1929)
- Sever Bocu (10 November 1928 – 14 November 1929)
- Voicu Nițescu (10 November 1928 – 14 November 1929)
- Teofil Sauciuc-Săveanu (10 November 1928 – 14 November 1929)

Preceded by Vintilă I. C. Brătianu cabinet	Cabinet of Romania; 10 November 1928 – 6 June 1930	Succeeded by First Mironescu cabinet
