= Second Mironescu cabinet =

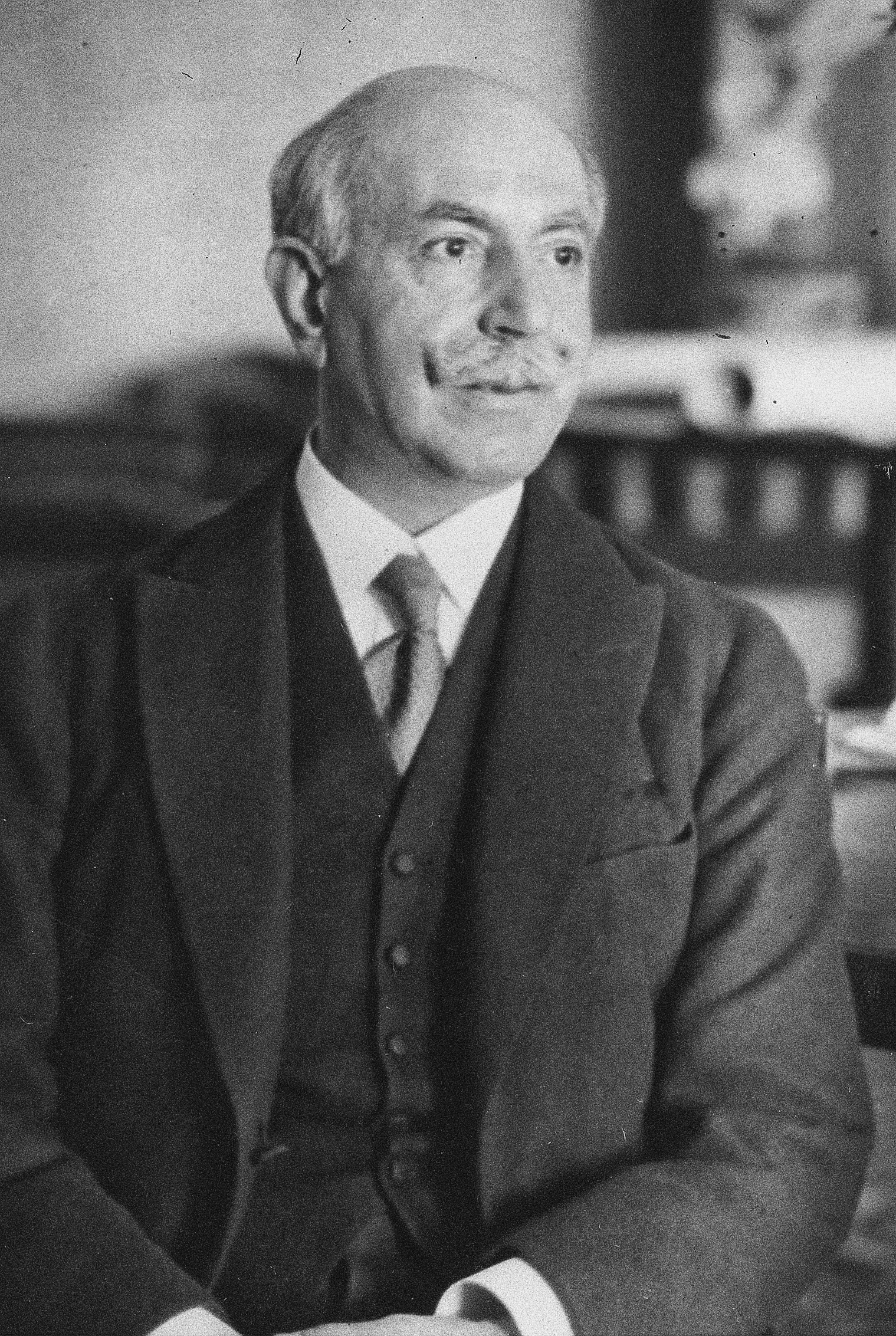
Gheorghe Mironescu

The second cabinet of Gheorghe Mironescu was the government of Romania from 10 October 1930 to 17 April 1931.

== Composition ==
The ministers of the cabinet were as follows:

- President of the Council of Ministers:

- Gheorghe Mironescu (10 October 1930 - 17 April 1931)

- Minister of the Interior:

- Ion Mihalache (10 October 1930 - 17 April 1931)

- Minister of Foreign Affairs:

- Gheorghe Mironescu (10 October 1930 - 17 April 1931)

- Minister of Finance:

- Mihai Popovici (10 October 1930 - 17 April 1931)

- Minister of Justice:

- Grigore Iunian (10 October - 19 November 1930)
- Voicu Nițescu (19 November 1930 - 17 April 1931)

- Minister of Public Instruction and Religious Affairs:

- Nicolae Costăchescu (10 October 1930 - 17 April 1931)

- Minister of the Army:

- Gen. Nicolae Condeescu (10 October 1930 - 17 April 1931)

- Minister of Agriculture and Property:

- Virgil Madgearu (10 October 1930 - 17 April 1931)

- Minister of Industry and Commerce:

- Mihail Manoilescu (10 October 1930 - 17 April 1931)

- Minister of Public Works and Communications:

- Voicu Nițescu (10 October - 19 November 1930)
- Ion Răducanu (19 November 1930 - 17 April 1931)

- Minister of Labour, Health, and Social Security:

- Emil Hațieganu (10 October 1930 - 17 April 1931)

- Minister of State:

- Pantelimon Halippa (10 October 1930 - 17 April 1931)

Preceded by Second Maniu cabinet	Cabinet of Romania; 10 October 1930 - 17 April 1931	Succeeded by Iorga cabinet
