= Third Maniu cabinet =

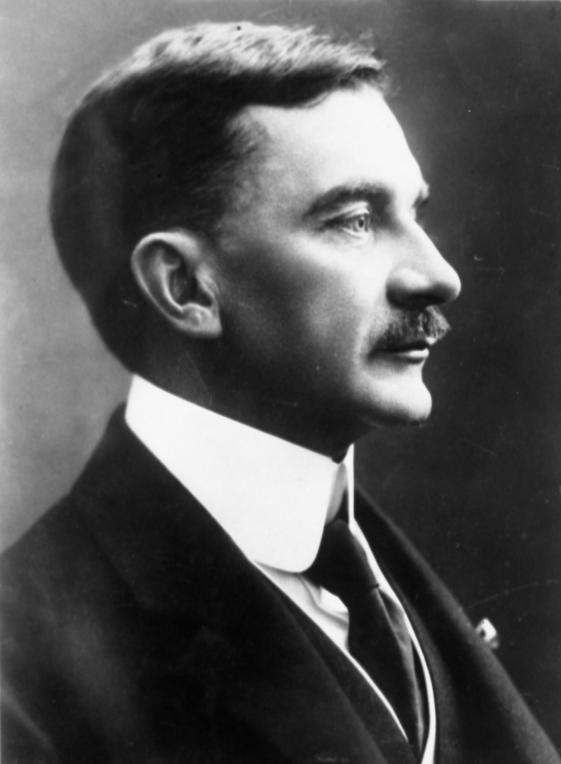
Iuliu Maniu

The third cabinet of Iuliu Maniu was the government of Romania from 20 October 1932 to 13 January 1933.

== Composition ==
The ministers of the cabinet were as follows:

- President of the Council of Ministers:

- Iuliu Maniu (20 October 1932 - 13 January 1933)

- Vice President of the Council of Ministers:

- Gheorghe Mironescu (20 October 1932 - 13 January 1933)

- Minister of the Interior:

- Ion Mihalache (20 October 1932 - 13 January 1933)

- Minister of Foreign Affairs:

- Nicolae Titulescu (20 October 1932 - 13 January 1933)

- Minister of Finance:

- Virgil Madgearu (20 October 1932 - 13 January 1933)

- Minister of Justice:

- Mihai Popovici (20 October 1932 - 13 January 1933)

- Minister of Public Instruction, Religious Affairs and the Arts:

- Dimitrie Gusti (20 October 1932 - 13 January 1933)

- Minister of National Defence:

- Gen. Nicolae Samsonovici (20 October 1932 - 13 January 1933)

- Minister of Agriculture and Property:

- Voicu Nițescu (20 October 1932 - 13 January 1933)

- Minister of Industry and Commerce:

- Ion Lugoșianu (20 October 1932 - 13 January 1933)

- Minister of Public Works and Communications:

- Eduart Mirto (20 October 1932 - 13 January 1933)

- Minister of Labour, Health, and Social Security:

- D. R. Ioanițescu (20 October 1932 - 13 January 1933)

- Ministers of State:

- Pantelimon Halippa (20 October 1932 - 13 January 1933)
- Teofil Sauciuc-Săveanu (20 October 1932 - 13 January 1933)
- Gheorghe Crișan (20 October 1932 - 13 January 1933)

Preceded by Third Vaida-Voevod cabinet	Cabinet of Romania; 20 October 1932 - 13 January 1933	Succeeded by Fourth Vaida-Voevod cabinet
