= Third Vaida-Voevod cabinet =

Romanian government (August–October 1932)

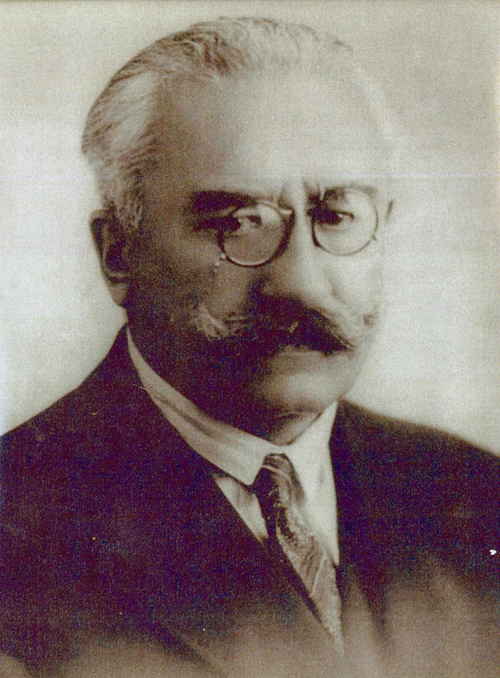
Alexandru Vaida-Voevod

The third cabinet of Alexandru Vaida-Voevod was the government of Romania from 11 August to 19 October 1932.

== Composition ==
The ministers of the cabinet were as follows:

- President of the Council of Ministers:

- Alexandru Vaida-Voevod (11 August - 19 October 1932)

- Minister of the Interior:

- Ion Mihalache (11 August - 19 October 1932)

- Minister of Foreign Affairs:

- Alexandru Vaida-Voevod (11 August - 19 October 1932)

- Minister of Finance:

- Gheorghe Mironescu (11 August - 19 October 1932)

- Minister of Justice:

- Mihai Popovici (11 August - 19 October 1932)

- Minister of Public Instruction, Religious Affairs, and the Arts:

- Dimitrie Gusti (11 August - 19 October 1932)

- Minister of National Defence:

- Gen. Nicolae Samsonovici (11 August - 19 October 1932)

- Minister of Agriculture and Property

- Voicu Nițescu (11 August - 19 October 1932)

- Minister of Industry and Commerce:

- Virgil Madgearu (11 August - 19 October 1932)

- Minister of Labour, Health, and Social Security:

- D. R. Ioanițescu (11 August - 19 October 1932)

- Minister of Public Works and Communications:

- Eduart Mirto (11 August - 19 October 1932)

- Ministers of State:

- Emil Hațieganu (11 August - 19 October 1932)

Preceded by Second Vaida-Voevod cabinet	Cabinet of Romania; 11 August 1932 - 19 October 1932	Succeeded by Third Maniu cabinet
