= Fourth Vaida-Voevod cabinet =

Romanian government official

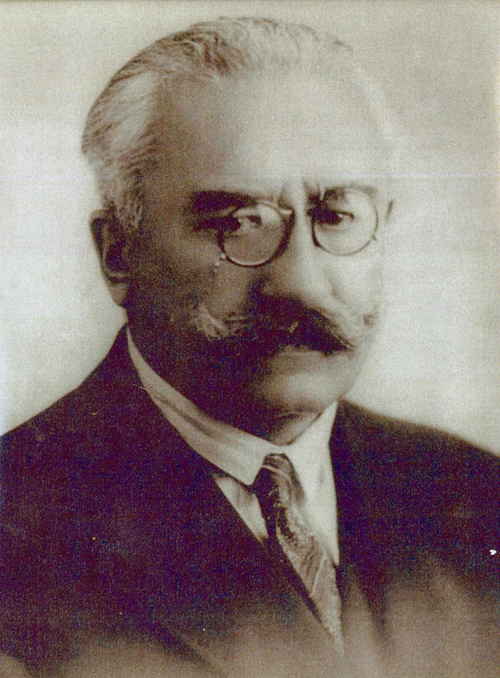
Alexandru Vaida-Voevod

The fourth cabinet of Alexandru Vaida-Voevod was the government of Romania from 14 January to 13 November 1933.

== Composition ==
The ministers of the cabinet were as follows:

- President of the Council of Ministers:

- Alexandru Vaida-Voevod (14 January - 13 November 1933)

- Vice President of the Council of Ministers and Minister of the Interior:

- Gheorghe Mironescu (14 January - 13 November 1933)

- Minister of Foreign Affairs:

- Nicolae Titulescu (14 January - 13 November 1933)

- Minister of Finance:

- Virgil Madgearu (14 January - 13 November 1933)

- Minister of Justice:

- Mihai Popovici (14 January - 13 November 1933)

- Minister of Public Instruction, Religious Affairs, and the Arts:

- Dimitrie Gusti (14 January - 13 November 1933)

- Minister of National Defence:

- Gen. Nicolae Samsonovici (14 January - 13 November 1933)

- Minister of Agriculture and Property

- Voicu Nițescu (14 January - 13 November 1933)

- Minister of Industry and Commerce:

- Ion Lugoșianu (14 January - 14 June 1933)
- Alexandru Vaida-Voevod (14 June - 13 November 1933)

- Minister of Labour, Health, and Social Security:

- D. R. Ioanițescu (14 January - 13 November 1933)

- Minister of Public Works and Communications:

- Eduart Mirto (14 January - 13 November 1933)

- Ministers of State:

- Pantelimon Halippa (14 January - 13 November 1933)
- Emil Hațieganu (14 January - 13 November 1933)

Preceded by Third Maniu cabinet	Cabinet of Romania; 14 January 1933 - 13 November 1933	Succeeded by Duca cabinet
