= First Mironescu cabinet =

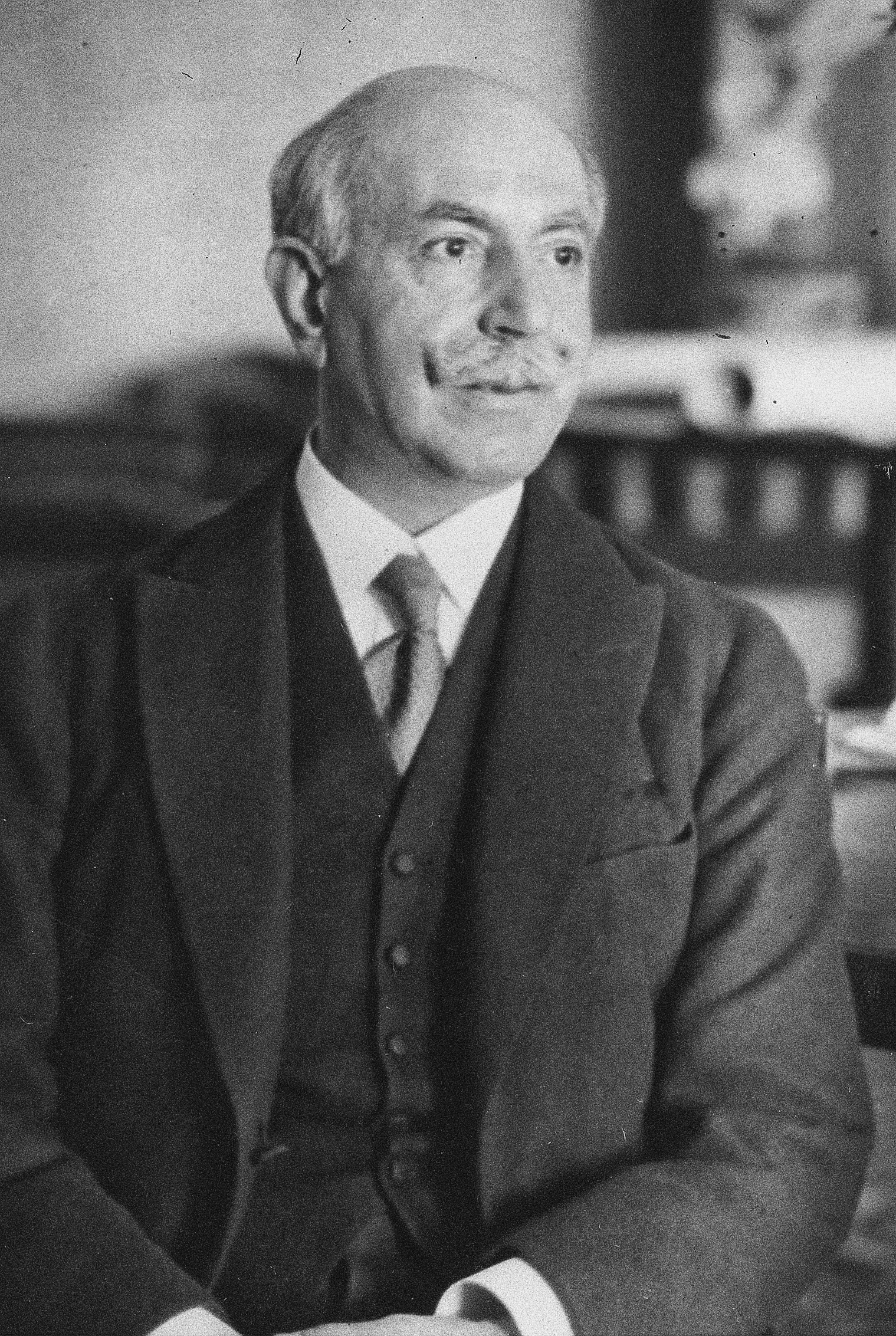
Gheorghe Mironescu

The first cabinet of Gheorghe Mironescu was the government of Romania from 7 June to 12 June 1930.

== Composition ==
The ministers of the cabinet were as follows:

- President of the Council of Ministers:

- Gheorghe Mironescu (7 - 12 June 1930)

- Minister of the Interior:

- Mihai Popovici (7 - 12 June 1930)

- Minister of Foreign Affairs:

- Gheorghe Mironescu (7 - 12 June 1930)

- Minister of Finance:

- Ion Răducanu (7 - 12 June 1930)

- Minister of Justice:

- Voicu Nițescu (7 - 12 June 1930)

- Minister of Public Instruction and Religious Affairs:

- Ion Lugoșianu (7 - 12 June 1930)

- Minister of the Army:

- Gen. Nicolae Condeescu (7 - 12 June 1930)

- Minister of Agriculture and Property:

- Ion Mihalache (7 - 12 June 1930)

- Minister of Industry and Commerce:

- Eduard Mirto (7 - 12 June 1930)

- Minister of Public Works and Communications:

- Pantelimon Halippa (7 - 12 June 1930)

- Minister of Labour, Health, and Social Security:

- D. R. Ioanițescu (7 - 12 June 1930)

Preceded by First Maniu cabinet	Cabinet of Romania; 7 June 1930 - 12 June 1930	Succeeded by Second Maniu cabinet
