= Second Vaida-Voevod cabinet =

Romanian government in 1932

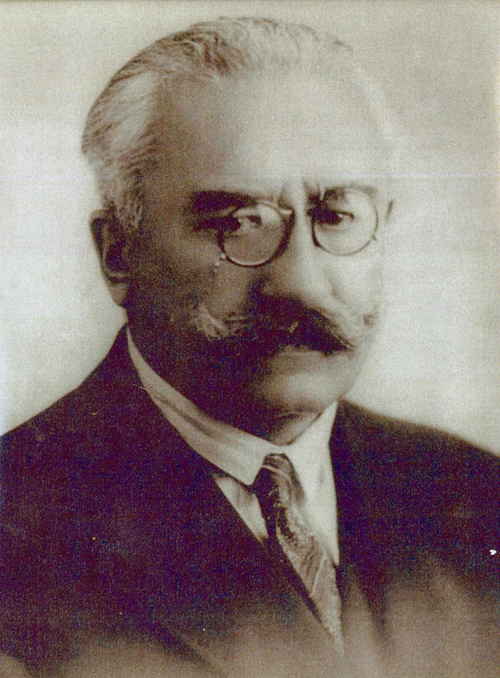
Alexandru Vaida-Voevod

The second cabinet of Alexandru Vaida-Voevod was the government of Romania from 6 June to 10 August 1932.

== Composition ==
The ministers of the cabinet were as follows:

- President of the Council of Ministers:

- Alexandru Vaida-Voevod (6 June - 10 August 1932)

- Minister of the Interior:

- Alexandru Vaida-Voevod (6 June - 10 August 1932)

- Minister of Foreign Affairs:

- (interim) Alexandru Vaida-Voevod (6 June - 10 August 1932)

- Minister of Finance:

- Gheorghe Mironescu (6 June - 10 August 1932)

- Minister of Justice:

- Virgil Potârcă (6 June - 10 August 1932)

- Minister of Public Instruction, Religious Affairs, and the Arts:

- (interim) Ion Lugoșianu (6 - 9 June 1932)
- Dimitrie Gusti (9 June - 10 August 1932)

- Minister of National Defence:

- Gen. Constantin Ștefănescu-Amza (6 June - 10 August 1932)

- Minister of Agriculture and Property:

- (interim) Virgil Potârcă (6 - 7 June 1932)
- Voicu Nițescu (7 June - 10 August 1932)

- Minister of Industry and Commerce:

- Ion Lugoșianu (6 June - 10 August 1932)

- Minister of Labour, Health, and Social Security:

- (interim) Alexandru Vaida-Voievod (7 - 9 June 1932)
- D. R. Ioanițescu (9 June - 10 August 1932)

- Minister of Public Works and Communications:

- (interim) Gheorghe Mironescu (6 - 7 June 1932)
- Ioan Gr. Periețeanu (7 June - 10 August 1932)

- Ministers of State:

- Emil Hațieganu (6 June - 10 August 1932)
- Pantelimon Halippa (6 June - 10 August 1932)

Preceded by Iorga cabinet	Cabinet of Romania; 6 June 1932 - 10 August 1932	Succeeded by Third Vaida-Voevod cabinet
