= Iorga cabinet =

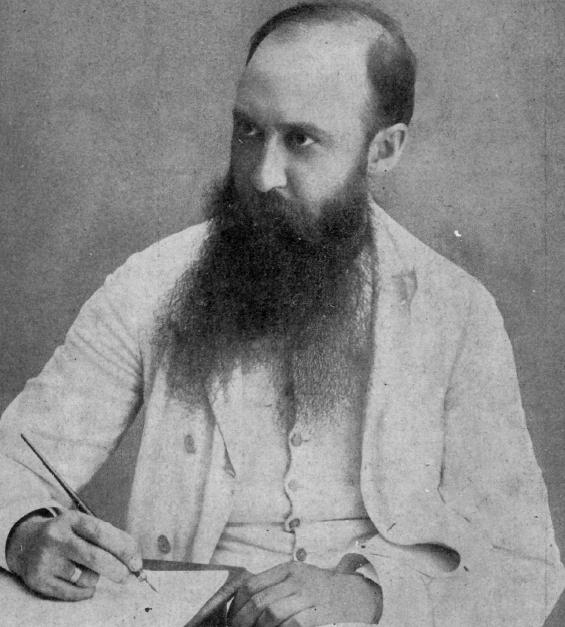
Nicolae Iorga in 1914

The cabinet of Nicolae Iorga was the government of Romania from 18 April 1931 to 5 June 1932.

== Composition ==
The ministers of the cabinet were as follows:

- President of the Council of Ministers:

- Nicolae Iorga (18 April 1931 – 5 June 1932)

- Minister of the Interior:

- (interim) Nicolae Iorga (18 April – 7 May 1931)
- (interim) Constantin Argetoianu (7 May 1931 – 5 June 1932)

- Minister of Foreign Affairs:

- (interim) Constantin Argetoianu (18 – 27 April 1931)
- Dimitrie I. Ghica (27 April 1931 – 5 June 1932)

- Minister of Finance:

- Constantin Argetoianu (18 April 1931 – 5 June 1932)

- Minister of Justice:

- Constantin Hamangiu (18 April 1931 – 7 January 1932)
- (interim) Victor Vâlcovici (7 – 9 January 1932)
- Valeriu Pop (9 January – 5 June 1932)

- Minister of Public Instruction, Religious Affairs, and the Arts:

- Nicolae Iorga (18 April 1931 – 5 June 1932)

- Minister of the Army:

- Gen. Constantin Ștefănescu-Amza (18 April 1931 – 5 June 1932)

- Minister of Agriculture and Property:

- Gheorghe Ionescu-Sisești (18 April 1931 – 5 June 1932)

- Minister of Industry and Commerce:

- Mihail Manoilescu (18 April – 14 June 1931)
- Nicolae Vasilescu-Karpen (14 June 1931 – 12 January 1932)
- Gheorghe Tașcă (12 January – 5 June 1932)

- Minister of Public Works and Communications:

- Victor Vâlcovici (18 April 1931 – 5 June 1932)

- Minister of Labour, Health, and Social Security:

- Ioan Cantacuzino (18 April 1931 – 5 June 1932)

- Ministers of State:

- Iuliu Hațieganu (29 April – 14 July 1931)
- Valeriu Pop (14 July 1931 – 9 January 1932)
- Vladimir Cristi (16 January – 5 June 1932)
- Gen. Ioan Rășcanu (22 June 1931 – 5 June 1932)

Preceded by Second Mironescu cabinet	Cabinet of Romania; 18 April 1931 – 5 June 1932	Succeeded by Second Vaida-Voevod cabinet
