= Mihail Manoilescu =

Romanian politician and economist (1891–1950)

74th Minister of Foreign Affairs of Romania
- In office 4 July 1940 – 14 September 1940
- Prime Minister: Ion Gigurtu
- Preceded by: Constantin Argetoianu
- Succeeded by: Mihail R. Sturdza

Personal details
- Born: December 9, 1891 Tecuci, Kingdom of Romania
- Died: December 30, 1950 (aged 59) Sighet Prison, Romanian People's Republic
- Party: National Liberal Party; People's Party; Iron Guard
- Education: School of Bridges and Roads
- Occupation: Engineer, economist, journalist
- Employer(s): National Bank of Romania; Politehnica University of Bucharest

Mihail Manoilescu (Romanian pronunciation: [mihaˈil mano.iˈlesku]; December 9, 1891 – December 30, 1950) was a Romanian journalist, engineer, economist, politician and memoirist, who served as Foreign Minister of Romania during the summer of 1940. An active promoter of and contributor to fascist ideology and antisemitic sentiment, he was a financial backer of the Iron Guard in the late 1930s. His corporatist ideas influenced economic policy in several countries during the 1930s, particularly in Brazil.

== Biography ==
=== Early life ===
Born to a political family in Tecuci, he was the nephew of Alexandru Bădărău, twice a minister in Conservative cabinets during the early 1900s, and a descendant of the Moldavian boyar known as Logofătul Tăutu; his grandfather was strong unionist, a supporter of the Union of Moldova with Wallachia, while his father was a member of the Socialist Party. The Manoilescus moved to Iași when Mihail was a child. Having been the recipient of the Gazeta Matematică prize in 1910, he went on to study at the "Școala de Poduri și Șosele" (the School of Bridges and Roads) in Bucharest, completing his training as a valedictorian in 1915. Manoilescu was subsequently assigned to the Ministry of Public Works, and later moved to an artillery regiment in Roman.

Upon Romania's entry into World War I, he was assigned to the Directorate of Ammunitions (led by Tancred Constantinescu), and designed an original type of 210 mm howitzer, which, after southern Romania was invaded by the Central Powers (see Romanian Campaign), was produced in Nicolina. After the conflict, in 1919, he had a minor role in the National Liberal Party (PNL) governments, assisting General Constantinescu as Head of the Industrial Recovery Directorate and later as General Director of Industry.

=== With Averescu ===
Soon, Manoilescu joined the People's Party, a populist force led by General Alexandru Averescu, becoming undersecretary of state in the latter's first cabinet. He was responsible for measures such as organizing the Industrial Exhibition, carrying out industrial statistics, and unifying legislation related to the industry. In 1921, he resigned his ministerial position, justifying it as an attempt to further his expertise and investigative range.

During the period when the PNL returned to government, Manoilescu focused on his research, and contributed 18 individual works. He also became influential as an orator, and was a frequent presence in conferences hosted by the sociologist Dimitrie Gusti. Manoilescu returned to high office with the second Averescu executive, and drafted innovative legislation concerning tariffs and salary amortization.

In 1926, while on a mission to Italy, where he was to negotiate a loan and pave the way for the friendship treaty signed between the two countries, he met the fascist dictator Benito Mussolini and became his admirer (calling the Fascist regime "a truly constructive political revolution, one that can only compare itself with the great French revolution in scale and novelty"). Subsequently, he was active in collaboration with the Comitati d'azione per l'universalità di Roma and other Italian-led projects of international cooperation.

=== 1927 trial ===
He was then an advocate of the crowning of Carol Caraiman as King of Romania (in the place of his underage son Mihai). In the autumn of 1927, while distributing Carol's appeals to the leaders of various political parties and carrying his letter to Queen Marie, he was arrested (martial law was proclaimed by the Ion I. C. Brătianu government in the incident's wake). Manoilescu, who benefited from Averescu's vocal support, was acquitted when tried by a court subordinated to the Council of War in late November.

His own testimony was indicated by Time as arguing that Carol was alarmed by an alleged growth in republicanism and only wished to be part of the Regency. He also stated:

"The Prince is too loyal and decent to think of dethroning his own son."

While accusing the executive of having previously attempted to purchase his silence, Manoilescu stressed his belief that King Ferdinand had, just before his death, asked Brătianu for Carol to be allowed to return. He also speculated that Ferdinand had endorsed a regency only for as long as Carol continued to behave irresponsibly, and had not wanted to exclude his son from the throne. Averescu, who unsuccessfully called on both Carol and Brătianu to take the stand, backed this version by mentioning his own experience as a mediator between Ferdinand and Carol, during which the latter had allegedly agreed to comply, while the former had eventually become more open to Carol's return.

The acquittal came as a shock, given rumors that Premier Brătianu had instructed the court to find Manoilescu guilty. In an unusual incident during the first day of trial, news correspondents from abroad were told that international phone connections had been severed—they resorted to crossing the Danube into Bulgaria at Giurgiu, using phones there to contact their employers, and repeated the trip several times over the following days.

=== Camarilla ===
After Carol returned to rule as Carol II in mid-1930, Manoilescu was a very influential person in the king's camarilla, being the Minister of Economy in the National Peasants' Party (PNȚ) cabinets of Iuliu Maniu and Gheorghe Mironescu (while he was a member of that party), as well as under Nicolae Iorga (1931-1932). He was elected to the Assembly of Deputies for the PNȚ in 1930, representing Caraș County. His political adversaries speculated that he had forged documents and played a hand in bringing Carol's mistress, Magda Lupescu, back into the country.

In his memoirs, Manoilescu claimed that, at the time, he had played a hand in the release of Mihai Gheorghiu Bujor (imprisoned since 1918, due to his Bolshevik activism and designs for a communist revolution); Manoilescu authored a series of articles in his support, and allegedly intervened alongside King Carol (it is generally accepted that the most decisive action in this respect was taken by Maniu, who spoke against imprisonment for political crimes such as Bujor's).

At the time, he became a staunch rival of his fellow PNȚ member Virgil Madgearu. According to Petre Pandrea's hostile account, Manoilescu purchased from the writers Sergiu Dan and Ion Vinea an allegedly stolen text which appeared to be entirely written by Madgearu, but had been heavily forged by the two to include criticism of the king; Manoilescu attempted to use the document against its supposed author, but was exposed by Carol himself (who, according to Pandrea, was amused by the events). The incident contributed to PNŢ inner-conflict that caused Manoilescu to leave the grouping.

In 1931, Manoilescu was governor of the National Bank of Romania and began teaching political economy at the Polytechnic Institute. As governor, he refused to salvage the Marmorosch Blank Bank with state funds, and clashed with Carol over the issue, being ultimately removed from office in November of the same year.

He began editing a magazine, Lumea Nouă, which was to become the main platform for his ideas, and, in 1932, created his own party—Liga Național-Corporatistă (National-Corporatist League). Between 1932 and 1937, he was assigned a seat in the Senate, representing the Romanian Chamber of Commerce.

=== Political and economic theories ===
In Paris in 1929, he published the first version of his fundamental work, The theory of protectionism and international exchanges at the Giard publishing house (as part of the "Bibliothèque Économique Internationale" collection). His intense advocacy of industrialization formed the main theme of the book The role and destiny of Romania's bourgeoisie (1942), which was one of the main works dealing with the development of a local middle class, alongside those written by Ştefan Zeletin and Eugen Lovinescu (while sharing some perspectives with the essays of Emil Cioran); the topic blended with his support for authoritarianism and the one-party system, as Manoilescu rejected democracy (which, in his view, encouraged the majority-forming peasantry to decide on matters that did not concern it). The role and destiny... criticized the course of Romanian social development:

"[...] an oversized bourgeoisie which mimicks the boyars of yesteryear and has an over-bourgeois way of living, oversized in comparison with its means, creates a certain social instability and features a high percentage of individual failures.
That is why the Romanian bourgeoisie is not in fact a bourgeoisie in one of its most essential features; whereas the Occident focuses on accumulation, security and the future, our bourgeoisie will focus on spending, satisfaction and the present. Whereas the Western bourgeois work for their children, the Romanian bourgeois will often only work for themselves."

Among others, Manoilescu adopted some of the Poporanist ideas on capital and its international circulation, as present in the works of Constantin Stere (in turn influenced by Werner Sombart). He argued that a national economy could develop only if it minimized its contacts with the world market and relied instead on cultivating internal demand for a local industry.

At the same time, his magazine supported a nationalist and racist approach, viewing corporatism as "the guarantee of Romanianization", and proclaiming that "the racial basis of Romania is the same as that of Aryan Europe". Manoilescu himself welcomed the antisemitic policies of the Alexandru Vaida-Voevod government.

Manoilescu's corporatist and protectionist ideas began to be applied in Brazil, as the basis of that country's industrial development during its Estado Novo regime. In that his writings elaborated that, since the engagement of productive forces in industry, as more productive than agriculture and other raw materials domestic industry needs to be encouraged by broad protective barriers as the basis of economic development constituted an influence on both Celso Furtado and Raúl Prebisch (arguably, it also indirectly influenced the United Nations Economic Commission for Latin America and the Caribbean). Manoilescu influenced not only business circles in Brazil, but his arguments were also referred to by the Lewiatan Group in Poland. Mihail Manoilescu, together with the French economist François Perroux, prepared the way for the reception of corporatism in Brazil during the 1930s. Establishing corporatism in Brazil was partly achieved by translating and publishing into Portuguese some of Manoilescu's works. During the Interwar, Manoilescu's economic and political essays were published in Spain, Portugal, Brazil and Chile. His works also had some influence in Argentina, although not as much as in Brazil and Chile. On the other hand, Manoilescu's advocacy of autarkic measures has been compared to the measures enforced by later Stalinist regimes, including that of Nicolae Ceaușescu in Romania, who on at least one occasion described his works as a major contribution to the theory of "underdevelopment".

=== Iron Guard ===
Despite the increasingly tense relations between Carol and the fascist Iron Guard, Manoilescu was viewed with interest by the latter. By the late 1930s, he was himself a supporter of the Guard (which he hoped to see turning into a corporatist movement—"an instrument to validate the goals of the [Guard's] national revolution"), and donated part of his land to one of the latter's enterprises. His new discourse was ridiculed by his former colleagues in the National Peasants' Party, as "desperate attempts to exit from the [old generation of politicians] and sit among the new men". In February 1937, he began discreetly financing the Guard's newly created paper, Buna Vestire (he was exposed as the man behind it by virtually all political commentators of the time).

In the election of 1937, he ran for the Senate on the Everything for the Fatherland Party list (which served as a front for the Iron Guard). According to his political adversary Constantin Argetoianu, the party's unofficial leader Corneliu Zelea Codreanu made similar proposals to philosopher Nae Ionescu and General Gheorghe Moruzi: Ionescu denied the request because, as a self-proclaimed pillar of the Guard, he could not accept such a lowly position, while Moruzi called Manoilescu "a con artist" and alluded to his reported connection with Magda Lupescu. Argetoianu sarcastically remarked, "the party of «moral regeneration» was left with one guest, with Manoilescu!" During the period, Manoilescu also applied changes to his earlier vision on industry and self-sufficiency, calling for Romania to develop itself by supplying raw materials to the rising force that was Nazi Germany.

=== Foreign minister ===
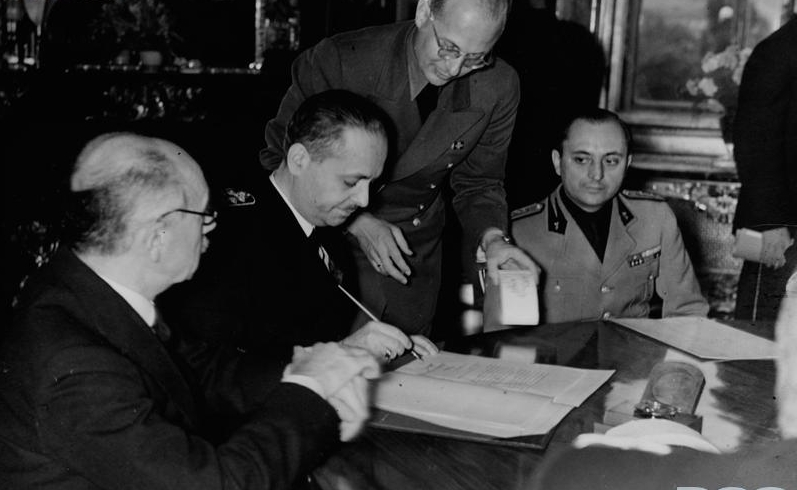
Hungarian Foreign Minister István Csáky signing the Second Vienna Award, with Manoilescu to the right, August 30, 1940

In July 1940, at the moment of crisis when Bessarabia and Northern Bukovina were ceded to the Soviet Union, Manoilescu was named foreign minister in the pro-fascist government headed by Ion Gigurtu. The new executive was faced with eventually successful attempts by Hungary, backed by Italy and Nazi Germany, to revise its border with Romania by the Treaty of Trianon, in reality a dictate. Manoilescu, who was a supporter of the Axis alliance, attempted in vain to make use of his influence with Italian authorities. In order to ensure less international adversity toward Romania, he also offered to cede Southern Dobruja to Bulgaria (although Germany had not included this revision in its demands toward the Romanian executive), an approach eventually leading to the Treaty of Craiova.

As foreign minister of Romania convoked by the Axis, on August 30, he signed the Second Vienna Award, which divided Transylvania between Hungary and Romania (see Northern Transylvania). While German Foreign Minister, Joachim von Ribbentrop, communicated the final decision, in the Gold Room of the Belvedere Palace, Manoilescu fainted, after seeing the map of the new borders, imposed by Germany and Italy, whilst the Hungarian side jubilated.

In September, he was involved in negotiations with Soviet envoys regarding a détente between the two countries; at the time, examining the situation created by warm relations between the Axis and the Soviet Union (see Molotov–Ribbentrop Pact), the fall of France and the United Kingdom's isolation (which had deprived Romania of diplomatic alternatives), Manoilescu argued that Romania looked "with respect" towards Moscow, Berlin, and Rome. Asked by the Soviet delegation to account for alleged new border incidents, he stiffly denied that these had ever occurred.

=== 1940s, imprisonment and death ===
The responsibility for the Transylvanian compromise weighed heavily on him later in the following year, when the Iron Guard, revived by the leadership of Horia Sima, came to government and proclaimed the National Legionary State; it refused to appoint Manoilescu to any leadership position. He did however continue to serve as Foreign Minister during the short-lived First Antonescu cabinet, bringing the overall duration of his 1940 term to 70 days (July 4 to September 14). After the Iron Guard's 1941 Rebellion, he remained present on the political stage as a supporter of Ion Antonescu's dictatorship (see Romania during World War II). In autumn 1940, he represented his country to Rome, where he attempted to persuade Italian officials to look into information about Hungarian violence in Northern Transylvania, and, in July 1942, traveled to the Independent State of Croatia to meet with Otto Franges, his collaborator on an overview of Southeast European economy.

On October 12, 1944, as Romania signed an armistice with the United Nations, Manoilescu was jailed without trial for 14 months, during which time he was expelled from his position at the Polytechnic Institute. Because of the bad sanitary conditions in prison, he became sick with endemic typhus, and sent to the hospital for contagious diseases in Colentina. Set free in December 1945, he resumed work on his unfinished writings, and became an advocate of harvesting geothermal power in Romania (his innovations in the field were patented on the name of his son, Alexandru Manoilescu). He was once again jailed by Communist Romanian authorities on December 19, 1948, and was brought first to Jilava Prison, and then to the prison of Ocnele Mari. While being held there, Manoilescu became, together with the philosopher Petre Țuțea, a members of an "underground academy" organized by inmates.

Manoilescu was ultimately brought to Sighet Prison, where he died at the end of 1950. Typhus had left him with heart problems, which were aggravated in detention; with no medical attention, this led to his death; his body was buried in a common grave. In 1951, although deceased, he was brought to trial by a civil court for his journalistic activities. On April 12, 1952, he was sentenced in absentia to 15 years in prison, 10 years deprivation of civil rights, and confiscation of all property, a measure which is thought to be unprecedented. His family was told of his death only in May 1958.

== Honors ==
In the world of economics, Manoilescu is primarily remembered for the "Manoilescu argument", which states that when the marginal productivity of labor in agriculture is lower than that in other sectors, surplus labor should be redirected to higher-productivity activities, such as manufacturing.

On 14 April 2016, the National Bank of Romania issued a set of commemorative coins in honor of three former bank governors. Manoilescu, who led the bank for several months in 1931, was among them. Manoilescu's inclusion drew strong protests from the U.S. Embassy in Romania and the Wiesel Institute, on the grounds of Manoilescu's advocacy of Fascist ideology and antisemitism before World War II. In spite of the criticism, the Bank did not withdraw the coin.

In the city of Ploiești, a high school bears his name, while in Tecuci a street is named after him.
