= Neculai Costăchescu =

Romanian chemist and politician

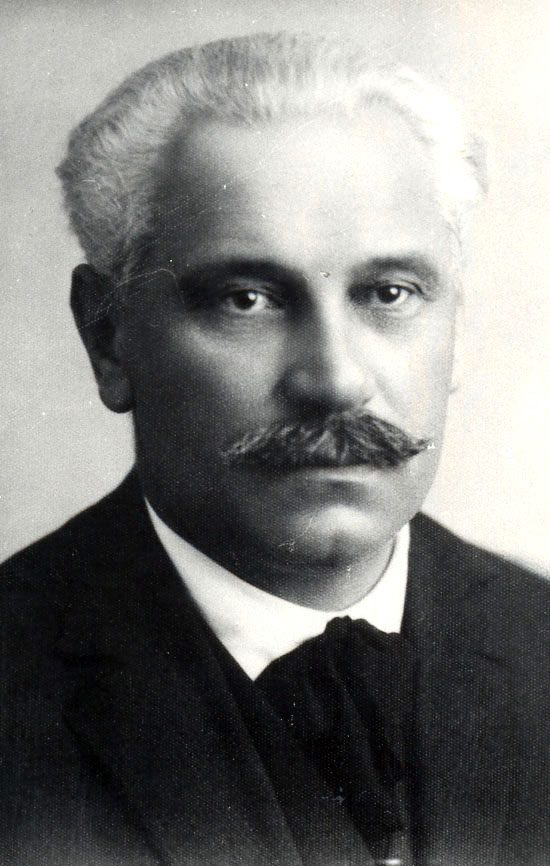

Neculai Costăchescu (18 February 1876–14 July 1939) was a Romanian chemist and politician.

Born in Huși, he obtained a degree in physics and chemistry from Iași University in 1901. Costăchescu earned a doctorate from the same institution in 1905, with a thesis on the gases found in Romania's salt deposits and muddy volcanoes; he was the university's first doctor in chemistry. He took specialty courses at the University of Zurich from 1906 to 1908, then was hired as professor of mineral chemistry at the Iași science faculty in 1912. There, he set up an organic chemistry laboratory. Thanks to his scientific activity, he was elected a corresponding member of the Romanian Academy in 1925, and was granted honorary membership in 1936.

Costăchescu entered politics in December 1918, at the close of World War I, and was a founding member of the Peasants' Party, serving as vice president until its 1926 merger with the Romanian National Party to form the National Peasants' Party (PNȚ). A prominent member of the latter, he was elected senator in 1926 and deputy in 1928. Between November 1928 and April 1931, he served as Public Instruction Minister in the PNȚ cabinets of Iuliu Maniu and Gheorghe Mironescu. He was Senate President from August 1932 to November 1933.

Costăchescu contributed to a number of specialized publications in Iași, such as Annales scientifiques de la Université de Jassy and Revista științifică V. Adamachi. His works included Fluosels de cobalt et de nikel (1911), Sels complexes de fer (1912) and Fluorures complexes de chrôme (1912–14).
