= Nicolae Condeescu =

Romanian general (1876–1936)

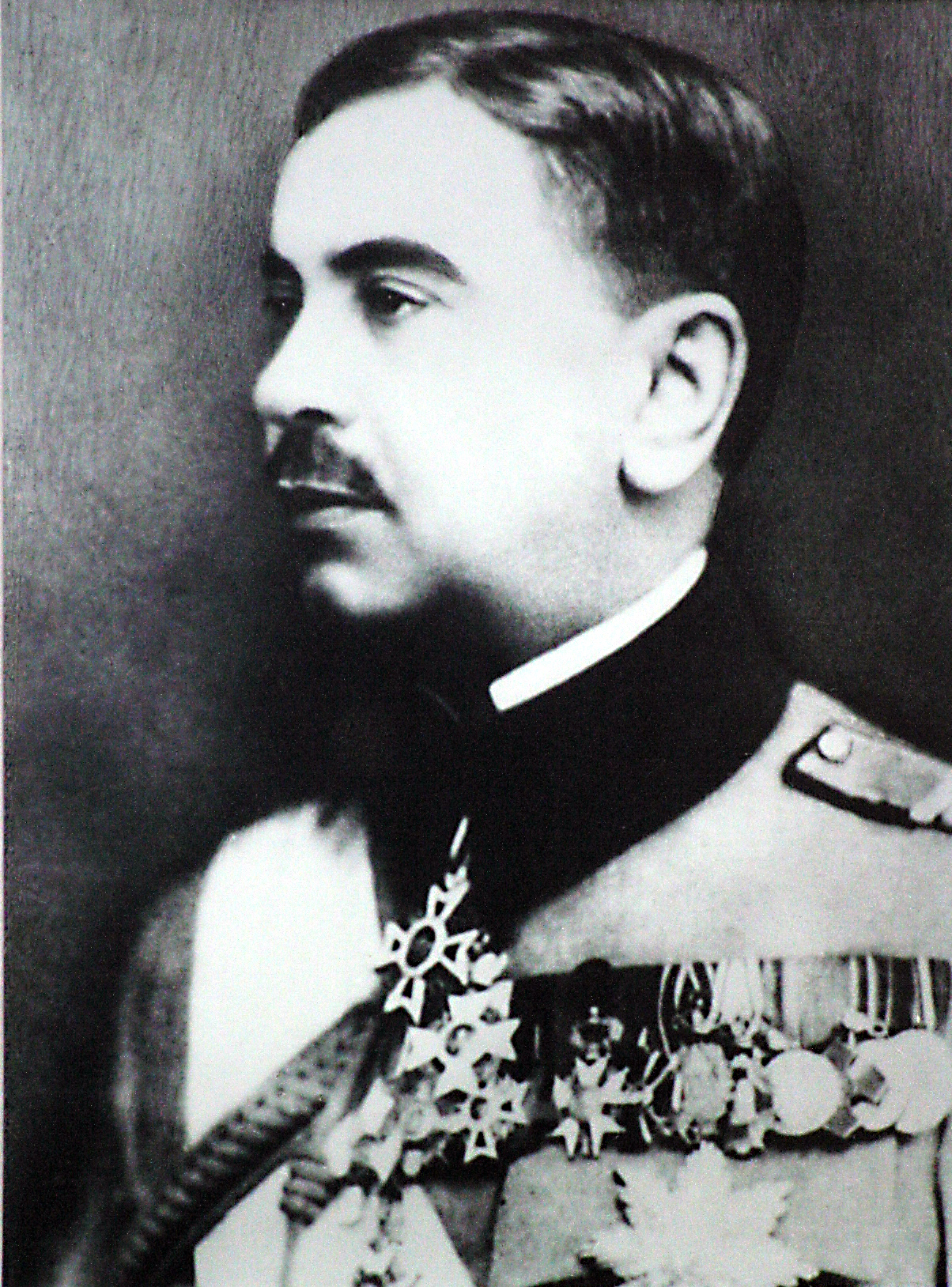
Nicolae Condeescu

Nicolae Condeescu (February 27, 1876–July 11, 1936) was a Romanian general.

Born in Coșereni, Ialomița County, his parents were Grigore and Maria. Condeescu attended the officers’ school in Bucharest from 1894 to 1896, following which he was enrolled in a regiment. He advanced to lieutenant in 1899 and attended the Higher War School from 1903 to 1905. Sent to work for the general staff in 1906, he became a captain the following year. For most of 1908, he was sent to train with an elite regiment of the Austro-Hungarian Army, following which he returned to the general staff.

In August 1916, when Romania entered World War I, Condeescu was made lieutenant-colonel. During much of the war, he did not command battle troops, instead working in military intelligence. He essentially built up this capacity of the Romanian Army from scratch, centralizing reports, studying the enemy armies, publishing orders and news bulletins, organizing espionage missions, identifying spies. The work eventually paid off with the victories at Mărăști and Mărășești, as the Romanian side was well informed about the position and plans of its adversaries. He also took measures to address the emerging threat of Soviet Russia.

Made a colonel in 1917, he was placed in command of an infantry regiment in June 1918. In November, as the war wound down, he was named adjutant to Crown Prince Carol, whose associate he would henceforth remain. Condeescu continued his intelligence work through 1919, when he left on a world tour with the prince. He was an active Freemason.

In 1926, Condeescu was made a brigadier general in charge of an infantry corps. In 1927, he returned to the general staff. Advanced to division general the following year, he also became head of the royal military guard. From April 1930 to April 1931, he served as Army Minister under Iuliu Maniu and Gheorghe Mironescu. He subsequently became inspector general of the territorial command. His awards included the Order of the Crown, knight (1913) and commander; the Order of Saint Anna and the Order of Saint Vladimir; and the Legion of Honour, officer.

Condeescu married Virginia Petrescu of Târgoviște in 1907; their son Dan was born in 1911. In the summer of 1936, months after turning 60, Condeescu died on his estate in Urlați.
