= Virgil Madgearu =

Romanian economist and politician

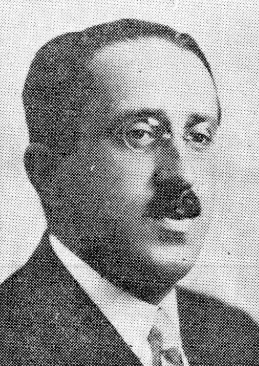
- Born: 14 December 1887; Galați, Kingdom of Romania
- Died: 27 November 1940 (aged 52); Snagov, Ilfov County, Kingdom of Romania
- Cause of death: Gunshot wounds
- Resting place: Bellu Cemetery
- Occupations: Academic, politician
- Spouse: Ecaterina Madgearu

Academic background
- Education: Leipzig University
- Thesis: Zur industriellen Entwicklung Rumäniens: die voratufen des Fabriksystems in der Walachei (1911)
- Doctoral advisor: Karl Bücher

Academic work
- Discipline: Economics
- Institutions: Bucharest Academy of Economic Studies
- Influenced

Minister of Industry and Commerce
- In office 10 November 1928 – 14 November 1929
- Prime Minister: Iuliu Maniu
- Preceded by: Ludovic Mrazek
- Succeeded by: Aurel Vlad
- In office 11 August 1932 – 19 October 1932
- Prime Minister: Alexandru Vaida-Voevod
- Preceded by: Ion Lugoșianu
- Succeeded by: Ion Lugoșianu

Minister of Finance
- In office 26 October 1929 – 6 June 1930
- Prime Minister: Iuliu Maniu
- Preceded by: Iuliu Maniu
- Succeeded by: Ion Răducanu
- In office 20 October 1932 – 13 November 1933
- Prime Minister: Iuliu Maniu; Alexandru Vaida-Voevod
- Preceded by: Gheorghe Mironescu
- Succeeded by: Dinu Brătianu

Minister of Agriculture and Property
- In office 10 October 1930 – 17 April 1931
- Prime Minister: Gheorghe Mironescu
- Preceded by: Ion Mihalache
- Succeeded by: Gheorghe Ionescu-Sisești

Personal details
- Party: Peasants' Party; National Peasants' Party

Virgil Traian N. Madgearu (Romanian pronunciation: [virˈd͡ʒil maˈd͡ʒe̯aru]; December 14, 1887 – November 27, 1940) was a Romanian economist, sociologist, and left-wing politician, prominent member and main theorist of the Peasants' Party and of its successor, the National Peasants' Party (PNȚ). He had an important activity as an essayist and journalist, being for long a member on the editorial board for the influential Viața Românească.

Madgearu was a prominent opponent of the National Liberal Party for much of his life, developing an original theory that challenged both Liberal tenets and Marxian economics, proposing measures to enhance the political and economic roles of Romanian peasants. In his later years, he was involved in anti-fascist causes, and was one of several politicians to be assassinated by the Iron Guard.

== Biography ==
Born in Galați to an Armenian-Romanian family, he attended the city's Vasile Alecsandri High School, graduating in 1907. He then studied economics at Leipzig University, where he was influenced by Karl Lamprecht, Wilhelm Wundt, and Karl Bücher. After graduating in December 1910, he spent a year in London, where he attended university courses for two semesters and trained at a bank. In 1911, he was awarded a doctorate in Leipzig; his thesis, written under the direction of Bücher, was titled Zur industriellen Entwicklung Rumäniens: die voratufen des Fabriksystems in der Walachei ("On the industrial development of Romania: the forerunners of the factory system in Wallachia").

After being employed by an insurance company, Madgearu was named in 1916 professor at the Academy for High Commercial and Industrial Studies in Bucharest, and held the position until his death. With Dimitrie Gusti, he founded the Romanian Social Institute, which aided sociologists in first-hand investigation work.

As one of the leaders in the parliamentary opposition to the Alexandru Averescu government, he was at the center of a scandal in July 1921: during a prolonged debate, he was addressed an insult by the People's Party politician Constantin Argetoianu; promptly, the National Liberal Party (PNL) leader Ion G. Duca expressed his sympathy, and helped weaken political support for Averescu (the cabinet was to fall in autumn of that year). Nevertheless, Madgearu's rejection of PNL policies and the Ion I. C. Brătianu government led him to join, in 1923, Liga Drepturilor Omului (the League for Human Rights), reuniting a diverse group of leftist activists such as Constantin Rădulescu-Motru, Constantin Mille, Nicolae L. Lupu, Constantin Costa-Foru, Constantin Titel Petrescu, Dem I. Dobrescu, Victor Eftimiu, Radu D. Rosetti, and Grigore Iunian; it was active until 1928.

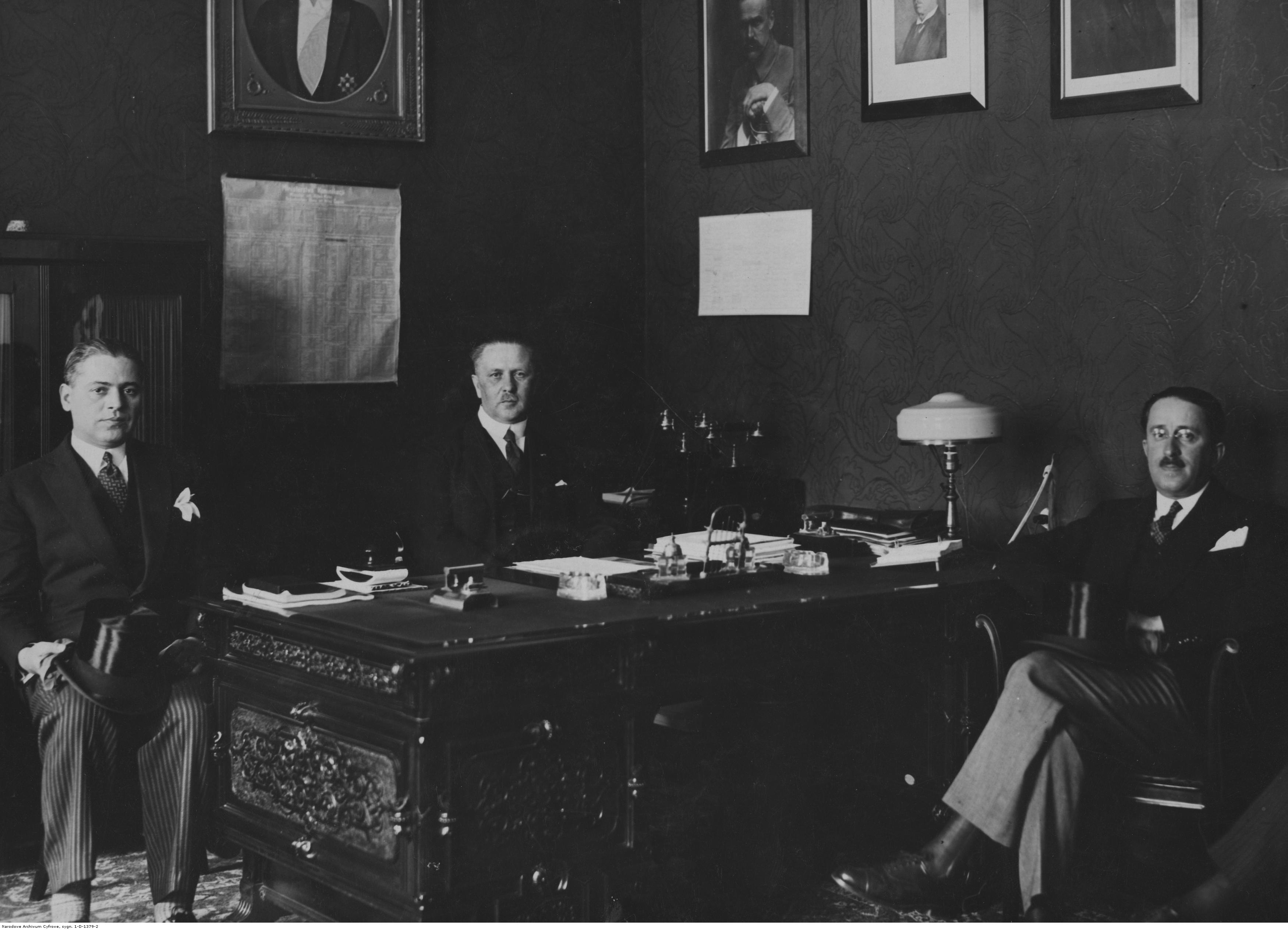
Official visit of Virgil Madgearu in Warsaw, Poland (August 1929). Virgil Madgearu (right), Cesar Popescu (left), Witold Czapski (middle).

He held several governmental positions in the Iuliu Maniu, Gheorghe Mironescu, and Alexandru Vaida-Voevod PNȚ cabinets: he was Minister for Industry and Trade (1928–1929; June–October 1930; August–October 1932), Finance Minister (1929–1930; 1932–1933), and Minister for Agriculture and Royal Domains in 1931. He also represented Romania at the League of Nations conferences on economy (in the context of the Great Depression), and was secretary of the PNȚ in 1926, as well as its leader for Ilfov County.

Madgearu was initially supportive of King Carol II, whom his party had helped bring to power, and remained sympathetic despite the confrontation between the monarch and the PNȚ leader Maniu. According to the ironic account given by Petre Pandrea, the connection was tested by intrigue, after the writers Sergiu Dan and Ion Vinea allegedly stole a text by Madgearu (which was supposed to be published in Dreptatea), forged it by adding statements critical of Carol's policies, and sold it to Madgearu's main adversary inside the party, Mihail Manoilescu (Carol himself dismissed the letter as a fake, contributing to the ultimate PNȚ inner-conflict that caused Manoilescu to leave the group).

After Carol established his personal dictatorship, he continued to side with the PNȚ, which was active in semi-clandestinity. According to the PNȚ activist Ioan Hudiță, Madgearu, with Ion Mihalache and Mihai Popovici, continued to support the king, and, after 1938, considered joining the National Renaissance Front.

== Death ==
An adversary of the fascist Iron Guard, he staunchly opposed its rise and the National Legionary State established in September 1940. Later in that year, after the remains of Corneliu Zelea Codreanu were discovered at Jilava Prison (and the conclusion was drawn that he had been murdered on the orders of King Carol), Madgearu and Nicolae Iorga were among the victims of a wave of assassinations carried out in reprisal. Hours after the Jilava Massacre, Madgearu was attacked in his Bucharest house, kidnapped, and taken to the Snagov forest, where he was shot by five members of the Iron Guard, who discharged their pistols in bursts into his back.

== Aftermath ==
During the following decades, his killing remained a debated topic. It became apparent that Horia Sima (Codreanu's successor) was not able to justify it using the predilect excuse, as a direct answer to previous repressive measures. Unlike Iorga, who had assisted in Codreanu's arrest, Madgearu had not been responsible for any violent actions, and was probably targeted only for having served under Carol. Sima later argued that the series of murders had no relevant impact on public opinion (and even that it had led to an increase in his party's appeal). However, condemnation of the actions was widespread, and the resulting negative image probably contributed in rallying political forces behind traditional authorities, and the eventual ousting of the Guard by the Ion Antonescu-led Romanian Army (January 1941; see also Romania during World War II). The prosecutors of the Ilfov Court established that the same death squad that killed Madgearu also assassinated Iorga in Strejnic; the perpetrators were identified as Traian Boeru, Ion Tucan, Ștefan I. Cojocaru, Tudor Duca, and Ștefan Iacobută. The death squad leader, Boeru, would later be recruited by the foreign intelligence arm of the Securitate, with the mission of spying on the legionary groups that had taken refuge in the West. Madgearu's widow, Ecaterina, would be arrested in 1952 for having belonged to the PNȚ; sentenced to 5 years of detention, she was sent to Dumbrăveni Prison, and was liberated in 1954.

Madgearu's leftist views were treasured in retrospect by Nicolae Ceaușescu's communist regime, with its ethnocentric focus on regaining "progressive" precedents that were not actually communist (alongside Madgearu, several other Liga Drepturilor Omului members, and Iorga, the list also included Nicolae Titulescu, Traian Bratu, Grigore Filipescu, and Mitiță Constantinescu).

Posthumously, in 1990, the Romanian Academy elected him a member. High schools in Bucharest, Ploiești, Roșiorii de Vede, and Târgu Jiu are named after him. Streets in Bucharest, Mediaș, and Timișoara also bear his name.

== Theory ==
=== Romanian specificity ===
Inspired by Constantin Stere and Poporanism, Madgearu developed a theory arguing for the preservation of a "peasant economy" and the creation of a "peasant state", prioritizing the preservation of specificity and small rural holdings over large-scale industrialization (the ideal was partly mirrored by the cultural models of Constantin Rădulescu-Motru). Borrowing from the traditional criticism of modernization policies as applied in Romania (Junimea's early rejection of "forms without substance" — as skepticism toward direct borrowings of Western cultural, political, and economic models — as well as Constantin Dobrogeanu-Gherea's socialist perspective on the consequences the process had in the rural sphere — a capitalist "neo-serfdom"). Building on the ideas of Alexander Chayanov, he argued that Eastern Europe in its entirety had evaded Western developments, and was home to distinct economic and social patterns.

In 1919, upon the creation of the Peasants' Party, Madgearu wrote:

"If the methods of various socialist parties differ, if the majority of the socialist world does not believe in the means of Russian Marxism, their common goal is the very same.

If, in a state where the majority of the population is comprised of industrial proletarians, the tendency of socialism to conquer political power may be viewed as a natural and justified development, in a state where the proletariat is a minority such efforts cannot ever correspond with the natural evolution of things.

Nevertheless, the Russian example shows that the possibility for a dictatorship of the proletariat, even in a country where [the proletariat] is manifestly numerically inferior, is not excluded if the largest segment of the population is amorphous and politically inert as was the case of the peasantry in the Muscovite Empire [sic].

Within its new borders [that is, those of Greater Romania], Romania endures as an agrarian-industrial state, in which the rural inhabitants shall form more than three quarters of the population. Thus, what then ought to be more natural and necessary today, after the Russian lesson, than the political rallying of the peasantry, [than] its transformation from an amorphous and politically inert mass into a self-aware organism that is to demand its share of stately power in proportion to its numbers and significance?"

He believed that the development of the country was not to follow strict capitalist guidelines, and foreign capital was needed without neglecting the domestic one. Given that the export capacity of the country was very limited, he insisted on developing the domestic market. As the a labor force with medium qualification was missing in Romania, Madgearu called for the development of a proper training system which was to provide skilled professionals for the industry.

In this context, he, as much as the Peasants' Party leader Ion Mihalache, supported cooperative farming (with it, he primordially aimed to preserve the small-scale rural holding, which he saw as a viable economic cell for a relative future). Nevertheless, during the Great Depression, he revised some of his principles, and, like much of his party, advocated a focus on accelerated industrialization — as a means to preserve Romania's independence.

=== "Community of producers" ===
Madgearu defined his views on the industrial-agricultural relation in 1922, responding to mounting suspicions that his political faction was social class-based (and thus potentially revolutionary):

"If the peasant doctrine admits that the basis of its policies is class-focused, its concept of human society is not class-based and its ideas are less class-based than those of any other party. The other parties label themselves "socially harmonious", taking pride in themselves as national, fusing in their concerns the interests of all citizens. The peasant doctrine knows that they are, in reality, class-based parties, and, if it opposes them, it is precisely because of a national necessity, in order to ensure the normal social development of the people.

[...] The future society can only be a community of producers of manual and intellectual services, in which the labour of the one satisfying a human need, from bread production to poetry, shall be the only warrant for existence.

The economic and political doctrine of "socially harmonious" parties is domination of capital over labour. On the contrary, the peasant doctrine sees labour as dominating capital. The peasant should achieve a self-sufficient economic existence, and the industrial labourer should become an active collaborator in production, in cooperation with the intellectual labourer and the representatives of organized consumers."

His view on the role of peasant doctrine remained present in the National Peasants' Party program, as illustrated in Iuliu Maniu's 1926 speech on the group's ideology:

"If the National Peasants' Party on one hand relies on all the working and producing classes and aims to justly defend all these classes' economic and social interests, then, on the other, it cannot fail to note that the immense majority of the nation is formed by the peasant category."

=== Madgearu and Romanian Liberalism ===
Madgearu further contrasted his party's views with established politics, criticizing the policies of the National Liberals, who had ruled over Romania in previous decades:

"[...] in political rallying, peasant doctrine does not approve of the financial oligarchy's political domination, and strives to promote a truly democratic government, based on the freely-expressed will of popular masses, whose political awareness it seeks to awaken."

He expanded on this particular ideal in a 1924 article for Aurora:

"[If the Peasants' Party is to be victorious in elections] the shape of things would be changed. The National Bank would no longer be the economic fortress of the Liberal oligarchy. Trusts would no longer enslave and exploit the state. Their selfish and venal leaders would no longer be enthroned in overseeing positions over the country's destinies. Civil liberties nowadays suffocated and stolen civil rights would be fully restored, and the constitutional-parliamentary regime would become a reality, benefiting the development of popular masses as well as civilization."

Madgearu notably defended the vision of Constantin Dobrogeanu-Gherea in front of criticism from the maverick Liberal Ştefan Zeletin, who had written a comprehensive study of the Romanian bourgeoisie, overtly sympathetic towards economic liberalism.

=== Industrial evolution and state intervention ===
Carrying out a polemic with Marxism (while drawing inspiration from Rudolf Hilferding's Austromarxist views on economic history), Madgearu expanded on his belief that the new doctrine was universally acceptable and organic in the development of countries such as Romania:

"It could be objected, however, that peasant doctrine is hostile toward industry. It has been indicated that there is no disagreement between the development of an autonomous class of peasants and major industries, and that, quite the contrary, a mutual fulfillment was discovered between the development of peasant agriculture and major industrial enterprises...

In this sense, there is no question of agricultural policies versus industrial policies, of permanent and determined disagreement. Not even the doctrine of Poporanism denied the necessity of industrialization, but rather only the possibility of establishing a capitalist industry in underdeveloped agrarian environments. It is probable that the process of transformation of past agrarian states into industrial ones, on the basis of private property and free competition, will not be identically reproduced in present-day agrarian states. Even the social-democrat Kautsky stated that, in social transformation, there is no way of conceiving that an agricultural country should cover the same length and direction of the path taken by present-day industrial states."

In order to advance his proposed economic goals, Madgearu did however support a degree of state planning over the mixture of interventionism and laissez-faire advocated by the National Liberals:

"Without treasuring beyond measure the absolute value of planning in organizing the national economy, experience has shown the superiority of plan-based state intervention over that left to chance [...].

The multiple and varied interventions of the state in agriculture and industry, lacking any directive and continuity, are responsible for [the weakening of national economy].

[...] An economic plan does not at all imply the suppression or even a narrowing of private initiative in the economic life. An economic plan means containing and applying discipline to individual economic forces while maintaining the role of private initiative. An economic plan means coordinating the efforts of individual economic organizations and empowering them, through association and the systematic contribution of the state as the true representative of the national community."

== Selected works ==
- Zur industriellen Entwicklung Rumäniens ("On the economic evolution of Romania", 1911)
- Țărănismul ("Peasantism", 1921)
- Doctrina țărănistă ("Peasant doctrine", 1923)
- Dictatură economică sau democrație economică? ("Economic dictatorship or economic democracy?", 1925)
- Romania's new economic policy (in English in its original version, 1930)
- Notre collaboration technique avec la Société des Nations ("Our technical collaboration with the League of Nations", 1933)
- Agrarianism, capitalism, imperialism (1936)
- La politique extérieure de la Roumanie 1927-1938 ("Romania's external policies 1927-1938", 1939)
- Evoluția economiei românești după primul război mondial ("The development of Romanian economy after World War I", 1940)
