= Ion Mihalache =

Romanian politician

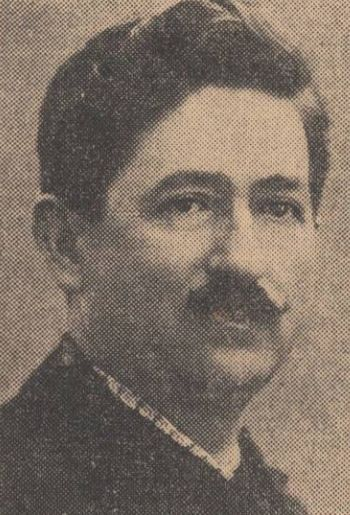

Member of the Crown Council
- In office 17 April 1940 – 26 June 1940
- Monarch: Carol II

Minister of Foreign Affairs
- In office 10 October 1930 – 17 April 1931
- Prime Minister: Iuliu Maniu; Gheorghe Mironescu
- Preceded by: Gheorghe Mironescu
- Succeeded by: Constantin Argetoianu

Minister of Internal Affairs
- In office 10 October 1930 – 4 April 1931
- Prime Minister: Iuliu Maniu; Gheorghe Mironescu
- Preceded by: Alexandru Vaida-Voievod
- Succeeded by: Nicolae Iorga
- In office 11 August 1932 – 8 January 1933
- Prime Minister: Alexandru Vaida-Voievod; Iuliu Maniu
- Preceded by: Alexandru Vaida-Voievod
- Succeeded by: George G. Mironescu

President of the National Peasants' Party
- In office June 1931 – July 1932
- Preceded by: Iuliu Maniu
- Succeeded by: Iuliu Maniu
- In office April 1935 – December 1937
- Preceded by: Alexandru Vaida-Voevod
- Succeeded by: Iuliu Maniu

Founding Leader of the Peasants' Party
- In office 18 December 1918 – 10 October 1926
- Succeeded by: Iuliu Maniu (party merged into the National Peasants' Party)

Personal details
- Born: 3 March [O.S. 19 February] 1882 Topoloveni, Muscel County, Kingdom of Romania
- Died: 5 February 1963 (aged 80) Râmnicu Sărat Prison, Romanian People's Republic
- Party: Peasants' Party; National Peasants' Party.

Ion Mihalache (Romanian pronunciation: [iˈon mihaˈlake]; 3 March [O.S. 19 February] 1882 – 5 February 1963) was a Romanian agrarian politician, the founder and leader of the Peasants' Party (PȚ) and a main figure of its successor, the National Peasants' Party (PNȚ).

== Early life ==
A schoolteacher born into a peasant family of Topoloveni, Muscel County, he served as a lieutenant in the Romanian Army during World War I. Mihalache, who soon became popular among Orthodox priests and village teachers, served as president of the local teachers' association.

He founded the PȚ in the Romanian Old Kingdom in 1918; under his leadership, it emerged from northern Muntenia and became a grouping with national appeal. The PȚ had much success in the elections of November 1919, forming a coalition government with the Transylvanian Romanian National Party (PNR), under Alexandru Vaida-Voevod. As a politician, Mihalache made himself known for supporting a political option that mixed traditionalist reserve towards industrialization and calls for preserving the rural base of Romanian economy through voluntary cooperative farming (allowing for a peasant-based industry) with a vision of left-wing Corporatism. In 1929, he wrote:

"Many have thought that [economic success] was only possible for the large-scale agricultural entrepreneur. And this is why they have supported that only on the basis of large-scale property can there be carried out a wise and lucrative agriculture, and that dividing the land leads to a decrease in production.
Perhaps it would be this way, if the small-scale agricultural entrepreneur will not 'organize' himself and will not enlighten himself.
But the cure was found: the association of peasants into agricultural cooperatives, which bring: money, as well as utensils, as well as regulated sales, as well as industrialization."

He notably took the initiative in calling for peaceful marches of peasants and members of the rural intelligentsia, and would almost always dress in accordance with the peasant tradition of his native Muscel County.

== 1919–1920 ==
Mihalache became Vaida-Voevod's Minister of Agriculture on December 16, 1919, in a cabinet replacing that of General Artur Văitoianu. Despite having led a populist movement, the People's Party, Averescu continuously opposed Mihalache's push for widespread land reform.

The new minister found himself at odds with the political establishment over the issue of land redistribution: promised by Ion I. C. Brătianu's National Liberal (PNL) government during World War I, and partly carried out in December 1918, the move viewed as incomplete - expropriations had not led to a redefinition of peasant property, and land had remained with provisional cooperatives instead of being allocated to members. Mihalache supported the fragmentation of all land property in a country of medium to small sized landowners. The Peasants' Party calculated leaving no landowner with more than on one square kilometre, which also included expropriating land for common pasture. At the same time, Vaida-Voevod's government created a conflict over its projects for constitutional reform, clashing with the PNL over the highly centralized government and support for the 1866 Constitution of Romania advocated by the latter. Mihalache is also known to have traveled incognito to various locations, as a means to observe first-hand abuse by government officials.

After a deadlock over these issues in Parliament, Averescu's group and the National Liberals began negotiation a new parliamentary majority; advised by Nicolae Iorga, who was president of the Chamber, Mihalache handed in his resignation (March 12, 1920), with the expectation that the land reform project was to be endorsed by parliamentary initiative. It was advanced later in the same day by the PȚ's Grigore Iunian. King Ferdinand I intervened in favor of the National Liberals, installing Averescu, who had reached an agreement with Brătianu, as Prime Minister.

A major factor in this move was pressure from the landowners to remove a threat to the system (notably, Constantin Garoflid filed a complaint with the king, while Mihalache caused scandal when he publicly assured peasants that the monarch's opposition was ultimately irrelevant. At the same time, the PȚ's politics had given way to fears that it was a Romanian equivalent of Aleksandar Stamboliyski's Agrarian Union of Bulgaria, or even a parallel to Bolshevism. To the latter accusation, Mihalache once replied indicating, as other leaders of his party had done, his belief that the peasant's needs identified with the national interest:

"Thus — after so many years of 'harmony', we arrive today as the 'agitators of social order' and clearly state:
Enough with the lie about social harmony. There is a conflict between social classes. We do not deny it, but rather bring it to light. We wish to take part in the fight in the name of an underprivileged working class, the peasantry. We wish to rally it in a class party. We shall not ask anybody for power, we shall fight to have the fair number of representatives of the peasant class in Parliament. May each class fight for this [that is, for their respective seats] and parliament will give itself the government it sees fit.
As for "social harmony" — as this has been up to now — we demand a particular balance between producing classes and wish for the abolition of parasite classes such as that of untrained politicians.
[...]'Bolshevism', cry the parasite politicians, accustomed to govern together with the highest power and their cries also alert the gentle folk, whose political judgment is chained in 'harmony'-related prejudice.
— 'Truth is not anarchy' — we reply."

The land reform that was ultimately carried out did however reflect the influence of some ideas supported by Mihalache, and was itself favorable to small holdings.

== PȚ-PNR union ==
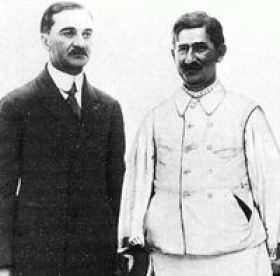
Iuliu Maniu and Mihalache

Mihalache became vice-president of the National Peasants' Party (PNȚ) in 1926, when the PNR and PȚ groups decided to unite in order to combat the effective monopoly the PNL had ensured after the voting of the 1923 Constitution. The new political group moderated many of its demands, and was not as adverse to industrialization as it had previously been. However, in 1928, Mihalache's voiced the party's call for a march on Bucharest, meant to topple Vintilă Brătianu's PNL cabinet: in May, large crowds gathered in Alba Iulia — despite the initial success in rallying all forces opposed to the National Liberals, the PNȚ did not capitalize on the gains, and continued instead to block activity in parliament.

He served as Minister of Agriculture in the Iuliu Maniu's government of 1928–1930 (being seconded by Armand Călinescu), then, between 1930 and 1933, he was the Minister of Internal Affairs (he also held the office of Foreign Minister between late 1930 and early 1931). In this latter capacity, Mihalache outlawed the fascist Iron Guard in January 1931 (under the premiership of Gheorghe Mironescu), following a period of violence and agitation by the movement. The measure was to prove inefficient in time, as the new cabinet allowed Corneliu Zelea Codreanu, leader of the Guard, to run in the 1931 elections on a new platform (the Corneliu Codreanu Grouping).

During the period, he also became a noted opponent of Carol II: as heir apparent, the latter had been denied the right of ascension after the war, and returned to the throne with Maniu's backing in 1930. The relations between the PNȚ and the monarch soured, however, especially after Vaida-Voevod's second cabinet fell in 1932, due to disagreement over several policies — as Minister of the Interior, Mihalache was directly involved in the dispute, as the scandal erupted when Gavrilă Marinescu, the prefect of police in Bucharest, refused to hand in his resignation, and instead called for the king's verdict. In 1935, Mihalache briefly took charge of the party upon Maniu's resignation, and steered it to the Left, charging Mihai Ralea and the PNȚ's Study Circle (Constantin Rădulescu-Motru, Mihail Ghelmegeanu, Ernest Ene, and Petre Andrei) with drafting a new party program that adapted Poporanist ideals.

After 1938, when, faced with the rise of the Iron Guard, Carol imposed his authoritarian regime, the PNȚ party refused collaboration and merger into the National Renaissance Front. According to the leading party member Ioan Hudiță, Mihalache, together with Virgil Madgearu and Mihai Popovici, continued to display support for the king and even considered joining the Front.

== World War II and after ==
During World War II, he opposed the National Legionary State created by the Iron Guard, and complained to the Guard's rival partner, Conducător Ion Antonescu, that Horia Sima and his grouping had assumed control of his cooperative organization in Muscel County. Antonescu refused to mediate; Sima replied to Mihalache that the measure had been partly taken as compensation for the Legionaries' "suffering at the hands of Mihalache [in 1930-1931]", but offered to allow some of the Muscel cooperative's former administrators structure to regain their positions. Attacks and threats towards Mihalache in the Guard's press became widespread, and Mille Lefter singled him out as a former persecutor of the movement in a conference aired on Romanian Radio.

Following Antonescu's defeat of the Guard during the Legionary Rebellion of 1941, Mihalache forwarded a congratulatory message to the former. In time, he also objected to Antonescu's Nazi Germany-allied dictatorship (although pressured by the latter to join a War Cabinet). He did, however, support the recovery of Bessarabia from the Soviet Union during Operation Barbarossa, and offered his services as a volunteer in the Romanian Army (June 1941) — he served for only a few days, and was discharged on orders from Antonescu himself.

He eventually joined a semi-clandestine opposition, and then supported the PNȚ's entry into the underground liberation movement, as well as King Michael's pro-Allied August 1944 coup.

The appearance of the Iron Curtain and Joseph Stalin's plans for Romania singled out the PNȚ, the main supporter of cooperation with the Western Allies, as an adversary of growing Soviet influence over the country (see Soviet occupation of Romania). Consequently, he and Maniu were branded "fascists" by the Romanian Communist Party press, and Mihalache was especially attacked for his supposedly good relations with Antonescu; the 1941 episode was used against him during the rigged 1946 elections, when Communists prevented him from running for office based on a law forbidding candidatures of former Eastern Front volunteers. It is possible, however, that just before the elections, the PNȚ had attempted to resist and profit from a foreseen insurrection against the Petru Groza government, by forming Cercul Militar Professional (the "Professional Military Circle") — grouping generals and other officers, it was led by Mihalache himself.

The Communist regime which was installed in late 1947 outlawed the PNȚ altogether, alleging that Mihalache and Maniu had been trying to flee the country from the airfield in Tămădău, and had planned to give Romania a capitalist government-in-exile. Their capture on July 14, 1947 (see Tămădău Affair) and trial by a kangaroo court led to sentencing on November 11 to life imprisonment with requirements of penal labour. Mihalache, after having been detained in a prison in Galați, was transferred to Sighet Prison on 15 August 1951. In 1955 he was moved to Râmnicu Sărat Prison, where he died in custody on February 5, 1963, the cause of death being attributed in the official report to cerebral edema.
