= Alexandru Vaida-Voevod =

Austro-Hungarian-born Romanian politician (1872–1950)

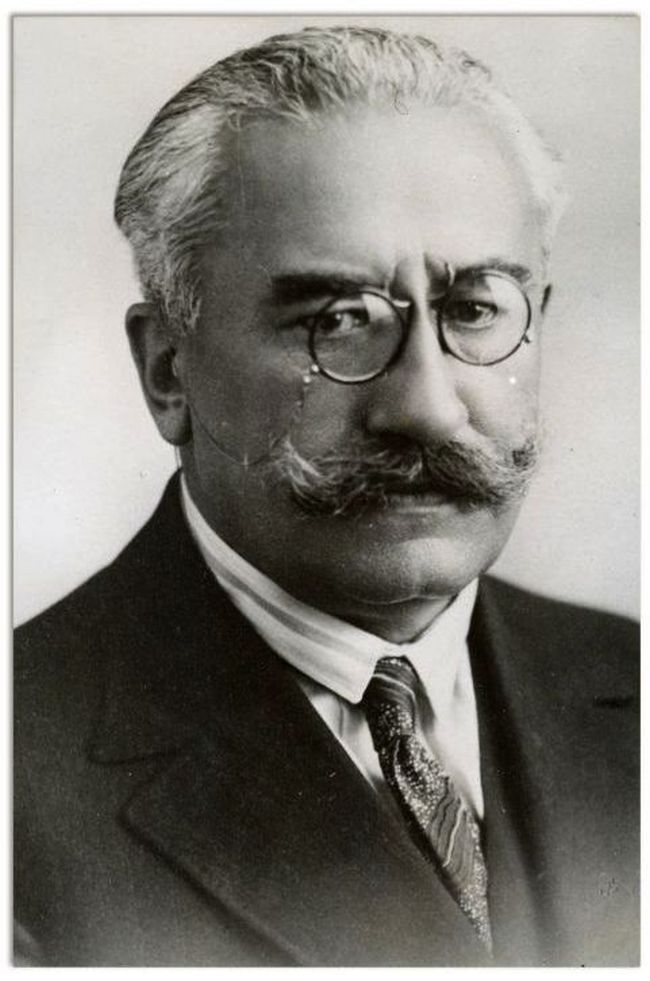

28th Prime Minister of Romania
- In office 1 December 1919 – 12 March 1920
- Monarch: Ferdinand I
- Preceded by: Artur Văitoianu
- Succeeded by: Alexandru Averescu
- In office 6 June 1932 – 19 October 1932
- Monarch: Carol II
- Preceded by: Nicolae Iorga
- Succeeded by: Iuliu Maniu
- In office 14 January 1933 – 13 November 1933
- Monarch: Carol II
- Preceded by: Iuliu Maniu
- Succeeded by: Ion G. Duca

President of the Assembly of Deputies
- In office 28 November 1919 – 1 December 1919
- Monarch: Ferdinand I
- Preceded by: Constantin Meissner
- Succeeded by: Nicolae Iorga
- In office 9 June 1939 – 5 September 1940
- Monarch: Carol II
- Preceded by: Nicolae Săveanu
- Succeeded by: None (Parliament suspended in September 1940)

Minister of Foreign Affairs of Romania
- In office 1 December 1919 – 9 January 1920
- Prime Minister: Himself
- Preceded by: Nicolae Mișu
- Succeeded by: Duiliu Zamfirescu

Minister of Internal Affairs
- In office 10 November 1928 – 7 June 1930
- Prime Minister: Iuliu Maniu
- Preceded by: Ion G. Duca
- Succeeded by: Mihai Popovici
- In office 13 June 1930 – 8 October 1930
- Prime Minister: Iuliu Maniu
- Preceded by: Mihai Popovici
- Succeeded by: Ion Mihalache
- In office 6 June 1932 – 10 August 1932
- Prime Minister: Himself
- Preceded by: Constantin Argetoianu (acting)
- Succeeded by: Ion Mihalache

President of the Romanian Front
- In office 12 March 1935 – 30 March 1938
- Succeeded by: Armand Călinescu (party merged with National Renaissance Front)

President of the National Peasants' Party
- In office January 1933 – March 1935
- Preceded by: Iuliu Maniu
- Succeeded by: Ion Mihalache

Personal details
- Born: 27 February 1872 Alparét, Austria-Hungary (now Bobâlna, Romania)
- Died: 19 March 1950 (aged 78) Sibiu, Romania
- Resting place: Church between the Fir trees
- Party: Romanian National Party (before 1926); National Peasants' Party (1926-1935); Romanian Front (1935-1938); National Renaissance Front (1938-1940)
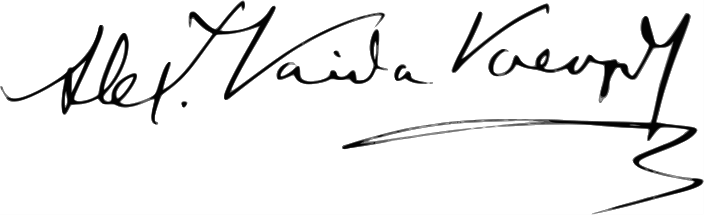
- Signature

Alexandru Vaida-Voevod or Vaida-Voievod (27 February 1872 – 19 March 1950) was an Austro-Hungarian-born Romanian politician who was a supporter and promoter of the union of Transylvania (before 1920 part of Hungary) with the Romanian Old Kingdom. He later served as 28th Prime Minister of Romania.

== Transylvanian politics ==
Vaida-Voevod was born to a Greek-Catholic family in the Transylvanian village of Alparét, Austria-Hungary (Romanian: Olpret, today Bobâlna, Romania). He studied at the Lutheran Gymnasium in Bistrița. Initially, Voevod was supportive of a plan to federalize the domains of the Habsburgs along the lines of a United States of Greater Austria, and was close to Archduke Franz Ferdinand.

In 1906, Vaida-Voevod joined a group of Romanian nationalists in the Budapest Parliament (the Romanian National Party of Transylvania and Banat), becoming an important opponent of the Hungarian governmental policy of Magyarization, and fought for the right of Transylvania to self-determination. Disappointed by the Austrian cause after Franz Ferdinand's assassination in Sarajevo, and turned towards an advocacy of Transylvania's union with Romania.

=== Union with Romania ===
In October 1918, United States President Woodrow Wilson's Fourteen Points were published in the German press. While in his native village of Olpret, Vaida-Voevod read about the Wilsonian principles in a newspaper from Munich, which made him realize that instead of demanding the federalization of Austria-Hungary, the only valid alternative was to push towards the union with the Romanian Kingdom. He drafted quickly a proposal in that respect and went to his good friend Iuliu Hossu in Gherla to seek his advice. Pondering over the words in the draft, they decided to replace the most radical proposal with the following generic statement: "Starting now, whatever the Great Powers will decide, the Romanian nation from Hungary and Transylvania is determined to rather perish than to endure slavery and subjugation any further".

On 18 October 1918, Vaida-Voevod presented this proposal in the Hungarian Diet, asking for the right to self-determination of the Romanians in Hungary. He began his discourse in a dull tone, then he suddenly read the declaration of self-determination, to the shock of his fellow deputies, who started to throw objects at him. Having prepared his exit in advance, Vaida-Voevod narrowly escaped lynching by leaving quickly through a back door of the Parliament building and hiding in a workers' neighborhood in Budapest, where many ethnic Romanians lived.

In December 1918, after the Aster Revolution when Hungary had become a republic, Vaida-Voevod was elected in the Great National Assembly of Alba Iulia that proclaimed the union with Romania, and was, alongside Vasile Goldiș, Iuliu Hossu, and Miron Cristea, a member of the Transylvanian group of envoys that presented the decision to King Ferdinand I in Bucharest.

== In Romania ==
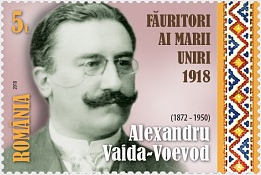
Vaida-Voevod on a 2018 stamp of Romania

Vaida-Voevod joined the Romanian delegation to the Paris Peace Conference of 1919, and was one of its most prominent members throughout the negotiations, as an organizer of press campaigns. During the conference, he joined the Masonic Grand Orient de France in order to secure a more advantageous position for his country.

=== First Term as Prime Minister ===
The elections of November 1919 were successful for his party, and Vaida-Voevod replaced the National Liberal Ion I. C. Brătianu as prime minister and Nicolae Mișu as foreign minister. He secured the demarcation lines by ordering Romanian troops to fight off the Hungarian Soviet Republic. However, Vaida-Voevod's radical approach toward the land reforms made King Ferdinand dissolve his government in March 1920, to be replaced by one formed by General Alexandru Averescu's People's Party (a populist movement that had attracted Brătianu's conditional support). Vaida-Voevod's party emerged as the National Peasants' Party in 1926, and he served as its leader. He also served twice as Interior Minister (1928–1930 and 1932).

=== Second and Third Cabinet ===
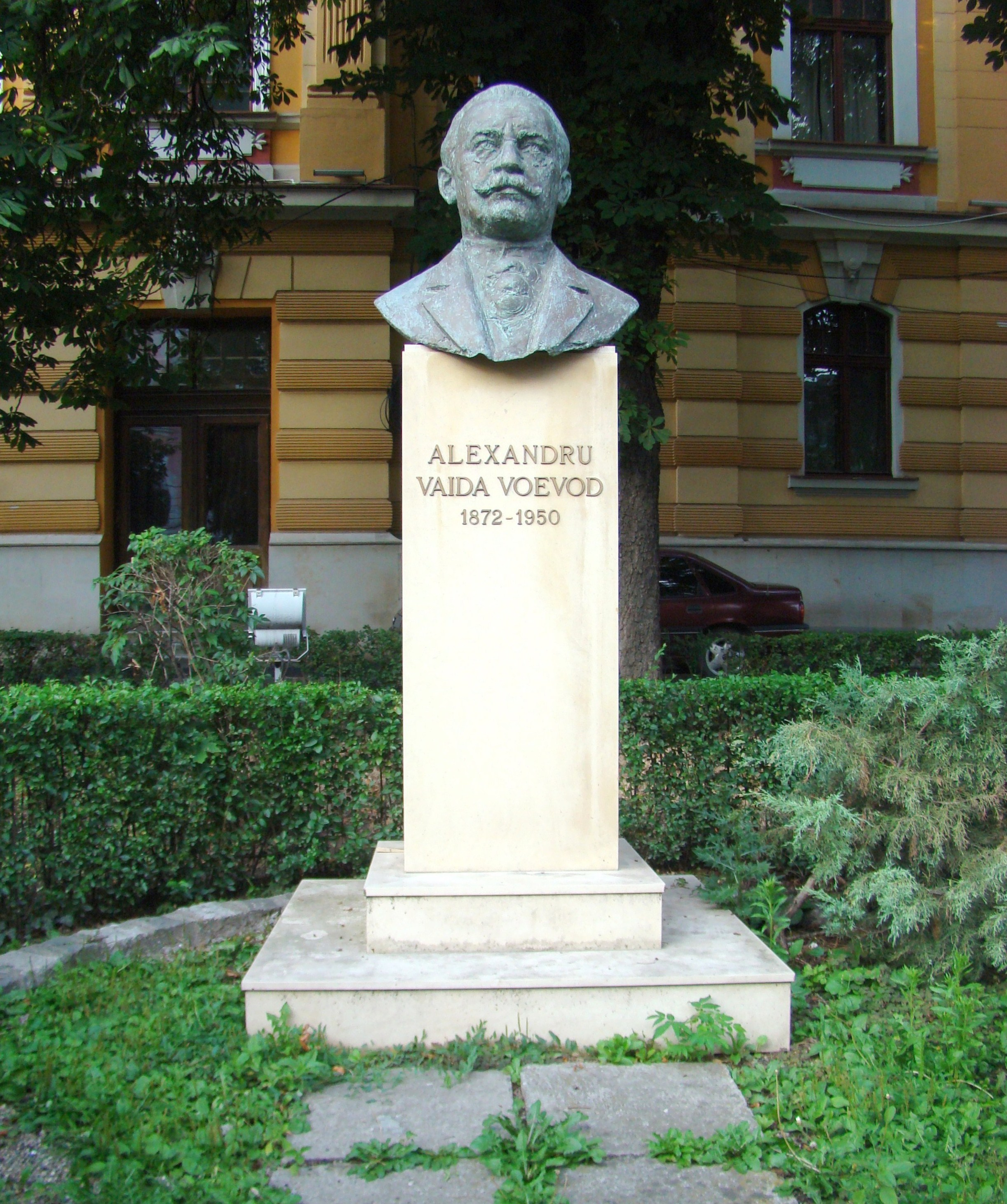
Bust of Vaida-Voevod in Cluj-Napoca

Vaida-Voevod's second cabinet existed from 11 August until 17 October 1932; he resigned and was succeeded by Iuliu Maniu. After Maniu resigned as prime minister in January 1933, Vaida-Voevod returned as prime minister.

"Vaida and his supporters, who formed the National Peasants' Party's right wing, were acting more like Liberals than Peasantists. They crushed strikes by oil workers in Ploiești and by railway workers in Bucharest in February 1933, dissolved Communist Party front organizations and all other 'anti-state' organizations, and proclaimed martial law in a number of cities."

Nonetheless, the problems posed by his new cabinets (in 1932 and 1933) – the Legionary Movement's intimidation of the political scene, and Vaida-Voevod's own antisemitism (which began to manifest itself in measures of repression encouraged by the Legionaries), led to a split between the prime minister and his Party. His second government fell because of Armand Călinescu, who was a staunch opponent of the Legionary Movement.

== Later ==
Vaida-Voevod with Ioan Victor Stârcea and Vojislav Marinković

On 25 February 1935, Vaida-Voevod created his own movement, the Romanian Front, which survived through the increasingly authoritarian regime of King Carol II, the National Legionary State, Ion Antonescu's regime and most of World War II. It was dissolved after King Michael's Coup of August 1944, when the Romanian Communist Party started gaining influence with Soviet backing. Nevertheless, the party never eluded obscurity in front of competition from the Legionaries, and its members were victims of the repression carried out by the communist regime after 1948. Vaida-Voevod was arrested on 24 March 1945. In 1946, he was put under house arrest in Sibiu, where he spent the remainder of his life. He died four years later.

== Bibliography ==
- Vasile Ciobanu, Activitatea diplomatică a lui Alexandru Vaida Voevod la Paris (1918) ("The Diplomatic Activities of Alexandru Vaida Voevod in Paris (1918)")
- Liviu Maior, Alexandru Vaida-Voevod între Belvedere și Versailles ("Alexandru Vaida-Voevod Between Belvedere and Versailles"), Cluj-Napoca, 1993
- Vasile Niculae, Ion Ilincioiu, Stelian Neagoe, Doctrina țărănistă în România. Antologie de texte ("Peasant Doctrine in Romania. Collected Texts"), Editura Noua Alternativă, Social Theory Institute of the Romanian Academy, Bucharest, 1994
- Ioan Scurtu (1973). "Mit și realitate. Alexandru Averescu" [Myth and Reality. Alexandru Averescu]. Magazin Istoric. Archived from the original on 15 July 2007.
