= Mihai Popovici =

Romanian politician

Mihai Popovici (21 October 1879 – 7 May 1966) was an Austro-Hungarian-born Romanian politician.

Born in Brașov, he studied at the local Romanian high school and then at the universities of Budapest and Vienna, earning an undergraduate degree in philosophy and a doctorate in law. He belonged to the Romanian National Party (PNR) and was active as an opinion journalist. After the PNR merged with the Peasants' Party in 1926 to form the National Peasants' Party (PNȚ), he became vice president of the new organization.

In 1916, when the Romanian Old Kingdom entered World War I, he enlisted in the Romanian Army and helped organize the Romanian Volunteer Corps in Russia. He belonged to the national committee of Romanian emigrants from Austria-Hungary, set up at Odessa in January 1918. That December, he took part in the assembly at Alba Iulia that approved the union of Transylvania with Romania. Popovici was subsequently elected to the temporary ruling authority in the province, the Directing Council. In 1919, he was elected to the Assembly of Deputies, in the first parliament of Greater Romania.

During the following decade, he held two ministerial posts: Public Works (December 1919-March 1920) and Finance (January 1927, November 1928-October 1929). He was among the PNȚ supporters of bringing Prince Carol, who had renounced his succession rights, to the Romanian throne. In 1926–1927, together with other prominent politicians, he visited Carol in Paris, urging him to take the throne. Popovici served as Interior Minister from 7 to 8 June 1930, in the cabinet of Gheorghe Mironescu that was charged by the regency acting on behalf of the minor King Michael with overseeing Carol's assumption of power. He subsequently held two more portfolios: Finance (June–October 1930, October 1930-April 1931) and Justice (October 1931-January 1933, January–November 1933).

Popovici remained close to the king as the latter became increasingly authoritarian, and during the National Renaissance Front regime promised him the PNȚ would not stand in his way. He took part in the 29–30 August 1940 session of the Crown Council that approved the cession of Northern Transylvania to Hungary. PNȚ leader Iuliu Maniu proposed Popovici as a minister in the subsequent government of Ion Antonescu, which the latter declined. In August 1947, in the wake of the Tămădău Affair and shortly before the establishment of a communist regime, he was arrested and incarcerated at Sighet prison. Released in July 1955, he died in Bucharest in 1966.
