= Iuliu Maniu =

Romanian politician (1873–1953)

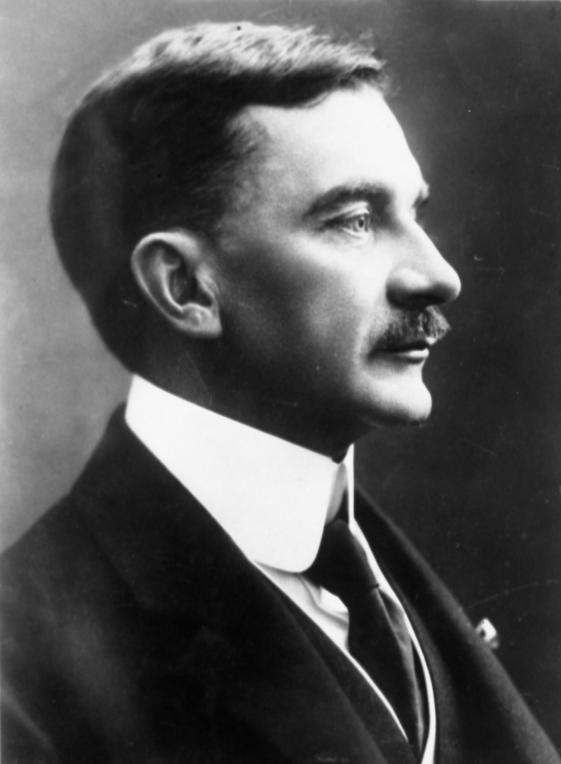

32nd Prime Minister of Romania
- In office 20 October 1932 – 13 January 1933
- Monarch: Carol II
- Preceded by: Alexandru Vaida-Voevod
- Succeeded by: Alexandru Vaida-Voevod
- In office 13 June 1930 – 9 October 1930
- Monarch: Carol II
- Preceded by: Gheorghe Mironescu
- Succeeded by: Gheorghe Mironescu
- In office 10 November 1928 – 6 June 1930
- Monarch: Michael I
- Preceded by: Vintilă Brătianu
- Succeeded by: Gheorghe Mironescu

Leader of the National Peasants' Party
- In office 10 October 1926 – June 1931
- Preceded by: Himself (as leader of the Romanian National Party); Ion Mihalache (as leader of the Peasants' Party)
- Succeeded by: Ion Mihalache
- In office July 1932 – January 1933
- Preceded by: Ion Mihalache
- Succeeded by: Alexandru Vaida-Voevod
- In office December 1937 – July 1947
- Preceded by: Ion Mihalache
- Succeeded by: None (Party dissolved)

President of the Romanian National Party
- In office 23 February 1919 – 10 October 1926
- Preceded by: Gheorghe Pop de Băsești
- Succeeded by: Himself (party merged into the National Peasants' Party)

Personal details
- Born: 8 January 1873 Szilágybadacsony, Austria-Hungary (now Bădăcin, part of Pericei, Romania)
- Died: 5 February 1953 (aged 80) Sighet Prison, Romania
- Party: Romanian National Party (1890–1926); National Peasants' Party (1926–1947)
- Education: Franz Joseph University; University of Budapest; University of Vienna
- Profession: Lawyer
- Religion: Greek-Catholic

Iuliu Maniu (Romanian pronunciation: [ˈjulju maˈni.u]; 8 January 1873 – 5 February 1953) was a Romanian lawyer and politician. He was a leader of the National Party of Transylvania and Banat before and after World War I, playing an important role in the Union of Transylvania with Romania.

Maniu served as Prime Minister of Romania for three terms during 1928–1933, and, with Ion Mihalache, co-founded the National Peasants' Party. Arrested by the ascendant communist authorities in 1947 as a result of the Tămădău affair, he was convicted of treason in a show trial and sent to Sighet Prison, where he died six years later.

== Early years ==
Maniu was born to an ethnic Romanian family in Szilágybadacsony, Austria-Hungary (now Bădăcin, in Romania's Sălaj County); his parents were Ioan Maniu and Clara Maniu. He finished the Calvinist College in Zalău in 1890, and studied law at Franz Joseph University in Cluj-Napoca, then at the University of Budapest and the University of Vienna, being awarded the doctorate in 1896.

Maniu joined the Romanian National Party of Transylvania and Banat (PNR), became a member of its collective leadership body in 1897, and represented it in the Budapest Parliament on several occasions. He settled in Blaj, and served as a lawyer for the Greek Catholic Church (to which he belonged). Maniu was influenced by the activity of Simion Bărnuțiu, a maternal uncle of his father, Ioan Maniu.

After serving as an advisor for Archduke Franz Ferdinand, counseling on the latter's projects to redefine the Habsburg states along the lines of a United States of Greater Austria, Maniu moved towards the option of a union with the Romanian Old Kingdom when the Archduke was assassinated in Sarajevo in 1914.

== PNR leadership ==
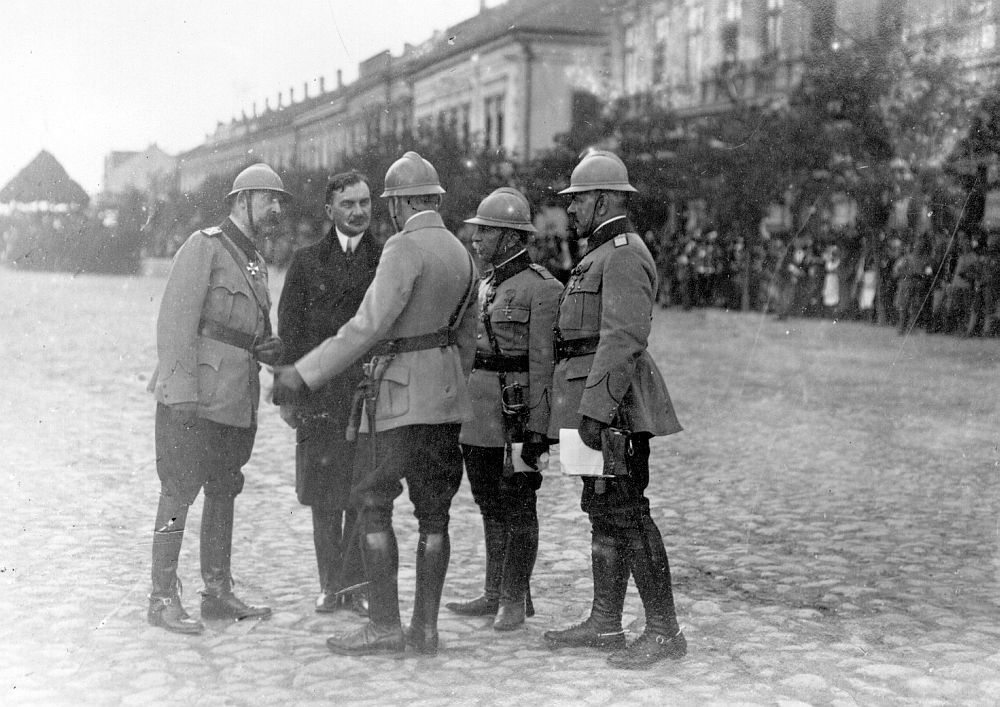
King Ferdinand with Maniu and generals Constantin Prezan, Gheorghe Mărdărescu, and Ștefan Panaitescu at Békéscsaba, 24 May 1919

Together with such figures as Vasile Goldiș, Gheorghe Pop de Băsești, the Romanian Orthodox cleric Miron Cristea, and Alexandru Vaida-Voevod, Maniu engaged in an intensive unionist campaign, leading to the Great National Assembly of Alba Iulia on 1 December 1918, during which Romanians demanded separation from Austria-Hungary. On 2 December, Maniu became head of Transylvania's Directory Council – a position equivalent to interim governorship.

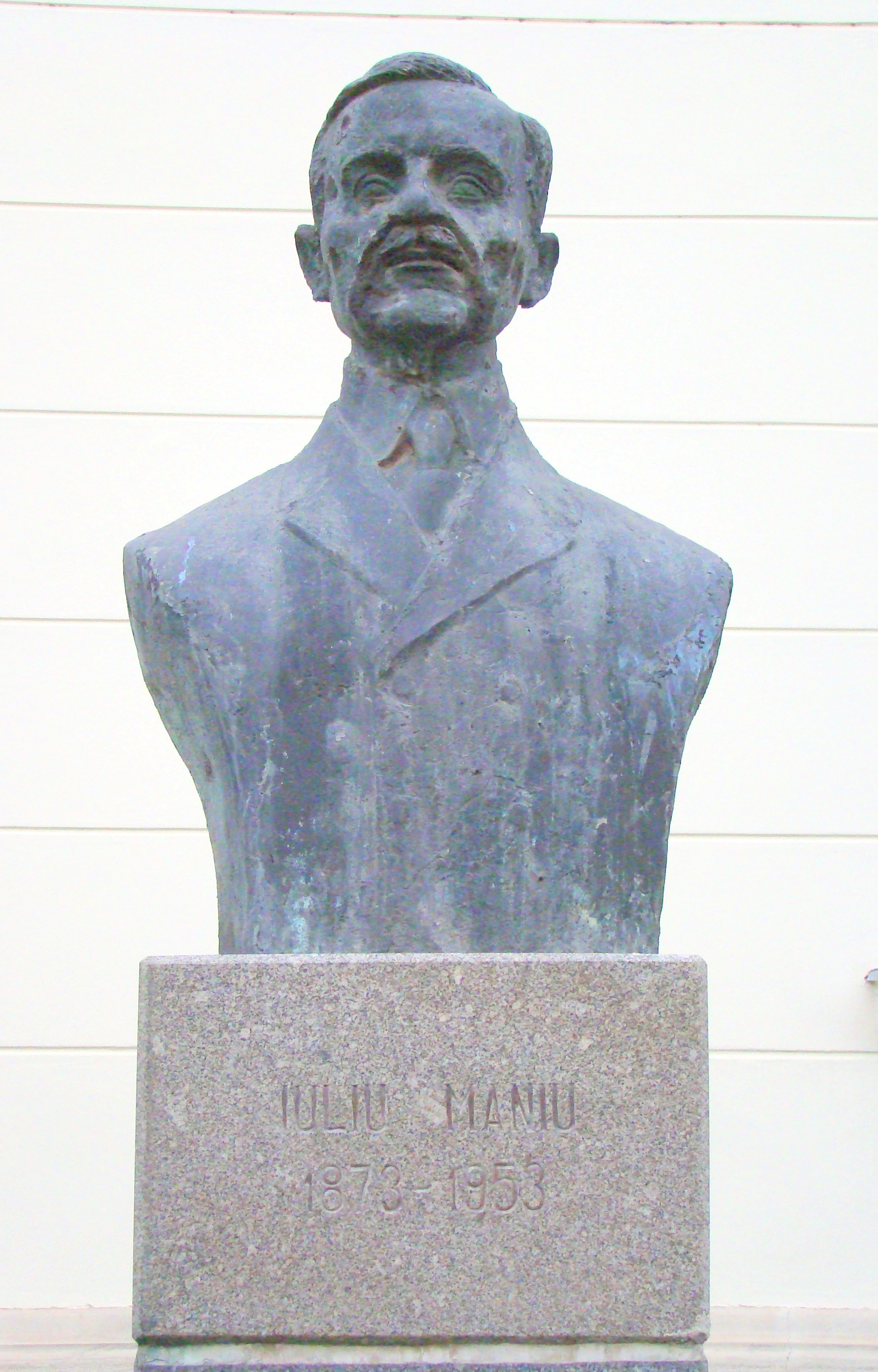
Bust of Iuliu Maniu in Alba Iulia

In May 1919, during the Hungarian–Romanian War, he accompanied King Ferdinand I and Queen Marie on a visit to Alba Iulia, Oradea, and Carei, and a meeting with the frontline troops at Békéscsaba.

After the creation of Greater Romania, the PNR formed the government in Bucharest – a cabinet led by Alexandru Vaida-Voevod and allied with Ion Mihalache's Peasants' Party. It entered in competition with one of the traditional parties of the Romanian Kingdom, the National Liberal Party, and with its leader Ion I. C. Brătianu, when the Peasants' Party deadlocked the Parliament of Romania with calls for a widespread land reform.

After King Ferdinand dissolved Parliament, Iuliu Maniu found himself at odds with the national leadership, especially after the new Prime Minister Alexandru Averescu, with support from the National Liberals, dissolved the Transylvanian Council in April 1920. Consequently, Maniu refused to attend King Ferdinand's Crowning ceremony as King of Greater Romania (held in Alba Iulia, in 1922), seeing it as an attempt to tie multi-religious Transylvania to Orthodoxy. At the same time, the PNR rejected the centralization imposed by the 1923 Constitution favored by Brătianu, and demanded that any constitutional reform be passed by a Constituent Assembly, and not by a regular vote in Parliament. Citing fears that the PNL had ensured a grip over Romanian politics, the PNR and the Peasants' Party united in 1926, with Maniu becoming the President of the new political force, the National Peasants' Party (PNȚ), for the following seven years, and then again between 1937 and 1947.

== PNȚ in interwar Romania ==
Despite its success in elections, the PNȚ was blocked out of government by the Royal Prerogative of King Ferdinand, who had preferred to nominate Ion I. C. Brătianu, Alexandru Averescu, and Prince Barbu Știrbey. Maniu publicly protested, and attempted to organize a peasants' march on Bucharest as a public show of support modeled on the Alba Iulia assembly. He also showed himself open to deals proposed by Viscount Rothermere regarding a review of the Treaty of Trianon and, as King Ferdinand's death approached, started negotiations with the disinherited Prince Carol (King Ferdinand's son), proposing that the latter bypass the Constitution and crown himself in Alba Iulia (as a new foundation for the Romanian Kingdom). Talks with Carol were ended abruptly after the Romanian authorities called on the United Kingdom to expel the Prince from its territory.

The PNȚ first came to power in November 1928, after both King Ferdinand and Brătianu had died. During the elections of that year, the party allied itself with the Romanian Social Democratic Party and the German Party. In 1930, Maniu manoeuvered against the Constitution, and, together with Gheorghe Mironescu, brought about Carol's return and deposition of his son Michael. However, Carol did not respect the terms of his agreement with Maniu, refusing to resume his marriage to Queen Elena. After alternating governments of Maniu and Vaida-Voevod that had brought the party into conflict with the King's inner circle and with his lover, Magda Lupescu, during its tenure his government was faced with a strike by coal miners in the Jiu Valley and major social and economic problems caused by the Great Depression in Romania. Maniu resigned for the third and final time on 13 January 1933, due to his ongoing conflict with King Carol II.

== Under successive dictatorships ==
The country moved towards an authoritarian regime formed around Carol and prompted by the rapid growth of the fascist Iron Guard. In 1937, Maniu agreed to sign an electoral pact with the Iron Guard's Corneliu Zelea Codreanu, in the hope that this would block the monarch's maneuvers. The king instead sought an agreement with other members of the political class, including the National Liberal Ion Duca and the former PNȚ politician Armand Călinescu, while clamping down on the Iron Guard – leading to a wave of similar actions of reprisal.

With the loss of Northern Transylvania, Bessarabia, Northern Bukovina, and Southern Dobruja in 1940, Carol II conceded power and exiled himself, leading to the creation of the National Legionary State around the Iron Guard and General Ion Antonescu, a regime which aligned Romania with Nazi Germany and the Axis. The PNȚ survived in semi-clandestinity and, after Antonescu purged the legionnaires, achieved some unofficial status when Maniu began holding talks with the general over several issues, notably calling for an end to the persecution of the Jews and to their deportation to Transnistria. In a July 18, 1941 memorandum to Romania's military dictator Ion Antonescu, the National Peasants' Party leader Iuliu Maniu protested in two paragraphs against the massacres of Bessarabian and northern Bukovinian Jews as well as the Iași pogrom. Iuliu Maniu condemned the deportations of Jews to Transnistria and he intervened to Ion Antonescu so that the latter would stop the deportations. He remained an opponent of Antonescu, a view which he balanced with his adversity towards the Soviet Union, and joined the plotters of the pro-Allied royal coup d'état of 23 August 1944, while also expressing his resentment towards the involvement of the Romanian Communist Party (PCR) in the planning process as well as the execution of the coup.

== Anticommunism ==
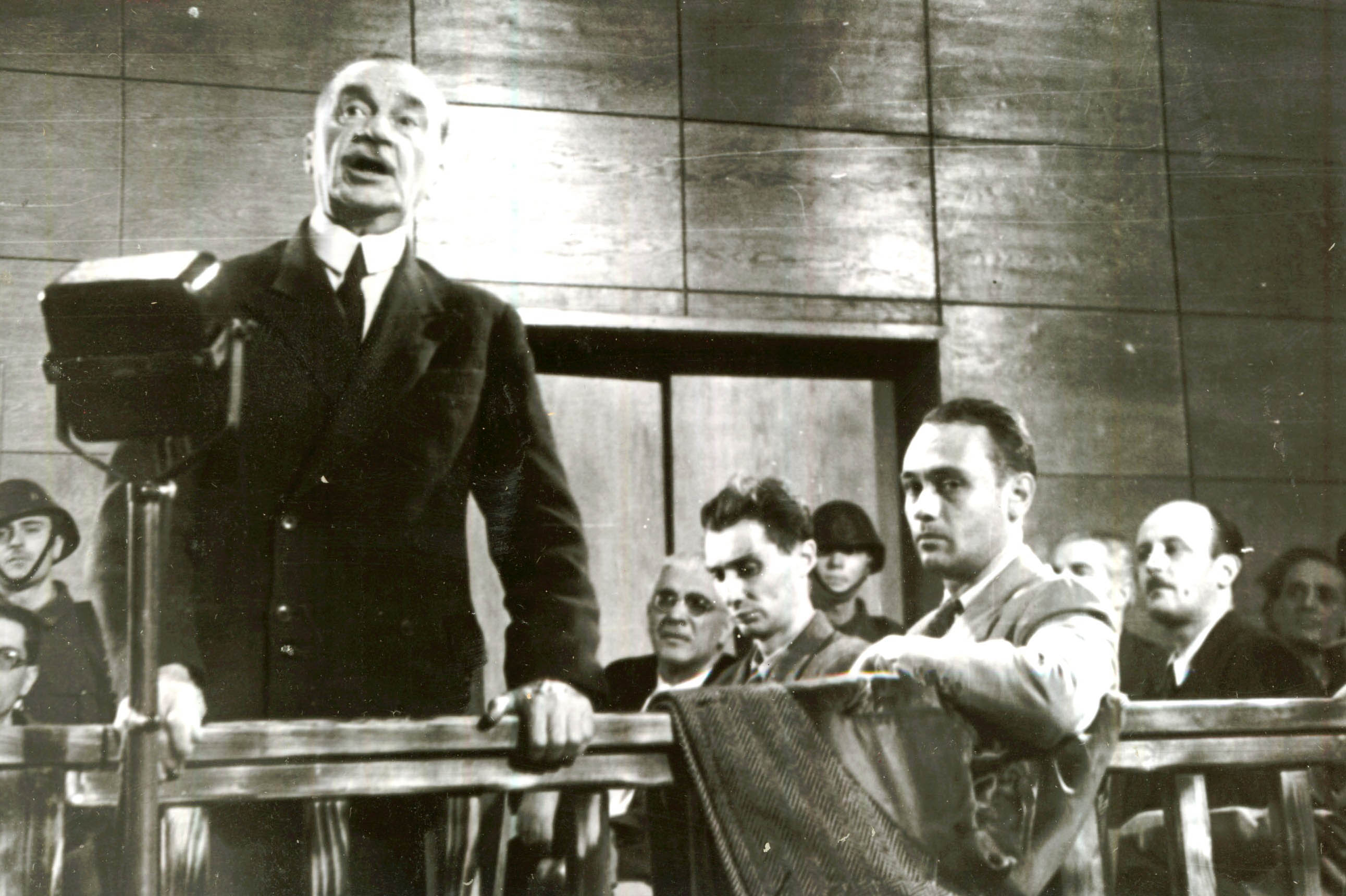
Maniu's last appeal at his trial, November 11, 1947

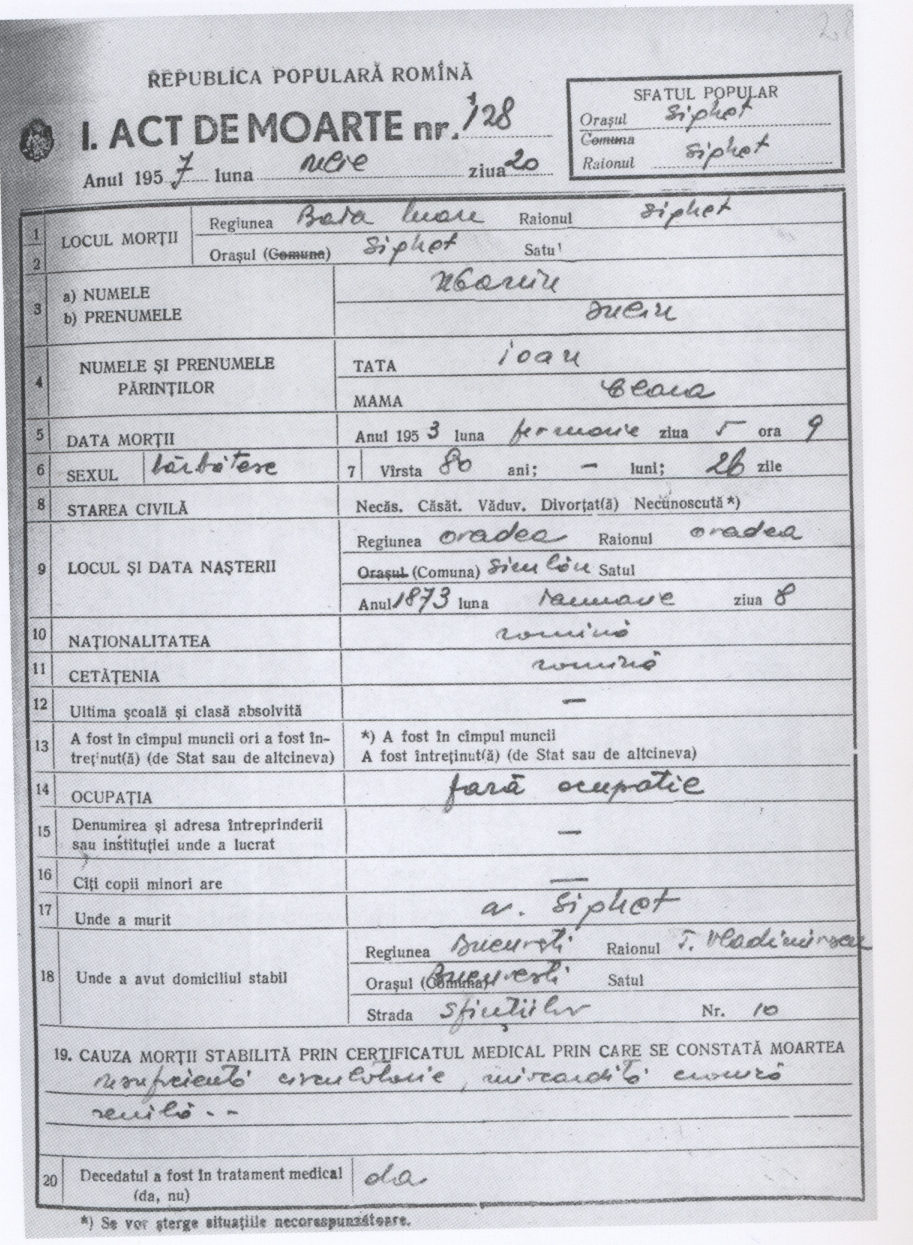
Iuliu Maniu's death certificate, 1953

Subsequently, Maniu was a prominent supporter of the Western Allies and one of the main adversaries of the growing Soviet influence in Romania. His party became the predilect target of PCR hostility, PNȚ supporters and Communists engaging in several street fights in February 1945. Regarding this, Christian Science Monitor correspondent Reuben Markham wrote:

"This man, in his seventies, who holds no meetings, makes no public speeches, publishes no articles, possesses no wealth, and is not allowed to answer one single calumny hurled against him, seems to have filled the Government with fear." "This is shown by the... unprecedented storm of attacks which the Government has launched against Dr. Maniu... day and night."

The PNȚ finished a distant second in the November 1946 general election with 33 seats, well behind the PCR-dominated Bloc of Democratic Parties (BPD). After the fall of Communism in 1989, some authors went as far as to claim that the PNȚ had actually won the election but was denied victory because of widespread electoral fraud on the part of the pro-Communist Petru Groza government. Later, historian Petre Țurlea reviewed a confidential Communist Party report about the election that revealed the BPD had actually come up short of a majority. Țurlea concluded that, had the election been conducted honestly, the PNȚ and the other opposition parties could have won enough votes between themselves to form a coalition government, albeit with far less than the 80 percent support long claimed by opposition supporters.

After 1946, the PNȚ was sidelined, with the PCR ensuring the collaboration of several former party members, such as Nicolae L. Lupu and Anton Alexandrescu.

In a telegram to the State Department, the U.S. representative in Romania, Burton Y. Berry, wrote:

"The Department well knows that Maniu has stood out boldly as a champion of pro-Allied action and sentiment in Rumania even during the dark days of the Antonescu dictatorship. He has an enormous political following in the country and I believe the respect in which all Rumanians hold him eclipses that held for any other Rumanian. Because of what he has been and what he is it seems important that he be preserved from slipping into sharing the general conviction that the dissolution of the Rumanian state is now in progress." Furthermore, Reuben Markham wrote that Maniu "has become far more than a political leader — he is a national legend."

The party was outlawed in July 1947. That same month, Ion Mihalache attempted to flee the country by airplane, allegedly with the purpose of establishing a government-in-exile, but ended up landing at Tămădău (see Tămădău affair). The attempt to flee was judged as an act of treason, and both Maniu and Mihalache faced a kangaroo court that sentenced them to life imprisonment with hard labour in November 1947. Given their advanced age, this punishment amounted to a death sentence. The show trial signaled the beginning of the repression against opposition groups in post-war Romania.

== Death ==
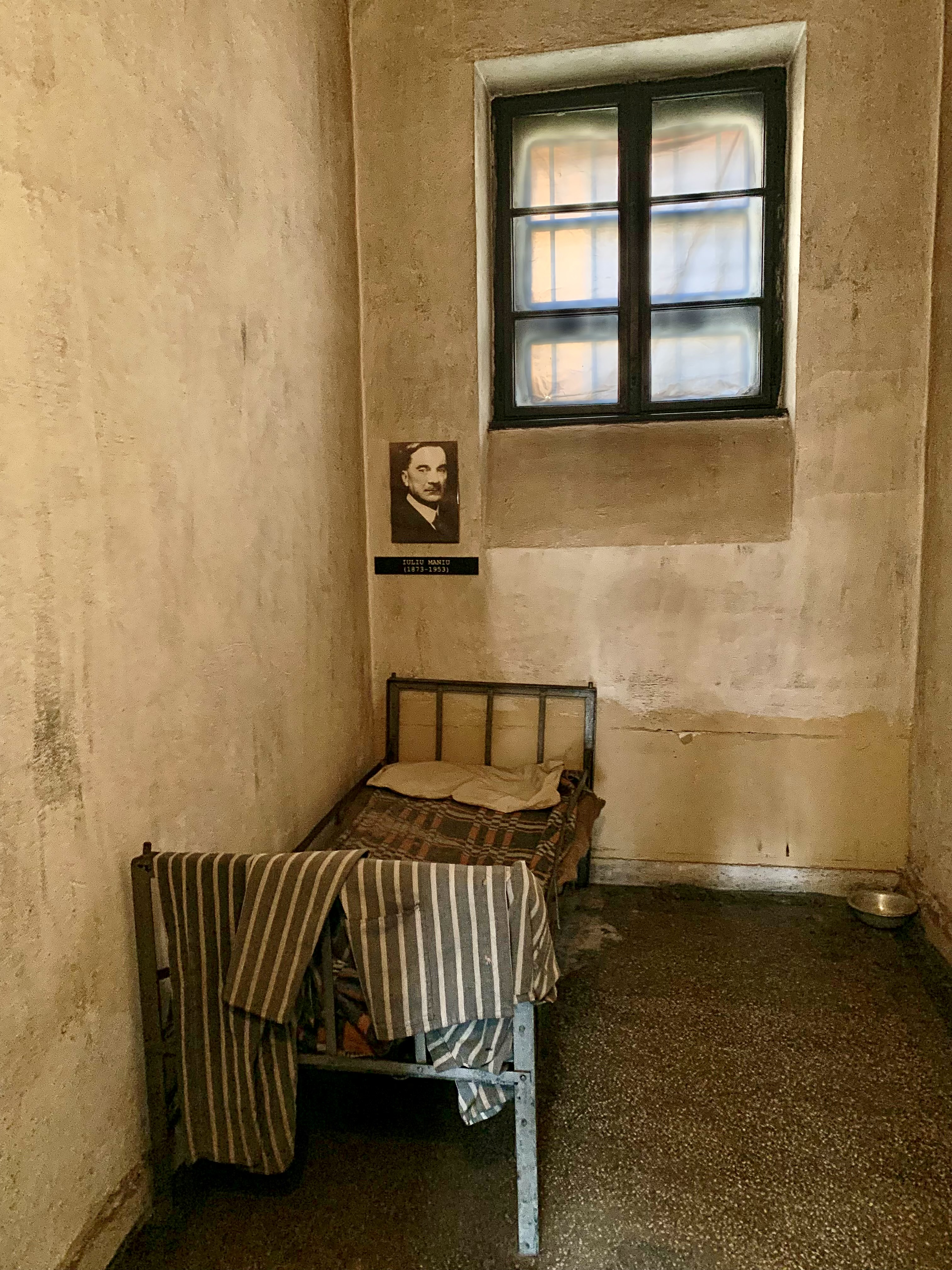
The cell where Iuliu Maniu died, preserved in situ at the Sighet Prison Museum

Iuliu Maniu died in 1953 in Sighet Prison, and his body was thrown into the common grave in the prison courtyard. The official death certificate listed his occupation as "unemployed", and the death cause as circulatory failure and chronic myocarditis.

On November 12, 1998, the High Court of Cassation and Justice ordered the rehabilitation of Maniu and removed the additional punishment of confiscation of property, pronounced in 1947.

Christian minister Richard Wurmbrand, who also was a political prisoner in Romania, claims in his book Tortured for Christ, that the last words of Iuliu Maniu were: "If the Communists are overthrown in our country, it will be the most holy duty of every Christian to go into the streets and, at the risk of their own life, defend the Communists from the righteous fury of the multitudes whom they have tyrannized".

== Legacy ==
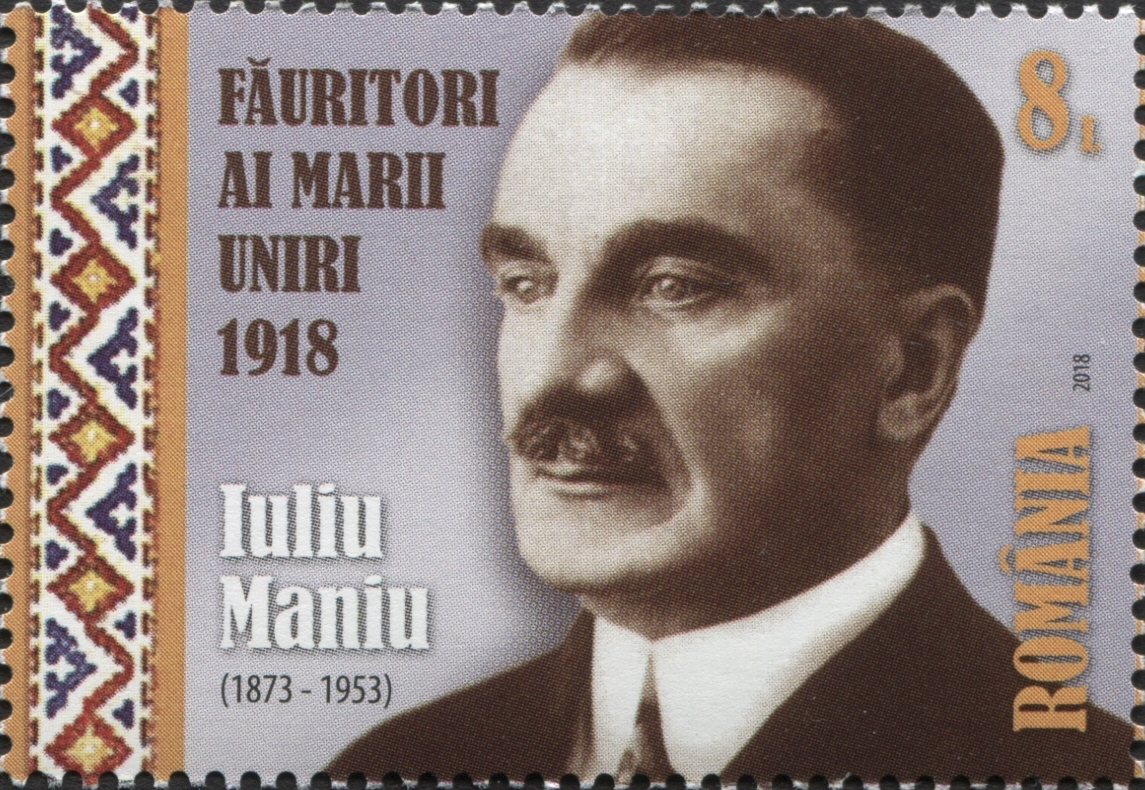
Maniu on a Romanian stamp from 2018 commemorating the 100th anniversary of the Great Union

A bust of Maniu was placed in Bucharest's Revolution Square, in front of the building of the former Central Committee of the Romanian Communist Party (from where Nicolae Ceaușescu and his wife fled by helicopter on 22 December 1989). Sculpted in bronze by Mircea Corneliu Spătaru, the monument was inaugurated on 1 December 1998, on the 80th anniversary of Great Union Day. There are also busts of Maniu in Alba Iulia, Bădăcin, Baia Mare, Satu Mare, Șimleu Silvaniei, and Zalău.

One of the main thoroughfares in Bucharest is the Iuliu Maniu Boulevard, which runs from the A1 motorway to the Lion's Plaza for a length of 6.8 km (4.2 mi). There are also streets and boulevards named after him in Arad, Brașov, Bucharest, Cluj-Napoca, Deva, Oradea, Satu Mare, Timișoara, and Tulcea, as well as high schools that bear his name in Bucharest, Carei, Oradea, and Șimleu Silvaniei.

Maniu appears on two postage stamps emitted by Poșta Română, one from 1993 and one from 2018, both commemorating Great Union Day.
