= Gheorghe Mironescu =

Romanian politician (1874–1949)

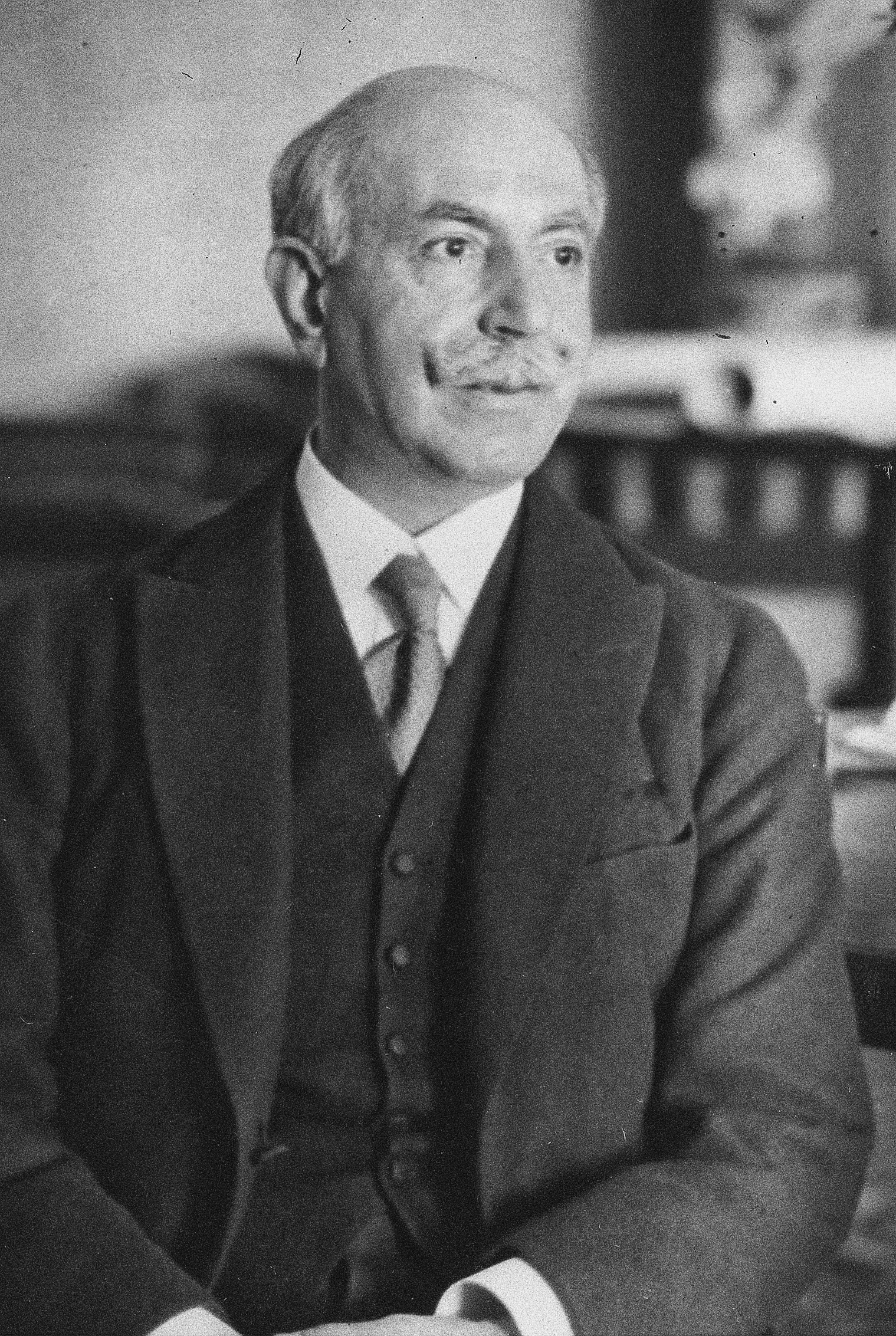

33rd Prime Minister of Romania
- In office June 7, 1930 – June 12, 1930; October 10, 1930 – April 17, 1931
- Monarch: Carol II
- Preceded by: Iuliu Maniu; Iuliu Maniu
- Succeeded by: Iuliu Maniu; Nicolae Iorga

Vice President of the Council of Ministers and Minister of the Interior
- In office 14 January 1933 – 13 November 1933
- Prime Minister: Alexandru Vaida-Voevod
- Preceded by: Ion Mihalache
- Succeeded by: Ion Inculeț

Personal details
- Born: 28 January 1874 Vaslui, Romania
- Died: 8 October 1949 (aged 75) Bucharest, Romania
- Party: National Peasants' Party

Gheorghe G. Mironescu, commonly known as G. G. Mironescu (January 28, 1874 – October 8, 1949), was a Romanian politician, member of the National Peasants' Party (PNȚ), who served as Prime Minister of Romania for two terms.

== Biography ==
Born in Vaslui, Mironescu graduated from the University of Bucharest's law faculty in 1894 and from its literature and philosophy faculty the following year. In 1898, he earned a doctorate in law from the Faculty of Law of Paris (University of Paris). In 1900, he was named prosecutor at the Ilfov County tribunal, and served as state's attorney from 1900 to 1901. He was a professor of law at his alma mater from 1903 to 1939, and in 1938 was elected an honorary member of the Romanian Academy. Initially joining the Conservative Party, he switched to Take Ionescu's new Conservative-Democratic Party in 1908. An advocate of Romania's entering World War I on the side of the Allies, he was in Paris from 1917 to 1918, writing editorials in the French press and particularly in La Roumanie. In late 1922, he entered the Romanian National Party, which became the PNȚ in 1926. Elected to the Assembly of Deputies in 1911, he became a Senator in 1914.

His first stint in government was in Ionescu's cabinet, from December 1921 until the following month, when he served as Education Minister. After 1926, he became one of the most recognizable PNȚ leaders, the main figure of a pro-authoritarian faction bitterly opposed to left-wing groups such as those of Nicolae L. Lupu, Petre Andrei, Mihai Ralea, and Armand Călinescu. From November 1928 to October 1930, he served as Foreign Minister in Iuliu Maniu's first two cabinets. As such, he participated in the two Hague conferences on reparations, and backed Aristide Briand's proposal for a Federal Europe.

In 1930, Carol II of Romania returned incognito to Romania (with a fake passport). On the morning of June 7, 1930, the Government convened Parliament in order to cancel the act of January 4, 1926, through which Carol had renounced the throne. Carol was proclaimed the new King of Romania, replacing his own son Michael. Maniu resigned, and a new PNȚ government was formed, under the leadership of Gheorghe Mironescu, restoring Carol II to the throne on June 8, 1930. The cabinet was welcomed by regent Nicholas with the words:

"You are called on to fulfill King Ferdinand's dream, and you are the most qualified to do it."

The PNȚ subsequently repealed the 1926 laws preventing Carol from inheriting the Crown, and faced a constitutional crisis after Constantin Sărățeanu and Patriarch Miron Cristea resigned from the regency in protest. The impasse was quickly prevented, as the two chambers of parliament passed legislation awarding Carol the crown and awarding Michael the honorary dignity of Grand Voivode of Alba Iulia. That same evening, Mironescu resigned in order for the king to name a new government.

The king's project for a broad-coalition government was not accomplished: Carol offered the appointment to Maniu (who cited health reasons in his refusal, but was in fact disappointed by Carol's ongoing scandalous relationship with Magda Lupescu) and then to General Constantin Prezan (who was rejected by the National Liberal Party). Eventually, the king renounced the project, recognized the mandate of Maniu as majority leader, and conceded to a regular cabinet. Mironescu remained in office as Foreign Minister for the duration of his premiership.

His second time in office, with Ion Mihalache as Minister of Internal Affairs and Carol's supporter Mihail Manoilescu as Minister of the Economy, was marked by the outlawing of the far right movement known as the Iron Guard and the arrest of its leader Corneliu Zelea Codreanu (who was later tried and acquitted). Nevertheless, Mironescu was to contribute to the appeal of fascism: his was the first in a series of governments that, faced with the Great Depression, reduced salaries for state employees, who soon began supporting the revolutionary solutions advanced by Codreanu. Other economic measures he took included contracting a foreign loan, ending export taxes on agricultural products and initiating a road-building project. The cabinet was ultimately ousted by the king himself, who nominated an attempted technocracy under Nicolae Iorga (aiming to provide a mask for Carol's camarilla). In Alexandru Vaida-Voevod's government, he was Finance Minister from June to August 1932 and Interior Minister from January to November 1933. He also served as deputy prime minister from October 1932 until November 1933.

In early 1943, during World War II, Mironescu was given a mandate to approach the leadership of Miklós Horthy's Hungary, in an attempt by Romania's Ion Antonescu to have both countries achieve a new territorial settlement and a common withdrawal from the Axis powers (see also Romania during World War II); he began talks with Miklós Bánffy's delegation in Bucharest (June 9), but these negotiations ended when the two sides could not agree on a future status for Northern Transylvania, a region held by Hungary at the time.

He died in Bucharest in 1949.
