= People's Party (Romania, 1918–38) =

Romanian political party

People's Party Partidul Poporului
- President: Alexandru Averescu (1918–1938); P. P. Negulescu (1938)
- Founder: Constantin Argetoianu, Matei B. Cantacuzino
- Founded: April 3, 1918
- Dissolved: 1938
- Split from: Conservative Party
- Merged into: National Renaissance Front
- Succeeded by: People's Party – Dan Diaconescu (claimed, not legal successor)
- Headquarters: Calea Victoriei 39, Bucharest
- Newspaper: Îndreptarea
- Veterans' wing: Cultul Patriei
- Ideology: Populism; Factions: Conservatism; Social liberalism Fascism; Republicanism
- Colours: Yellow

The People's Party (Romanian: Partidul Poporului, PP), originally People's League (Liga Poporului), was an eclectic, essentially populist, mass movement in Romania. Created by World War I hero Alexandru Averescu, it identified itself with the new politics of "Greater Romania" period, and existed for almost as long as Greater Romania did. The PP broke with the antiquated two-party system, creating a wide coalition of lobbies, and advertised itself as the new challenge to the National Liberal Party (PNL). The group was held together by Averescu's charisma, and was popularly known as partidul averescan, "the Averescan party".

In its early years, the League brought together members of the moribund Conservative Party and social reformers of diverse backgrounds, and secured for itself the votes of poor peasants and demobilized soldiers. Its platform appealed to antisemites and Jews, social liberals and fascists, loyalists and republicans. Averescu's doubts about staging a revolution, and to some degree the Averescans' rejection of political radicalism, meant that the League was pushed into a partnership with the PNL. Averescu's rise to power was confirmed in the 1920 election and then by his heavy-handed approach to labor unrest. The government initiated sweeping reforms, but was brought down when it rebelled against the PNL's paternalism.

Victorious in the 1926 election, the PP became a direct opponent of the National Peasants' Party, and lost the PNL's tactical support. It failed to regroup itself and, in 1932, was divided in half—its radical wing having become the National Agrarian Party. The PP continued as a marginal presence in political life, steadily losing votes to the fascist and antisemitic parties. It was officially dissolved along with all other democratic parties in early 1938, by which time it had been forced to register Averescu's own resignation.

== History ==
=== Origins ===
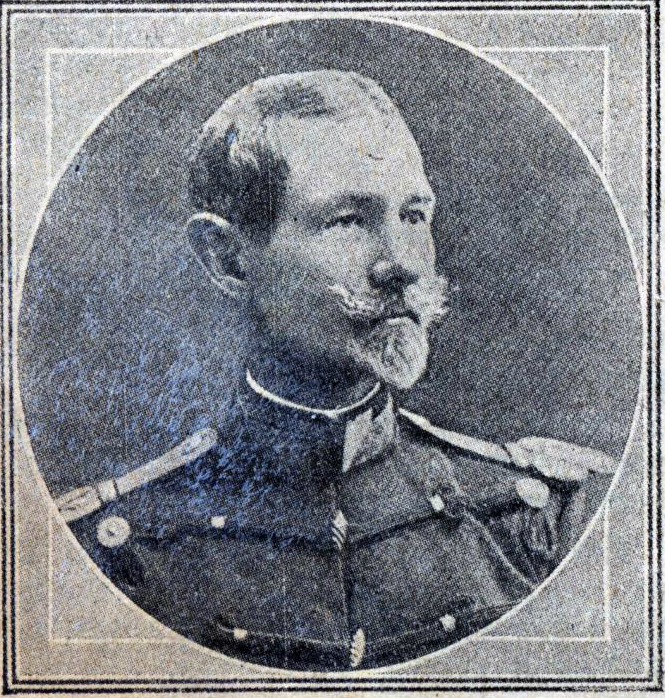
Alexandru Averescu

Averscan populism had its roots firmly planted in the troubled years of World War I, and was a direct answer to the military disaster of 1917. In summer 1916, keeping up with the orthodox irredentist ("Greater Romanian") agenda, a PNL-governed Romania had joined the Entente Powers. The general mood was one of romantic optimism, which cast away Romania's endemic social problems, including the stringent issues of electoral and land reform: the majority of Romanian conscripts were landless peasants, rendered politically marginal by the census suffrage.

Although "Greater Romanian" plans were already in circulation, the "Old Kingdom" found itself tackled by social conflicts. Tensions exploded with the 1907 Peasants' Revolt, when General Averescu was called on by the PNL to organize the violent repression. This incident was later invoked against his claim to represent the interests of Romanian peasants. It was also the start of a bitter rivalry between Averescu and the PNL Prime Minister, Ion I. C. Brătianu. From 1918 to 1927, their problematic relationship was to be a national affair, affecting the course of Romanian politics. As historian Gheorghe I. Florescu writes, in the course of it Brătianu went from a "manic" mistrust of Averescu to a more benevolent arrogance.

Between 1907 and the entry into the world war, the PNL governments had been under pressure to generate a feasible land reform project. Even more reluctant, the opposition Conservatives became split into factions: the traditional wing, led by Alexandru Marghiloman, was "Germanophile", and reserved about the "Greater Romania" project; the Conservative-Democratic Party, under Take Ionescu, had a history of cooperation with the PNL, and gave full endorsement to the Entente. Before the war, Averescu tended to support the Conservative side, gravitating between Marghiloman and Ionescu.

The 1916 attempt to swiftly conquer Transylvania and Bukovina from Austria-Hungary was unsuccessful, and Romania found herself invaded by the Central Powers. Supported by the Russian Empire, the Romanian authorities only held on to the easternmost area, Moldavia, and it was there that General Averescu helped organize a territorial defense. The death toll became massive: by 1919, perhaps one tenth of Romania's population had been lost to the war. King Ferdinand I, the PNL government, and some of the opposition were in consensus about keeping up resistance. Visiting his peasant troops in April 1917, Ferdinand issued a formal promise of land reform, and hinted that some political reform was also being considered.

However, the February Revolution in Russia dealt a serious blow to military cooperation in Moldavia—Russia's Provisional Government was largely unable to control its military. The October Revolution, and then the Treaty of Brest-Litovsk, left Romania without allied support, a passive witness to the Russian Civil War. Faced with the prospect of an all-out Central Powers' offensive in Moldavia, Ferdinand made Averescu his prime minister. To the PNL, he was an enigma: some perceived him as a dangerous pacifist, a Conservative, or an "undertaker" of the historic parties; others believed him a convenient figurehead, who diverted attention from Brătianu's maneuvering. He was expected to negotiate a dignified peace between Romania and her enemies, but was unable to obtain the necessary consensus, and handed in his resignation; a Conservative and "Germanophile" government was sworn in, and its leader Marghiloman sealed the Peace of Buftea-Bucharest, noted for its demeaning concessions to the Central Powers.

=== Creating the League ===
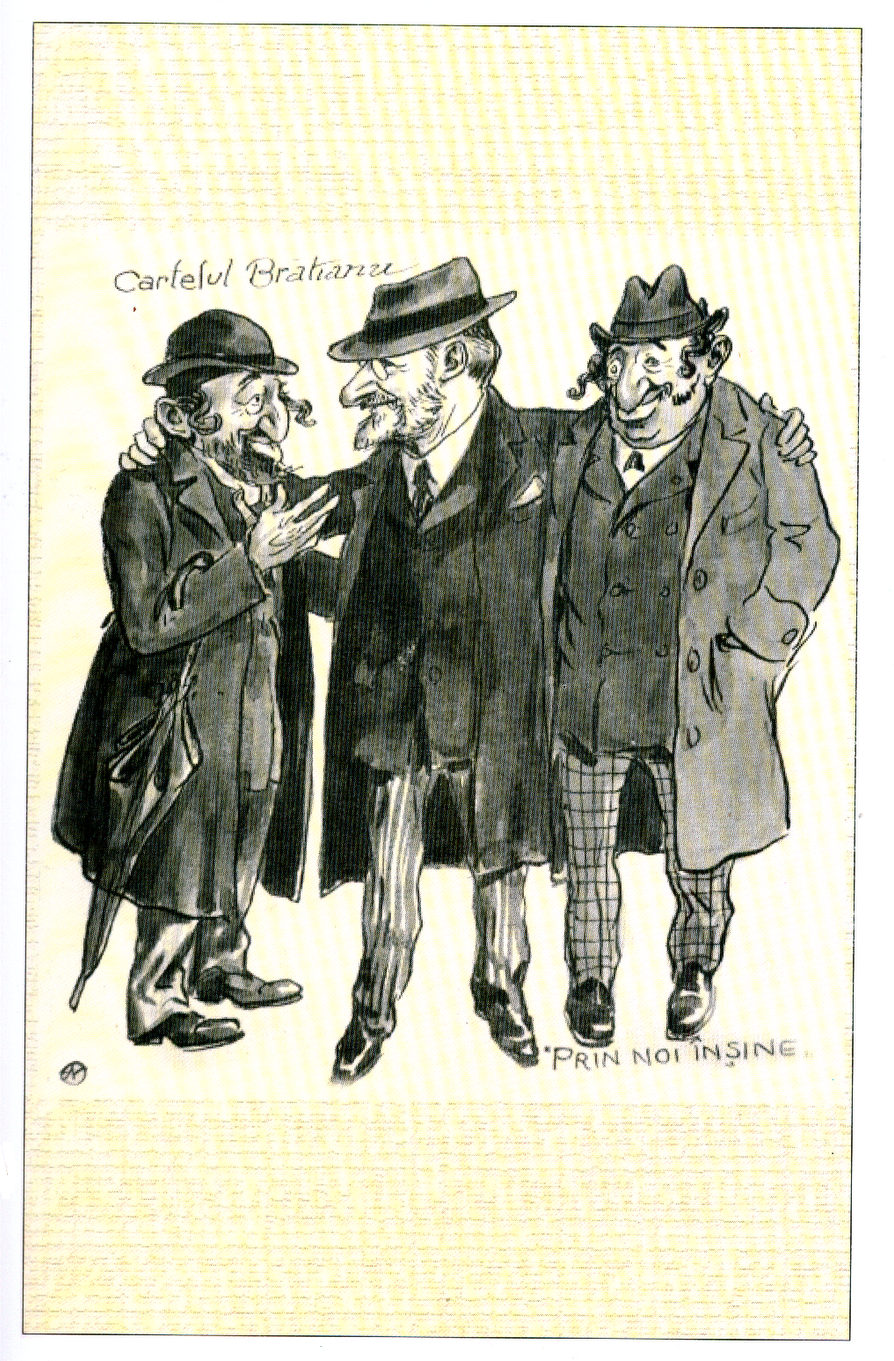
"The Brătianu family cartel". A hostile portrayal (with an antisemitic tinge) by Nicolae Petrescu-Găină. Indicative of the mix of feelings that went into creating anti-establishment parties such as the League

Ruling over a vaguely defined Romanian territory, the Marghiloman cabinet took it upon itself to carry out the reforms. In a mood of general hostility toward the PNL, it focused on dismantling the National Liberal institutions, promising to build the country on new foundations.

It was in this climate that Averescu created his People's League, on April 3, 1918. Its nucleus was a personal association between Averescu and the Conservative dissenters Constantin Argetoianu and Matei Cantacuzino. The association was formed at Cantacuzino's townhouse in Iași, and also counted among its founding members the Conservatives Duiliu Zamfirescu, Constantin C. Arion and Grigore Filipescu, soldiers Grigore C. Crăiniceanu, Sebastian S. Eustatziu and Gheorghe Văleanu, and political philosopher P. P. Negulescu. Through the affiliations of Negulescu and Ion Petrovici, the League established a connection with the doctrines of Old Kingdom liberal conservatism, as codified in the 19th century by philosopher Titu Maiorescu.

In occupied Bucharest, the People's League was supported by a parallel "League of Common Good", founded by physicist Enric Otetelișanu. He later helped set up Averescan clubs in northern Muntenia. On the left side, the early League incorporated a Moldavian radical-left wing, or "Labor Party", represented by Grigore Trancu-Iași and other activists. From the very first moment, the Averescans were joined by a splinter group of the Democratic Nationalist Party (PND), whose leader was a Moldavian academic, A. C. Cuza. The PND was a nationwide antisemitic movement founded by historian Nicolae Iorga, and Cuza's men had always been its racist wing, called "grotesque" and "obsessive" by Veiga. Divided over this issue, but also over war-era policies, the two PND leaders were avoiding each other in 1918; Cuza, Ion Zelea Codreanu and Corneliu Șumuleanu effectively organized a PND schism by signing their adhesion to the League.

The PNL's ruin offered a chance to other anti-systemic, radically reformist, political forces. One of them was the Peasants' Party (PȚ), led by schoolteacher Ion Mihalache. Although the League and PȚ would eventually compete with one another, and divide between them the "Labor Party", they were, according to political scientist Ionuț Ciobanu, created in the same mold.

Eventually, the League adopted an anti-PNL platform promising full reforms, including universal male suffrage. The more innovative point among these was a commitment to punishing those guilty of "abuse and mistakes", a barely disguised reference to Brătianu's policies. It ran under this platform in the 1918 election, without impressing the voters. The suffrage was more of a personal triumph for Averescu, who joined the Assembly of Deputies as a progressive, watching over the government's fulfillment of reforms, and denouncing the peace agreements; he envisioned an alliance with the PNL, but asked for Brătianu to renounce the party presidency. He also submitted the League to his personal authority: in October 1918, he forced Grigore Filipescu out of the party, accusing him of factionalism. Two months later, Cuza and his men returned to the PND, but, to Iorga's irritation, continued to cooperate closely with the Averescan movement.

The Marghiloman project came to an abrupt halt in November 1918, when the Armistice with Germany spelled out a world victory for the Entente forces, and opened new prospects for the union with Transylvania. The PNL was swiftly returned to power by King Ferdinand, but the political turmoil required emergency apolitical rule, and General Artur Văitoianu took over as prime minister.

=== 1919 elections ===
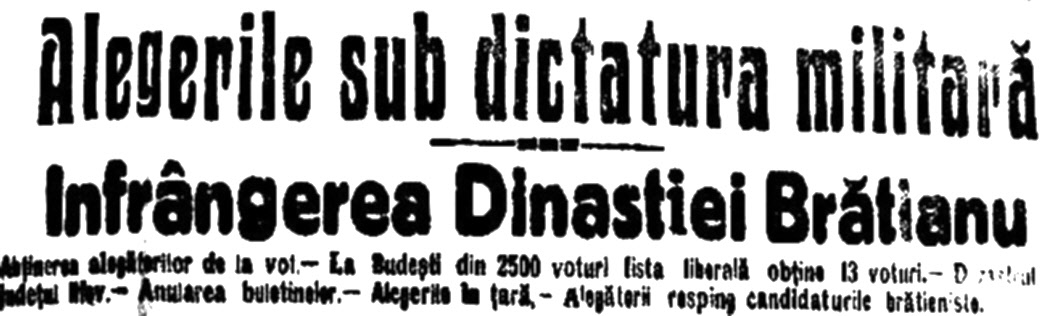
An overconfident headline of Îndreptarea, the League's main newspaper, after the election of 1919. It reads: "Elections under the Military Dictatorship. Defeat for the Brătianu Dynasty"

Văitoianu's favoritism of the PNL, and his fear of left-wing rebellion, sparked a conflict between government and the recently founded Socialist Party of Romania (PS). For a while, the anti-PNL Averescans and Conservative-Democrats (the "United Opposition") even negotiated with the PS leaders for a common boycott of the coming election. These negotiations opened the door to other common projects: Argetoianu and Văleanu were especially close to the PS' republican platform, while the general favored a crowned republic. Snubbed by the returning king and by Brătianu (though received with sympathy by Queen Marie), Averescu warned that a "revolution" was inevitable. He was bluffing, but the statements he issued managed to unnerve the PNL leadership.

In fact, early 1919 marked the official end of Romania's two-party system. The unexpected confirmation of Greater Romania had pushed Marghiloman's Conservatives, vilified for their "Germanophilia" and ridiculed for their minuscule membership, into the electoral margin. Marghiloman made one final attempt to recover the losses, relaunching the Conservative group as a "Conservative-Progressive Party". According to historian Francisco Veiga, this was a "phantasmagorical party with an impossible name", confirming the Conservatives' self-defeat rather than the PNL's restoration. Powerful Conservative sections, such as the one in Neamț County, were already defecting to Averescu's League, described by sociologist Dimitrie Drăghicescu as a magnet for Conservative "wrecks and morsels".

Averescu's group had a weak start in regular politics during the 1919 election, the first one to be carried out throughout Greater Romania, and the Romanians' first experience of universal male suffrage. Although popular, the League was undecided about whether to validate Văitoianu's handling of the vote, and only decided to boycott the election after its candidates had signed in. As a result, only some of the voters abstained, and likely winners, such as General Gheorghe Cantacuzino-Grănicerul in Vâlcea, ended up in non-eligible third places. Averescu believed that the moment to strike had not yet arrived, but, according to Marghiloman, he had missed out on a great opportunity.

In the end, only 1.2% of the Greater Romania inhabitants opted for its Assembly of Deputies candidates, when Marghiloman could still claim 3.8% of the total Parliament votes. The League's best score was in the geographical south of the Old Kingdom, a three-county area which would endure as its electoral reservoir: Ialomița, Teleorman, Vlașca. Nevertheless, although the League had never campaigned per se in the "new regions", it received an unexpected boost in Bukovina, where it placed itself ahead of the PNL.

The electorate was puzzled by the general's fence-sitting, and never again regained full confidence in his political abilities. The PȚ was most advantaged by the Averescan abstention, registering an unexpected growth throughout the enlarged country. Zamfirescu was assigned to oversee the League's campaign in Bessarabia, and, like Averescu himself, promised significant regional autonomy. The laurels were taken by the Bessarabian Peasants' Party, but the Bessarabian People's League, arriving to the Assembly as a minor Conservative ally, was soon absorbed into the Averescan movement.

The resulting government was an agrarian coalition of anti-PNL parties: the Transylvanian Romanian National Party (PNR), those Democratic Nationalists who remained loyal to Nicolae Iorga, and Mihalache's PȚ. The coalition, headed by Alexandru Vaida-Voevod, brought together symbols of "new" politics, punishing the PNL but also hostile toward Romanian conservatism. Although absent from Parliament, Averescu exercised his influence through the PNR's Octavian Goga, and, to his colleagues' amazement, obtained for himself the Internal Affairs portfolio. He resigned just days after, following a publicized row with Iorga.

=== Arrival to power ===
The coalition soon managed to upset the political establishment with its advocacy of total land reform. Inside and outside Parliament, the Averescans stood by the PNL and Conservative deputies in opposing Mihalache and Vaida-Voevod over how land should be divided. Eventually, the Vaida-Voevod cabinet was toppled by the king, with Averescu's tactical support, in March 1920.

These events propelled Averescu to the premiership. In his acceptance speech, the general outlined his mission: "to form a barrage against all attempts at leading souls astray, against all attempts to shake up, even in the least, the social and Stately institutions"; but also to "render effective the redistribution of plots among individuals". With the spread of political awareness among the peasant voters, Averescu became the center of a personality cult. The demobilized soldiers were persuaded that his organizational abilities would reflect on political life, and that he could bring order and stability to the enlarged state.

Taking its revenge on the PNR, the Averescu administration organized a clampdown against the centrifugal local governments which still existed in the newly united provinces. On April 4, 1920, Averescu shut down Bukovina's administrative apparatus, although it had been recognized by his predecessors in office, and set up a monolingual educational system. The general sought to absorb the entire PNR into his party, but PNR leader Iuliu Maniu successfully resisted his bid.

The League's own Transylvanian section grew to include nationalist intellectuals, angered by PNR regionalism: Goga, Vasile Lucaci and Octavian Tăslăuanu. Some members of the Transylvanian elite followed suit. They include an aristocrat (Anton Mocsonyi de Foeni), a Greek-Catholic community leader (Ioan Suciu), a left-leaning landowner (Petru Groza), a banker (Teodor Mihali) and an academic (Ioan Ursu). Farther to the west, in the Romanian Banat, Averescu enlisted support from regional organizer Avram Imbroane and his National Union.

The Averescans were in a position to attract additional votes from the other "new regions". Since the Paris Conference had recognized Romania's right of territorial extension under Averescu's mandate, and since the government introduced the first stages of land reform, his party registered a significant rise in popularity, especially among Bessarabian Romanian community (to which Averescu belonged by virtue of birth). The Bessarabian chapter, overseen by Old Kingdom immigrant, poet Dumitru Iov, had among its native politicians Teodor Neaga, Vladimir Bodescu and Vladimir Chiorescu. They mounted a nationalist campaign against the Bessarabian Peasants' Party, who had sought to preserve regional autonomy. The League attracted into its ranks several Bessarabian cadres, including Vladimir Cristi, woman activist Elena Alistar, and, with his entire Bessarabian Peasants' Party dissidence, Sergiu Niță.

At the height of its anti-autonomy campaign, the Averescu party turned on the ethnic minorities. The general created controversy by stressing that the political parties representing minority groups needed to be dissolved. Despite such rhetoric, the Averescans pursued a policy of practical alliances with the ethnic minority political clubs, against the centralizing and nationalist forces (PNL and the Democratic Union Party). In Dobruja, they courted ethnic Bulgarians, who had not formed their own political party. Dimo Dimitriev and a handful of conservative Bulgarians answered the call. In Transylvania, the League had a Jewish Romanian candidate, Henric Streitman. Running on an assimilationist platform, he failed to convince any of Transylvania's Jewish voters.

Such ambiguities were especially noticeable in Bukovina. The region's PȚ section, headed by Dorimedont "Dori" Popovici, defected to the League on March 22, 1920. It joined up with an ethnically "purified" Averescan chapter, presided upon by sociologist Traian Brăileanu. A third figure in that alliance was a pro-autonomy Bukovinian German, Alfred Kohlruss.

=== Consolidation and anticommunism ===
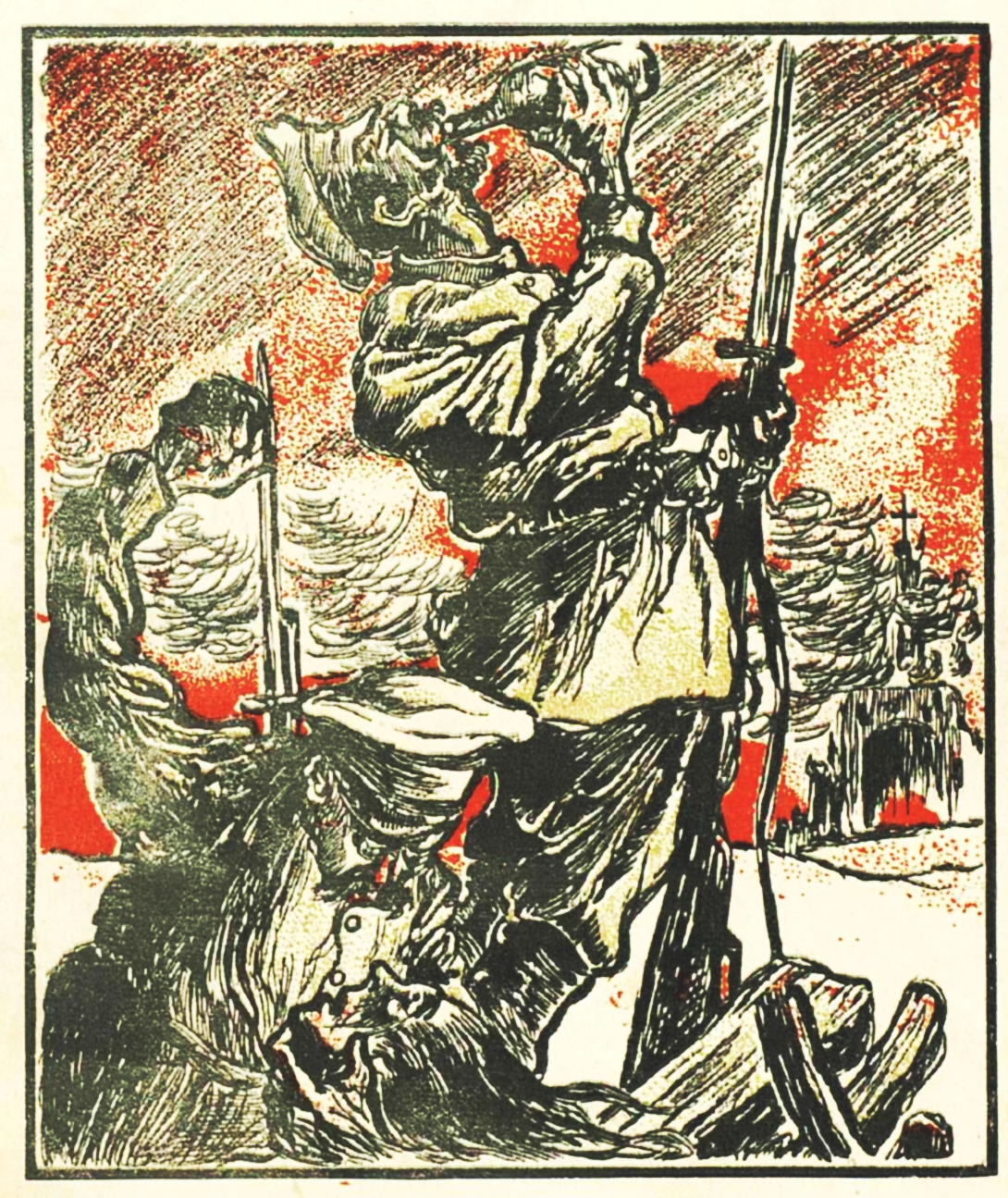
The two faces of 1920 in Romania: "The Russian Bane", as depicted in a right-wing pamphlet...

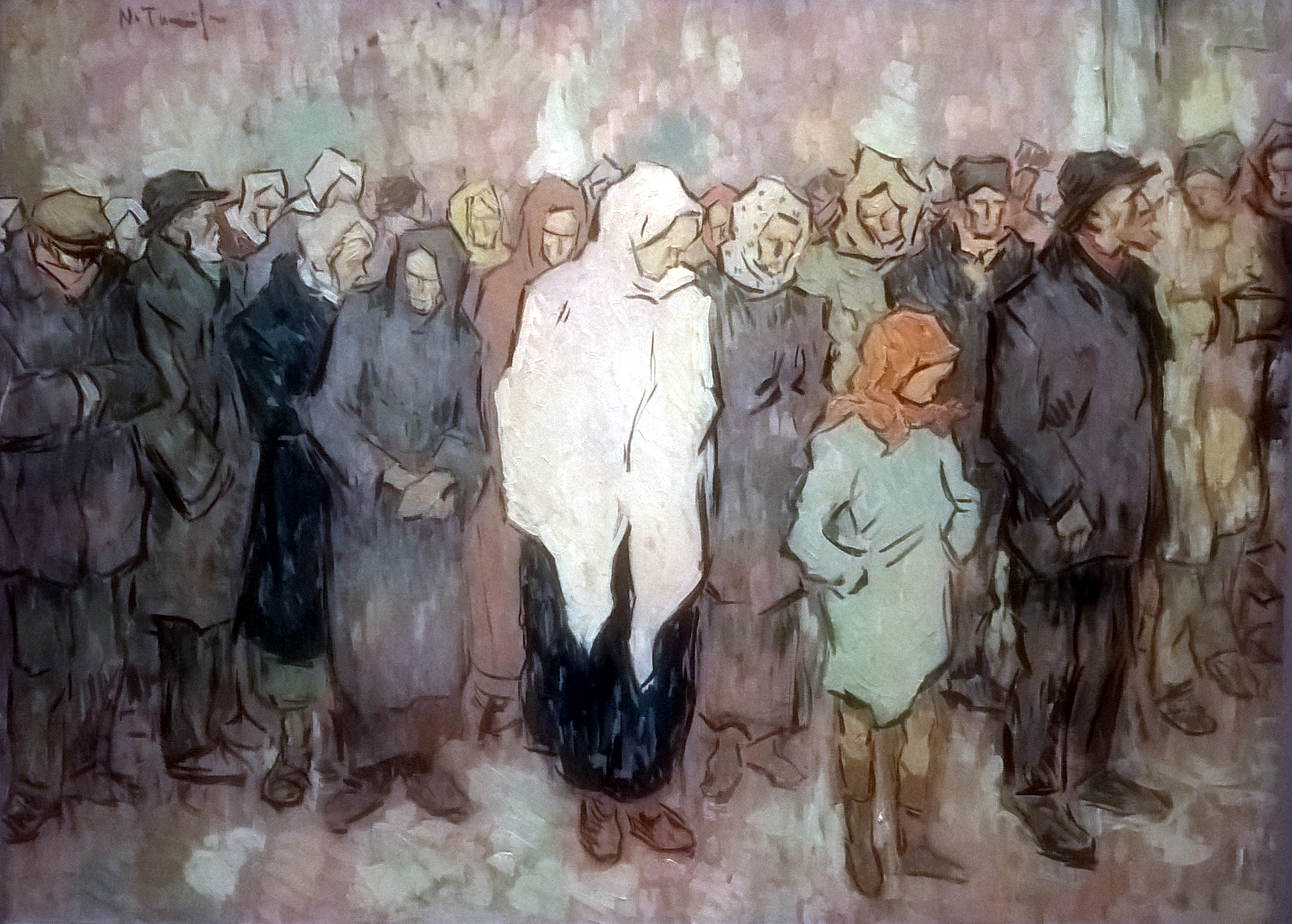
... and Queuing for Bread, by the left-leaning artist Nicolae Tonitza.

The League's magnetism meant that Averescan sections functioned everywhere in the country. Averescu, Flondor, Goga, Imbroane, Niță and Dori Popovici held congress on April 16, 1920, when the League was officially declared a "People's Party", the first political group to register members everywhere in Greater Romania. In the Old Kingdom, the PP still relied on the influence of military men, including General Constantin Coandă and Major Ștefan Tătărescu, and, after another PND schism, absorbed into its ranks the Cuza–Codreanu–Șumuleanu faction. Also in the Old Kingdom, a section of the PP soon broke off, organizing itself as the "People's Party Dissidents".

The spring 1920 election was a comfortable victory for the PP. It received 42% of the national vote for the Assembly, and 44.6% of the total. This was the first appearance of an electoral phenomenon known as "government dowry", meaning that the party in government by the time of the election could expect to win it. Moreover, the Premier pioneered the use of state channels for the distribution of party propaganda, and his prefects acted as arbiters in the county-level electoral battles. The national score was still unusually low for a Romanian party in government, and Averescu still found it very hard to stabilize his popularity.

Like his PNL competitors and the king himself, Averescu was preoccupied with the menace of Bolshevism, and suspicious of the Socialist Party's radicalization. His anticommunism was voiced in Parliament by PP member D. R. Ioanițescu, who spoke for the entire parliamentary right. In contrast, another PP deputy, the Bessarabian journalist and former anarchist Zamfir Arbore, was noted for his sympathy toward Red Russia.

The situation became explosive in October 1920, when the socialists attempted a general strike, and the PP organized the clampdown. The government prolonged and generalized military censorship, and legislated that all conflicts between employers and workers to pass through labor courts (the "Trancu-Iași Law"). The next year, a part of Bessarabia, perceived as especially vulnerable to Bolshevik penetration, was placed under martial law.

Averescu's handling of the situation, fully supported by the PNL, had its share of brutality. According to PS militants, his was a "class government", "terrified" by trade union growth, or even a "White Terror" regime. The PP, and especially Cuza's extremists, enjoyed support from a number of small paramilitary groups, including the Moldavian Guard of National Awareness. Headed by Constantin Pancu, it intimidated the PS sections and began organizing nationalist trade unions.

The government expelled or relocated population groups perceived as disloyal, ordering a mass arrest of the PS splinter group, an embryonic Communist Party. Averescu's subordinates also staged the unusually harsh trial of communist Mihail Gheorghiu Bujor, and stood accused of murdering PS militant Herșcu Aroneanu. Their actions were hotly debated by the mainstream opposition, not least of all because they risked destroying all chances of peace between Romania and Russia.

In tandem, the Averescans extended a hand to the PS moderates, who were less likely to be influenced by the Bolshevik ideology. As Veiga writes, Averescu's Romania was uniquely positioned in respect to leftist uprisings: the Romanian left as a whole was "very weak", and the country "traversed the great revolutionary wave without any sort of practical consequences." For their part, many opposition deputies believed that Romanian communists needed to be scolded, not stamped out. There was just one notable act of retribution: on December 9, 1920, Max Goldstein exploded a bomb inside Parliament, killing the Conservative Party's Dimitrie Greceanu, and injuring several others (including Argetoianu). The PS later denounced Goldstein as a profiteer and a renegade.

=== Toppling ===
From the right, the PP was attacked by the PNL, who withdrew from Parliament in February 1921, prompting Averescu to renounce promises of moderation. In his public addresses, the general invoked his "responsibilities" of reforming the country. Bidding for left-wing votes, the government drafted the much awaited land reform at its own convenience. Its law on land redistribution, not essentially different from the Peasantist project of 1920, was conceived by a defecting PND parliamentarian, Vasile Kogălniceanu, who had been Averescu's adversary during the 1907 Revolt. The PP was also pushing for an administrative reform that would increase the citizens' say in local government. It sought to legislate a measure of women's suffrage, but this proposal was soundly defeated in Parliament.

The Averescan ministers were unable to tackle the severe economic recession, and Averescu even offered to renounce his premiership in favor of Take Ionescu. Ionescu refused, and the cabinet was locked in place until late 1921. Revisiting his stance, Averescu informed his supporters that he could only accept a PNL succession. The arrival to power of any other party would have threatened the PP's main project, of monopolizing the anti-PNL vote.

In July 1921, the "Reșița Affair", sparked when Argetoianu told his parliamentary critics to "kiss my ass", offered an unexpected chance of affirmation to the PNL opposition. At that junction, Ionescu withdrew his support and became friendly toward the PNL, leading to the government's resignation. Between December 1921 and January 1922, Ionescu was Prime Minister of a minority cabinet. It also fell when the PP managed to pass its motion of no confidence, but was swiftly replaced by a PNL administration. Brătianu became Premier and Văitoianu headed Internal Affairs.

The PNL made a victorious comeback in the March 1922 election. Its campaign focused on instigating hostility toward Averescu, but Brătianu's prefects also lifted censorship and allowed all parties to campaign freely. The PP, neutral toward all other anti-PNL forces, attempted to form an alliance with the Marghiloman Conservatives, while Ionescu's faction went to the PND. The Averescans dropped to 7.6% of the vote in the Assembly and 6.5% overall, although theirs was still the most important single opposition force. The PP's downfall was glaring in Bessarabia, where it failed to win any parliamentary seats. In Bukovina, the Averescan party was joined by one segment of the Jewish community, under Mayer Ebner, but was still defeated at the ballot box.

=== "Orderly opposition" ===
By 1922, as a result of the Versailles and Trianon treaties, the borders of "Greater Romania" had been secured, and the country, with its growing economy, officially went from 7.5 to 16.5 million inhabitants, which also seemed to compensate for her demographic losses. The PNL leadership saw the electoral success as a confirmation of its pivotal role in Romanian society, and, despite protests from the right and the left, resumed its paternalistic approach to politics.

In this uneasy climate, the PNL finally passed the 1923 Constitution, thereafter criticized as the beginning of a PNL-ist guided democracy. As Florescu notes, "Brătianu was not inclined to renounce, even for a short while, his conductor's baton. [...] Because of this, the modernization of Romanian political life was subordinated to Ion I.C. Brătianu and the liberals, which proved to be a decisive obstacle in the natural evolution of political life, in its adjustment to the new epoch." When the PNR-led opposition suggested a political boycott, Averescu sided with the PNL, announcing that his men were the "orderly opposition".

In addition to the Constitution, the PNL finally agreed to emancipate Romania's Jewish minority. In March 1923, Cuza parted with the PP and set up his own National-Christian Defense League (LANC). This far-right group, later joined by PP right-wingers Ion Zelea Codreanu, Șumuleanu and Brăileanu, was dedicated to antisemitic violence, popularizing the Protocols of the Elders of Zion canard, and welcoming into its ranks the fascist youth. Cuza still held Averescu's ideas of moral order as a source of inspiration, and the LANC tried to draw traditional PP voters into antisemitism.

In their various statements, Averescu and Goga were still friendly toward Cuza, playing down LANC violence, and giving exposure to fascist propaganda. However, at the other end, Argetoianu and many of the former Conservative-Democrats left the PP and sided with the PNR, a magnet of new conservatism. Other figures of prewar conservatism made the opposite move: philosopher Constantin Rădulescu-Motru, diplomat Ion Mitilineu, educationist Constantin Meissner, journalist Andrei Corteanu, social activist Dem. I. Dobrescu, and civil administrator Ion Georgescu Obrocea all signed up with the PP around 1922. The Averescans still negotiated with the PNR and other Transylvanian parties, but only managed to form an alliance with the minority Magyar Party, personally negotiated by Goga.

The street battles, but moreover the Transylvanian and Bukovinian objections to its centralizing policies, again left the PNL in an uncomfortable situation. On June 3, 1924, the Averescans staged a "triumph of democracy" march in Bucharest, threatening with a coup, and demanding that Averescu be granted the premiership. In the subsequent mayoral elections, Brătianu's administration effectively censored PP propaganda.

=== 1926 return to power ===
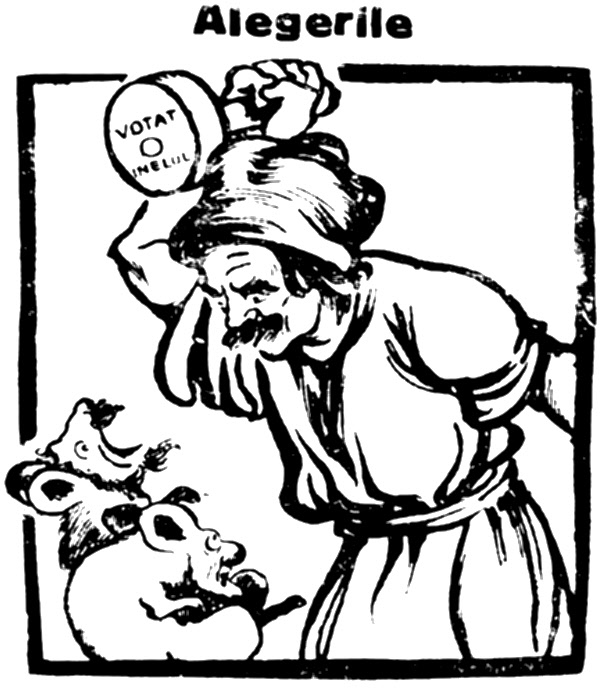
A Peasantist cartoon of 1926, portraying Averescu and Ion I. C. Brătianu as vermin. The peasant voter is encouraged to stamp them out at the ballot box

The PP and the PNR agreed to form a "united front" against government, but Averescu made it clear that he had not lost his appetite for negotiating with Brătianu. The National Liberal tacticians eventually pushed Averescu to the forefront, allowing him to take over as Prime Minister (March 1926), but in fact maneuvering in his shadow. The Averescans were welcomed into the National Liberal high finance, with Averescu himself being appointed on the board of Creditul Minier society.

The PP government ordered for the new elections to be carried out under a single electoral law, equally valid in the Old Kingdom and the "new regions". More controversially, the cooperation between the PNL and the PP legalized the "government dowry" in an amendment to proportional representation, ensuring the majority of parliamentary seats to any party that could absorb at least 40% of the popular vote, and obliging all registered parties to open regional sections anywhere in the country. The subsequent electoral campaign became a showdown: the PP, PNL and Peasantists each absorbed a number of smaller parties, centralizing the national vote. The PP also formalized its cartel with the Magyar Party.

The 1926 election was an absolute peak for the PP, which received 52% of the total vote. In Râmnicu Sărat County, the Averescan candidate managed an outstanding 96.6%. However, the PP's electioneering was noted for its numerous and unsanctioned abuses, including the use of state funds for People's Party propaganda and the intimidation of opposition candidates (particularity those running for the PȚ and the Bessarabian Peasantists). As the caretaker of Internal Affairs, Goga was a prime suspect.

Under such circumstances, the PP benefited from a fresh influx of cadres, many of whom were literati. Among those elected into Parliament as PP men was former Prahova Conservative, the award-winning writer I. A. Bassarabescu. Novelist Mihail Sadoveanu was elected in Bihor County, Transylvania, but, together with poet George Topîrceanu, represented a new generation of Moldavian PP cadres. Also active in PP politics, poet Mateiu Caragiale tried but failed to receive a party nomination.

The Bukovinian caucus co-opted Antin Lukasevych and Iurii Lysan of the Ukrainian Social Democrats, who also won parliamentary seats, while the partnership with individual Jewish and German politicians was again revived. Ebner, Streitman, Kohlruss and Karl Klüger in Bukovina, and Yehuda Leib Tsirelson in Bessarabia, were elected on the Averescan ticket.

Ballot rigging only strengthened the opposition in the long run. Viewing the PP and the PNL as one political machine, the other parties again coalesced into a single bloc. In October 1926, the PNR and PȚ created the most stable avatar of "new" politics, the National Peasants' Party (PNȚ). It grouped together "Green International" agrarians and classical liberals, social conservatives and socialists, driven into a revolutionary mood. After a while, the Peasantist sections were pushed into moderate positions, which allowed the PNȚ to absorb Iorga's old PND (known then as "People's Nationalist Party").

Still, the PNȚ lost some of its more conservative Transylvanian leaders, who became PP leaders: Vasile Goldiș, Ion Lapedatu, Ioan Lupaș, Ion Agârbiceanu. Joining them were old PCD cadres who had parted with the general in 1918, including rival G. Filipescu. At the other end, the PP remained suspicious of left-wingers. Returning to its anticommunist agenda, it staged a repression against Lupta and other leftist newspapers.

With new backing, Averescu attempted to break out of the unequal partnership with the PNL, implying that it was an "unhealthy" solution. Mihail Manoilescu, his Minister of the Economy, adopted radical fiscal policies for the redistribution of wealth, and undermined the PNL's big finance with calls for cooperative banking. At a time, a movement directed by the PP's own Teodor Neaga sought to bring back the old Bessarabian zemstvos; Averescu welcomed it with speeches about decentralization, describing zemstvos as a compromise between centralism and regional autonomy. Moreover, the PP strayed from the traditional course of Romania's European policies, by obtaining a recognition of the Bessarabian union from the (nominally hostile) Kingdom of Italy, and turning Romania away from her Little Entente alliance.

=== Downfall and intrigues ===
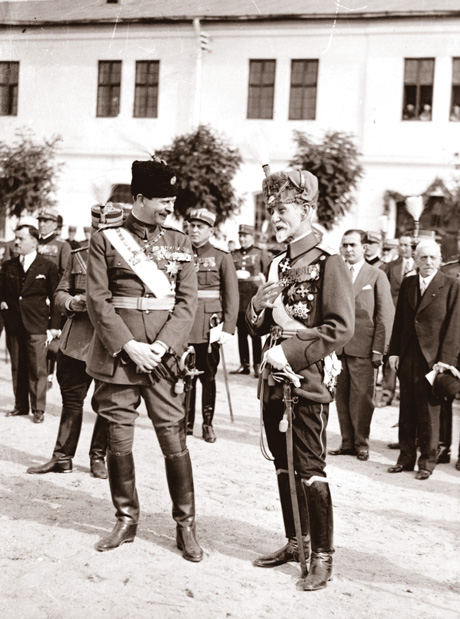
Averescu and Carol II, the rival policymakers, attending a parade in August 1930. Snapshot by Iosif Berman

Eventually, in June 1927, the king ordered Averescu to step down. According to some reports, the deposed prime minister was outraged enough to threaten with a coup, but was quickly neutralized by the PNL. PP optimism was motivated by its victories in two partial elections, but the National Liberals focused their energies on sabotaging the Averescan candidates. Internecine disputes also undermined the PP: Lapedatu versus Manoilescu and Constantin Garoflid; Negulescu versus Petrovici.

Just as the PP was announcing a new political offensive, the entire Bukovina chapter defected. The party was in disarray, losing most of its support base in the Old Kingdom—except for Dobruja, where, in the 1927 race, it received 5.75% regionally, compared to 1.93% nationally. In Bessarabia, it relied on 3.3% of the vote and lost Neaga's backing. In Transylvania, the Magyar Party unsealed its pact with Averescu, prompting the latter to turn more nationalistic. From ca. 1930, the Averescan program included demands for racial quotas, so as to undermine the Hungarians' political and cultural representation.

The PP's decline was less evident in the 1928 election, carried out under a triumphant National Peasantist cabinet, which did not touch the electoral legislation. The PP formed a cartel with its former rivals, the PND. They managed 2.48% nationally.

The successive deaths of Brătianu and King Ferdinand announced a major political reshuffling. PP theoretician Manoilescu sensed this, and left the party to make his debut as a corporatist doctrinaire. A conspiracy, facilitated by the PNȚ government and by former PP men (Argetoianu, Manoilescu), granted the throne to Ferdinand's disgraced son, Prince Carol, who would reign as Carol II. Averescu spoke out against the PNȚ tactics, staging a (futile) parliamentary walkout in 1929, but his party voted overwhelmingly in favor of Carol's reinstatement. By then, most of the PP elite cadres, from Garoflid to Petrovici and Filipescu, were following Manoilescu's example and resigning from the party.

From 1930, again citing the fear of social revolution, Averescu also began courting King Carol. As a reward, he was made Marshal of Romania and considered for Carol's own ministerial "reserve team". That promise failed to materialize: the king was more impressed by Iorga's loyalty, and, to Averescu's chagrin, set up a PND cabinet. In the 1931 election, the Averescan candidates received a minor boost, reemerging with 4.82% of the Assembly vote. However, the PP had lost all footing in Romania's "new regions", where it had always been a minor presence. In Transylvanian counties, it received more than 10% of the vote only in Năsăud and Făgăraș.

=== PNA split and "Georgist" alliance ===
The fascist and corporatist models became even more fashionable as the Great Depression set in. Half of the PP broke off in 1932, setting up the National Agrarian Party (PNA), with Octavian Goga as its president. This split was allegedly prompted by the king: Goga fully supported his dictatorial projects, while Averescu was still ambivalent. The PNA became more like the LANC, quoting fascist principles, and favoring strong antisemitic measures. Goga made history in 1933, when he openly demanded the creation of special concentration camps for sorting out Romanian Jews.

Fascism was more successfully represented by the former LANC paramilitary wing, the Iron Guard, which Averescu denounced as an "anarchic" movement. The Guard made steady electoral gains throughout the more disputed electoral circumscriptions, appealing to the social groups most affected by the economic crisis. As Veiga notes, the Guard was also able to collect the PP's upper-class voters, including Cantacuzino-Grănicerul.

The PNA defection was a debilitating coup against the Averescans, who lost not just Goga, but also Ghibu, Agârbiceanu, and several high-ranking cadres (Silviu Dragomir, Stan Ghițescu, Constantin Iancovescu). Out of 76 PP chapters, 24 opted to join Goga. In the July 1932 election, the PP only appealed to some 2.16% of the Romanian electorate; this was less than what Goga had received—together, the two parties accounted almost exactly for the PP's electoral base in the 1931 election. The PP was again able to benefit from the customary allocation of seats (called "downright absurd" by analyst Marcel Ivan): in Transylvania, where it obtained less than 2%, Averescu's men still received two Assembly seats, whereas the PNL, with 8% of the regional vote, only managed one seat.

PP men witnessed the PNȚ's return to power on an anti-Carlist platform, and, although numerically irrelevant, announced that they were preparing their own comeback. Despite arousing public indignation, the PP began negotiating with both Carol and the Iron Guard, probably hoping to play one against the other. Averescu's optimism was stoked by the government crisis of 1932, when Carol's dictatorial project clashed badly with the PNȚ's commitment to democratic action. The Marshal's stated objective was to tear down "the barrier that exists between the People's Party and the Sovereign".

The elections of 1933 were called by a new PNL cabinet, headed by Ion G. Duca. The PP mobilized itself, forming a tiny cartel with Filipescu's Conservative revivalists and the right-wing "Georgist" Liberals. It was also joined by Nicolae Rădescu, an anti-Carlist officer. He was involved with an Averescan veterans' association, Cultul Patriei ("Cult of the Motherland"). The Averescans were again interested in the German votes, and attempted to set up a satellite German Farmers' Union in Transylvania. The PP's Constitutional-and-Conservative list registered a dismal result, of less than 2% nationally.

Seeing the Iron Guard and other growing parties as direct threats to the political system, Premier Duca reestablished censorship and repressive mechanisms, even before the actual voting. The Guard assassinated him that December. Its leadership was promptly jailed, the Guard was publicly defended by Averescu. It also found itself courted by King Carol, who had come to resent PNL politics. In that context, the ambitious monarch planned to create a puppet government, headed by Averescu, managed by Argetoianu, and supported by the Iron Guard. His attempt failed, returning the PP into obscurity. Instead, Carol was able to form an obedient cabinet from the PNL youth of Gheorghe Tătărescu, with Manoilescu as adviser.

=== Demise ===
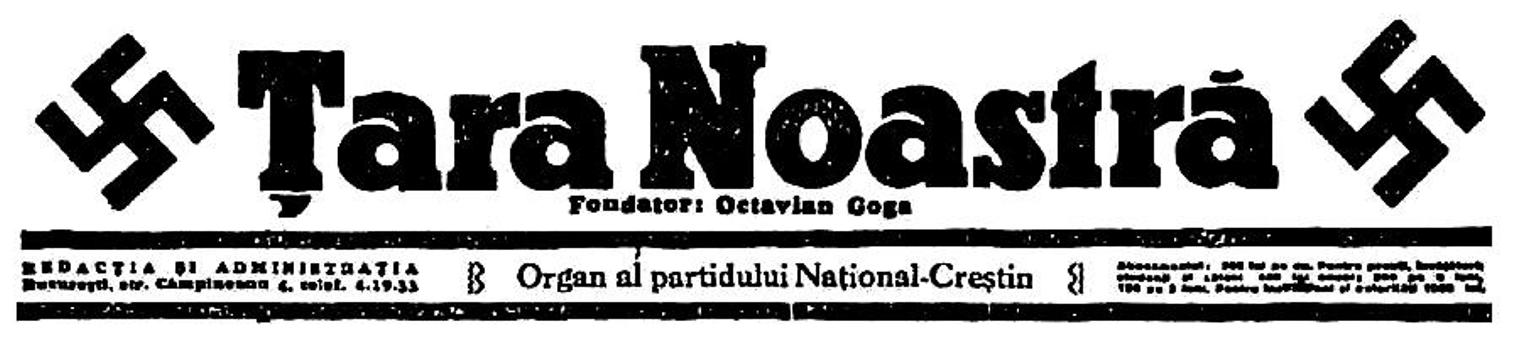
Octavian Goga's Țara Noastră newspaper, displaying the National Christian Party's swastika logo (1935)

In July 1935, the PP's fascist breakaway groups, PNA and LANC, merged to form the National Christian Party (PNC), a direct competitor of the Iron Guard. As far as traditional Averescans were concerned, the new party was nothing more than "agitatorial". The PP and the "Georgists", meanwhile, were closer than ever. In September 1935, they formed a Constitutional Front, soon joined by the para-fascist Crusade of Romanianism and by Carol's outstandingly vocal critic, Grigore Forțu, who led a marginal Citizens' Bloc of National Salvation.

In March 1937, attempting to deescalate the crisis, Tătărescu banned all political uniforms, primarily targeting the Guard and the PNC, but also outlawing the PP's yellow shirts and cockades. The election of 1937 created two conjectural camps: the National Peasantists sealed a non-aggression pact with the Iron Guard, aiming to restrict Carol's intervention in party politics; Tătărescu's National Liberals managed to obtain conditional support from both the PP and the PNC, forming a loose alliance of Carlist interest groups. Averescu was isolated on the political scene. The "Georgists" dissolved the Constitutional Front and crossed the floor, sealing pacts with the Guard and the PNȚ. In response, the PP made vague efforts to form another cartel, with either the PNL or the PNC.

Even with the application of 1926 laws, the election result was a deadlock. Since no party totaled 40%, it became impossible to form government. For Carol II, this was an opportunity. Using his prerogative, the monarch handed power to the PNC minority (9.15% of the votes), which had promised to enact his dictatorial and corporatist program. Goga initiated discussions with the Averescans, trying to talk them into a fusion, but the two sides could not agree on how to share mandates between them.

The PNC's partnership with the king broke down when Goga also began negotiating with the Guard, leading Carol to test a new political solution. In February 1938, the PNC administration was deposed. All the parties were officially banned and replaced with the National Renaissance Front, with high offices reserved for old-regime politicians, Averescu included. In early March 1938, the Marshal officially resigned from the PP, and the party presidency was assigned by default to Negulescu. The PP's dissolution was perhaps voluntary, and in any case welcomed by several of Averescu's former colleagues. Others, however, were taken by surprise: as a distraught Trancu-Iași noted, the PP simply "fizzled out", without any official acceptance from its elected corps.

After he agreed to this final compromise with King Carol, Averescu largely withdrew from public life. He maintained only some informal contacts with former PP dignitaries, such as Argetoianu, Meissner, Trancu-Iași and Petre Papacostea. He bemoaned the passing of Romania's repressive constitution, and refused to countersign it, but he also rejected offers to join up with a public show of protest by the PNȚ and PNL. Just as some advanced proposals to restore Averescu to the premiership, the ailing Marshal went on an extended trip abroad. He died of heart disease shortly after returning to Romania, and was granted a state funeral.

== Ideological synthesis ==
=== Class collaboration vs. meritocracy ===
Averescu's politics were part of a European-wide reorientation, a pragmatic conservative answer to the postwar leftist riots, but also a manifestation of the soldiers' particular resentment toward classical liberal democracy. As a military opponent of the civilian elite, looking for a way out of the two-party system, Averescu was compared (by both contemporaries and historians) to General Boulanger and Mustafa Kemal. Veiga also suggests that Averescu was a local "Primo de Rivera", and that his demobilized supporters were Romania's "khaki rioters".

According to Gheorghe I. Florescu, the general was forcefully propelled into politics by his soldiers' ambitions: "With the glowing aura of an ever-increasing, tide-like, popularity, General Averescu found himself riding the wave of innovation, but also of danger, given that there was no clear direction to its menacing advance, to its mysterious and incomprehensible character." Also according to Florescu: "In 1920–1921, Romanian political life traversed a very complex interval [...] evolving from obsolete conservative tendencies to an increased radicalism, aiming to keep in tune with the new age. The People's Party itself, having first presented itself as the purveyor of democratic principles, fell back on conservatism during its two-year interval in government." In his own words, the general was "a prudent liberal" ushering in the "rule of law".

The PP's anti-systemic bias was universally perceived as incoherent, demagogic, even self-contradictory, a textbook example of "non-ideological" populism. In 1918, Argetoianu explained that the League was indeed a political party, but a pluralistic one, playing host to several "strong currents of the masses." Witnessing the Averescan phenomenon from the side, Nicolae Iorga argued that the PP was even flimsier than that: "the [PP's] program was Averescu, the guarantee that it would be effected was Averescu, the party prestige was Averescu, the fight for an ideal was Averescu. Everything led back to Averescu." The establishment regarded Averescu as entirely unfit for his political duties, a "fascinating" but "permanently indecisive" character. Others simply believed that Averescu was incompetent. The PNȚ's Ioan Hudiță claimed to see right through Averescu's charisma, to his "spineless" and "servile" core. Drăghicescu also writes that the Averescan myth appealed to "the turncoats, disguised as they may be into new men, virginal men."

From inception, the People's League courted both the self-reliant middle class and the disenfranchised, crediting itself as a class collaboration party. Its propaganda declared it "a protector of The Artisans, of The Villagers, and of all the maligned people", fueled "not by bonds of interest, but by the overwhelming love of the peasants and the soldiers." Some party members tried to connect this inter-class positioning with a more concrete political terminology. Before his defection to corporatism, Manoilescu depicted the PP, with its tax reform policies and labor courts, as a prime example of "neoliberal doctrine" (that is to say, social liberalism). For a short while, the PP counted among its intellectual elite the other voice of youthful liberalism: Manoilescu's rival, Ștefan Zeletin.

In Manoilescu's definition, the Averescu program did not rely "on any single social class, but on all of them", mixing "quite sentimental liberalism" into "quite timid socialism." Meanwhile, through Goga's inner faction, the PP was tied to various political social experiments promoted by the intelligentsia. Vasile Goldiș and Ioan Lupaș, for instance, directed government funds into eugenic research (1927). Goga's own rapid ascent embodied the political aspirations of his fellow writers, who believed in an intellectual meritocracy: Mihail Sadoveanu motivated his decision to join the PP as a need to strengthen the intellectuals' direct presence in politics; from the outside, Camil Petrescu pressured Goga (unsuccessfully so) to legislate the "dictatorship of intellectual labor".

=== Para-fascism vs. anti-fascism ===
Despite its pragmatic trans-ethnic alliances and its multiculturalism, the PP maintained political links with the far right, most notably through Cuza's followers. As a minor partner during the 1920 strike, the National Awareness Guard, which had among its junior members the future Iron Guard organizer Corneliu Zelea Codreanu, seems to have been inspired by both the Austrian Christian Social Party and the German Nazi Party. The National Awareness Guard was called a "fascist organization" by historian Lucian Butaru, and was fondly remembered by Codreanu for its antisemitic doctrines. Other extremist clubs on the right were courted by the PP over the remainder of its existence: as historian of fascism Stanley G. Payne notes, the post-1920 PP was "an ever-diminishing, increasingly right-wing organization." The national syndicalist doctrinaire Nae Ionescu saw the Averescan League as a "federalist" group resembling the "syndicalist ethos", but noted with regret that it had evolved into a more rigid and "abstracting" structure. From the left, the PP was perceived as duplicitous when it came to fascist rioting. An angry Jewish commentator, Isac Ludo, accused his coreligionists of naivete, since their endorsement of the PP did not prevent Averescu from tolerating antisemitic hooliganism, nor Goga from stoking it.

The PP was also noted for its privileged relationship with Italian fascism, its own hopes of success rekindled by the March on Rome. Although inspired by and advantageous to the PNL, the 1926 electoral legislation was supposedly modeled on the Italian "Acerbo Law". Moreover, in a 1930s project, Averescu, Iorga, Manoilescu and Goga were all considered as overseers of the Action Committees for the Universality of Rome, that is to say the Italian bureau of the Fascist International.

The fascist connections were explicitly contradicted by the public attitudes of some PP leaders. Historian H. James Burgwyn writes that Averescu may have indeed been perceived as "a Fascist sympathizer", but actually "had no interest in the Duce as an ideological mentor". While fascism was taking its first steps in Romania, this "most serious candidate for the role of dictator" was earning high praise for preserving "the middle line". After the Goga defection, Averescu issued several disclaimers against suspicions that the PP was secretly fascist. Later on, Averescu also distanced himself from Carol II's authoritarian projects, but (as Butaru writes) this mainly showed that he was not one of the king's favorites.

Some other PP members were ever more vocal in rejecting fascism. People's League ideologist P. P. Negulescu, who deplored Averescu's attack on socialism, endures in Romanian political history as a supporter of moderation. He wrote an outspoken critique of racist discourse, denouncing Romanian fascism as a tool for German spies, and actively supported ethnic pluralism. The PP's conservative core repeatedly censured Averescu's tactical alliances with fascist politicians, including in 1935, when the PP was allied by proxy with the Crusade of Romanianism.

Many revolutionaries on the right were exasperated, their press calling Averescu a leader of an "old men's insurrection". After converting to authoritarianism, Manoilescu expressed his frustration that Negulescu and other "intellectual politicians" had prevented Averescu from fulfilling his historical mission. Manoilescu also contended that, owing to such affiliations, the PP could never appeal to the mainstay voters of either fascism or communism: the educated youth. This verdict is consistent with statistical data. In 1938, the PP had 14 university professors as registered members, including Negulescu, Ilie Bărbulescu and N. I. Herescu; the Iron Guard meanwhile only had 8.

== Symbols and institutions ==
The Averescan party's preference for the color yellow was official until 1937, after which it became informal. It was notably used in floral arrangements at official functions. Unlike the other parties, which frequently changed symbols, the PP was committed to using the "six-pointed star, filled", as its electoral logo. First appearing in 1918 as the League's badge, the star was said to represent Averescu's political newness and for the hopes invested in him. References to the party symbol featured prominently in propaganda rhymes. These called the PNL elite "rats", and the star itself "the rats' scourge". In 1926, however, the PP switched to a "broken" trigram (☷), used for identification in the election bulletins.

The party slogan was Muncă, cinste, legalitate ("Labor, honesty, legality"), which in itself alluded to the meeting of workers' rights, social liberalism, and "evolved" conservatism. The phrase became known (and ridiculed) as "the general's primer", and as a timid alternative to the PNL's Prin noi înșine ("By ourselves"). As much as it diversified it support base, the PP always used personalized politics as an asset. According to historian Svetlana Suveică, its electoral manifestos for 1926 "focused entirely on Averescu's merits, their content hardly ever mentioned the name of the party headed by the general."

The PP's central tribune was Îndreptarea, whose editors included Constantin Gongopol and (in 1923) Ștefan Tătărescu. The PP also controlled many regional newspapers. In early 1919, it won official support from two provincial weeklies: Adevăr și Dreptate, put out in Galați by Sebastian S. Eustatziu, and George Lungulescu's Alarma Mehedințiului, of Turnu Severin. In the Bessarabian center of Chișinău, the PP was represented by Vasile Cijevschi's Nashe Slovo and, later, by Dumitru Iov's Cuvântul Nou. At Timișoara, the PP press was mainly represented by Petru Nemoianu's Gazeta Banatului.

Many other such tribunes existed, during the PP's heyday, in: Baia Mare (Renașterea), Bârlad (Apărarea Națională, Steagul Biruinței, Tribuna Tutovei), Bazargic (Deliormanul, Dobrogea Nouă, Înfrățirea, Ecoul Caliacrei, Steaua Caliacrei), Brăila (Îndreptarea Brăilei), Bucharest (Banatul, Cinstea, Muncitorul, Olteanul, Realitatea), Buzău (Drapelul, Steaua Poporului), Cahul (Cahulul), Cernăuți (Dreptatea, Țărănimea), Cluj (România), Constanța (Refacerea, Steaua), Craiova (Cuvântul Olteniei, Doljul, Ordinea), Dorohoi (Biruința, Steaua Poporului), Iași (Liga Poporului), Râmnicu Vâlcea (Glasul Poporului, Steaua), Roman (Opinca Română), Slatina (Gazeta Oltului, Liga Oltului), Soroca (Basarabia de Sus), Târgu Jiu (Gazeta Poporului din Gorj) etc.

During their alliance with Iorga's party, the Averescans inherited former PND-ist gazettes, starting with Iorga's own Neamul Românesc and Traian Brăileanu's Poporul of Cernăuți. Others were Coasa of Constanța, Brazda Nouă of Bârlad, Cuvântul Naționalist of Bacău, Îndemnul of Pitești, Răvașul Nostru of Suceava, Vremea Nouă and Vremea Ordinei of Craiova, Biruința of Turnu Severin etc. By the early 1930s, the PP's official press included Îndreptarea, Cuvântul Olteniei, and the newer Constituția of Râmnicu Sărat. Îndreptarea survived the PP's official disestablishment, and was in print until summer 1938.

== Legacy ==
The PP's agony and disestablishment preceded the end of Greater Romania and the shock of World War II (see Romania in World War II). In 1940, after ceding Bessarabia to the Soviets and Northern Transylvania to the Hungarian Regency, Carol II was pushed into exile, and the Iron Guard took over. This bloody interregnum, known as National Legionary State, was ended from within by Ion Antonescu, the appointed Conducător. Antonescu's Romania was also aligned with international fascism, and joined Nazi Germany in carrying out Operation Barbarossa.

In late August 1944, with the turn of tides, the King Michael Coup finally deposed Antonescu and broke off Romania's alliance with the Axis powers. It was the unwitting start of communization. Once a minor group persecuted by PP governments, the Romanian Communist Party swelled up in numbers and, with Soviet assistance, advanced steadily toward imposing a Romanian People's Republic. The process required support from some key members of the old political class, most notoriously so from two former PP dignitaries, Petru Groza and Mihail Sadoveanu, who held some of the top positions in the new state. In this context, Groza took over as Prime Minister of a communist-dominated cabinet, after ousting the former PP man Nicolae Rădescu; Rădescu fled the country to escape imprisonment.

Other PP cadres, particularly those who had fraternized with fascism, were also prosecuted. The more notorious such cases are those of Argetoianu, Manoilescu, Petrovici, Lapedatu and Brăileanu. Agârbiceanu's position was more unusual. He and his literary work were well regarded by the communists, but still he would not relinquish his priesthood in the outlawed Catholic Church.

Meanwhile, communist propaganda made deliberate efforts to minimize the PP's role in political history. It cautioned that the Averescans were "the bourgeoisie and the landowners", not the people, and noted that they spearheaded "reactionary" persecutions. This verdict was nuanced by Groza's memoirs, published in the same interval. According to Groza's ambiguous account, Averescu was "honest" and "talented", but "impotent" when it came to challenging the royalty. Groza's book is a questionable source of information, noted for the unsubstantiated allegations against various former PP colleagues.

== Notable members (alphabetical list) ==
- Ion Agârbiceanu
- Elena Alistar
- Zamfir Arbore
- Constantin Argetoianu
- Constantin C. Arion
- Alexandru Averescu
- Ilie Bărbulescu
- I. A. Bassarabescu
- Vladimir Bodescu
- Traian Brăileanu
- Gheorghe Cantacuzino-Grănicerul
- Matei Cantacuzino
- Mateiu Caragiale
- Vladimir Chiorescu
- Vasile Cijevschi
- Constantin Coandă
- Ion Zelea Codreanu
- Andrei Corteanu
- Grigore C. Crăiniceanu
- Vladimir Cristi
- A. C. Cuza
- Dimo Dimitriev
- Dem. I. Dobrescu
- Silviu Dragomir
- Mayer Ebner
- Sebastian S. Eustatziu
- Grigore Filipescu
- Iancu Flondor
- Constantin Garoflid
- Ion Georgescu Obrocea
- Stan Ghițescu
- Octavian Goga
- Vasile Goldiș
- Constantin Gongopol
- Petru Groza
- N. I. Herescu
- Constantin Iancovescu
- Avram Imbroane
- D. R. Ioanițescu
- Take Ionescu
- Dumitru Iov
- Karl Klüger
- Vasile Kogălniceanu
- Alfred Kohlruss
- Yevhen Kozak
- Ion Lapedatu
- Vasile Lucaci
- Antin Lukasevych
- George Lungulescu
- Ioan Lupaș
- Iurii Lysan
- Mihail Manoilescu
- Constantin Meissner
- Teodor Mihali
- Ion Mitilineu
- Anton Mocsonyi de Foeni
- Teodor Neaga
- P. P. Negulescu
- Petru Nemoianu
- Sergiu Niță
- Enric Otetelișanu
- Petre Papacostea
- Dorimedont Popovici
- Nicolae Rădescu
- Constantin Rădulescu-Motru
- Mihail Sadoveanu
- Ioan Simu
- Henric Streitman
- Ioan Suciu
- Corneliu Șumuleanu
- Octavian Tăslăuanu
- Ștefan Tătărescu
- George Topîrceanu
- Grigore Trancu-Iași
- Yehuda Leib Tsirelson
- Ioan Ursu
- Gheorghe Văleanu
- Duiliu Zamfirescu
- Ștefan Zeletin

== Electoral history ==
=== Legislative elections ===
Election	Votes	%	Assembly	Senate	Position
1918			4 / 174	2 / 121	2nd
1919			7 / 568	0 / 216	11th
1920			206 / 366	124 / 166	1st
1922			13 / 372	2 / 148	6th
1926	1,366,160	52.2	292 / 387	107 / 115	1st
1927	53,371	2.0	0 / 387	0 / 113	4th
1928	part of PP-PND alliance		3 / 387	0 / 110	4th
1931	141,141	5.0	10 / 387	0 / 113	4th
1932	64,525	2.2	4 / 387	0 / 113	12th
1933	47,114	1.6	0 / 387	0 / 108	10th
1937	25,567	0.8	0 / 387	0 / 113	12th
