= Ukrainian National Party =

Ukrainian National Party Українська Національна Партія (Ukrainska Natsionalna Partiia) Partidul Național Ucrainean
- President: Volodymyr Zalozetsky-Sas
- Founded: 1926
- Dissolved: March 31, 1938
- Preceded by: Ukrainian National Democratic Party; Ukrainian Social Democratic Party
- Merged into: National Renaissance Front
- Headquarters: National Ukrainian Home, Cernăuți
- Newspaper: Chas; Narod; Narodnia Syla; Ridnyi Krai (to 1930)
- Youth wing: Susor
- Ideology: Ukrainian nationalism Hetmanism; Agrarianism; Corporatism; Producerism; Anti-democracy; Anti-communism; Regionalism; National liberalism (minority); Ukrainian irredentism (minority); Nazism (minority)
- Political position: Right-wing to far-right
- National affiliation: National Union (1931–1932)
- International affiliation: Ukrainian Agrarian Statist Party (1926–1930); Brotherhood of Ukrainian Classocrats-Monarchist Hetmanites (1930)

The Ukrainian National Party (Ukrainian: Українська Національна Партія, Ukrainska Natsionalna Partiia, UNP; Romanian: Partidul Național Ucrainean, PNU) was a right-wing agrarian group, representing the Ukrainian minority in Romania. Its founder and president was the scholar Volodymyr Zalozetsky-Sas, who supported the "classocratic" Hetmanism of Pavlo Skoropadskyi and Vyacheslav Lypynsky; the PNU leadership also included Vasyl Dutchak, Teodor Ivanytsky, and Lev Kohut, who stood for more moderate currents of Ukrainian nationalism. Always strongest among the Ukrainians of Bukovina, the party was united in its opposition to Romanianization, but overall accepted Romanian rule. Its more radical faction, supportive of "Greater Ukraine", gravitated toward the Organization of Ukrainian Nationalists after 1933; the mainstream did not.

The UNP emerged after a seven-year hiatus, during which many Ukrainians boycotted Romanian politics, concentrated on cultural campaigns, or took up repressed causes such as socialism. Returning from self-imposed exile, Zalozetsky-Sas took over for Dutchak and his Ukrainian Social Democratic Party, synchronizing with the Ukrainian nationalist groups in Poland and Czechoslovakia. The attempts to spread the movement into Bessarabia and Maramureș were disavowed by the Romanian authorities.

Founded in 1926, the UNP registered its first electoral gains in 1928, an ally of the National Peasants' Party. Its team contested all the elections of the following nine years, often against other Ukrainians or Rusyns, and almost always in alliance with mainstream parties. Around 1933, its anti-communism made it prone to infiltration by Nazi agents. Its final appearance was during the 1937 race, when it won its last seat in Parliament in cartel with the National Liberal Party. Like all other Romanian parties, the UNP was banned, in early 1938, by the National Renaissance Front. Zalozetsky-Sas and other former UNP leaders served as Ukrainian representatives within the Front before the Soviet occupation of 1940.

== History ==
=== Background ===
By the end of World War I, Austria-Hungary's Duchy of Bukovina had come to be disputed between the Kingdom of Romania and the West Ukrainian People's Republic (ZUNR). Most of the Bukovinian Ukrainians, centered in the northern half, supported incorporation with a Ukrainian state; the Romanians, who were concentrated in the south, formed a General Congress of Bukovina, which obtained the region's de facto incorporation into Greater Romania. As a result, the Ukrainian elites opted to boycott the Congress—Zalozetsky-Sas, Hierotheus Pihuliak, and Stepan Smal-Stotskyi left Bukovina in protest, confident that the Paris Peace Conference would sort matters in their favor. Father Kassian Bogatyrets, who stood for the prewar Russophile movement, remained in Romanian-held territory and represented the Ukrainian community at negotiations with the new administration.

To 1919, Zalozetsky-Sas served the ZUNR's foreign diplomacy as an envoy to German-Austria and Switzerland. After the ZUNR's disestablishment, he also became a celebrated art historian, researching the impact of Gothic and Baroque architecture in Western Ukraine. Politically, he and his mentor Vyacheslav Lypynsky supported the revival of a monarchical Ukrainian Hetmanate, and were ideologically opposed to the left-leaning People's Republic (UNR) and Symon Petliura. Their "classocratic" program fused agrarianism, producerism and corporatism, criticizing party democracy, and upholding Skoropadskyi as the guarantee of Ukrainian unity. In Vienna, Zalozetsky-Sas joined Lypynsky's Ukrainian Agrarian Statist Party (USKhD), which, in 1921, also organized a chapter in Romania—the Union of Ukrainian Agrarians, presided upon by P. Novitsky in Bucharest.

In Bukovina, the Romanian nationalist Ion Nistor and his Democratic Union Party seized the opportunity and ran pro-Romanian Ukrainians and Poles as candidates for the 1919 elections. Active on the left side of the spectrum, Constantin Krakalia joined the Socialist Party. In early 1920, he spent time in prison for protesting against the People's Party (PP) government's clampdown on Ukrainian socialism. He ran in the elections of May against Bogatyrets, taking a seat in the Assembly of Deputies, where he demanded a plebiscite over the territorial status of Bukovina and Maramureș. The election of November 1922 were held under the watch of National Liberal Party (PNL), which supported centralizing policies. During the race, the incumbent Rusyn Senator Jevhen Kozak was arrested and intimidated. Fearing persecution, Krakalia made his way into the opposition Peasants' Party; the other Ukrainian socialists soon came into contact with the Union for the Liberation of Ukraine, and were either arrested or pushed to leave Romania.

Another group, the Ukrainian National Organization, was founded in Cernăuți (Chernivtsi) by lawyers Vasyl Dutchak and Lev Kohut. Kohut edited its weekly Ridnyi Krai, while Dutchak inaugurated the Ukrainian protests against Romanianization, addressing four reports on the matter to the League of Nations. Some referred to the reforms of Constantin Angelescu, the Education Minister, which had made it a requirement for Ukrainian teachers to learn Romanian language and history, while also dissolving the community schools.

=== Establishment ===
In 1922, Dutchak founded his own Ukrainian Social Democratic Party, where he mainly focused on language rights and strategies for the promotion of Ukrainian in legal contexts. At the time, he accused the Romanian establishment of aiming to "effect the destruction of the Ukrainian people in Bukovina". This moderate-critical wing later reemerged and the Ukrainian People's Party and Ukrainian Democratic People's Party, focused on moderate projects of cultural improvement, and being supported by Ridnyi Krai. Their leadership included Dutchak, Kohut, and Antin Lukasevych. Lukasevych and Iurii Lysan both took seats in Parliament in the election of summer 1926, after having caucused with the PP.

Also in 1926, Zalozetsky-Sas made his return to Romania and established the UNP, with support from the Ukrainian National Democratic Alliance in neighboring Poland. It soon after registered as its electoral logo "two circles bordering each other, each split by a vertical diameter". Zalozetsky-Sas was its president, with Yurii Serbyniuk as his second, and with Dutchak, Kohut and Lysan as prominent party organizers. Other major figures of the UNP include Teodor Ivanytsky, Orest Shkraba, and Denis Mayer-Mykhalsky. Another member, Anton Kyrylov, was the manager of its funds, and came up with a scheme whereby all Ukrainians would contribute 10% of their income to the UNP. The party's innovative institutions also included a "High National Court", which passed informal judgments on all contentious issues between Ukrainians.

Its activity centered on Cernăuți, the UNP united more factions than the pro-Hetmanate "classocrats". It was also an ideological successor of Ivan Franko's National Democratic Party (to which Ivanytsky had belonged), and preserved a distinctly liberal wing, under Dutchak. Overall, the party supported national development inside Romania, including the establishment of co-operatives, credit unions and banks, and endorsed land reform; more particularly, it carried the protest against Romanianization, demanding the introduction of Ukrainian-language literature in schools and in Bukovina Orthodox churches. Zalozetsky-Sas was a participant in the International Congress of National Minorities, where he issued reports on the fate of Ukrainians in Romania, but also in Poland and the Soviet Union.

The Romanian writer Dragoș Vitencu reacted against the UNP's claims, arguing that Zalozetsky-Sas actually supported revisionism in favor of a "chimera" project, that of "Greater Ukraine". Such ideas were formally shunned by the UNP leadership, which only asked for a level of decentralization, and also by the UNR, which recognized Bukovina as part of Romania. However, Zalozetsky-Sas made statements advocating the preservation of "strong links" with the Ukrainians of Carpathian Ruthenia and Eastern Galicia. The explicitly irredentist line was preserved by the UNP youth organization, or Susor (affiliated with the Central Union of Ukrainian Students). Susor members staged nationalist propaganda campaigns in the countryside, often in an illegal association with the Plast scouts.

The UNP could count on some 32,000 voters in Bukovina. Its attempts to organize outside the region, among the Ukrainians of Maramureș or Bessarabia, were sabotaged by government, and registered few results. From October 1928, its main tribune was Chas, the only Bukovinian Ukrainian daily. Put out by a staff which included Ivanytsky, Volodymyr Kmitsykevych, Teofil Bryndzan, and Kohut, it merged with Ridnyi Krai in 1930. According to Vitencu, this was an especially dangerous enterprise, which served to "infect the villages" with Ukrainian nationalist ideas. The women's interest pages were edited by Olha Huzar, leader of the women's hromada. Two other periodicals, Narod and Narodnia Syla, were also informally affiliated with the UNP.

=== PNȚ alliance ===
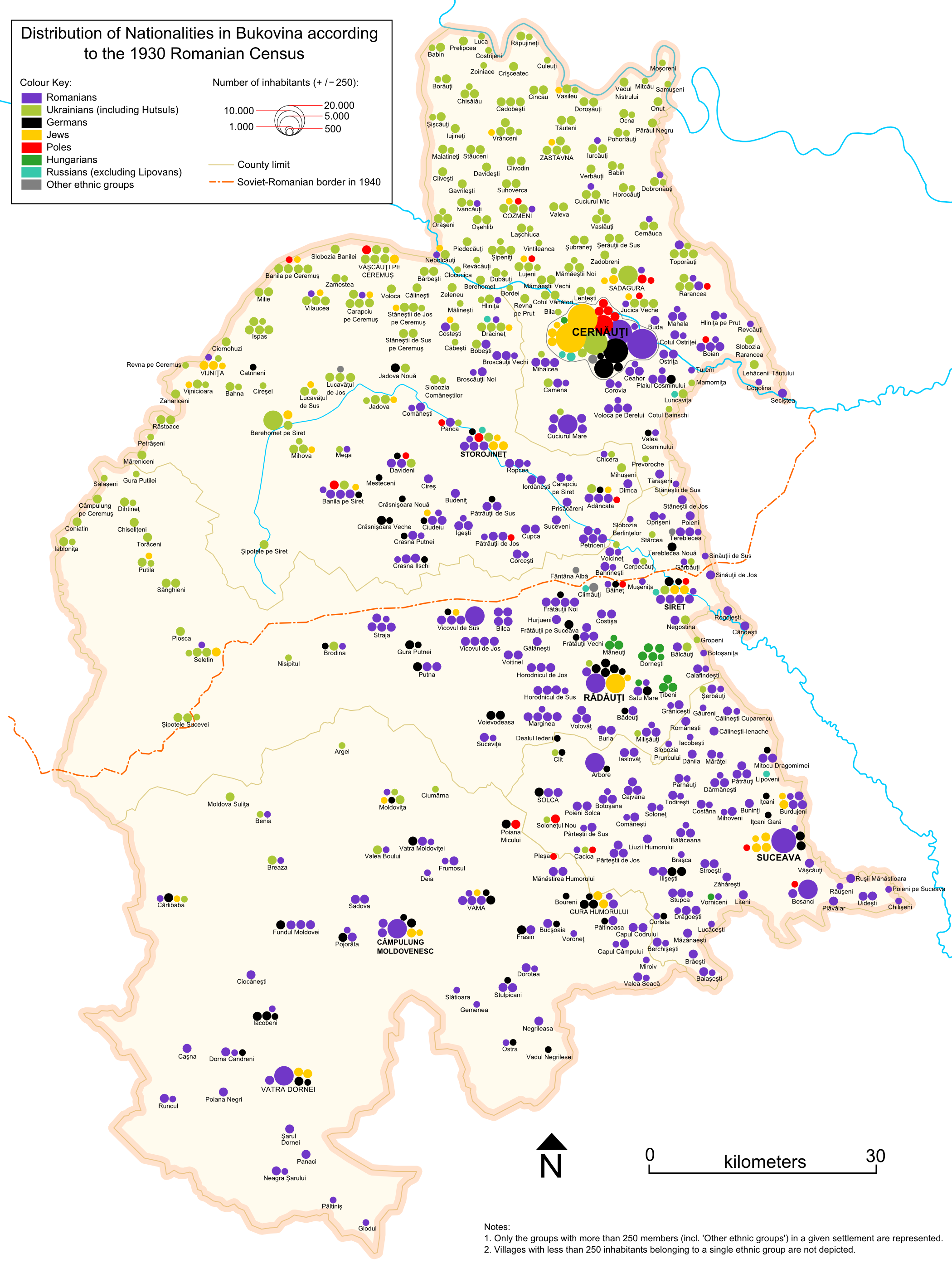
Ethnic map of Bukovina in 1930: Romanians in purple, Ukrainians in pale green, Jews in yellow and Germans in black.

In view of the December 1928 election, the UNP sought to form an alliance with the most Ukrainian-friendly party in the race. This produced, on November 11, an alliance with the opposition National Peasants' Party (PNȚ), which by then had a separate Ukrainian chapter, presided upon by Krakalia. Zalozetsky-Sas ran as a non-member affiliate of the PNȚ (the only UNP man accepted by the latter), winning the Senate seat for Storojineț County. From November 18, he had been reconfirmed as party leader by a 500-strong UNP First Congress. The Executive Committee also included Kohut, Serbyniuk, and Kyrylov. In 1930, during the partial elections for an Assembly seat in Storojineț County, the UNP was able to present a candidate of its own, Dutchak, who won. The following year, it managed the same feat in Cernăuți County, electing Shkraba to a seat previously held by Iacob Pistiner. Before March 1931, the UNP drifted apart from its PNȚ backers, and set up a parliamentary "minorities bloc", also including the German Party and the Magyar Party.

Romania's political situation had changed with the return of Prince Carol, who took over as King of Romania, and appointed Nicolae Iorga as his Prime Minister in April. The previous elections and the UNP success had pushed Rusyns such as Bogatyrets and Kozak out of the political landscape. Their cause was still advanced by Constantin Isopescu-Grecul, who wanted Rusyns to have automatic parliamentary representation. In the end, Premier Iorga and his adviser Rudolf Brandsch preferred an understanding with Zalozetsky-Sas, "paid for by schooling concessions". By then, Krakalia had presented his resignation from the PNȚ. After trying to negotiate his entry into the UNP, he accepted eligible positions with the PP, and later the PNL.

During the elections of June 1931, the UNP, alongside Brandsch's German Party, the Union of Romanian Jews, and Iorga's own Democratic Nationalist Party, ran on a single "National Union" list. Zalozetsky-Sas was reelected on this platform; Serbyniuk and Mayer-Mykhalsky also won seats. The following year, this association broke apart: the UNP, through Serbyniuk, refused to vote for Iorga's debt relief legislation, noting that it provided no help to his community. At the UNP Congress of June 20, 1932, the party formed a new cartel with the PNȚ, and all its three representatives were reconfirmed in the July elections. During the electoral confrontation, the PNL sought to split the UNP vote, presenting Rusyn candidates of its own, such as the former socialist Ivan Hyshka.

In 1930, as the USKhD crumbled into ideologically incompatible factions, Zalozetsky-Sas had rallied with Lypynsky's new group, the Brotherhood of Ukrainian Classocrats-Monarchist Hetmanites (BUKMH), which now opposed Skoropadskyi. The UNP and BUKMH repeatedly clashed with the UNR's government-in-exile, but also took distance from the combatant Organization of Ukrainian Nationalists (OUN), which Chas excoriated in various articles. However, some informal meeting did take place between the UNP and the OUN, notably at Locarno in early 1933. During the latter, Yevhen Konovalets allegedly insisted that Zalozetsky-Sas merge his party into the OUN and become a supporter of the German Nazi Party (the latter had promised Konovalets the restoration of Ukrainian independence). Following the Nazi seizure of power, reports by Siguranța agents suggested that most UNP propagandists, in direct contact with the German agent Fritz Fabritius, had also joined the Romanian National Socialist Party.

=== Final years ===
The UNP leadership acknowledged some improvement in the status of Ukrainians under the PNȚ administrations, but was overall disappointed. Speaking in the Assembly, Serbyniuk described his community's stagnation: "The Rumanian Governments have suppressed all the national cultural rights of the Ukrainians achieved by the latter during the days of Austrian rule by a struggle lasting fifty years. [...] It is particularly painful to us that the natural rights acquired by us in a prolonged struggle should be suppressed by those who have themselves experienced the pain of cultural oppression." By 1933, the party was in open conflict with the PNȚ Prime Minister, Alexandru Vaida-Voevod. Its anti-Soviet stance was heightened at the time, with news of the Terror-Famine leaking out to Bukovina; reportedly, UNP men began spreading praise of Nazi Germany, arguing that German re-armament would bring about a "great and free Ukraine". On September 3, 1933, Romanian infantry troops dispersed a UNP anti-communist gathering in front of Cernăuți Holy Spirit Cathedral, but allowed Zalozetsky-Sas to organize a more discreet vigil.

Before the December 1933 race, Zalozetsky-Sas took the eccentric measure of aligning his party with a small contender, the Radical Peasants' Party (PȚR). Also unusually, he was assigned the top position on the PȚR Assembly list for Cernăuți County—although he lost that battle, he won the Senate seat. On March 3, 1934, Zalozetsky-Sas petitioned the king, outlining his key grievances: "persons belonging to the educated classes who are of Ukrainian nationality are unable to find employment; the Ukrainian children cannot obtain instruction in their mother-tongue; Rumanian priests, most of whom are quite ignorant of Ukrainian, are sent to Ukrainian church parishes." In early 1936, he addressed Parliament with another speech, in which he firmly requested the reintroduction of Ukrainian in schools. In September, he handed his senatorial mandate to Serbyniuk, announcing that he was no longer politically active. However, he failed in his bid to become honorary consul of the Austrian Corporate State, being deemed a "Ukrainian fanatic".

By 1934, the Susor branches, embracing Nazism, had begun defecting to the OUN. The UNP consolidated for a final time in the elections of December 1937, upon the end of Greater Romania's liberal vicennial. Its final alliance was with the PNL and, indirectly, Vaida-Voevod's Romanian Front, whom it reassured of its "absolute loyalty toward the Romanian state". Following a race in which Ukrainians were unusually overrepresented among the candidates of all mainstream parties, the UNP only won one seat—returning to politics, Zalozetsky-Sas was elected to the Assembly.

The party was banned on March 31, 1938 by a National Renaissance Front (FRN) dictatorship, although the former leadership continued to organize, with Zalozetsky-Sas awarded the Senate seat for his Ukrainian community. In October 1939, during the regional upheaval caused by the German invasion of Poland, Zalozetsky-Sas was invited to Bucharest. Silviu Dragomir, the Minister for National Minorities, consulted him on "the possibility of introducing some amelioration of status to the Ukrainian minority". By November, all Ukrainian adults had been formally enlisted into the FRN, with Zalozetsky-Sas, Serbyniuk, Gheorghe Alexievici and Ilie Gavriliu serving as its appointed representatives. Chas continued to appear in Cernăuți until June 26, 1940.

Two days later, the city and the entire north of Bukovina came under a Soviet occupation. Kohut was arrested by the Soviets and sentenced to death, but finally released and allowed to settle in Germany. In June–July 1941, the German–Romanian attack on the Soviet Union reintegrated Bukovina into Romanian territory. This move stirred a protest from the local OUN branch, which appealed to Germany to support the Ukrainian national government. Olha Huzar remained in Bukovina and engaged in nationalist activities. In 1942, she was arrested by the Ion Antonescu regime, and sentenced to a five-year imprisonment for sedition. Following the return of Soviet rule in 1944, she was released, but again arrested by the Soviets in Chernivtsi. Her subsequent fate remains unknown. Dutchak followed the Romanian retreat and settled at Corbeni–Balș, before dying in 1947. Zalozetsky-Sas settled in Graz, where he taught for a while at Charles Francis University, and died at Isperdorf in July 1965.

== Bibliography ==
- Rudolf Agstner, Von Kaisern, Konsuln und Kaufleuten — Österreich und die Ukraine 1785–2010. Про цісарів, консулів і купців — Австрія і Україна 1785–2010. Forschungen zur Geschichte des österreichischen Auswärtigen Dienstes, Band 3. Vienna & Berlin: LIT Verlag, 2011. ISBN 978-3-643-50335-0
- Ionuț Bran, "The Ukrainian Movement in Bukovina. The Ukrainian National Party", in Codrul Cosminului, Nr. 2 (2012), pp. 249–260.
- Ladislaus Fritz, "The Ukrainian National Minority in Rumania", in Danubian Review (Danubian News), Vol. VIII, Issue 6, November 1939, pp. 10–20.
- Daniel Hrenciuc, "Integrarea minorităților naționale din Bucovina în Regatul României Mari (1918–1928). Unele considerații", in Codrul Cosminului, Nr. 12 (2006), pp. 159–177.
- Nicolae Iorga, Memorii. Vol. 6: Încercarea guvernării peste partide: (1931–2). Vălenii de Munte: Datina Românească, 1939.
- Florin-Răzvan Mihai, "Dinamica electorală a candidaților minoritari din Bucovina la alegerile generale din România interbelică", in Vasile Ciobanu, Sorin Radu (eds.), Partide politice și minorități naționale din România în secolul XX, Vol. V, pp. 77–102. Sibiu: TechnoMedia, 2010. ISBN 978-973-739-261-9
- Dragoș Vitencu, Când dai nas lui Ivan... (Mic tratat despre ucrainomanie). Cernăuți: Editura Societății Mazililor și Răzășilor Bucovineni, 1934.
