= Lucaci =

Lucaci is a surname. Notable people with the surname include:

- Constantin Lucaci (1923–2014), Romanian sculptor
- Vasile Lucaci (born 1969), Romanian rugby union player
- Viorel Lucaci (born 1986), Romanian rugby union player
