= Avram Imbroane =

Austro-Hungarian-born Romanian politician, businessman, and Orthodox priest (1880–1938)

Dr. Avram Imbroane
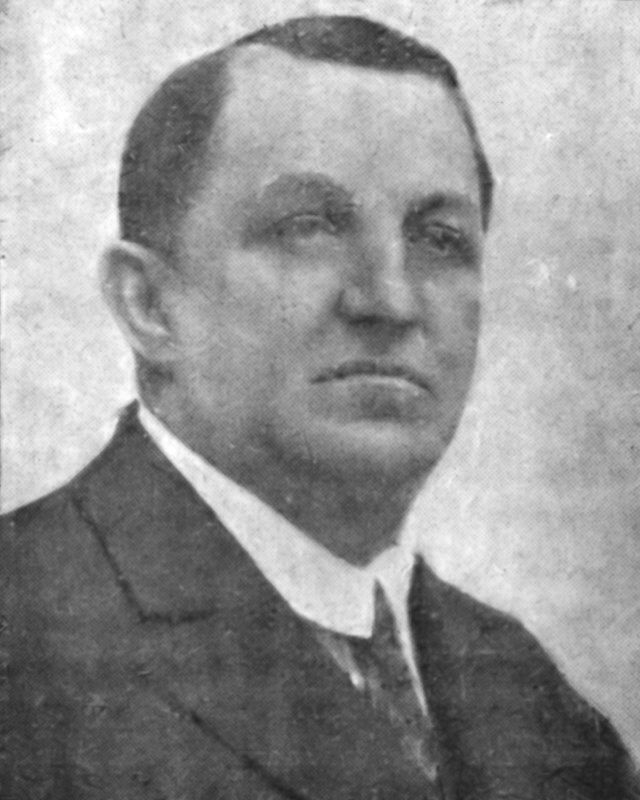
- Born: December 9, 1880; Mélykastély, Austria-Hungary
- Died: September 23, 1938 (aged 57); Bucharest, Kingdom of Romania
- Occupations: Romanian Orthodox priest, politician, industrialist, playwright
- Years active: ca. 1907–1938
- Known for: Nationalist fighter for the union of Banat with Romania

Avram Imbroane (December 9, 1880 – September 23, 1938) was an Austro-Hungarian-born Romanian politician, businessman, and Orthodox priest. Born in the western half of Banat, he was active in nationalist agitation among that region's Romanian community, and later also in Transylvania. By the time of World War I, he supported secession and the unconditional union of Transylvania and the Banat with the Kingdom of Romania. He fled Austria-Hungary and engaged in propaganda work—first in Romania, then among the Transylvanian prisoners-of-war in the Russian Republic. In late 1918, he returned to the Banat and became an active participant in the unionist struggle, participating in the assemblies of the Great Union.

After 1919, Imbroane set up his own political party, the National Union from Banat, which stood on an independent nationalist platform against both the autonomist Romanian National Party and the traditional parties of the Romanian Kingdom. He served in the Assembly of Deputies, becoming its vice president in 1920, and, like his Transylvanian friend Octavian Goga, joined the People's Party. Imbroane's political career became tied to that of Constantin Argetoianu — like Argetoianu, he was frequently accused of running a spoils system centered on state enterprises such as the Reșița works. He followed Argetoianu into the Democratic Nationalist Party, but soon after left that group and rallied with his former nemesis, the National Liberal Party. He remained affiliated with that party for the remainder of his life, although he frequently clashed with its central structures.

Imbroane ended his work in politics with a final stint as Secretary of the Culture and Religious Affairs Ministry, remembered for his disputes with the Romanian Roman Catholics. In his final years, he was involved with the management of Banatian industries and banks, and also worked to develop regional standards in education and culture. He also campaigned for the rights of Romanians in Yugoslavia, and was left aggrieved by the partition of the Banat.

== Biography ==
=== Early career ===
Imbroane was born on December 9, 1880, in Mélykastély (Coștei), a Romanian-inhabited village that is currently part of Vojvodina, Serbia, but was then included in the Hungarian-ruled sectors of Austria-Hungary, and, historically, in the Banat area. His parents were peasants, belonging to the lower strata of the Romanian Banatian community. The couple had another son, Nicolae. Their surname name is a dialectal Romanian variety of the more common Imbroaie (the "n" of the derivative spelling is pronounced [nʲ]); both derive from the given name Imbre.

Avram completed his primary education at the Kuštilj town school, then graduated from the gymnasium of Bela Crkva (Biserica Albă). He spent his high school years, to 1901, in the Transylvanian city of Brașov, graduating from the Șaguna Romanian Lyceum. Imbroane was subsequently enlisted by the Royal Hungarian Honvéd, serving with the 7th Infantry Regiment at Versec, and then graduating from the military school in Szeged. He later began studying law at Budapest University, where he became involved in the Romanian nationalist movement, alongside Vasile Lucaciu and Octavian Goga.

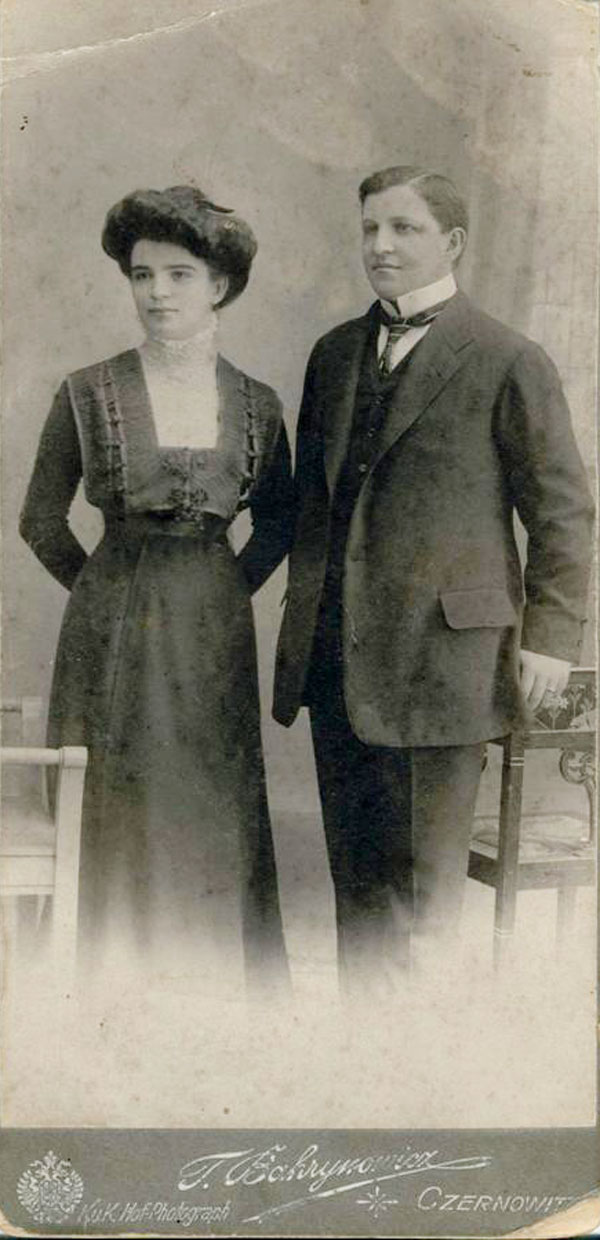
Sofia and Avram Imbroane in Czernowitz (1913)

Passionate about the nationalist cause, Imbroane decided to leave Hungary after only a year worth of law training. He moved to the Kingdom of Romania, and entered the University of Bucharest's Faculty of Letters. He quit when his mother asked him not to leave the Banat behind. Seeking a compromise, Imbroane traveled to the Duchy of Bukovina, which was largely inhabited by educated Romanians and under direct Austrian rule. Enlisting at Czernowitz University's school of theology, he went on to study for a while at the Friedrich Wilhelm University of Berlin, also attending lectures in Economic and Political Science at the Ludwig-Maximilians-Universität München, the University of Breslau, and the Lubrański Academy in Poznań. Upon his return, he was awarded a Doctor of Divinity diploma in 1907, and married Sofia born Tarnovțchi, a Bukovinian schoolteacher who was six years his junior. They had four children together.

Imbroane declined an offer to teach theology at Czernowitz in order to pursue educational and political work among the Romanian Banatians, who had financed his final years of study. He settled in Lugoj, where, by the time of World War I, he was an Orthodox deacon. He became one of the leading contributors to the city newspaper, Drapelul, joining efforts with his former schoolteacher, Valeriu Braniște. Elected president of the Traders' Guild, Imbroane was also involved with various other cultural and social causes. He led a theatrical society and singing club, and wrote one theatrical play: Din Heidelbergul de altădată ("Scenes of the Past in Heidelberg"). In his works of literature and journalism, he often used pen names, including Abd., Ion, I-ne, Luno Caid, Raportor, W. Finic, and N. Finic.

=== World War I ===
Imbroane's political career took off during the elections of 1910, when he canvassed votes for Caius Brediceanu at Temesmóra (Moravița). The Drapelul group broke with the mainstream Romanian National Party (PNR) by supporting the incorporation of Transylvania and the Banat into Romania, rather than cultural and political autonomy under Austria. This stance became a nuisance for the Hungarian authorities after the outbreak of war with Serbia, when Imbroane came to be regarded as a "dangerous agitator". In autumn 1914, Imbroane fled to the still-neutral Kingdom of Romania. He took a job as a schoolteacher, but was also assigned a post in the Ministry of Royal Domains. His family was able to join him before the year's close.

From exile, Imbroane resumed his work as a publicist, this time with openly anti-imperial and irredentist propaganda. Openly asking for a Romanian intervention in the war against Austria, he became a noted contributor to the interventionist newspaper Epoca, and an occasional one to Universul and Adevărul. His contributions were often anonymous, signed as "Un bănățean" ("A Banatian"). Imbroane also toured the country with Nicolae Filipescu and Nicolae Titulescu, speaking at nationalist rallies in cities such as Caracal and Brăila, and joining Filipescu's Unionist Federation. As a consequence of his interventionist campaigning, the Hungarian Prosecutor's Office issued an order for his detainment.

In August 1916, Romania declared war on Austria-Hungary and the other Central Powers. The subsequent campaigns ended in massive defeats and an invasion of the Romanian Kingdom territory. The government relocated to Iași, militarily backed by the Russian Republic. In July 1917, Imbroane, Goga, Sever Bocu and other Romanian defectors from Austria-Hungary were sent by the Iași government on a mission to Russia herself. They carried out propaganda work among the Transylvanian and Bukovinian prisoners-of-war, drawing them into a Volunteer Corps—for this purpose, they set up in Kyiv the newspaper România Mare. He was by then integrated into the Romanian Land Forces as a lieutenant. Stavka recognized Imbroane as a Romanian government envoy and assigned him to approach prisoners working in the coal mines of Bakhmut and Seleznyovsky. According to his colleague Voicu Nițescu, Imbroane was "one of the most industrious, dedicated, and competent" recruiters, but met difficulty dealing with the local soviets. The latter wanted the Romanians kept in place until replaced by other captives.

In early September, Imbroane and his commission left the Donbas to complete new recruitment missions in Kazan, before being assigned to such work in Perm, Yekaterinburg, and the Ural at large. Following the October Revolution, which took Russia out of the war, he rejoined Bocu in Iași. At the time, a government under Alexandru Marghiloman was called in to negotiate peace with the Central Powers. Reportedly, Marghiloman put pressure on Imbroane to abandon his nationalist propaganda, but the latter refused, declaring that he'd "rather die".

=== Union Day and UNB creation ===
The Romanian peace was nullified by the November 11 Armistice, which brought down the Central Powers as a whole, accelerating the territorial breakup of Austria-Hungary (see Aster Revolution). On his way to propagate the Banat Romanian cause in France and Britain, Imbroane made a secretive visit to his native land, where an unrecognized democratic republic had just been superseded by a Serbian intervention. He collected terrain data which he later provided to the Supreme War Council. On November 24, he met with the Romanian National Council, which opposed incorporation into Serbia, and proposed to them that Banat unite with Romania unilaterally and unconditionally. Later, this demand was supplemented by a call for Romanian Banatians to defend the region against other countries. Imbroane and other Romanian nationalists also preserved contacts with Stefan Frecôt, a leader of the German-speaking Danube Swabian community, who soon became a supporter of Banat's unconditional union.

Imbroane was subsequently selected as one of 44 members sent by the Banat to the Great Romanian Council, which designated a provisional government, or Directing Council of Transylvania and claimed jurisdiction over the Banat. On December 1, 1918, day in which the Great Union happened, Imbroane and Braniște were among the Banat delegates to the Great National Assembly of Alba Iulia which voted for union. Both supported the agenda of unconditional unification against the more reserved PNR autonomists. Also voting for union on that day was Imbroane's brother Nicolae, delegated by the Romanians of Moravița.

In January 1919, Avram made a new home in Bucharest, where he began putting out a political newspaper, Banatul (later, Banatul Românesc, "The Romanian Banat"), moving it to Lugoj, then Timișoara, in August of that year. For a while, he seconded Aurel Cosma, who had been appointed Prefect of the recently formed Caraș County. Imbroane invited the novelist and Romanian war veteran Camil Petrescu to take over as Banatul's editor-in-chief, but the latter resigned in March 1920, after disagreements over Imbroane's political line. Imbroane himself wrote for the paper, using such pen names as A.I., Ibr., Imb., and Preotul ("The Priest"). Imbroane had another stint in Paris, where he attended the Peace Conference and pleaded for the Romanian unionist cause. In July, he became a delegate to the Great Council of Transylvania, a short-lived legislative branch of the Directing Council. He served on its Electoral Reform Board, alongside Octavian Codru Tăslăuanu, Sever Miclea, and various others.

Following the informal establishment of Greater Romania, he enshrined his opposition to the Transylvanian PNR and the Kingdom's National Liberal Party (PNL), setting up his own National Union from Banat (UNB). Its creation was announced by Imbroane himself in Banatul Românesc of October 23, 1919. Demanding government by "new men", the UNB represented to some extent a facet of Banatian regionalism, which had undercut PNR policies at various points in history. Its program outlined Imbroane's support for full regional integration (with a degree of decentralization, minority rights, and all-around democratization) and his rejection for any partitioning of the Banat between Romania and the emerging Kingdom of Yugoslavia. The UNB also focused on demands such as cultural protectionism for the Banat community, and looked forward to the unification of Orthodox and Greek-Catholic rites into a "national church".

=== People's Party deputy ===
Imbroane's party could not hope to affect politics on a national scale, but sought to compensate by bringing in other PNR defectors, including his own brother Nicolae, but also Tăslăuanu and Petru Groza. The UNB presented regional lists in the national election of November 1919, and registered important victories at that level of the political pyramid. In all, it held four seats in the Assembly of Deputies, two of which were won by Imbroane. He had run simultaneously for Lugoj (against Braniște) and Gătaia. As early as December 1919, Imbroane voiced attacks against the Directing Council, which he identified as a relic of Transylvanian separatism; his discourse won support from the National Liberals, who also backed the centralist line. Reportedly, his enthusiasm for the core PNL stances led that party to organize a banquet in his honor, addressing him as the "Christ of the Banat".

For a short interval in 1919–1920, Imbroane was a member of the PNL. Nevertheless, some time after, he and his reconstituted UNB formed a cartel with the anti-PNL People's Party (PP) of Alexandru Averescu, agreeing to fuse into it during the PP Congress of April 16, 1920. The negotiations brought him into contact with Averescu's factotum, Constantin Argetoianu, who recalled that Imbroane, "the defrocked, uncultured priest", was ready for an unconditional merger—"his only wish was to see the Banat breaking free from the grip of the Directing Council". Imbroane contested a deputy seat at Lugoj in the election of May 1920, managing to win against the PNL's leader, Ion I. C. Brătianu. Since 1914, the two rivals had been related by marriage: Brătianu's grandnephew, Radu D. Brătianu, had married Nicolae Imbroane's daughter, Maria.

The election upset cooled relations between Imbroane and the National Liberals, whose press referred to the "ex-deacon" and a "morally unbalanced" person. The PNR also attacked the UNB's group merger with the PP, claiming that Imbroane and the others had "not a trace of character". Imbroane retaliated against his political adversaries by focusing on the PNL Mayor of Timișoara, Stan Vidrighin, whom he accused of embezzlement and of favoritism toward the city's Hungarians and Jews. His own core of dedicated supporters in the city included the classical composer Filaret Barbu, who believed that Imbroane was "a genius".

Imbroane maintained a conditional support for the Averescu government, disliking its external policy. In December 1920, he protested in the Assembly against news, which turned out to be true, that Banat was to be divided into Romanian and Yugoslavian halves. He also criticized the Foreign Minister, Take Ionescu, for negotiating an "arbitrary" border with the Hungarian Regency. By July 1921, appointed Vice President of the Assembly (seconding Duiliu Zamfirescu), Imbroane was involved in the scandal over the nationalization of the Reșița works, formerly an Austrian concern. The government appointed him a trustee of the new Steel Works and Domains of Reșița (UDR) company, of which Zamfirescu was CEO. On November 15, he also joined the board of the Farmers' Bank of Cluj, as a government appointee. This public–private partnership was tasked with funding the projected land reform.

During the closing months of 1921, most of the former UNB deputies clashed with Imbroane and the PP leadership over the issue of land reform and Austrian asset management. They group wanted such reforms postponed in the Banat, whereas Imbroane supported them, siding with Argetoianu, the Finance Minister. In December 1921, their debate erupted into a public scandal when Imbroane was accused of having a conflict of interest in his position at the Farmers' Bank and the UDR.

=== PNL merger ===
On October 15, 1922, Imbroane registered with his former PNL rivals, his new affiliation ridiculed by the left-wing Adevărul as "an extraordinary case of transformism". Argetoianu, publicly accused by Averescu of financial misdeeds, left the PP in December 1923. Imbroane and his entire Banat section, who had rejoined with the PP, rallied with the dissident former leader; other Transylvanians, including Goga, remained loyal to Averescu. Nicolae Imbroane also remained loyal to the PP, and successfully ran on its Caraș County list during the election of May–June 1926. He then presided upon the PP's "Bloc of Banatian Deputies", conditioning support for Averescu on the meeting of specific regional demands.

The Argetoianu–Imbroane faction eventually merged with Nicolae Iorga's Democratic Nationalist Party, which subsequently styled itself "Nationalist People's Party". Banatul Românesc became that group's regional platform. Based in Timișoara, where he was vice president of the PNL section and took a deputy seat in the June 1927 election, Imbroane maintained his contacts with the PP. In October 1928, under a Vintilă Brătianu-led PNL administration, Adevărul reported that Imbroane intended to take his supporters back into Averescu's party, following disagreements with Prefect Iuliu Coste. According to such reports, Imbroane was only appeased when the government agreed to finance "Mercur Bank and Danubia Society, both of which are presided upon by his eminence." Although promoted to head of the PNL chapter in 1930 and elected to the Assembly for a final time in 1931, in 1932 he was again clashing with the central PNL leadership and its delegate, Richard Franasovici. At the time, he announced his readiness to sign up with the breakaway "Georgist" Liberals. In 1933, however, he was still at the helm of Timișoara's PNL chapter.

His other cause was the denunciation of ethnic policies in Yugoslavia, where his native village had been included. On December 1, 1929, he hosted a Timișoara Congress of Romanian Refugees from Yugoslavia, which castigated Petar Živković and his government for their alleged persecution of the Romanian Serbs and violation of mutual treaties with Romania. Imbroane's final decade was largely spent on cultural projects: he campaigned for the establishment of a Banat university, a printing press, and new schools. Sofia Imbroane was also noted for her work as a folk-art curator and reproducer of folk-inspired handicrafts. Before her sudden death on February 24, 1933, she served as headmistress of the Timișoara Housekeeping School. By 1935, an alley of the city had been named in her honor.

=== Final years ===
In 1934, with the advent of a PNL-staffed cabinet under Gheorghe Tătărescu, Imbroane returned to serve as General Secretary of Religious Affairs, assisting Culture Minister Alexandru Lapedatu. His mission pitted him against the Roman Catholic lobbies, which asked that Romania grant unconditional recognition and funding to Hungarian-manned monastic orders: the Piarists and the Minorites. Imbroane refused, insisting that recognition would only be granted once the two orders would submit to state controls.

Imbroane registered a final success in his plan to build the Timișoara Orthodox Cathedral. By 1936, when he left his job at the Ministry, he was also a board member of several major industrial and commercial enterprises of the Banat: the glass trading company Vitrium S.A., the textile manufacturing concern Industria Textilă S.P.A.I., and, alongside Mihail Manoilescu, the wool-makers Industria Lânei S.A. A recipient of the Order of the Crown, he was still serving as president of the Liberal Club in Timiș-Torontal.

Imbroane died in Bucharest, after a prolonged illness, on September 23, 1938. According to his funeral oration, held by Sever Bocu, he had been forever saddened by the permanent loss of his native village to Yugoslavia, still dreaming a "fantastic vision" of natural borders on the Tisa. Imbroane's career was revisited decades later by Nicolae Corneanu, the Metropolis of Banat, who called attention to Imbroane as a "model for anyone wishing to enter politics", and referred to his combination of national tenets and Christian ideas. However, according to a 2014 piece in Renașterea of Lugoj, he remains a "little known" figure in his native region, "although one would be hard pressed to find a more impressive representative of [Lugoj] city".
