= Antin Lukasevych =

Ukrainian politician (1873–1936)

Anton von Lukasevich
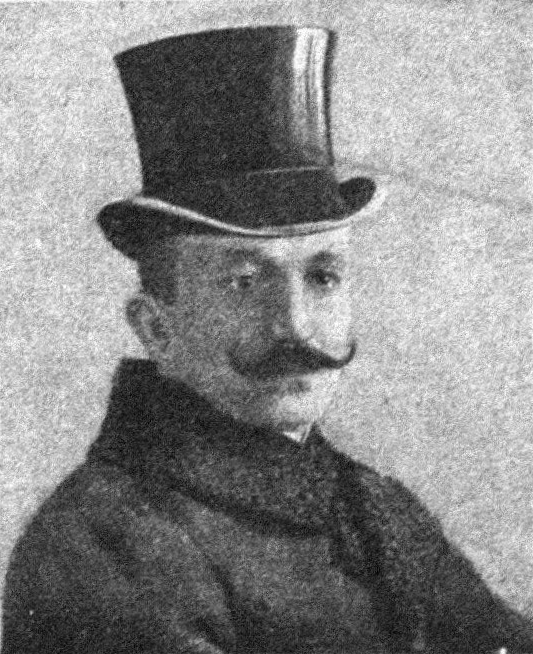

Deputy of the Imperial Council
- In office 1907–1918

Member of the Ukrainian National Council
- In office 1918–1919

Member of the Chamber of Deputies
- In office 1920–1922

Member of the Senate of Romania
- In office 1926–1927

Member of the Diet of Bukovina
- In office 1911–1918

Personal details
- Born: February 18, 1870 Babyn, Duchy of Bukovina, Austro-Hungarian Empire
- Died: May 23, 1936 (aged 66) Cernăuți, Kingdom of Romania
- Resting place: Central (Ruthenian) Cemetery, Chernivtsi
- Citizenship: Austria-Hungary; Kingdom of Romania
- Education: University of Czernowitz
- Occupation: Politician, lawyer
- Awards: Officer’s Cross of the Order of Franz Joseph

Antin or Anton von Lukasevich (in Ukrainian: Антін Лукашевич, also Anton Lukasevych; in German: Anton Lukaschewicz von Luk; in Romanian: Anton de Lukașevici; 18 February 1870 – 23 May 1936) was a Ukrainian politician from Bukovina. He was a deputy of the Austrian Imperial Council (Reichsrat), a member of the Ukrainian National Council of the West Ukrainian People’s Republic (1918), a deputy of the Romanian Parliament (1920) and a senator (1926–1927). He was awarded the Officer’s Cross of the Order of Franz Joseph in 1914.

== Biography ==
Anton Lukasevich was born on 18 February 1870 in Babyn, Duchy of Bukovina, into the family of landowner and notary (since 1882) Aitalo Lukasevich (d. 1886). He was a Greek Catholic.

He studied at the Chernivtsi Gymnasium (until 1889) and later at Chernivtsi University (Faculty of Law, until 1893). After graduation, he worked in the regional government, from 1895 in the administration of Kitsman district, and in 1900 as a trainee in the Siret district administration. In 1901 he became vice-secretary of the Regional School Council, and in 1914 its secretary. In these positions he supported the development of Ukrainian education in Bukovina. He attained the rank of Hofrat (“Court Councillor”). During World War I, he was a member of the Ukrainian Committee for Aid to Refugees from Galicia and Bukovina in Vienna.

== Political activity ==
=== Austrian period ===
In 1907, Lukasevich was elected deputy to the Austrian Imperial Council from the 7th district (Zastavna). Together with other Ukrainian deputies from Bukovina and Galicia, he joined the “Ukrainian Club”, which demanded Ukrainian autonomy within Austria-Hungary, including Eastern Galicia, Northern Bukovina, and Transcarpathia.

In 1909, Bukovinian deputies left the Ukrainian Club and formed the “Bukovinian Club” under Mykola Vasylko, due to disagreements over parliamentary tactics. In 1911, Lukasevich was re-elected to parliament and participated in the founding of the Ukrainian Parliamentary Union of Bukovina and Galicia.

During World War I, he was a member of the Main Ukrainian Council (1914) and the General Ukrainian Council (1915). From December 1916, he joined the Union of Ukrainian Parliamentary and Diet Deputies of Bukovina.

=== Bukovinian Diet ===
At the last elections to the Diet of Bukovina in 1911, Lukasevich was elected deputy from the Zastavna constituency. He supported measures for peasant farms, local industries, road construction, trade development, and Ukrainian schooling.

=== Struggle for Ukrainian statehood ===
On 19 October 1918, Lukasevich, as a member of the Bukovinian delegation, participated in the creation of the Ukrainian National Council. He served on its financial and economic commissions and contributed to the formation of the Ukrainian Regional Committee. He helped organize the Bukovinian People’s Assembly and local meetings in Zastavna district, working to establish a provisional Ukrainian administration.

He later represented the West Ukrainian People's Republic in Austrian institutions and received several distinctions.

He served for a while as the treasurer of the Pope.

=== Romanian period ===
After the union of Bukovina with Romania, Lukasevich returned to Chernivtsi, renamed Cernăuți. Initially he cooperated with Alexandru Averescu’s government, believing its promises of minority rights.

In 1920, he was elected deputy of the Romanian Parliament from the Vyzhnytsia (Vijnița) constituency. His public declaration of loyalty of Bukovinian Ukrainians to Romania caused protests among Ukrainian youth groups, who vandalized his house. In June 1922, he publicly denied signing any agreements renouncing Ukrainians’ rights in Bukovina.

Despite this controversy, he continued to support Ukrainian education and protested against Romanianization policies.

In 1922, he co-founded the Ukrainian National Organization, which became the Ukrainian National Party in 1927.

Between 1926 and 1927, Lukasevich served as a senator in the Senate of Romania, where he defended Ukrainian minority rights and opposed Romanian nationalist policies. He published numerous articles in local and foreign press and submitted appeals to the League of Nations against the discrimination of Ukrainians in Bukovina.

He died on 23 May 1936 in Chernivtsi and was buried in the Central Cemetery.

== See also ==
- History of Bukovina
- West Ukrainian People's Republic
- Ukrainians in Romania
