= Matei B. Cantacuzino =

Romanian lawyer and judge

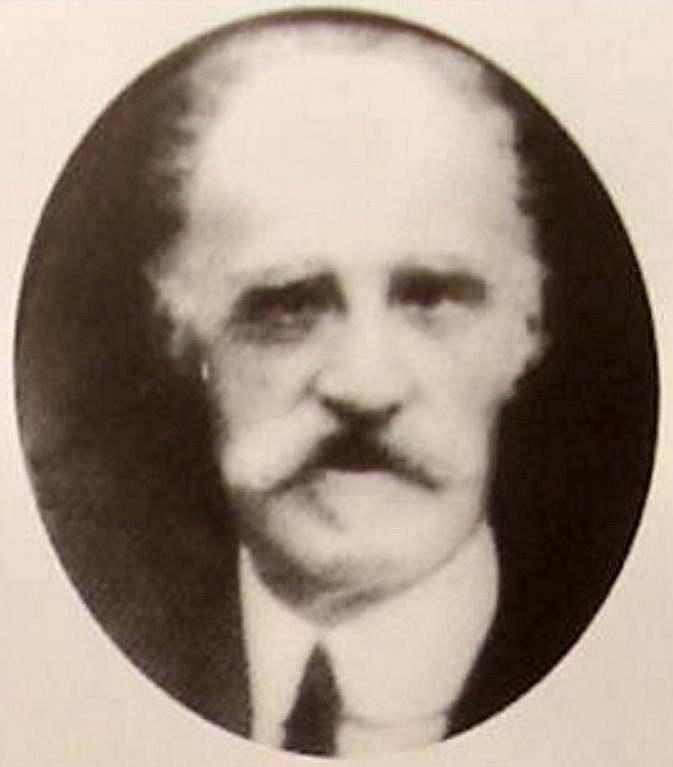
Matei B. Cantacuzino

Matei B. Cantacuzino (July 10, 1855 – August 10, 1925) was a Romanian jurist and politician.

A scion of the Cantacuzino family, his parents were Basile Cantacuzino and Pulcheria Rosetti-Bălănescu; he had four sisters (one of whom died in childhood) and two brothers. Born in Fântâna Mare, Suceava County, he studied philosophy and law at the Royal Saxon Polytechnic Institute in Dresden and the Academy of Lausanne. He then studied law at Heidelberg University and at the University of Paris, where he received a law degree in 1877. In 1878, he became an alternate judge at the Iași courthouse. Between 1885 and 1900, he was a full judge there, as well as an attorney at the Iași appeals court. From 1900 until his death, he was a lawyer in private practice. Starting in 1901, he was a professor in the civil law department of the University of Iași. During World War I, from 1916 to 1918, he was the university's rector. His most important volume was the 1921 Elementele dreptului civil ("The Elements of Civil Law"), in which he depicted the chief elements of the Romanian civil law system.

A prominent member of the Conservative Party, he sided with its Junimea faction during a temporary schism in 1907—becoming the Junimist chief in Iași. As a Conservative Cantacuzino sat in the Romanian Chamber of Deputies; he served as mayor of Iași from December 1912 to January 1914. He was minister in two of Alexandru Averescu's cabinets: Religious Affairs and Education, from January to March 1918; and Justice, from March to August 1920.

In April 1918, together with Constantin Argetoianu, he became a founding member of the Averescu-led People's League. He joined the Peasants' Party in December 1923. His only son Vasile, a lieutenant in the Romanian Army, was killed in the Ciurea rail disaster of January 1917, which deeply marked him for the remainder of his days.
