= Stadionul Central (Recea) =

Romanian stadium

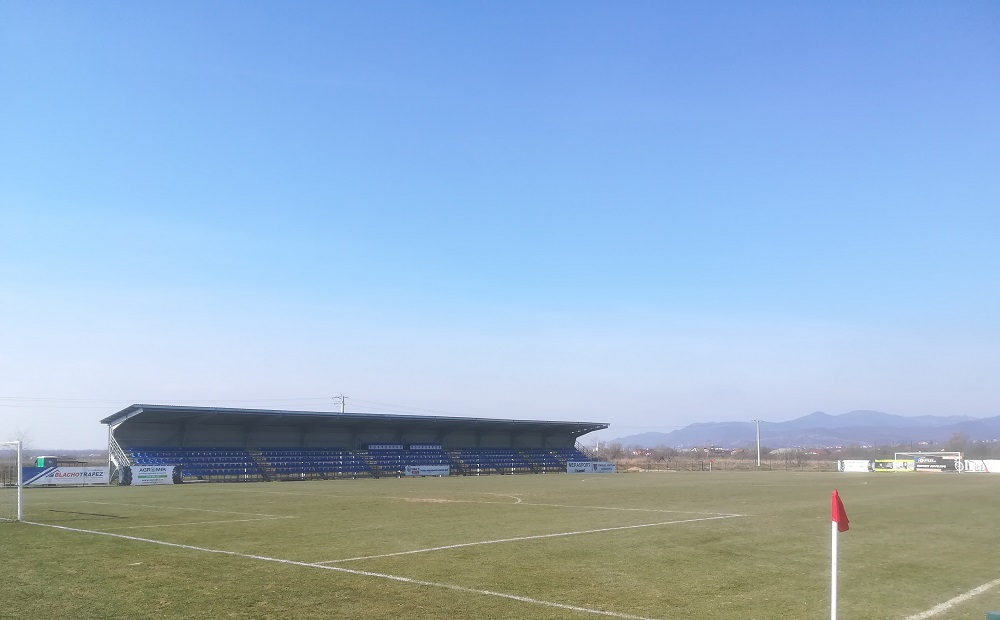
- Interactive map of Stadionul Central
- Address: Str. Stadionului
- Location: Recea, Romania
- Coordinates: 47°38′21″N 23°30′34″E
- Owner: Commune of Recea
- Operator: Academica Recea; Independența Baia Mare
- Capacity: 1,000 (600 seated)
- Surface: Grass

Construction
- Opened: 9 May 2018
- Cost: € 300,000

Tenants
- Academica Recea (2018–present); Independența Baia Mare (2018–present)

Stadionul Central is a multi-use stadium in Recea, Romania. It is used mostly for football matches and is the home ground of Academica Recea and Independența Baia Mare. The stadium was opened on 9 May 2018, having a covered stand of 600 seats, a pitch covered with grass and a second training ground. The total cost of the construction was amount €300,000.
