= Durlești =

- Town
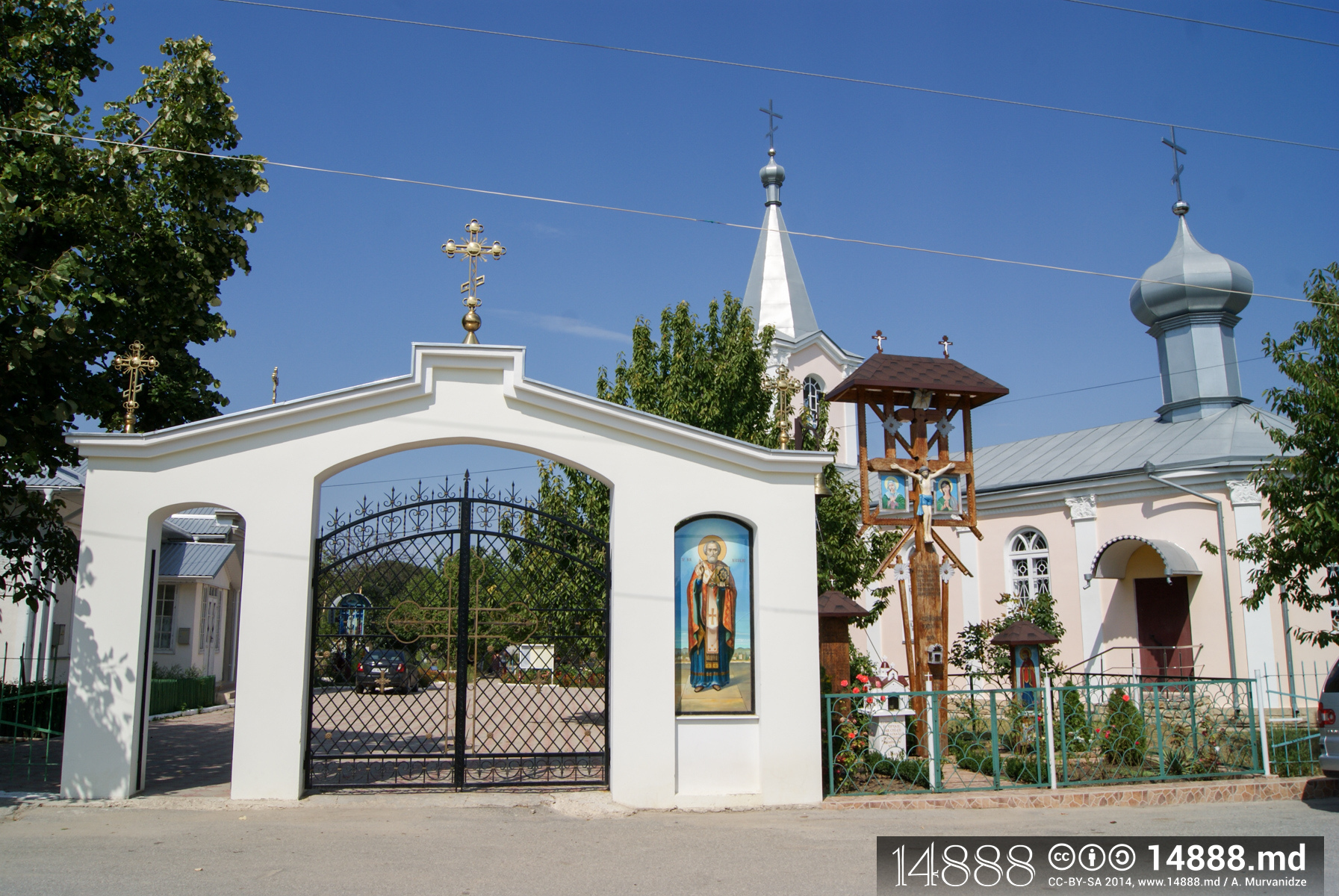
- St. Nicholas Church in Durlești

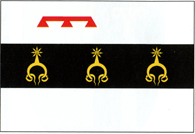
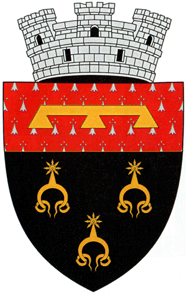
- Flag Coat of arms

- Location in Moldova
- Coordinates: 47°02′N 28°57′E
- Country: Moldova
- Municipality: Chișinău

Government
  - Mayor: Eleonora Șaran (CUB)

Area
  - Town: 3.1 sq mi (8 km^{2})
  - Metro: 11.9 sq mi (30.8 km^{2})

Population (2024)
  - Town: 26,308
  - Density: 7,330/sq mi (2,829/km^{2})
- Time zone: UTC+2 (EET)
  - Summer (DST): UTC+3 (EEST)
- Postal code: MD-2003
- Website: Official website=

Durlești (Romanian pronunciation: [durˈleʃtʲ]) is a town in Chișinău municipality, Moldova. Located on the northwestern outskirts of the capital, contiguous with the Buiucani sector, it is the largest of Chișinău’s suburbs.

== History ==
Archaeological excavations indicate that the area of present-day Durlești has been inhabited since the early centuries of the 2nd millennium CE, with evidence of stable medieval settlements. The locality as known today developed from two earlier settlements — Cartușa and Durlești.

An early reference dates to 7 April 1636, mentioning a land grant held by Magda, daughter of a certain Drulea-Spătar, from Voivode Ștefan. The village, originally called Drulești, shared its name with another settlement in the Romanian lands — for example, a document by Voivode Ștefan Tomșa mentions “Ionașco from Drulești” in Roman County — which can complicate interpretation of historical sources. While the settlement was previously believed to exist since 1721, during Mihai Racoviță’s reign (Statistical Dictionary of Bessarabia, 1923), the earliest confirmed record dates to 1 June 1656, when Voivode Gheorghe Ștefan issued a charter confirming land purchases by Onofrei and Ionașcu Bucșan.

== Demographics ==
According to the 2024 census, 26,308 inhabitants lived in Durlești, an increase compared to the previous census in 2014, when 17,210 inhabitants were registered.

Ethnic composition of Durlești (2024)
1. Moldovans (Note: There is an ongoing controversy regarding the ethnic identification of Moldovans and Romanians.) (77.3%)
2. Romanians (17.7%)
3. Russians (1.70%)
4. Ukrainians (1.70%)
5. Others (1.50%)
Linguistic composition of Durlești (2024)
1. Romanian (60.0%)
2. Moldovan (Note: In March 2023, the Parliament of Moldova passed a law updating all legislative texts and the constitution to refer to the national language as Romanian, effectively rendering the term "Moldovan" obsolete.) (31.2%)
3. Russian (6.90%)
4. Ukrainian (1.10%)
5. Other (0.80%)

Historical population
Year	Pop.	±%
1989	17,807	—
2004	15,395	−13.5%
2014	17,210	+11.8%
2024	26,308	+52.9%

== Notable people ==
- Vladimir Bodescu (1868–1941), Bessarabian politician and lawyer who voted for the Union of Bessarabia with Romania
- Petru Buburuz (born 1937), Orthodox parish priest and politician, served in the Supreme Soviet of the Soviet Union and officiated the blessing of the Grand National Assembly in 1989

== International relations ==
=== Twin towns – Sister cities ===
Durlești is twinned with:

- Blaj, Romania
