= Petru Buburuz =

Moldovan politician (born 1937)

Member of the Supreme Soviet of the Soviet Union
- In office 1989–1991

Personal details
- Born: 26 September 1937 (age 88) Durleşti, Kingdom of Romania
- Party: Popular Front of Moldova
- Spouse: Nadejda
- Children: Iurie, Vladimir

Petru Buburuz (born 26 September 1937) is an Orthodox parish priest and politician from the Republic of Moldova. He served as a member of the Supreme Soviet of the Soviet Union and editor in chief of Luminătorul.

== Biography ==
Petru Buburuz was born to Dumitru and Anastasia, on 26 September 1937 in Durleşti. In 1989 election, Buburuz campaigned under the motto "The People's Will--God's Will" and was elected as a member of the Supreme Soviet of the Soviet Union.

Buburuz's victory made him probably the only clergyman thus far known to have been elected to the Congress of People's Deputies of the Soviet Union as an unofficial candidate affiliated with informal national movements. He was also a contributor to Glasul (for which he has been admonished by the Chişinău metropolitanate). On 27 August 1989, Buburuz blessed the Grand National Assembly in Chişinău.
