= CS Academica Recea =

Romanian football club

Academica Recea
- Full name: Clubul Sportiv Academica Recea
- Nicknames: Recenii (The People from Recea)
- Short name: Recea
- Founded: 2013; 13 years ago as ACSF Recea; 2022; 4 years ago as Academica Recea
- Ground: Central
- Capacity: 1,000
- Owner: Recea Commune
- Chairman: Bogdan Roman
- Manager: Marius Marincaș
- League: Liga IV
- 2025–26: Liga IV, Maramureș County, 1st
Home colours	Away colours

Clubul Sportiv Academica Recea, commonly known Academica Recea, or simply as Recea, is a pro Romanian football club based in Recea, Maramureș County.

The team was founded in 2013 and promoted to Liga III at the end of the 2014–15 season, after a promotion play-off against Voința Cetate, winners of Bistrița-Năsăud County series. After a two-legged tie Recea won 5–4 and promoted for the first time in its history in the Liga III. Even if the club was founded in 2013, on the club's logo appear 2015 as the year of foundation, this year being the one in which the club was legally reorganized and changed its name from AS Comuna Recea to ACSF Comuna Recea. After it was relegated, in the summer of 2021 from the Liga II back to the Liga III, the club was dissolved.

After one year of inactivity the football club was re-founded as Academica Recea and enrolled in the Liga IV. And they promovated in Liga III after beating Victoria Viisoara 3-2

== History ==
=== Founding and ascension of Recea (2013–present) ===
Even if the current club was founded in 2013, the history of football from Recea started back in 1959, when Dinamo Săsar, club based in the village of Săsar, Recea Commune, was founded. The team was in tight relation with Dinamo București, having a fulminating ascent and promoting in the second league at the end of the 1959–60 season. The club played for two years in the second tier, then relegated and never came back.

The club was founded in 2013, under the name of AS Comuna Recea and was enrolled in the fourth tier, Liga IV, South series. In its first season Comuna Recea finished 3rd after FCM Baia Mare's second squad and Speranța Coltău. In the second season Recenii won the series, four points ahead Viitorul Ulmeni and played the final of Maramureș County series against North series winners, Bradul Vișeu. The final was played on Viorel Mateianu Stadium in Baia Mare and Recea won 2–1 after extra time and qualified for the Liga III promotion play-off where after a two-legged tie against Voința Cetate, champions of Bistrița-Năsăud County, won 5–4 and promoted for the first time in its history in the Liga III.

After it was relegated in the summer of 2021, from the Liga II back to the Liga III it was dissolved, then after one year of inactivity the football club was re-founded as Academica Recea and enrolled in the Liga IV.

== Grounds ==
Academica Recea plays its home matches on Central Stadium in Recea. The stadium was opened on 9 May 2018, having a covered stand of 600 seats, a pitch covered with grass and a second training ground. The total cost of the construction was amount €300,000.

Between 2014 and 2018, when the stadium was under construction, Recenii played their home matches on Comunal Stadium, in the village of Săsar, Recea commune, with a capacity of 100 seats. In the 2013–14 season, the first after foundation, the team played on the Mocira Stadium, in the village of Mocira, same Recea commune.

== Honours ==
Liga III

- Winners (1): 2019–20
- Runners-up (2): 2017–18, 2018–19

Liga IV – Maramureș County

- Winners (3): 2014–15, 2022–23, 2023–24

== Former managers ==
- (Romania) Ciprian Danciu (2019–2020)

== League history ==
Season	Tier	Division	Place	Cupa României
2026–27	3	Liga III	TBD	
2025–26	4	Liga IV (MM)	1st (C, P)	
2024–25	4	Liga IV (MM)	1st (C)	
2023–24	4	Liga IV (MM)	1st (C)	
2022–23	4	Liga IV (MM)	1st (C)	
2021–22	not active	not active	not active	not active
2020–21	2	Liga II	14th (R)	Fourth Round
2019–20	3	Liga III (Seria V)	1st (C, P)	Fourth Round
2018–19	3	Liga III (Seria V)	2nd	Fourth Round
2017–18	3	Liga III (Seria V)	2nd	Third Round
2016–17	3	Liga III (Seria V)	5th	Third Round
2015–16	3	Liga III (Seria V)	7th	
2014–15	4	Liga IV (MM)	1st (C, P)	
