= Recea, Maramureș =

Recea
- Commune
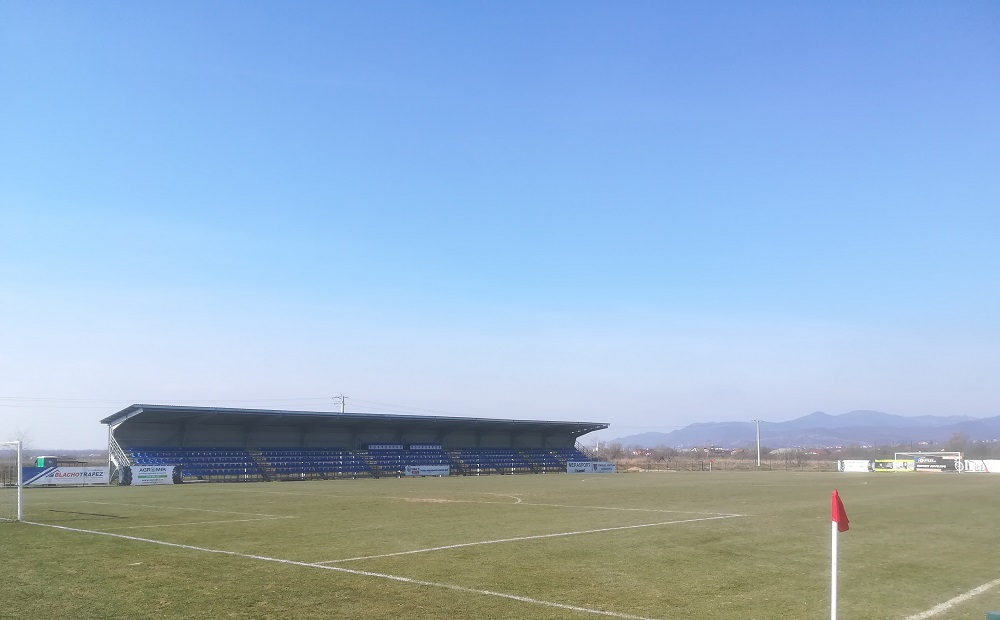
- Stadionul Central in Recea

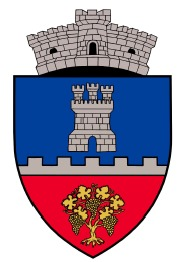
- Coat of arms

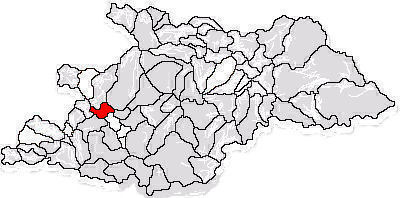
- Location in Maramureș County

- Location in Romania
- Coordinates: 47°38′N 23°30′E
- Country: Romania
- County: Maramureș

Government
  - Mayor (2020–2024): Octavian Pavel (PSD)
- Area: 49.88 km^{2} (19.26 sq mi)
- Elevation: 545 m (1,788 ft)
- Population (2021-12-01): 6,642
  - Density: 133.2/km^{2} (344.9/sq mi)
- Time zone: UTC+02:00 (EET)
  - Summer (DST): UTC+03:00 (EEST)
- Postal code: 437225
- Area code: (+40) 02 62
- Vehicle reg.: MM
- Website: www.primaria-recea.ro

Recea (Hungarian: Lénárdfalva) is a commune in Maramureș County, Romania. It is composed of five villages: Bozânta Mică (Kisbozinta), Lăpușel (Hagymáslápos), Mocira (Láposhidegkút), Recea (Lénárdfalva), and Săsar (Zazár).

== Geography ==
The commune is located in the western part of Maramureș County, 7 km (4.3 mi) southwest of the county seat, Baia Mare, and belongs to the Baia Mare metropolitan area. It lies on the banks of the river Lăpuș and its right tributary, the Săsar; the river Borcut flows into the latter near the village Săsar.

Recea is crossed by national road DN1C (part of European route E58), which runs from Cluj-Napoca north towards Baia Mare and the border crossing at Halmeu, where it connects with the Ukrainian highway M26. The town has two train stations (Lăpușel and Săsar), both serving the CFR Main Line 400, which connects Brașov with Baia Mare and Satu Mare.

== Demographics ==
Historical population
Year	Pop.	±%
1880	3,568	—
1900	4,367	+22.4%
1910	4,723	+8.2%
1930	4,825	+2.2%
1956	5,316	+10.2%
1977	6,159	+15.9%
1992	5,151	−16.4%
2002	5,591	+8.5%
2011	6,000	+7.3%
2021	6,642	+10.7%
Source: Census data

At the 2021 census, Recea had a population of 6,642, of which 87.83% were Romanians, 2.66% Hungarians, and 1.1% Roma. At the 2011 census, the commune had 6,000 inhabitants, of which 94.5% were Romanians, 4.1% Hungarians, and 1.2% Roma.

== Natives ==
- Vasile Lucaci (born 1969), rugby union player and coach

== Sports ==
CS Academica Recea is an amateur Romanian football club based in the commune. The home ground for this club (and for the women's football club ACS Fotbal Feminin Baia Mare) is Stadionul Central, which opened in 2018.
