= National Union from Banat =

The National Union from Banat (Romanian: Uniunea Națională din Banat, UNB) was a regionalist political party in Romania, led by Avram Imbroane.

== History ==
In the 1919 elections it won four seats in the Chamber of Deputies. However, it did not contest any further elections.

== Electoral history ==
=== Legislative elections ===
Election	Votes	%	Assembly	Senate	Position
1919			4 / 568	0 / 216	14th
