= Yevhen Kozak =

Ukrainian philologist from Romania (1857–1933)

- Євген Оксентійович Козак

Member of the Senate of Romania
- In office 1922–1924

Member of the Diet of Bukovina
- In office 1911–1918

Personal details
- Born: December 21, 1857 Slobodzia-Banilla, Duchy of Bukovina, Austrian Empire
- Died: September 5, 1933 (aged 75) Cernăuți, Kingdom of Romania
- Citizenship: Austria-Hungary; Kingdom of Romania
- Party: People's Party
- Education: Chernivtsi University; University of Vienna
- Occupation: Politician, linguist, translator, academic

Yevhen Oksentiiovych Kozak (Ukrainian: Євген Оксентійович Козак; Romanian: Eugen A. Kozak; December 21, 1857 – 5 September 1933) was a Ukrainian scholar, linguist, religious, political and public figure, and rector of Chernivtsi University.

== Biography ==
In 1878, he graduated from the gymnasium in Chernivtsi (Czernowitz/Cernăuți). He entered the Faculty of Theology and the Faculty of Philosophy at Chernivtsi University. In 1886, he studied at the University of Vienna, where he pursued Slavic philology. On 18 December 1891, he obtained a doctorate in philosophy.

From 1892 to 1893, he served as a priest at the Serbian Church of St. Sava in Vienna.

In 1896, he was transferred to the Bukovinian Archdiocese. He worked as a priest-administrator in the villages of Verenchanka (1896) and Dobrynivtsi (1897–1898). In the same time, he wrote translated works from Romanian to German.

In 1899, he became a professor and head of the Department of Church Slavonic Language and Literature at Chernivtsi University. From 1907 to 1908, he served as rector of Chernivtsi University. Between 1919 and 1920, he was head of the Department of Slavic Studies at the same university.

He died on 5 September 1933 in Chernivtsi (then part of the Kingdom of Romania, now in Ukraine). His funeral was attended by family, friends, clerics, professors and government officials.

== Public activity ==
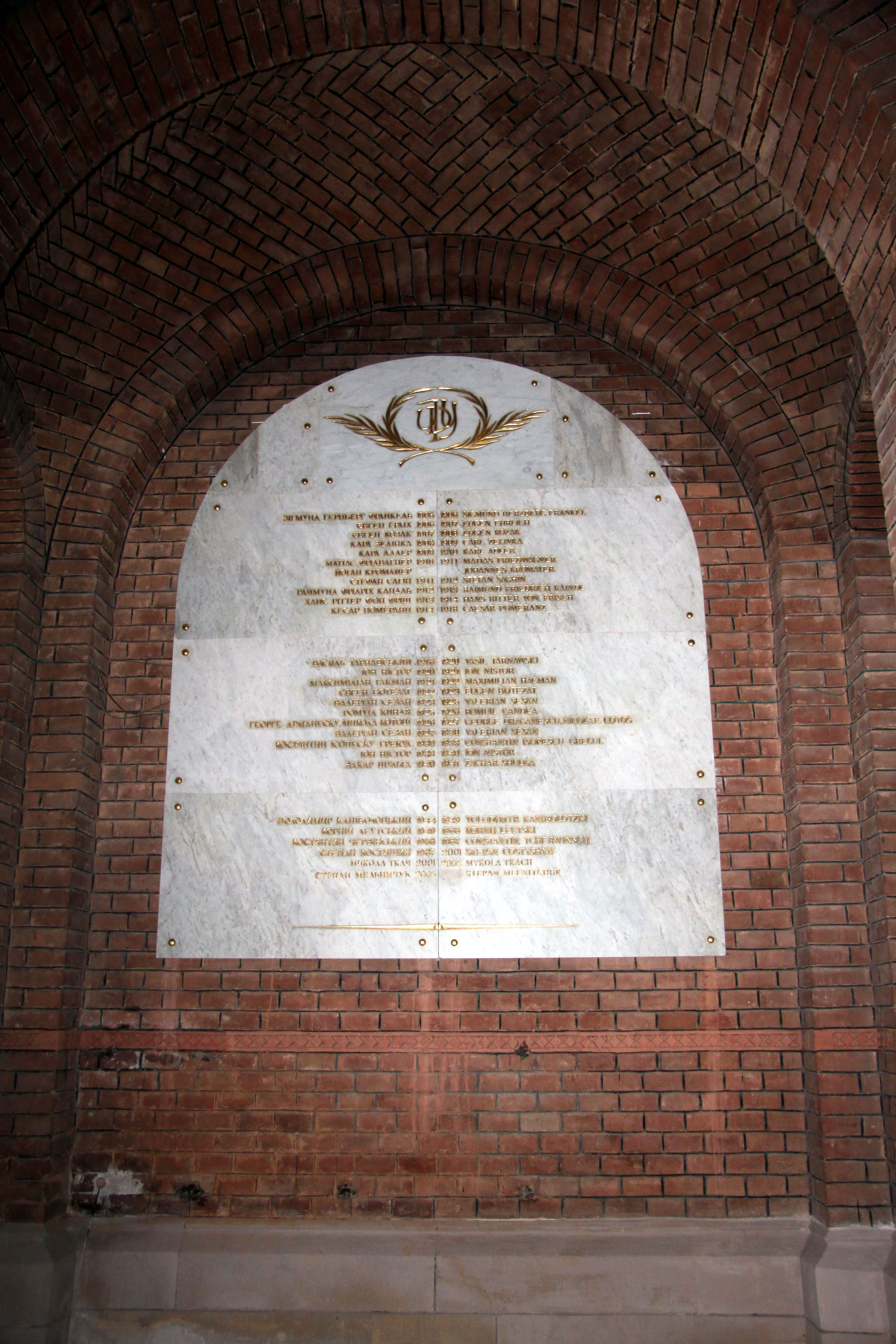
Plaque dedicated to the rectors of the University of Chernivtsi, also mentioning Yevhen Kozak

While studying at the Chernivtsi Gymnasium, he participated in the first Ruthenian youth society Soglasie, which was active in Bukovina.

Between 1875 and 1886, he was involved in the first Bukovina Ukrainian academic society Soyuz.

Kozak contributed to the journals Pravoslavnaya Bukovina (1893–1906) and Bukovynski Vydomosti (1895–1909). He was also chairman of the Russian Orthodox People’s Home society.

In 1911, he was elected to the Bukovinian State Diet as a representative of the Old Ruthenians.

During the First World War, he was exiled by the Austrian authorities to Salzburg. After the union of Bukovina with Romania, he was not reelected in the Senate of the University. He retired from his professorship at Chernivtsi University in 1921. From 1922 to 1924, he served as a senator in the Romanian Parliament representing the Kitsman (Cozmeni) electoral district.
