= Babyn =

Village in Chernivtsi Oblast, Ukraine

Coordinates: 48°38′42″N 25°37′31″E

Babyn (Ukrainian: Бабин; Romanian: Babin) is a village in Chernivtsi Raion, Chernivtsi Oblast, Ukraine. It belongs to Verenchanka rural hromada, one of the hromadas of Ukraine.

Until 18 July 2020, Babyn belonged to Zastavna Raion. The raion was abolished in July 2020 as part of the administrative reform of Ukraine, which reduced the number of raions of Chernivtsi Oblast to three. The area of Zastavna Raion was merged into Chernivtsi Raion.

Between 1918 and 1940 and then again from 1941 to 1944, it was part of the Kingdom of Romania, being the northernmost settlement in the country in both instances.
