= Vladimir Bodescu =

Bessarabian politician and lawyer (1868–1941)

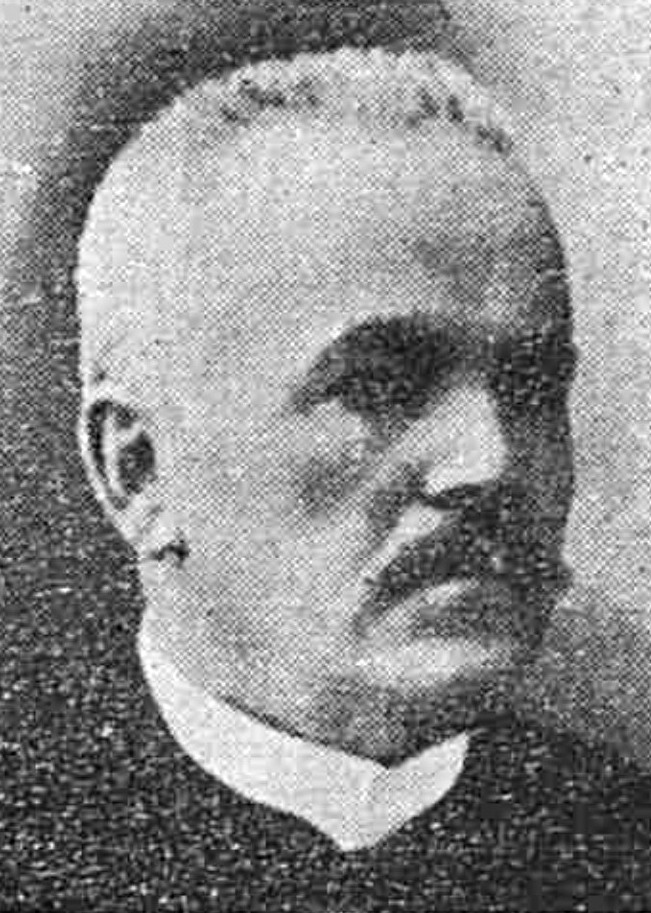
- Romanian politician Vladimir Bodescu, member of the Parliamendt of the Moldovan Democratic Republic - (1917-1918)

Member of the Moldovan Parliament
- In office 1917–1918

Personal details
- Born: 4 March 1868 Durleşti
- Died: 28 November 1941 (aged 73) Chistopol

Vladimir Bodescu (4 March 1868, Durleşti village, Russian Empire – 28 November 1941, Gulag, penitentiary No. 4, in Chistopol, TASSR) was a Bessarabian politician and lawyer who was part of the Moldovan Parliament from Bessarabia. He was one of the many victims of Soviet communism.

== Biography ==
=== Education, Sfatul Țării ===
He was a graduate of the law faculty of Kiev, being a lawyer. He was a magistrate in several localities in Russia, a prosecutor at the General Prosecutor's Office in Chișinău. Member of the Labor Party. He served as Member of the Moldovan Parliament (1917–1918). On 27 March 1918 he voted for the Union of Bessarabia with Romania.

=== Victim of Soviet Communism ===
He was arrested on 10 August 1940, after occupying Bessarabia by the USSR. He died of exhaustion in 1941.

== Gallery ==
Moldovan stamp, 1998

== Bibliography ==
- Gheorghe E. Cojocaru, Sfatul Țării: itinerar, Civitas, Chişinău, 1998, ISBN 9975-936-20-2
- Mihai Taşcă, Sfatul Țării şi actualele autorităţi locale, "Timpul de dimineaţă", no. 114 (849), June 27, 2008 (page 16)
