= Kuštilj =

Kuštilj Куштиљ (Serbian) Coștei (Romanian)
- Village (Selo)
- Location of Kuštilj within Serbia Kuštilj (Serbia) Kuštilj (Europe)
- Coordinates: 45°02′04″N 21°22′23″E
- Country: Serbia
- Province: Vojvodina
- District: South Banat
- Municipality: Vršac
- Elevation: 74 m (243 ft)

Population (2022)
  - Total: 522
- Time zone: UTC+1 (CET)
  - Summer (DST): UTC+2 (CEST)
- Postal code: 26336
- Area code: +381(0)13
- Car plates: VŠ

Kuštilj (Serbian Cyrillic: Куштиљ; Romanian: Coștei; Hungarian: Mélykastély) is a village located in the administrative area of the City of Vršac, South Banat District, Vojvodina, Serbia. The village has a population of 522 people (2022 census).

Kuštilj features a bust of the Romanian national poet Mihai Eminescu, erected by Romanian sculptor Dumitru Pasima in 1993.

== Demographics ==
=== Historical population ===
- 1961: 1‚596
- 1971: 1,416
- 1981: 1,189
- 1991: 1,082
- 2002: 806
- 2022: 522

=== Ethnic groups ===
According to data from the 2022 census, ethnic groups in the village include:

- 477 (91.3%) Romanians
- 21 (4%) Serbs
- Others/Undeclared/Unknown

== See also ==
- List of places in Serbia
- List of cities, towns and villages in Vojvodina
