= Vasile Lucaci =

Romania international rugby union player

- Born: 5 January 1969 (age 57) Recea, Romania

Rugby union career
- Position: Prop
- Current team: retired
International career
Years	Team	Apps	(Points)
- Romania
Coaching career
- Years: Team
- CSM Baia Mare

Vasile Ioan Lucaci (born 5 January 1969) is a former Romanian rugby union player and currently one of CSM Baia Mare's coaches. He played as a prop.

== International career ==
Lucaci was a member of Romania for the third Rugby World Cup held in 1995.
