= George Diamandy =

Romanian politician, dramatist, social scientist and archeologist (1867 - 1917)

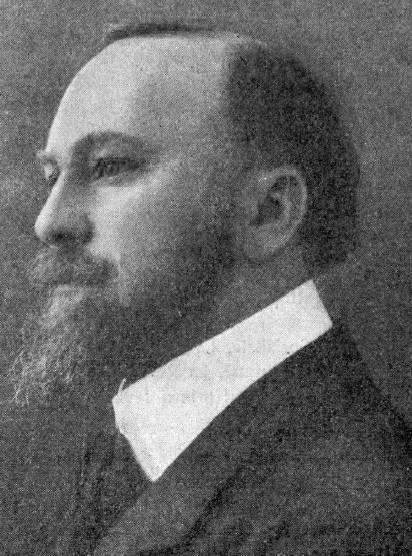
- Diamandy in or around 1912
- Born: February 27, 1867; Idrici or Bârlad
- Died: December 27, 1917 (aged 50); North Sea, off Shetland
- Occupations: politician, social scientist, journalist, diplomat, landowner
- Writing career
- Pen name: Georges Diamandy, Giorgio Diamandy, Gh. Despina, Ion Marvila, Ne om
- Period: ca. 1887–1916
- Genres: essay, diary, drama, fantasy literature, comédie en vaudeville, novella, travel literature
- Movement: Naturalism

George Ion Diamandy or Diamandi, first name also Gheorghe or Georges (February 27, 1867 – December 27, 1917), was a Romanian politician, dramatist, social scientist, and archeologist. Although a rich landowner of aristocratic background, he was one of the pioneers of revolutionary socialism in France and Romania, obtaining international fame as founder of L'Ère Nouvelle magazine. He was an early affiliate of the Romanian Social-Democratic Workers' Party, but grew disenchanted with its radical policies, and, as a member of its "generous youth" faction, played a major part in dissolving it. With other members of this reformist group, he joined the National Liberal Party, serving as one of its representatives in Chamber.

Affected by heart disease from childhood, Diamandy had to maintain a low profile in politics, but was a vocal marginal within the National Liberal establishment. From 1910, he invested his energy in literature and cultural activism, chairing the National Theatre Bucharest and later the Romanian Writers' Society. He was pushed back to the forefront during the early stages World War I, when he supported an alliance with the Entente Powers. He advised Premier Ion I. C. Brătianu on the matter and was sent on diplomatic missions to the West, helping to cement France's trust for Romania. He fought in the ill-fated campaign of 1916, and withdrew to Iași, retaking his seat in Chamber.

During his final years, Diamandy became an advocate of democratic socialism, founding the Iași-based Labor Party and seeking the friendship of Russian Esers. The October Revolution caught him in Russia, but he escaped by way of Arkhangelsk, and died at sea while attempting to reach France.

George Diamandy was the brother and collaborator of diplomat Constantin I. Diamandy, and the posthumous grandfather of writer Oana Orlea. He is largely forgotten as a dramatist, but endures in cultural memory for his controversial politics and his overall eccentricity.

== Biography ==
=== Early life ===
George Diamandy, the son of landowner Ion "Iancu" Diamandy and Cleopatra Catargiu, was born in Idrici, Vaslui County, or, by his own admission, in Bârlad. Several sources, including Diamandy's own account, give his birth date as February 27, 1867 (George Călinescu, the literary historian, has October 27). His brother, Constantin "Costică", was born in 1870. Constantin and George also had a sister, Margareta, later married Popovici-Tașcă.

The Diamandys, of Greek origins, had made a slow climb into the aristocracy of Moldavia and, later, the Kingdom of Romania. One branch of the family, who used the name variant Emandi, produced diplomat Theodor Emandi. Iancu rose to high office, serving in Parliament and as Prefect of Tutova County. His wife Cleopatra belonged to the higher realms of the boyar aristocracy, and according to politician-memoirist Constantin Argetoianu, had passed her "pride" and "airs" to both her sons.

George, who always spoke Romanian with a thick and archaic Moldavian accent, was first enlisted in school at Bârlad. However, having been infected with malaria, he had to spend much of his childhood taking seaside cures in France. He then returned to study at the United Institutes High School in Iași, where he notably put out a clandestine student magazine, Culbecul ("The Snail"). As noted by Călinescu, he was "absent-minded and rebellious." According to his own account, he was "mediocre", but "read extensively outside the curriculum". He disliked the school and claimed that it gave him rheumatism and heart problems.

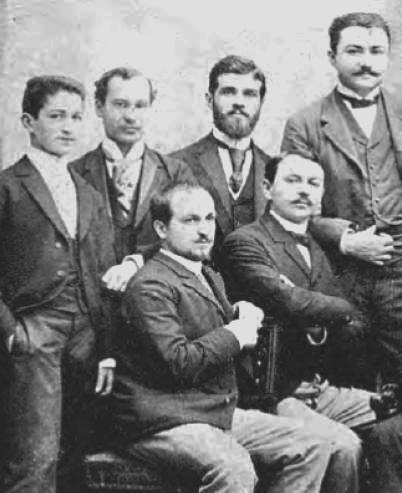
George Diamandy (first from the left, seated) and brother Constantin (standing behind him), in an 1890 photograph

His life course was changed by his discovery of socialism and proletarian internationalism, and he soon became their avid promoter. His brother had entirely different opinions in this respect, calling socialism "a farce". George and his best friend Arthur Gorovei founded their own Socialist Club, which only lasted a few days. Diamandy also published political articles in the review Contemporanul (the first one in 1887), following up with similar contributions to Munca and Raicu Ionescu-Rion's Critica Socială. He neglected his schoolwork and, in his own words, passed his Baccalaureate "more than anything because the professors were generous".

Diamandy also developed a passion for archeology, enjoying in particular the books of Gabriel de Mortillet and Theodor Mommsen. He camped out with Nicolae Beldiceanu in Cucuteni, where he helped on the inventory of the Cucuteni-Trypillian culture. Diamandy was also a member of the Bârlad National Romanian Committee, which gathered funds and artifacts for the Romanian delegation to the 1889 Exposition Universelle. He was working on a novel in the manner of Émile Zola, which, according to Gorovei, was over-detailed and boring.

Upon graduation, Diamandy volunteered for service in the Romanian Land Forces, spending a year and a half as an artillery man. Disliked because of his pranks ("which I for one found spirited"), he was moved to the 7th Artillery Regiment in Călărași, and, because once there he complained about the mistreatment of regulars by the officers, spent several months in the disciplinary barracks. He notes: "Just as I was ending my term as a volunteer, the captain, having learned that I had donned a civilian's outfit for a private party, ordered me in lockdown.—Lockdown meant no stove and no windows, so that's how I ended up with pneumonia."

=== L'Ère Nouvelle ===
Diamandy went on to study Law at the University of Paris, but did very poorly, and was only granted half of his license; he completed the rest at Caen University. He pursued other scholarly interests, becoming a corresponding member of the Société Anthropologique. He published notices on Cucuteni, as well as studies on Bulgarian handicrafts and a sketch of Romanian anthropological criminology. He also completed, in 1891, the historical demography tract Dépopulation et repeuplement de la France ("The Depopulation and Repopulation of France"). In parallel, he resumed his work in political journalism, with articles published in Le Journal, La Petite République, La Justice, Le Socialiste, and L'Art Social.

Taking over for the Romanian "revolutionary socialist" cell founded by Mircea and Vintilă Rosetti, he joined the "internationalist revolutionary student group" of the Latin Quarter, presided upon by Alexandre Zévaès. He was one of its delegates to the 1891 International Socialist Labor Congress in Brussels. According to his own account, he presided over the Congress proceedings. In December of that year, Diamandy sided with Zévaès' moderate leadership against the radical revolutionary minority. The next year, in May, having been elected President of the student group, he was also delegated to the socialist feminist congress, where he obtained a nominal submission of socialist women to the program of a future internationalist party. He and fellow Romanian expatriate Emil Racoviță were present at the Socialist and Labor Congress, convened at Zürich in 1893.

On July 1, 1893, Diamandy published the first issue of a "monthly for scientific socialism", L'Ère Nouvelle ("The New Era"). It viewed itself as both a literary and a sociological review: dedicated to promoting literary naturalism and historical materialism, openly provoking the reading public to explore the work of Zola, it attacked the "reactionary" critics. It also proudly called itself "eclectic". L'Ère Nouvelle hosted articles by Marxist thinkers from the various countries of Europe: primarily Friedrich Engels and Paul Lafargue, but also Georgi Plekhanov, Clara Zetkin, Karl Kautsky, Jean Jaurès, Gabriel Deville, and Jules Guesde. Its regular contributors included Constantin Dobrogeanu-Gherea, the Romanian Marxist doyen, Duc-Quercy, the French strike organizer, with the additional presence of Racoviță, Zévaès, Victor Jaclard, Alexandre Millerand, Adolphe Tabarant, Ilya Rubanovich, and Ioan Nădejde; Leó Frankel was the editorial secretary.

Also featured in the review, Georges Sorel was a senior syndicalist with Marxist leanings, not affiliated with either Guesde's French Workers' Party (POF) or Millerand's smaller socialist circle. Diamandy and Lafargue encouraged him to extend his forays into critical social history. According to Sorel's own claim, his presence there was only made possible when non-revolutionary French socialists like Millerand had decided to boycott L'Ère Nouvelle.

Diamandy's magazine was poorly reviewed by the sociological establishment: writing for the Revue Internationale de Sociologie, André Voisin censured its "violence" and its "quite glaring partiality", but noted that some of the sociological pieces were "at the very least moderate in form". Sorel himself recalled: "G. Diamandy [...] was at the time a ferociously orthodox Marxist [...]. He spent more time in the taverns of Montmartre than at University. He was a jolly good chap, entirely unreliable. I kept seeing him after that time, he was still in Mortmartre, and seemingly heading toward alcoholism." Reportedly, Diamandy was pulling pranks and farces on his socialist colleagues, even during their public functions.

However, the publication itself had a significant, if indirect, impact on the French Left. Diamandy proudly noted that it was "France's first Marxist magazine". As historian Leslie Derfler writes, it was "the first theoretical journal in France" and an answer to Die Neue Zeit; for Sorel's disciples, it also signified a turn toward a "more authentic" and "Latin" Marxism. As Sorel himself indicated a while after, this meant a split with orthodox Marxism, for the sake of "renewal". Diamandy unwittingly enticed the conflicts between Sorel and the POF when he wrote in L'Ère Nouvelle that, according to Guesde, one need not have read Marx to become a Marxist.

=== PSDMR ===
L'Ère Nouvelle only survived for a few months, publishing its final issue in November 1894, before closing down in early 1895. According to Sorel, Diamandy simply "disappeared, leaving his magazine stranded". Still, Diamandy managed to exert his direct influence over many other Romanian socialist students in France, from Racoviță and Nădejde to Alexandru Radovici, Constantin Garoflid, Deodat Țăranu, Dimitrie Voinov, and Ioan Cantacuzino. Diamandy was part of a new magazine, Le Devenir social (1895-1896).

Diamandy personally sponsored the emerging socialist movement in the Kingdom of Romania. On his trips back to the country, he was welcomed as a celebrity at the socialist-run Sotir Hall, Bucharest, before affiliating with the Romanian Social-Democratic Workers' Party (PSDMR). This Marxist group was supportive of the mainstream National Liberal Party (PNL), as the latter had promised the introduction of universal male suffrage. At the 2nd PSDMR Congress in April 1894, Diamandy and Vasile Morțun had successfully campaigned for the introduction of such electoral demands into the party statute. When the PNL came to power and refused to follow through with its promise, a PSDMR faction agitated in favor of the opposition Conservative Party, even though the latter was explicitly right-wing. Writing for Munca, Diamandy endorsed this view, suggesting that references to the PNL's progressivism be dropped from PSDMR's statute.

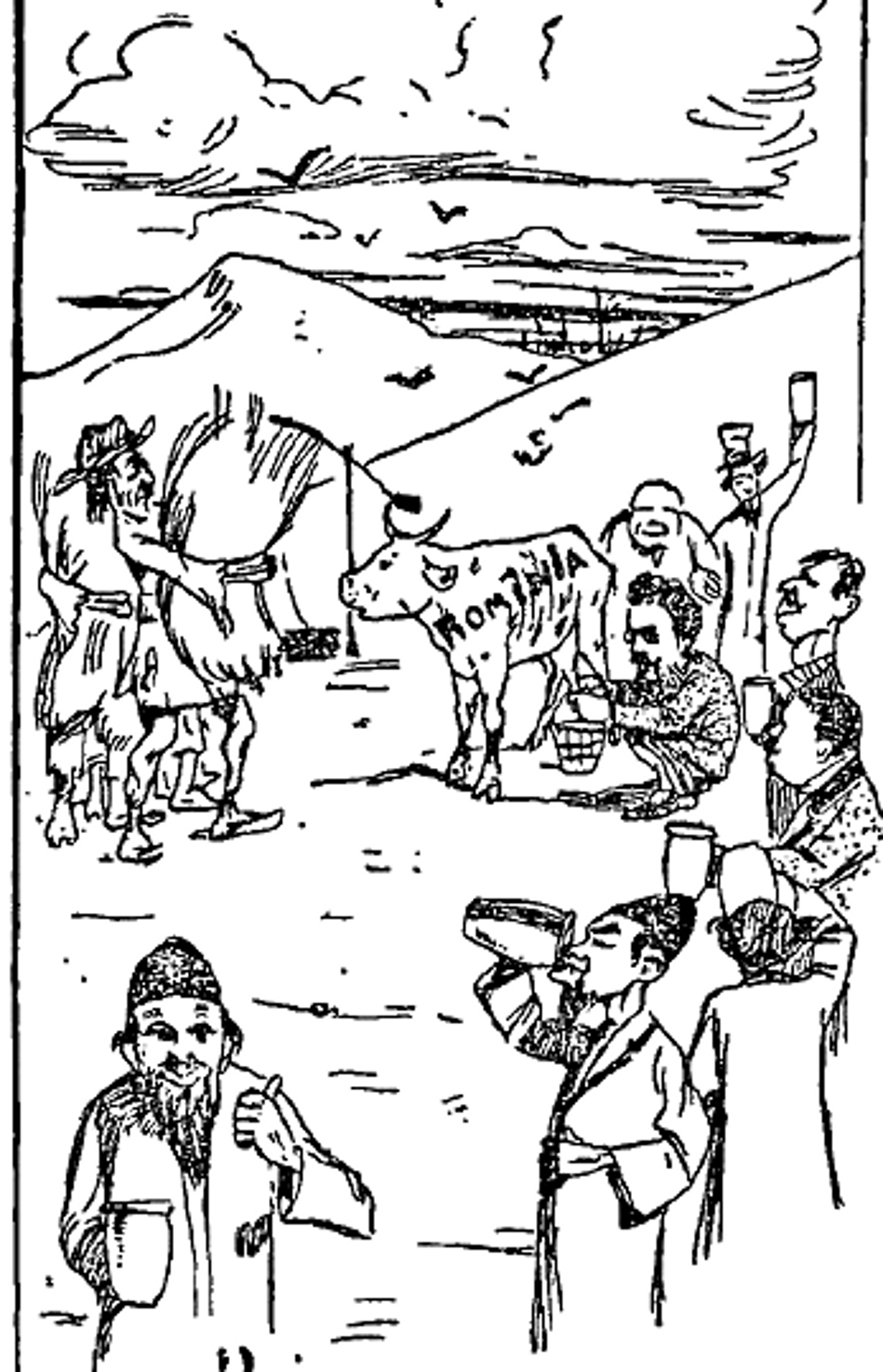
The "Sotir Hall Ideal", satirized by the antisemitic press (May 1896): socialists and Jewish Romanians milking a cow stamped "Romania", which is fed by an overworked peasant

In partnership with Garabet Ibrăileanu, Diamandy edited for a while the PSDMR organ, Lumea Nouă, exploring the possibility of returning to his home country. At Lumea Nouă, he put out a brochure on Doctrina și tactica socialistă ("Socialist Doctrine and Tactics"). Involved with the PSDMR chapter in Brăila, he presented himself as a candidate in the parliamentary election of 1895, but lost. In 1898, he submitted to Romanian authorities the project of a "Romanian anthropological exhibition" at the 1900 Exposition Universelle.

Following his father's death in 1898, Diamandy made his definitive return to Romania. By this time, the PSDMR was already showing the signs of a split into reformist, agrarian, and orthodox-Marxist camps. Diamandy was present at secretive meetings between PSDMR founders and the agrarian group of Ion Th. Banghereanu. Also present was Constantin Stere, the PSDMR's link with a left-leaning faction of the PNL, under Ion I. C. Brătianu. The reformists, distrustful of Banghereanu's sustained effort to spread socialism in rural areas, pushed for a schism: Morțun, Radovici, and, after a while, Diamandy himself, proposed that the entire PSDMR leadership leave the party and become PNL members.

As Diamandy notes, the conflict became a "grave disagreement", and led him to suspend himself from the party and return to Paris. It deepened when the PNL Premier, Dimitrie Sturdza, ordered Banghereanu's arrest on charges of sedition. Socialism was also threatened from within by disputes over Jewish emancipation, which polarized the PSDMR between antisemitism and Jewish nationalism. Diamandy witnessed a violent dispute in Iași, where, he claimed, the Jewish Romanian affiliates had been heard shouting "Down with the Romanians!" The antisemitic campaign was allegedly stoked by the PNL government, which sought to prove that the peasant agitation was a Jewish affair.

=== "Generous youth" ===
The moderate leadership continued to support PNL policies, even with Banghereanu jailed. At the 6th PSDMR Congress of April 1899, Diamandy and Morțun presented a motion to transform the party into a more moderate unit, called "National Democratic" or "Progressive Democratic". According to labor historian Constantin Titel Petrescu, the Congress was a sham, with many important activists absent, and with Jewish members stripped of their voting privileges, on Diamandy's own initiative. In his own view, Diamandy was still persuaded that "intransigent" socialism could eventually work in Romania, and considered methods to prolong the PSDMR's survival. Speaking at the Congress, he warned that the PSDMR was already an "anti-Marxist" group dedicated to a "top-down revolution", which had only managed to set up "a socialist general staff", and could not claim to have improved the workers' lives. The alternative, he argued, was class collaboration, which meant attracting "into our ranks all better elements of the bourgeoisie".

The most outspoken opponents of "National Democratic" plan were C. Z. Buzdugan, Alexandru Ionescu and I. C. Frimu, representatives of the urban underclass, who saw this as an "attack" against the PSDMR's Marxist credentials. Buzdugan claimed that Diamandy had expunged the very notion of class conflict from his readings of Marxism. He himself stretched the meaning of "proletariat" to cover not just the minor class of industrial workers, but also the mass of "landless peasants"; their interests, Buzdugan concluded, could only be served by a "workers' party". Many of those who opted for a "workers' party" resigned, while Diamandy's supporters announced that a new conference in June 1899 would transform theirs into a "sincerely democratic party".

The April Congress effectively destroyed the PSDMR. Diamandy, Morțun and their followers, collectively referred to as "the generous youth", resigned and joined the PNL. The PSDMR that survived through June was an informal political club, whose members included Buzdugan, Ionescu, and Panait Zosin. In later socialist historiography, this schism was seen as a victory for Stere and his Poporanist faction, who redirected the leftist vote toward the PNL. According to cultural historian Z. Ornea, the "generous youth" so efficiently adapted itself to the new environment, and Stere so poorly, that the rumor should be discounted. Diamandy himself was dismissive of his contribution: "I entered the ranks of the liberal party, where I played a most silent and irrelevant part".

Following the Hallier Affair, which tarnished the reputation of governing Conservatives, Diamandy took part in the unauthorized demonstrations which were broken up by Police. He registered with the 3rd Electoral College, hoping to represent the peasants of Tutova County. Finally elected to the Chamber (Assembly) of Deputies in the 1901 race, which returned the PNL to power, Diamandy challenged Petre P. Carp, the outgoing Premier, to an oratorical duel in Chamber, over the issue of deficit spending.

At around that time, he married Ștefania (or Safta), the daughter of Dumitru Simionescu-Râmniceanu. The latter was related by marriage to writer Duiliu Zamfirescu, and a probable inspiration for the avaricious and power-hungry characters in Zamfirescu's novels. Diamandy inherited from Simionescu-Râmniceanu the large estate of Sascut, but also a conflict over land with the local peasants. In May 1904, the local authorities stepped in to evacuate villagers who were demonstrating on Diamandy's property. The conflict was later investigated by Gorovei, the agricultural inspector for Tutova. He claims that Diamandy exploited his workers and broke all legislation.

Diamandy's status as a rich estate owner left an enduring mark on his contemporaries. Historians and commentators made note of his eccentricity: Nicolae Iorga remembered Diamandy's "old socialism" as "a seigniorial adventure", while Eugen Lovinescu simply noted that Diamandy's aristocratic airs were "incorrigible". Also according to Lovinescu, Diamandy was "a late-comer" among enthusiastic Francophiles, one whose "mind continued to live in Paris". Călinescu describes him as "an amateurish and sumptuous proletarian". The same was later stated by Lucian Boia, who mentions Diamandy as a "picturesque figure" and "perfect Francophile", while noting his activity among the "salon left".

=== PNL dissident ===
Diamandy's socialist background and dealings with the Brătianu faction brought him to the forefront during the 1907 Peasants' Revolt: the fourth Sturdza cabinet, brought in to deal with the rebellion, resorted to handing out seats to Brătianu's circle, the Poporanists, and the "generous youth" alike. Diamandy was appointed Prefect of a war zone, Tecuci County, with specific orders that he was not to use the Land Forces against the peasants. He resigned in short while, citing health reasons. As he put it, in 1912: "It was during the revolts that I contracted infectious influenza, which is still killing me about 6 times each year. The sedentary life that comes with disease is what pushed me to writing, and thus, out of boredom and being exasperated with my disease, I began collaborating with [the National Liberal newspapers] Voința Națională and Viitorul."

The interval also prompted him to work on a fictionalized diary, Ne om ("No Man"), which records his anxiety in front of disease and impending doom. It saw print in 1908, with the editorial branch of L'Indépendance Roumaine daily. He had a prolific activity as a publicist, with articles in the central press, but also with political brochures that he signed using various pseudonyms—Gh. Despina, Ion Marvila, and Ne om. Following the 1907 election, reconfirmed as deputy, Diamandy and the other "generous" parliamentarians became key players in the transition from a Sturdza cabinet to the first of seven Brătianu administrations. When it came about, in 1908, it was largely seen by the Conservatives as a covert socialist government, not least of all because of ambiguous statements made by Stere and Diamandy.

The fear of radicalized socialism peaked in December 1909, when Brătianu was attacked and wounded by Gheorghe Stoenescu, a deranged worker with anarchist sympathies. The opposition asked Diamandy and Ioan Nădejde to clarify whether they were still Marxists; they confirmed that they still viewed themselves as dialectical materialists, explaining their perspective as a kind of "Darwinism". Diamandy gave his endorsement to Stere's project of land reform, which was resisted by the Conservatives, as well as by Brătianu and Nădejde.

Diamandy also believed it necessary to criticize the PNL from within. According to a 1911 retrospective in Noua Revistă Română, he proved himself "an enfant terrible of our politics": "He kept on admonishing Mr. Brătianu, even though it was him who had given him an eligible deputy seat. It was either that Mr. Brătianu is not democratic enough; or that Mr. Brătianu cannot organize his own party; neither of these seemed to please Mr. Diamandy. And Mr. Diamandy would always make sure to voice his opinion at the most inappropriate times."

In 1910, Diamandy published his first works in drama: a four-act play, Tot înainte ("Carry On"), and a "dramatic sketch", Bestia ("The Beast"). The latter was produced by the National Theatre Bucharest, with Maria Filotti in the central role, and attracted much attention with its "daring subject". Diamandy did not join the Romanian Writers' Society, objecting to its antisemitism, and suggesting, in a letter to Noua Revistă Română, that the professional association had admitted talentless authors. In articles he wrote for Facla and Semnalul newspapers, Diamandy openly advocated Jewish emancipation, against nationalist objections.

=== Revista Democrației Române ===
In 1910, Diamandy founded the weekly Revista Democrației Române ("Review of Romanian Democracy"), which, as a cultural and sociological venture, suggested a program of ethnographic studies in the Romanian villages, and printed an edition of Bestia. Politically, Revista Democrației Române coagulated inner-PNL dissidence, accusing Brătianu of having turned reactionary. It hosted Diamandy's thoughts about reforming the 1866 Constitution: although he no longer demanded universal suffrage, he still saw it as a historical necessity farther down the line. Also featured was his maverick proposal to merge the breakaway Conservative-Democratic Party, a junior ally, into the PNL. These ideas were derided by the Conservative-Democrats at Noua Revistă Română, who also noted that Diamandy's proposals were conspicuously serving the politically insignificant "generous youth".

Stere and the "generous ones" were noted contributors to the magazine, as were Constantin Banu, Ioan Bianu, Gheorghe Gh. Mârzescu, Constantin Alimănișteanu, Ioan Alexandru Brătescu-Voinești, and some of the committed Marxists. Outside this circle, Diamandy found himself isolated on the political scene, and was no longer proposed for an eligible seat in the elections of 1911, presenting a full report on his activities to his Tutova constituents. Revista Democrației Române survived until 1912, by which time Diamandy had decided to stay away from political journalism, "since I only see fit to write as my conscience tells me to".

Another of his plays, Dolorosa, was taken up by the National Theater in 1911. The same year, Diamandy prefaced the collected works of a deceased socialist poet, Ion Păun-Pincio. By 1912, when his political satire Rațiunea de stat ("The Reason of State") was published in Flacăra review and taken up by Comoedia Troupe, Diamandy had been elected President of the Romanian Theatrical Society. However, Diamandy complained that his works were ignored by the National Theater, despite good referrals from writers Iacob Negruzzi and Zamfirescu. Alongside Radu D. Rosetti, he formed a Literary Circle at the rival Comoedia. Eventually joining the Writers' Society in 1911, he left it in 1913, but returned by popular demand in 1914.

Diamandy bought himself a yacht, Spargeval ("Breakwave"), and sailed the Black Sea coast, writing on other plays. Soon, his attention focused on the "Eastern Question". In 1910, he returned from an extended trip through the Ottoman Empire, which is recorded in his travelogue, Impressions de Turquie. On his way through Babadag, a traditional Turkish-and-Islamic center in Romania, Diamandy refurbished the local Tekke, planting a new votive inscription over the tomb of Gazi Ali.

Turning to nationalism during the Second Balkan War, Diamandy gave morale-supporting lectures to infantrymen of the Land Forces, having already prefaced a textbook of military pedagogy, by Colonel Gheorghe Șuer. In June 1913, he also wrote the foreword to a social geography tract by Major G. A. Dabija. The work as a whole was probably the first in history to justify Romania's colonization of Southern Dobruja, formerly in the Kingdom of Bulgaria. As later noted by Dabija, Diamandy's "unofficial" penmanship was required to divert attention from this being the expansionist policy of a Conservative government.

=== National Theater Director ===
In 1913, under a PNL government headed by Ion I. C. Brătianu, Culture Minister Ion G. Duca appointed Diamandy Director of the National Theater. As Duca would claim in his memoirs, this was only "to fulfill one of [Diamandy's] dreams"—Diamandy, Duca writes, had "an incorrigible mania for being or seeming original." He was only National Theater director for a few months, being replaced by his Revista Democrației Române colleague Brătescu-Voinești before the end of the 1913–1914 season; he returned for a second term later in 1914.

The time he spent in office only served to aggravate his colleagues in the theatrical business. One of them, Ioan Massoff, recalled that Diamandy had made a habit of citing his heart troubles to avoid seeing any of his subordinates, simply dictating his reform-minded wishes to them by proxy. Reportedly, Diamandy sacked the actor Vasile Leonescu for spite: Leonescu had criticized Rațiunea de stat as "unworthy of being staged by Romania's top venue." Another actor, Ion Livescu, recalled that, although "an enlightened democrat", and "well inspired" in his choices for the repertoire, Diamandy played the part of an authoritarian, and only communicated through his secretary, Marin Simionescu-Râmniceanu. However, Livescu believes that Diamandy had good cause to ignore complaints and avoid quarrels.

By that stage in his career, Diamandy was contemplating the creation of a Romanian "People's Theater" for the benefit of peasants, the news of which sparked ridicule in the urban press. His own work for the stage underwent a change of style: also in 1914, he published in Flacăra the localized "heroic comedy" Chemarea codrului ("Call of the Woods"), written in the format of a comédie en vaudeville. It premiered at his own National Theater, with Filotti as the female lead, and was an instant favorite of the public. The fantasy format of the play satisfied Diamandy, who went on to publish other plays and dramatic fragments: Strună cucoane ("Hold on, Sire"), Hămăiță ("Barker"), Regina Lia ("Queen Lia"), and the libretto for a children's opera, Gheorghiță Făt-Frumos ("Gheorghiță Prince Charming"), set to music by Alfons Castaldi.

After the outbreak of World War I, Romania opted to preserve her neutrality, with public opinion divided between Francophile and Germanophile groups, respectively supportive of the Entente countries and the Central Powers. Francophilia showed up in his articles for various literary and political reviews, including his one-time contribution to Versuri și Proză magazine (September 1, 1914). This political stance was probably a factor in his 1914 election as president of the Writers' Society, as was his status as Theater manager. He combined both assignments, collecting grants for the writers through Theater benefits, and selling Romanian books through a special booth in the Theater's foyer.

Diamandy's mandate came to an end in August 1915, when he assigned his seat to Alexandru Mavrodi. As Livescu notes: "when it seemed to him that there would not be many people who could understand him [...], he put his hat on, and, having just lectured us so very passionately about that France of his, left us all, with a cold and jerky salute from the top of the stairs: 'Good day y'all!'"

=== World War I strategist and soldier ===
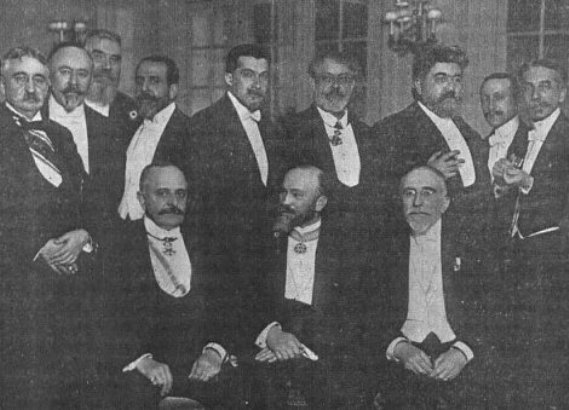
The Romanian delegation and its hosts in Paris, January 1915. Diamandy is seated, front row, center, between Ambassador Ioan Lahovary (to his left) and French historian Georges Lacour-Gáyet. Behind them, from left: Stéphen Pichon, Milenko Radomar Vesnić, Denys Cochin, Athos Romanos, Emil Costinescu, Jean Richepin, Ioan Cantacuzino, Joseph Aulneau, and Dimitar Stanchov.

Diamandy's enthusiasm for intervention was held back by reports that Romania risked going into war without proper weapons and ammunition. With this in mind, he and Constantin Istrati were sent to Italy by Premier Brătianu, and successfully negotiated a treaty of mutual assistance between the two neutral countries. He also visited traditionally-hostile Bulgaria, and claimed to have obtained assurances from Prime Minister Vasil Radoslavov that she would not join the Central Powers. His brother Constantin Diamandy, noted for his highly optimistic combative stance and his martial attire, became one of Brătianu's confidants. During his diplomatic missions, he had also informed the government, reassuringly, about the goings-on in Bulgaria, and acted as liaison with the Russian Empire.

For a while, Diamandy was affiliated with the trans-party "National Action", which, under Take Ionescu and Nicolae Filipescu, sought to bring Romania into the Entente. In January 1915, he was the group's envoy to France, but acted as an informal delegate for Brătianu. He was welcomed by the Franco–Romanian Friendship Committee and by Paul Deschanel personally. His erstwhile associate, Georges Sorel, commented that Deschanel must have been misinformed: "[Diamandy] must really be thinking that Paris is a capital for the rent-seekers, since now they take him seriously. If Romania had had an honest intent to strike a deal with us, it would have surely picked herself some other negotiator. Evidently P. Deschanel was not aware of Diamandy's character."

Diamandy also had a meeting with Raymond Poincaré, the President of France. He may have informed him about Radoslavov's promises, which Diamandy still took for granted, and which may explain Poincaré's overly confident support for Romania in later Entente conferences. However, the talk also covered the issue of Romania's grievances toward Russia, which still prevented her for entering the war. He introduced this enigma to Poincaré: "Romania looks forward to France's victory and to Russia's defeat" (see Franco-Russian Alliance). At one of the banquets in his honor, Diamandy divulged the existence of a parallel Franco–Romanian alliance, and stressed "that R[o]mania's entry into the war would result in the conflict's end."

Diamandy gave a public report on the world conflict and how it fit with Romania's national interest at the National Liberal Party Center of Studies. It was published, in 1916, with assistance from the Romanian Academy. The same year, he prefaced (as Giorgio Diamandy) Federico Valerio Ratti's monograph on "Latin Romania", published in Florence by I Libri d'Oggi. Other such pieces were taken up by various newspapers and magazines, including Universul, L'Indépendance Roumaine, and Rampa. He also put out a complete collection of his novellas.

Returning to Chamber after the 1914 elections, Diamandy participated in the heated sessions of December 1915. He voiced the mainstream opinion of the PNL in open disputes with the Conservative Petre P. Carp. He rejected Carp's fears that a victorious Russia looked set to occupy the Danube Delta, but also noted that he himself had reserves about bringing Romania into the war, and made public his resignation from the "National Action". This effectively returned him to the PNL's mainstream, where he continued to campaign in favor of going to war. Nevertheless, Diamandy also supported his former ally, Stere, who was being heckled by the other deputies for suggesting that an alliance against Russia was in Romania's benefit.

Eventually, in summer 1916, Premier Brătianu discarded his reservations, and Romania entered the war as an Entente country. While Constantin became tasked with ensuring a direct Russian military involvement and military aid for the Romanian Front, George again volunteered for military service. He was reputedly enrolled as a private, but was seen traveling with his own orderly. He was detached to the Second Army commandment in the Southern Carpathians, where he held conference with General Alexandru Averescu and other officers. Averescu remembered him as a shady figure, not worthy of his trust, and noted in particular Diamandy's ideas about using expanding bullets against the Austro-Hungarian Army (which had reportedly initiated their use in combat). Diamandy saw action in the front-line trenches, but was still plagued by his lung and heart problems, and was eventually sent to a hospital behind the lines. By then, the Diamandys' forecasts about Bulgarian neutrality and Romanian readiness for war proved misguided, with Romania suffering a scathing defeat in the Battle of Turtucaia.

=== Labor Party ===
After losing the Battle of Bucharest in December 1916, the Romanian Land Forces withdrew into Moldavia, which, with Russian help, they defended against renewed Central Powers offensives. Diamandy was also moved to Iași, the provisional capital, where Brătianu's government and the Parliament had relocated. He took back his Chamber seat, and, as the poor management of war weakened support for Brătianu, went on public record with his criticism.

The February Revolution in Russia reopened the path toward radical socializing reforms, and pushed Diamandy back into socialist politics. Brătianu promised land reform and a new electoral law, but Diamandy and other dissenting PNL-ists were not appeased: they claimed that the government had lost its "moral right" to apply such legislation, and obstructed it repeatedly. According to Duca's hostile account, the February Revolution gave Diamandy the illusion that time had come for him "to play a great role", and that the "tyrannical" Brătianu was an embarrassment for the Russian democracy. Duca also claims that, despite his "laughable exhibitions" in favor of land reform, Diamandy could never conceive of completely redistributing property from the landowners to the peasants.

By April 1917, Diamandy had formed his own parliamentary party, called Labor Party (Partidul Muncei). It had the radical agrarianist Nicolae L. Lupu for a co-chairman, with Grigore Iunian, Ioan Cantacuzino, Grigore Trancu-Iași, Constantin Ion Parhon, Mihail Macavei, Grigore Filipescu and Alexandru Slătineanu as regular members. Diamandy himself authored the central manifesto, published as a brochure. As Duca writes, the ailing dramatist was parading in a socialist's uniform: "a sort of Russian worker's blouse, his boots on, quite like an authentic comrade just arrived from some soviet". He was "evidently ridiculous", "acutely megalomaniac", driven to "a pathological state" by the urgency of his heart disease. The Minister of Agriculture, Gheorghe Gh. Mârzescu, was also disturbed by Diamandy's behavior, writing: "George Diamandi, thinking about ways to support the ideas of the Labor Party, born from personal ambitions stoked by the Russian revolution, imagined that he should necessarily show up in Chamber in Tolstoy's costume. This operetta thing is produced for the benefit of peasants."

In his private diaries, General Averescu recalls his meeting with an anxious King Ferdinand in the small town of Moinești. The monarch looked into "the growth of a socialist movement in our country", and had left Iași because "socialists and young liberals, under G. Diamandy, are supposedly in contact with the Russian revolutionaries". The account is also supported by Duca. According to him, Diamandy and Lupu had revived their contacts with the old socialists, as well as with Russian Esers, with whose backing they intended to set up a Romanian "democratic government"; their project for a revolution was bogged down when the "pragmatic" Russians discovered that the Labor Party was politically insignificant and "oligarchic". The Labor faction also branched into neighboring Bessarabia, using the revolutionary agent Ilie Cătărău for an emissary. Nevertheless, the Laborites supported the calls for order, reacting against Russian soldiers and Romanian civilians who demanded a "Romanian republic".

According to Arthur Gorovei, the Labor Party should be regarded as George Diamandy's "final prank". In June 1917, following the renewed offensive of the Central Powers, Diamandy became a refugee to Russia, where his brother Constantin was Romanian Ambassador. He was trapped on Russian territory during the October Revolution, events which his brother downplayed in his reports to Brătianu. The Revolution took Russia out of the war and signaled the start of a Russian–Romanian diplomatic war: Constantin was held in captivity by the Council of People's Commissars, and eventually expelled.

=== Death and aftermath ===
George Diamandy fled to the White Sea port of Arkhangelsk, where he embarked on the ship Kursk, bound for France. Kursk also transported some 3,000 returning members of the Czechoslovak Legion and some 300 French governesses. On the stormy night of December 27, 1917, off the coast of Shetland, Diamandy suffered a fatal attack of angina (or myocardial infarction). As noted by Călinescu: "his coffin was buried at sea, while a choir formed by hundreds of Czechs sang, as an homage."

Diamandy's death was received with indifference by the Germanophiles and wearied intellectuals in Bucharest. In his obituary for Scena magazine, dramatist A. de Herz referred to the deceased as an unpatriotic man of "ferocious egotism", claiming that his leadership of the National Theater had been "dismal". The mood changed soon after the November 1918 Armistice, which sealed the Entente's victory on the Western Front, and returned Romanian Francophiles to high favor. Diamandy's last play, Una dintr-o mie ("One in a Thousand"), was performed by the National Theater in 1919.

Presided upon by Lupu, the Labor Party continued to be active in the opposition, fought against the signing of peace with the Central Powers, and presented its own candidates in the 1918 election. Some of its members were already defecting to the People's League or rejoining the PNL, while the Laborite leadership considered an alliance with the Socialist Party. It eventually merged into Stere's Peasants' Party, which became one of the PNL's leading opponents in the early interwar period. Stere himself rekindled memories of Diamandy by making him a secondary character, "Raul Dionide", in the 1930s novel În preajma revoluției.

The marriage between George and Ștefania Diamandy produced a son, Ion "Iancușor" (1905–1935), and two daughters, Georgeta and Anca. Unusually, they would both be successively married to the same man: aviator Constantin "Bâzu" Cantacuzino, son of the Conservative politico Mihail G. Cantacuzino and of Maruca Rosetti.. Georgeta married first N. A. Stoeanovici, a prominent local politician, landowner and lawyer. The marriage produced two daughters: Sonia married to Niculae Bratianu, and Magda married to Alexandru Mishu. Georgeta's second marriage to Cantacuzino produced one daughter, the writer Oana Orlea (Maria-Ioana Cantacuzino)..

== Plays and prose ==
Diamandy is often regarded as a very minor contributor to Romanian literature. According to Lovinescu, he was as much a "dilettante" here as in archeology and socialism, "cerebral", but lacking "artistic intuition". The same was noted by writer Florin Faifer, who assesses that Diamandy "was not in fact a virtuoso" of drama, losing himself in musings that range "from art to politics and the economy." C. Georgescu Munteanu of Luceafărul condemned Rațiunea de stat as "a pointless work", the dramatization of such "a commonplace fact" that the public could not bring itself to applaud it. Una dintr-o mie also evidenced this problematic style. According to Faifer, its humorous intent was "tortured, burdened by vulgarities." As noted in 2007 by historian Mihai Sorin Rădulescu, Diamandy the dramatist had been "entirely forgotten".

Inspired by the works of Henrik Ibsen, Tot înainte depicts life in the fictional arms industry of Clermont-Ferrand. The young industrialist Jean Héquet intervenes to save the livelihoods of his employees, taking over management from his intransigent father. As a political manifesto, it seemingly favors class collaboration, but, as Călinescu notes, "seems to be rather communistic in spirit." According to Massoff, it was read as "a play with socialist undertones". In Bestia, called by Călinescu "an intellectual play with a confusing exposition", the divorcée Ninetta Coman displays her seemingly visceral misandry. Her viciousness is confronted by an idealistic husband, who (Faifer notes) is an "artificial" character. Towards the end of the play, Ninetta is revealed to have been the long-suffering victim of sexual violence, and to have undergone a voluntary hysterectomy. In Dolorosa, Lovinescu reads echoes from D'Annunzio. It shows the duel of wits between two painters and a woman of their company: she loves the one who does not love her back.

Critics were generally more lenient toward Chemarea codrului. Massoff calls it "one of the good Romanian plays". Lovinescu welcomed its imprecision, which parted with the staples of historical drama while preserving "the national atmosphere"; the result being "a hajduk legend" admitting "poetry and idealism." Călinescu sees Chemarea as Diamandy's "only reasonably valid play", but "false" in content and "embarrassing" with its depiction of sexual controversy. Localized in medieval Rădeana, it alludes to the rape of Anca, a virtuous young woman, by marauding Tatars. Although dishonored under the shame culture of that period, she is defended by the young nobleman, Ioniță, who elopes with her into the surrounding woods.

According to Faifer, Diamandy's other writings display a taste for "the picturesque" and "the unforeseen". These include Ne om, but also his travelogue, his hunting stories, and his novellas. The latter works show bohemian society and the rural elite at their most decadent, subject to illusions and violent passions.
