= Paul Bujor =

Romanian zoologist, physiologist, and politician (1862–1952)

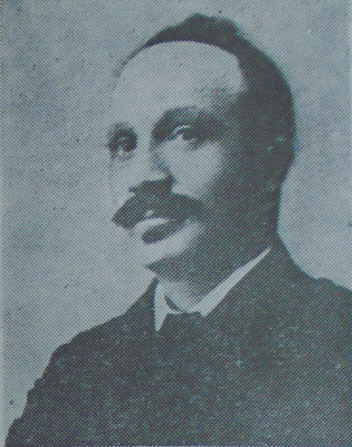
Paul Bujor

Paul Bujor (born Pavel Bujor; August 2, 1862 – May 17, 1952) was a Romanian zoologist, physiologist and marine biologist, also noted as a socialist writer and politician. Hailing from rural Covurlui County, he studied biology in France and Switzerland, where he was attracted by left-wing ideas; his evolutionary biology, informed by the work of Carl Vogt, veered into Marxism and irreligion. Returning to the Kingdom of Romania, he was a junior member of the Romanian Social Democratic Workers' Party, active on its moderate wing. He earned the critics' attention in the 1890s as a short story writer with a socialist and pacifist message, but only returned to fiction writing briefly, in the 1930s. An award-winning ichthyologist, Bujor was hired by the University of Iași, where he taught for 41 years, and throughout the period worked on documenting the Black Sea fauna, and made discoveries concerning the environment of Techirghiol Lake. He inaugurated the Romanian study of animal morphology, while also contributing to histology, embryology, and parasitology, and gave popular lectures on evolution and physical culture.

Bujor rallied with the Poporanist movement, infiltrating the National Liberal Party from the left. He was among the founders of the leading Poporanist review, Viața Românească, but expelled after expressing disagreement with its refusal to criticize the National Liberal mainstream. As an independent left-winger, constantly pushing for land reform and universal suffrage, Bujor had publicized and sometimes violent conflicts with his far-right colleague at university, A. C. Cuza. Elected to Senate as a university representative, and serving throughout the social upheaval of World War I, Bujor clashed with the National Liberal Prime Minister Ion I. C. Brătianu, whom he accused of bringing disaster upon the country. In 1919, he was one of the founders and leaders of Peasants' Party, which became part of a successful electoral coalition, representing groups throughout Greater Romania; Bujor was selected as Greater Romania's first president of the Senate.

The Peasantist attempts at constitutional reform, and Bujor's own signs of approval for far-left concepts, eventually led to a backlash in 1920. Deposed by King Ferdinand I in 1920, Bujor expressed hopes for a revolution against "the oligarchy", but he was gradually marginalized. After 1926, with disciple Ioan Borcea, he represented the dissident left within the consolidated National Peasants' Party, openly criticizing his party's leadership while serving as representative in the Assembly of Deputies. Bujor, still a rival of Cuza, professed anti-fascism throughout the 1930s, but withdrew from the public eye during World War II. He returned to prominence under the communist regime, when, at age 86, he was inducted into the Romanian Academy.

== Biography ==
=== Origins and education ===
Bujor was born in Berești, Covurlui County (now Galați County), on August 2 (Old Style: July 20), 1862. Some sources suggest that his father Gavril was a modest farmer or laborer, but he actually worked as a clerk; his mother, Nastasia, was a housewife. According to philologist Livia Ciupercă, Bujor made efforts to conceal his true origins, and, for this reason, eventually broke all contact with his relatives. Hosted by his grandfather Varlaam, then by an aunt, Pavel attended primary school in Bârlad, followed by the town's Gheorghe Roșca Codreanu National College. As he recalled, during his early years there he received a school inspection from poet Vasile Alecsandri. While living there, he was also roommates with Alexandru Vlahuță, with whom he shared an enthusiasm for Mihai Eminescu's poetry. Vlahuță reportedly wrote his celebrated poem Dormi iubito! ("Sleep, My Love!"), inspired by the sudden death of a Bârlad belle, while recovering in Bujor's room at the boarding school. Bujor remained close friends with the slightly older writer, and stayed over in his house "sometimes for days on end". He later described his meetings, through Vlahuță, with two other major Romanian writers, Bogdan Petriceicu Hasdeu and Barbu Ștefănescu Delavrancea, claiming that he and Vlahuță also helped "recluse" painter Nicolae Grigorescu organize his first-ever retrospective exhibit.

Bujor took his Baccalaureate at Iași (1880), then performed his six-months service in the Romanian Land Forces, at a cavalry regiment, and ultimately enrolled at the Natural Sciences department, University of Bucharest, while working as a copyist in the Ministry of Internal Affairs. At the time, he came to be influenced by Grigore Cobălcescu's materialism, which informed his worldview and attracted him to left-wing ideas. Eventually, sponsored by his brother-in-law, he was able to fulfill his dream of studying biology at the University of Paris, under Henri de Lacaze-Duthiers. According to other reports, he also received a Romanian state scholarship.

In the French capital, he came into contact with international socialism, meeting Jules Guesde and Paul Lafargue. Alongside his biologist colleagues Ioan Cantacuzino, Dimitrie Voinov and Emil Racoviță, he joined the students' socialist circle, presided upon by Ioan Nădejde. He also had friends outside the socialist movement, including Ion I. C. Brătianu—future leader of the National Liberal Party (PNL)—, his brother Dinu, playwright Ion Peretz, and landowner Iuniu Lecca. He also visited Alecsandri and Ion Luca Caragiale, the celebrated playwright and humorist, at his exile homes in Paris and Berlin. He would later recall that Caragiale was impressed by the "socialist education" of German proletarians. However, it is known that Caragiale mocked Bujor in at least one letter he sent to Mihail Dragomirescu.

Having done independent research in marine biology at Villefranche-sur-Mer, Bujor moved to Geneva for specialized courses in animal morphology, under the guidance of Carl Vogt. He had been impressed by Vogt's work and transformist outlook, and was enthusiastic about taking courses under Ernst Haeckel; but he also found life in Paris hardly affordable. Bujor was well-liked by Vogt, who made him part of his research team, and then also worked under Professor Wiederschein at the University of Fribourg; with Grigore Antipa, he began work on a vast project to study the Black Sea fauna, stocking up on specialized instruments. He also continued his engagement with socialism, and attended lectures by Georgi Plekhanov. He received a doctorate in natural sciences from the University of Geneva in 1891; the work described the larval stages of development in the brook lamprey. It was one of the first Romanian contributions to dynamic morphology, and also won Bujor the Rousseau Institute's Davey Prize.

=== PSDMR ===
Upon his return, Bujor had a stint on the University of Bucharest teaching staff, and was an assistant in the physiology laboratory, under Alexandru M. Vitzu. Originally, he had wanted to fulfill his socialist vocation and resign to a schoolteacher's position. He was dissuaded from this by the Marxist philosopher Constantin Dobrogeanu-Gherea, who noted that he could do much more as an academic. This was also the time of Bujor's literary debut, which was also overseen by Dobrogeanu-Gherea—in the 1930s, Bujor described himself as one of the writers "belonging to the generation and literary school shaped by Gherea."

Although sometimes credited as a writer of the Contemporanul circle, Bujor was never actually part of that team, although he may have been in contact with it. Instead, by 1894, he was a noted contributor to Garabet Ibrăileanu's Evenimentul Literar of Iași, and also wrote for Gherea's own review, Literatură și Știință—which hosted various of his "countryside sketches", including the anti-war, didactic Mi-a cântat cucu-n față ("A Cuckoo Sang to My Face"). Written at Médan, it depicted the tragedy of Dinu, a Romanian peasant drafted into the local militia, where he is driven to drink, then to murderous insanity. According to literary historian George Călinescu, "the bourgeois state" is the antagonist. Other critics note that it was the first of several Bujor stories in which urban civilization is a factor for ethical dissolution, a theme "idyllic and ideological", repeated to the point of "obsession".

After Literatură și Știință, Bujor was also a contributor to Lumea Nouă, organ of the Romanian Social Democratic Workers' Party (PSDMR)—although, according to fellow socialist I. C. Atanasiu, he did not involve himself in militant politics, being a regular party member. The same Atanasiu notes that, on Labor Day 1894, Bujor acted as a courier for the PSDMR moderate mainstream, warning the party cell in Galați not to invite in, nor respond to, police violence. In the late 1890s, he and folklorist Gheorghe T. Kirileanu reviewed for print the debut short story of another intellectual from Gherea's circle, namely Paul Zarifopol.

Bujor was eventually hired as a professor in the animal morphology department of the University of Iași in 1895 or 1896 (tenured 1899). In 1898–1899, together with Deodat Țăranu, he was also curator of the Medical and Naturalist Society, criticized by researcher N. A. Bogdan for their inconsistent, "haphazard" work at the numismatics collection. Nevertheless, in 1901 Bujor became the Society's secretary general, serving until 1905 or 1906. His research took him outside the country: with Voinov and Racoviță, he worked as a marine biologist at Banyuls-sur-Mer and at the Stazione Zoologica of Naples, returning with a rich collection of biological samples, which he donated to his faculty. In 1903, with Alexandru Popovici and Leon Cosmovici, he held a pioneering extracurricular course on parasitology. He then followed up with other such courses, in embryology and histology. From 1904, his articles promoting physical culture among the peasantry were hosted by Cultura Română, the popular pedagogy magazine, with Bujor serving as president of the Iași Society for Gymnastics, Sport and Music. His efforts in that field led to the establishment of multi-sport venues in Copou Park, and the first ever chalet on Ceahlău Massif.

A dean in 1906, Bujor published an overview of his faculty's organization and funding. Bujor then laid the foundation for Iași's animal morphology collections; conducted research in descriptive and comparative morphology, as well as in hydrobiology and experimental zoology; and also organized the department's laboratory and museum. He authored scientific articles in Romanian and in French, conducting research into living organisms found in salt lakes. Bujor notably established the biological process whereby black mud is formed in Lake Techirghiol. One of his generation's leading evolutionists, Darwinists, and evolutionary biologists, in January 1907 he gave popular lectures introducing the public to the work of Charles Darwin.

=== Viața Românească and dissidence ===
By 1898, with the PSDMR in the process of disintegration, Bujor had been drawn into the post-socialist agrarian current known as Poporanism, having already been its literary precursor, according to critic Alexandru Hanță. Together with Poporanist leaders Ibrăileanu, Constantin Stere, and Spiridon Popescu, he entered the PNL in 1899, situating himself firmly on the left wing of the organization. In later years, he continued to express his feelings of regret that the PSDMR had fallen apart, and that the movement had blended into a "bourgeois party". As he noted in 1923, his friends' desertion from the PSDMR had made it possible for Brătianu to be elected PNL chairman, meaning that they had been used by him.

This period also brought his sparse literary contributions to Vlahuță and Nicolae Iorga's traditionalist review, Sămănătorul—by 1900, Bujor had met and befriended both Iorga and his associate in Iași, professor A. C. Cuza, who espoused radical Romanian nationalism. Bujor was also one of the few pose writers to contribute in its first edition of 1902. However, by 1905, the split between Poporanism and Sămănătorul was irreconcilable, as Stere, Ibrăileanu and Bujor alike declared that agrarianism could only be progressive, whereas Vlahuță and Iorga defended cultural conservatism. In October 1906, the press reported a "lively conflict" at university, between Cuza and Bujor, "occasioned by the opening ceremony of the academic year."

Together with Stere, Bujor became co-director of the newly launched Poporanist magazine Viața Românească in March 1906, and was also one of the first contributors there. During this period, he published in its pages the sketches Suflete chinuite ("Tormented Souls") and Măcar o lacrimă ("If Only a Tear"), as well as introductions to marine biology. As noted with amusement by Dobrogeanu-Gherea, these were identical to pieces that Bujor had sent to be published in Henric Sanielevici's Curentul Nou. Academic A. D. Xenopol liked the works overall, remarking their "beautiful scientific language". However, he also objected to Bujor's reliance on neologisms.

Bujor remained on the editorial staff until April 1907, when Stere objected to his ideological vacillation—a dispute between them was aired in the daily Opinia, and Ioan Cantacuzino took his place. For his part, Bujor, who now shunned the PNL, depicted Viața Românească as a National Liberal mouthpiece. The peasants' revolt of March 1907 had seen him and his friends Voinov take firm stands against the repressive government of Dimitrie Sturdza.

By then, Bujor also contributed to several other literary magazines, including Arta, Lupta, Noua Revistă Română, and Revista Literară și Științifică (where he was editing secretary), and also to newspapers such as Opinia and Tribuna Conservatoare. His short stories were collected as Mi-a cântat cucu-n față (1910). In 1911, Bujor published the essay Foamea și iubirea în lupta pentru existență ("Hunger and Love in the Fight for Existence"), and, with Cantacuzino, Gheorghe Marinescu, and Francisc Rainer, founded the international journal Annales de Biologie. This activity was followed in 1913 by a piece advocating democratization and land reform (Reforma electorală și agrară). At the time, Bujor warned the establishment that the peasants' revolt would repeat itself unless land would be divided among the landless.

Those years accentuated his conflict with Cuza: in October 1909, when he planned to speak at university about the execution of Francisco Ferrer by the Spanish restoration government, his address was violently interrupted by far-right students. In 1911, he reportedly refused to be granted the Bene-Merenti medal by King Carol I, because Cuza, suspected of plagiarism, was also a recipient; however, he later was created Grand Officer of the Order of the Crown, being received into it at the same time as Cuza, who was appointed Commander.

While marginalized by the Poporanist mainstream, Bujor found a disciple in his junior colleague at university, Ioan Borcea. He also cooperated with biologist Nicolae Leon, sharing his commitment to irreligion, and criticizing the Moldavian Orthodox Bishopric for its consecration ceremonies at university. On his own, Bujor founded a Darwinian Studies Circle, whose students reacted against professors who favored mysticism. His Darwinian studies, carried by Revista Științifică V. Adamachi, discussed issues such as parthenogenesis, and commented on Peter Kropotkin's Mutual Aid: A Factor of Evolution. His other friends in Iași included Octav Băncilă, Eugen Heroveanu and Mihai Pastia, with whom he founded a bakers' cooperative, in early 1912.

=== World War I and Senate eminence ===
Bujor represented his university in the Senate from 1914, the only independent in that chamber. In July 1914, just after the Sarajevo assassination and during the drive to war, he was selected on Toma Stelian's senatorial panel, which proposed reforms to the 1866 constitution. The period coincided with Romania's neutrality in World War I, with Bujor, by then a contributor to Petre P. Carp's Moldova newspaper, involving himself in passionate debates at the university. Alongside his former Poporanist mentor, Stere, he supported Romania's collaboration with the Central Powers, and preferred war against the Russian Empire. While sometimes credited as the author of anti-war Marxist brochures, these were actually written by a namesake, Mihail Gheorghiu Bujor.

At the Senate rostrum, Bujor suggested that no military operation was possible before sorting out "social inequities", as Romania's strength depended on peasant recruits. He debated the issue with the Prime Minister, his old friend Brătianu, who responded that the proposed social reforms were inopportune. In 1916, Romania, under Brătianu's PNL government, entered the war against the Central Powers; by 1917, its territory had been invaded, with only Western Moldavia still under control. The cabinet and both chambers of Parliament relocated to Iași. By April–May 1917, senator Bujor was an ally of the opposition Labor Party and of breakaway Conservative Democrats, calling for more progressive policies than the National Liberals offered. During those months, he joined a parliamentary commission on land reform—although, as PNL man Ion G. Duca notes, these were dominated "by the great landowners, since Brătianu's goal was to get those most affected by the reforms to support them as well." On May 30, he signed up to a list of demands formulated by the Conservative Democrat dissidents Ion C. Grădișteanu and Constantin Argetoianu, which argued that the PNL's plan to enact reforms was "political diversion", one meant to cover Brătianu's contribution to the "national disaster". Duca found this oratory "of no interest at all", simply dismissing Bujor as the "untalented and irrelevant" version of Matei B. Cantacuzino. In the end, Bujor was not among the five senators who voted against reforms as proposed by Brătianu.

The country appeared beaten by early 1918, when she signed an armistice with Germany. Bujor emerged from the Laborer Party (Partidul Muncitor), which he helped establish, from the remnants of Labor Party chapters, in November 1918—just as the world war was ending. The group included other academics (Borcea and Constantin Ion Parhon), and produced collectivist programs, some of which were signed by Bujor himself. In parallel, Bujor and Băncilă adhered to the Brotherhood of Unified Moldavia, a regionalist organization which also regrouped some of his right-wing rivals—including both Cuza and Iorga. In February 1919, the Laborites fused with the Peasants' Party (PȚ), a Poporanist successor and rival of the PNL. Subsequently, Bujor was elected to a seat on the initial central committee of the enlarged organization, which now represented agrarianists throughout Greater Romania. As noted at the time by sociologist Dimitrie Drăghicescu, he was one of many former National Liberals in the PȚ, confirming claims that the Peasantists were only the "impatiently democratic" side of the PNL mainstream. The Bujor faction immediately claimed a degree of autonomy inside the larger movement, forming tactical alliances with parties that the PȚ as a whole disavowed.

In the election of November 1919, which tested universal male suffrage and brought a relative victory for the Romanian National Party (PNR), Bujor returned as senator for his university. He also ran on the PȚ list for the Assembly of Deputies in Iași, and won, but renounced his seat in favor the senatorial mandate; Neculai Costăchescu also renounced, and the seat ultimately went to Gheorghe Ciobanu. Bujor regarded this moment as a great victory for his cause, publishing a thank-you note to his voters, congratulating them for thus "ridding the country of its internal enemy". He accompanied party leader Ion Mihalache during talks with the PNR and other parties, establishing a solidified government coalition. These discussions also involved Iuliu Maniu of the PNR, Ion Inculeț of the Bessarabian Peasants' Party, and both Cuza and Iorga as rival leaders of the Democratic Nationalist Party (PND). As reported by Iorga, Bujor expressed his opposition to the centrist platform adopted by the emerging "Democratic Bloc", declaring himself a man "of the far-left", until Mihalache threatened to expel him from the party.

On November 25, Bujor was officially designated as the coalition candidate for president of the Senate (Greater Romania's first-ever); he was formally elected on November 28. In his speech thanking senators for casting their vote, Bujor again voiced his radicalism, asserting that "dawn shows itself from the East", a discreet allusion to the October Revolution. This generated outrage among opposition members, particularly PNL-ists and Progressive Conservatives who accused him of pro-Bolshevik sympathies. Bujor also had debates with the nationalist senator Ilie Roșoagă, when the latter proposed a vote to recognize Romanian-inhabited portions of the Ukrainian Soviet Socialist Republic as irrendenta. Bujor advocated a détente "between us and our neighbors", and insisted that Romanian Ukrainians would not be forgotten for that. Overall, Bujor endured as a "timidly democratic socialist" (according to Călinescu), a "progressive idealist" (according to the communist Petre Constantinescu-Iași), or, as seen by Drăghicescu, a "likable [and] incorrigible idealist". As argued by historian Radu Filipescu: "Paul Bujor was seen by his contemporaries as a sentimental socialist, a peaceful social dreamer."

By December, Bujor and his colleagues were also trying to obtain support from Alexandru Averescu and his People's Party. Reportedly, they convinced Averescu to accept a reform of the 1866 constitution; in the end, Averescu withdrew from the talks, and embarked on a rapprochement with the PNL. During those weeks, in his many meetings with King Ferdinand, Bujor declared himself a constitutionalist, which the king reportedly found a constructive approach; to Iorga, he stated his intention to work "for democracy". He was despondent when Vaida would not assign prefectures to PȚ men, declaring that the opportunity for a regime change had been lost. Renewing his support for land reform, Bujor was again a noted critic of the antisemitic Cuza, whom he accused of wanting to destroy the university with his mystical rhetoric and his violent actions. He was also reportedly upset that Cuza was the government's key man in Iași.

=== 1920 marginalization ===
During the early months of 1920, Bujor reverted to a more uncompromising stance, voting to put pressure on the king and thus force into law Mihalache's land reform proposal. On March 12–13, the king informed him and Iorga that he expected Democratic Bloc ministers to resign, with Bujor protesting, in vain, that the regime being revoked was "good for the country". When Averescu took over as prime minister, Bujor, waiting to be deposed from his Senate chairmanship, was one of several calling Bloc leaders still calling for resistance. The Democratic Bloc fell apart on March 18, and Bujor was one of those supporting the divorce, with hopes of renegotiating alliances; two days later, he also streamlined an alliance with Iorga's half of the PND. Bujor was one of the PȚ delegates on the bureau of the resulting Federation of National Social Democracy (FDNS). Other leading members were Vaida, Maniu, Mihalache, Nicolae L. Lupu, Ion Nistor, Virgil Madgearu, and Ion Inculeț. As Iorga notes, during the banquet marking this alliance, Bujor perplexed those in the audience by again mentioning his revolutionary credentials and, obliquely, his proletarian internationalism.

During July, Bujor in the Senate and Mihalache in the Assembly reintroduced for debate their radical version of land reform. Both proposals were ignored, and parliament only debated a more conservative project, advanced by Averescu's Agriculture Minister, Constantin Garoflid; this incensed the FDNS to address the peasants directly, with leaflets condemning the lawmaking-landowners. Alongside Iorga, Bujor also proposed the nationalization of underground resources, against Garoflid, who wanted the subsoil placed under a mixed property regime. As the Democratic Nationalists split, with Cuza backing Averescu, Bujor openly celebrated Iorga as the more progressive nationalist, one "in the spirit of the times".

During 1921, Bujor joined a parliamentary board of inquiry into the Romanian administration of Bessarabia, presided upon by Nicolae Constantin Batzaria. Alongside Vasile Săcară and others, he inspected Cahul County, where he recorded various cases of official misconduct, including theft of property and beatings. During the constitutional debates, he supported the (ultimately defeated) women's suffrage motion presented by George Meitani, arguing that the graduation of women into politics was "a necessity imposed on us by the social conditions". Women, he noted, had proven themselves competent workers and managers during the war years.

Ahead of the 1922 elections, with Brătianu again returning in power, Bujor declared an all-out fight with the "oligarchy" for the "holy rights of liberty and justice." He optimistically argued that the "three-headed dragon" would be defeated by the "fire-sword archangel" of democracy, claiming that the fall of the Vaida cabinet was just a symptom of the PNL's losing struggle. During those weeks, he and Ion Răducanu were the two PȚ envoys negotiating an alliance with the PNR, the Conservative Democrats, and the Progressive Conservatives. He himself was returned to the Senate, when he defended himself against renewed accusations, voiced by the PNL's Victor Iamandi, that he had "really done it" with his "dawn in the East" statement. Bujor dismissed this, arguing that Iamandi and his National Liberals were picking up on any detail that might help them silence the opposition. However, following the establishment and immediate repression of the Romanian Communist Party, Bujor appeared as a defense witness in the Dealul Spirii Trial, where he spoke favorably of communists such as Timotei Marin.

Bujor unsuccessfully fought against the 1923 constitution, proposed by a PNL-dominated Assembly. In his editorial for Adevărul in March 1923, he declared the PNL to be a party of the far-right, penetrated not just by oligarchy, but also by the "obscurantism" of extremist movements. He also accused the formerly progressive Brătianu of "cowardice" for having gone back on promises for proportional representation. With the Bessarabian Vasile Stroescu, and with many other activists and socialists, he founded in August the League for Human Rights. In October 1924, speaking both in parliament and at university, Bujor condemned Cuza's disciple, Corneliu Zelea Codreanu, for the assassination of Constantin Manciu—described by him as an "odious" deed, one ultimately inspired by Cuza and the National-Christian Defense League.

=== Later years ===
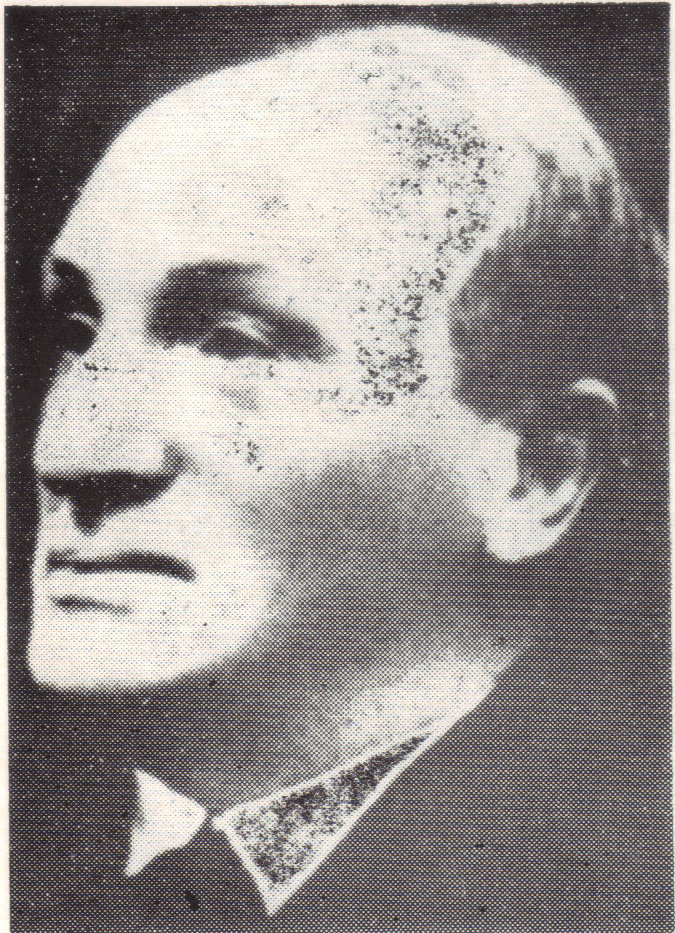
Bujor in old age

In the June 1926 election, Bujor won an Assembly seat for Iași County, as one of two deputies not affiliated with the People's Party; the other was Cuza for the Defense League. Eventually, Bujor followed the Peasantists into merger with the PNR, thus joining the consolidated National Peasants' Party (PNȚ). He was head of its Iași chapter until June 1928, when he resigned without renouncing his membership. Responding to rumors that he was going to rejoin the PNL, Bujor announced that the only two parties he supported were the PNȚ and the Social Democrats.

Although the PNȚ carried the elections of December 1928, both Bujor and Borcea remained on the group's far-left, criticizing perceived fascist tendencies on the right, and were, overall, largely inactive members. Such internal opposition was expressed in October 1930, when Bujor wrote another Adevărul editorial asking for the inclusion of Social Democratic ministers. He also denounced the PNȚ "oligarchy", portraying Iuliu Maniu as a dictator and exposing Vaida as a "reactionary antisemite", guilty of having "massacred innocent workers at Lupeni". In parallel interviews for Adevărul, he and the former socialist Atanasiu were debating whether the PSDMR had any chance of surviving the 1898 split: while Bujor suggested that it did, Atanasiu insisted that Romania was not ripe for socialism. Bujor's other political involvement was with the Action Committee of the League Against War, where he was colleagues with another Iași academic, Iorgu Iordan.

Among his last academic assignments was touring Greater Romania on an examination commission, testing the Romanian-language aptitudes of the teaching staff inherited from Austria-Hungary. His irreligion interfered with this project: he decided to examine Jewish professors from Oradea on August 11, 1934, which was a Shabbat. After 40 years of teaching, Bujor retired from his university chair in 1936. By then, his pupil Borcea had died, leaving him to deplore the loss of a "dutiful professor and citizen", "my kind and beloved colleague". His death, Bujor claimed, was attributable to "great sorrow" over the rise of Romanian fascism. In January 1937, a speaker at a PNȚ youth rally which doubled as an anti-fascist demonstration, Bujor honored the "precursor and martyr of peasantism", Constantin Dobrescu-Argeș. By April, again formally affiliated with the Viața Românească writers and their anti-fascist platform, Bujor expressed publicly his support for the novelist Mihail Sadoveanu, who was being targeted by the far-right press.

Bujor lived all his remaining years in Bucharest, occupying a home at the Natural History Museum, an institution which he expanded and modernized. His final works in literature where the 1938 short story collection Îndurare! ("Forgiveness!"), titled after a piece in which the protagonist, a peasant, exacts cruel revenge on his oppressor; and a 1939 memoir, Amintiri de A. Vlahuță și I. L. Caragiale ("Recollections about A. Vlahuță and I. L. Caragiale"). The latter work, scholar Dan Jumară, remains "convincing" as a literary contribution, although it is "written in the sociological manner."

Following World War II, Bujor returned to public life as an associate of the new communist regime—Livia Ciupercă describes him as a "firebrand propagandist of the socialist-communist doctrine." In 1948, when government revamped the Romanian Academy, he was elected an honorary member, his candidature personally endorsed by Traian Săvulescu. Decorated with Ordinul Muncii, 1st Class, he also received a seat on the Grivița people's council in the 1950 local elections. His selected prose appeared in 1951 as Scrieri alese. As Bujor himself explained in articles for the official newspaper Scînteia, he was also co-opted by the World Peace Council, holding political meetings with Grivița workers to condemn the "imperialist governments of the West." He also noted: "I deeply regret that my advanced age will not permit me to be as active in this as I would like."

Nevertheless, in his last years, Bujor was plagued by financial uncertainty, and resorted to petitioning the state for an increase of his income. He died at his museum home in Bucharest on May 17, 1952, and was incinerated at Cenușa crematorium that same day. The ceremony was attended by a delegation from Iași university, headed by Teofil Vescan, and by academicians Ștefan Vencov and Nicolae Sălăgeanu. His ashes were then deposited near the mausoleum in Carol Park. Among his papers was a short story, preserved by the Museum of Romanian Literature and only published in 2014 by Dacia Literară. Titled Bărbuță Lăutarul, it has for an eponymous protagonist a Romany violinist, or lăutar, marginalized and left to starve by the phonograph.
