= Labor Party (Romania) =

Labor Party Partidul Muncei
- Electoral symbol of the Labor Party (1919)
- Leader: George Diamandy; Nicolae L. Lupu
- Founded: April 27/May 1, 1917
- Dissolved: 1921
- Split from: National Liberal Party
- Merged into: People's League; Peasants' Party
- Headquarters: 40 de Sfinți Alley, Iași, Kingdom of Romania (1917)
- Newspaper: Tribuna
- Ideology: Reformism; Agrarian socialism Poporanism; Republicanism (minority)
- Political position: Left-wing
- National affiliation: Independent-Popular List (1919); Parliamentary Bloc (1920)
- Colours: Red

The Labor Party (Romanian: Partidul Muncei, modernized Partidul Muncii, PM) was a minor left-wing political group in Romania. Based in the city of Iași, and founded by George Diamandy, in its inception it was a split from the National Liberal Party (PNL). The PM responded to the major social and political crisis sparked by World War I, with the southern regions of Romania having been invaded and occupied by Germany. It notably pushed for urgent land reform, universal suffrage, and labor rights, also wishing to replace the 1866 Constitution with a more democratic one, and advocating class collaboration. Through Diamandy, its roots were planted in the "generous youth" current of 19th-century reformism.

Co-chaired by Nicolae L. Lupu, the PM grouped disgruntled members of the PNL, old affiliates of homegrown Poporanism, and left-agarianists with republican leanings, inspired by the success of Russian Revolutionary Socialists (or "Esers"). It was perceived as a nuisance by the institutions of the Romanian Kingdom, but largely dismissed as shambolic, and reportedly criticized as "bourgeois" by Russian radicals. It campaigned independently during the June 1918 elections, but these registered a sweep for the Conservative Party; the PM only held one seat in Chamber, taken by Grigore Trancu-Iași.

Pushed into obscurity by the events of the war, which drove its other leaders into exile, the PM, relaunched under the leadership of landowner Numa Protopopescu, divided itself into factions. One of these continued to survive as a separate wing of the anti-PNL People's League. Lupu later reorganized the group as a component of the "Parliamentary Bloc", backing a government formed around the Romanian National Party in 1920. He and his supporters were also among those who established the Peasants' Party in 1921.

== History ==
=== Origins ===
A rebellious aristocrat and landowner, Diamandy was introduced to socialism ca. 1887, when he wrote his first articles in the Marxist review Contemporanul. In the 1890s, he had set up in Paris his own L'Ère Nouvelle, which represented a heterodox form of Marxism, and helped launch the writing career of Georges Sorel. As the latter noted, Diamandy was an "unreliable" character, who "simply disappeared" from his life at some point. Diamandy's pragmatic Marxism was developed during his years in the Romanian Social Democratic Workers' Party (PSDMR), where he sought to introduce a policy of alliances with the establishment parties: first a cartel with the Conservative Party, and later a form of close cooperation with the PNL, to the point of merger.

By 1899, Diamandy supported making the PSDMR into a reformist "National Democratic" or "Progressive Democratic" party, and sealed deals with the PNL's own "Poporanist" (agrarian) wing. This effectively split the PSDMR into two or more factions: the "generous youth" faction, led by Diamandy and Vasile Morțun, registered with the PNL. During the following 10 years, Diamandy, still calling himself a dialectical materialist, became an internal critic of National Liberalism. His Revista Democrației Române accused the PNL establishment of having turned reactionary and sketched out a plan for the introduction of universal male suffrage. Pushed out of political affairs by the PNL's leadership before the March 1911 elections, Diamandy focused on his activity as a comedic writer. He returned to the mainstream during the early stages of World War I, when Romania preserved a policy of neutrality under PNL Prime Minister Ion I. C. Brătianu. The latter selected Diamandy as his semi-official envoy to Entente countries, where he negotiated deals and treaties of mutual assistance.

Diamandy was again elected to Chamber in 1914, where he showed himself to be a cautious supporter of an alliance between Romania and the Entente. In summer 1916, Brătianu agreed to a political and territorial deal, and Romania entered the war as an Entente country. Diamandy fought in the subsequent campaign, but was soon hospitalized for a heart condition. In short while, Romania was overwhelmed by the Central Powers, losing the Battle of Bucharest; the government and the Chamber were moved to Iași, the provisional capital, and Romania continued to fight alongside the Russian Empire. Retaking his seat, Diamandy reemerged as one of Brătianu's extreme critics, accusing him of having mismanaged the whole campaign. The February Revolution of 1917 installed a left-leaning and republican Government of Russia, which rekindled Diamandy's radicalism. Reportedly, he argued that the new Russian democracy was incompatible with Brătianu's "tyrannical" government.

=== Activities ===
On April 27 or May 1, 1917, Diamandy formed the PM as a parliamentary party, centered on the issue of land reform. Described in literature as a "broad bourgeois democratic" tendency, a "left-bourgeois party", or the parliament's "socialist faction", it supposedly comprised "mainly [politicians] formed at the school of socialism." Diamandy openly criticized the PNL for wanting to enact a redistribution of land, since, he claimed, Brătianu no longer had a "moral right" to do so. According to the PNL's Ion G. Duca, Diamandy was bluffing, as he himself did not support a complete land reform. The Minister of Agriculture, Gheorghe Gh. Mârzescu, was also a critic of Diamandy's politics, describing them as an elaborate "operetta" production "for the benefit of the peasants". According to writer and civil servant Arthur Gorovei, his friend Diamandy was known locally for persecuting the peasants living on his own estate.

Diamandy soon became noted for his displays of Russian socialist symbolism, in particular calico redshirts, "Russian worker's blouse[s]", or tolstovka garments. He was the PM theoretician, authoring its program and publishing it as a brochure. Calling for the union of "clean souls" and "healthy energies", it proposed a universal land reform giving each peasant 5 hectares of land, and a vote for all citizens over the age of 20, women included. Also included as demands were the right to strike, child labor laws, a nationalization of the National Bank, and a new constitution enshrining class collaboration. The party also drew up plans for decentralization with economic interventionism, cooperative farming, progressive taxation, and the expropriation of the subsoil. The brochure was immediately confiscated by military censorship, acting on Duca's orders; the latter explained that he did object to its demands, but disliked its combative nature in a time of crisis. According to Duca's hostile account, the PM was largely shaped by Diamandy's "pathological state", his heart disease having led him to lose his sense of control and moderation. Gorovei also dismissed the PM as a "prank".

The party manifesto was signed at the Diamandy home on 40 de Sfinți Alley, with the socialist-and-Poporanist physician Ioan Cantacuzino as its first signatory; their document was read out in parliament by Diamandy, and therefore had to be published in the government gazette, Monitorul Oficial, which rendered censorship futile. The radical agrarianist Nicolae L. Lupu, whose signature was also present on that document, was selected as the PM co-chairman. A physician and civil servant, he had published in the Poporanist press indictments of the social misery and political repression prevalent in the countryside. Lupu's advocacy of land reform took the form of a personal conflict with Mârzescu, carried out in Chamber.

Outside parliament, several figures from civil society also signed their names to the party manifesto: journalist Eugen Goga (brother of the more famous poet), lawyer Deodat Țăranu, teachers Mihai Pastia and Spiridon Popescu, and chemist Petre Bogdan. The party was also joined by Grigore Iunian, Grigore Trancu-Iași, Mihail Macavei, and four other PNL with various grievances against their former party: Mihai Carp, Tilică Ioanid, Ioan P. Rădulescu-Putna, and Numa "Nunucă" Protopopescu. Reportedly, the PM also claimed to have registered a verbal pledge of support from the "peasant deputy" Andrei Marinescu, who died in the typhus epidemic. Marinescu's funeral, Duca reports, was a "macabre scene", in which the PNL and PM speakers "fought over the corpse". Other affiliates included doctors Constantin Ion Parhon and Alexandru Slătineanu.

The PM coexisted with an Orthodox Marxist group, set up in Iași by Leon Ghelerter and Max Wexler (the latter of whom was assassinated in May "for his attempts to carry out a revolution in Romania"). Ghelerter and his colleagues viewed the Laborites as impostors, "a diversion by the authorities to control the workers". This suspicion was at least in part validated by Trancu-Iași, who boasted to King Ferdinand I: "our party's role is to lure the working strata into a healthy direction". In specifying what was "unhealthy", Trancu-Iași nominated three leading socialists on the far-left: Christian Rakovski, I. C. Frimu, and Alecu Constantinescu. In addition to promoting land and electoral reforms, the PM was still widely suspected of being republican and conspiratorial. Ferdinand feared "the growth of a socialist movement in our country", and more particularly Diamandy's contacts with the Esers. On its left, the PM included republicans such as Lupu, who allegedly carried out secret negotiations with other politicians, and with the Russians, in order to bring down both the king and Brătianu through a putsch. According to Duca, these negotiations stalled when the envoy of the Iași military soviet discovered that the "oligarchic" and "bourgeois" PM had no backing in the countryside.

The PM was founded just days after a street demonstration organized by the Russian soviet, described by Duca as an attempted coup spurred on by the socialist Rakovski, supposedly thwarted by a Romanian demonstration of strength. According to Duca, the PM intended to partake in the putsch, but "in the end got scared [...] because they sensed that if the Russian revolutionaries are to stage a coup, it would not go in their favor". Diamandy, who was structurally a monarchist, printed a call to order, addressing it to the Romanian proletariat. Afterward, the Laborites portrayed themselves as patriotic resisters, and Lupu even threatened to duel those who questioned his loyalty. The PM continued to have links with the revolutionary activist Ilie Cătărău, who was Lupu's emissary among the Romanian-speakers of the Russian Bessarabia Governorate. He contacted the National Moldavian Party, whose leader Pan Halippa dismissed the PM as irrelevant.

=== Dissolution ===
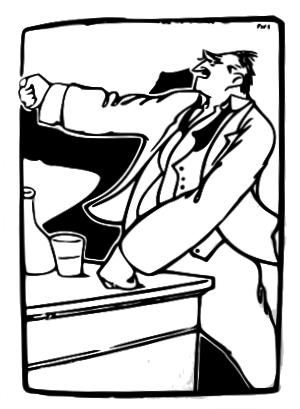
March 1922 caricature of Nicolae L. Lupu, by Victor Ion Popa

Trancu-Iași reports that, in May–June 1917, renewed offensive of the Central Powers and a serious government crisis, decision-makers to "implore" that Diamandy and Cantacuzino join the cabinet team as PM representatives—Cantacuzino refused the offer. The ailing Diamandy, meanwhile, became one of the various Romanian public figures taking refuge in Russia. He was caught there by the October Revolution, and again took flight, died on board a refugee ship sailing the North Sea. The same month, Lupu also left Romania as a delegate of the University Professors' Association, campaigning for the Romanian cause in the United States. According to Duca, his escaping was the equivalent of a desertion, leaving typhus-stricken Romania without a highly trained physician. Lupu defended himself against such accusations by citing his role as a founder of the Labor Party: "in this capacity, I could form direct links with the Western democracies"; his contacts included Marcel Cachin and Ramsay MacDonald.

Lupu was still PM president in early 1918, when a Conservative cabinet, presided upon by Alexandru Marghiloman, was called in to sign peace with the Central Powers. The PM, which coalesced around a Iași newspaper called Tribuna, fought against that measure, and against Marghiloman's other policies, presenting its own candidates for the 1918 election. These were held with universal male suffrage, the Laborites having been instrumental in blocking legislation for Demeny voting and other such forms of disenfranchisement. Marghiloman's candidates emerged as winners with a crushing majority, with the PM taking no seats in Senate and only one in Chamber—with Trancu-Iași. With Simeon G. Murafa, Cătărău founded his own "Romanian Revolutionary Party", a blend of anarchism and Romanian nationalism, before the Russian government arrested him for his propaganda in Bessarabia.

Although the PM's Carp announced a worldwide "rapid evolution to the left" and the transfer of social control toward "the grand army of labor", the group as a whole was viewed as moderate, or even reactionary. An editorial note by the satirist George Ranetti suggests that, in December 1918, the PM was presided upon by Protopopescu, who, as a millionaire landowner, did not have to work for a living. Also according to Ranetti, Protopopescu's promises of sweeping reforms, including Jewish emancipation and women's suffrage, could only be read as a "seductive yarn", as long as the leadership was fundamentally cut off from the lower strata of society. The party was also joined by civil servant Grigore Filipescu, formerly a dissident Conservative. He was close to the politically ambitious General Alexandru Averescu, supporting a broad front against the PNL, to be established under Averescu's presidency.

In April 1919, represented by Trancu-Iași, the PM signed up to the People's League (PL), created in Iași by Averescu. Various other former PM members opted to return into the PNL. The PM was generally considered defunct by late 1918 or early 1919. However, the LP was purposefully created as a federation, allowing for the existence of individual parties–Filipescu personally moderated between the LP's far-right, represented by A. C. Cuza, and his PM colleagues. Weeks before the November 1919 elections, Trancu-Iași announced that he was chairman of the Labor Party and that he would submit a Laborite list, separate from, and in competition to, the LP. A note in the PNL organ Mișcarea reported that the PM in Iași County had become a "Peasants' Party" and was "made up of only 8-to-10 people", "unsure about whether to field candidates or to form a cartel with any other group". Throughout the interval, the Laborites had talks with the consolidated Socialist Party (PS), a nominal successor of the PSDR. Lupu and his followers negotiated directly with the PS, but found it impossible to agree on a common platform.

During the elections, Lupu signed up with the Independent-Popular List, getting himself reelected. This group, which won support from Adevărul newspaper and used a bell for its electoral symbol, also included dissidents from other parties, among them Constantin Costa-Foru and N. D. Cocea. Trancu-Iași and his followers endorsed Averescu, who became Prime Minister in March 1920. Trancu-Iași's own contribution as Romania's inaugural Minister of Labor was controversial, with writer Vasile Savel assessing that he was a hypocrite, who clamped down on striking clerks while still passing for a "far-leftist element, as one who had been in Mr Lupu's labor party". He was also hotly contested by the mainline PS, resulting in the workers' unrest of October 1920. Trancu-Iași himself was satisfied with his tenure, noting in 1934 that all demands stated in the PM's original manifesto had by then been fulfilled.

Defining himself as a "socialist in my own way", a "national socialist" and a monarchist, Lupu was also an ally of Ion Mihalache's Peasants' Party (PȚ), and strongly opposed to Averescu's policies. To his old proposals for reform, he added mandatory leasing and rent regulation, in an effort to ensure affordable housing. In 1920, he registered the PM as a component of the "Parliamentary Bloc" governing alliance, which comprised the PȚ, the Romanian National Party, the Democratic Nationalist Party, the Bessarabian Peasants' Party, and the Democratic Union Party. Lupu continued to claim leadership of the PM, when, in 1921, it formalized its fusion with the PȚ; Parhon, affiliated with the short-lived Laborer Party (Partidul Muncitor), had rallied with the PȚ in 1919. Macavei remains the only documented case of a PM member joining the PS; affiliating with the socialists' far-left, he later became a member of the outlawed Communist Party.

== Electoral history ==
=== Legislative elections ===
Election	Votes	%	Assembly	Senate	Position
1918			1 / 174	0 / 121	5th
