= Alexandru Slătineanu =

Romanian scientist (1873–1939)

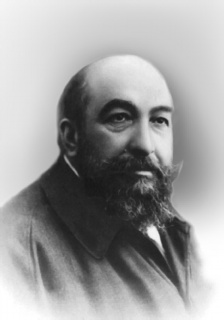
Alexandru Slătineanu

Alexandru Slătineanu (January 5, 1873 – November 27, 1939) was a Romanian bacteriologist, civil servant, and art collector. From an aristocratic and intellectual background, he embraced socialism while studying in Paris in the 1890s, becoming a lifelong associate of the socialist physician Ioan Cantacuzino. Slătineanu served his country in the Second Balkan War and World War I, creating a medical infrastructure designed to combat cholera and typhus, and improving immunology research. His laboratory continued to set the national standard in the field of bacteriology during the interwar years.

From 1923 to 1926, Slătineanu was rector of the University of Iași, where he fought against antisemitism and curbed attempts at imposing racial segregation. He managed a private clinic and a rural sanitarium, seconded Cantacuzino at the Health Ministry, and set up a model village in Tomești. His large collection of decorative art and manuscripts was opened as a private museum after his death. Managed and enriched by his son, Barbu Slătineanu, it passed into state property during the communist period, when the surviving Slătineanus were exposed to political persecution.

== Biography ==
=== Origins and education ===
Slătineanu family coat of arms

Born in Bucharest, he came from a prominent Oltenian boyar family. His grandfather Iordache, husband of Princess Safta Brâncoveanu, had translated the works of Metastasio into Romanian, illustrating and printing them at Sibiu in 1797. The doctor's father, also called Alexandru, had helped to set up agricultural education in Wallachia. He himself attended primary school in his native city, followed by Saint Sava National College.

In 1892, he left for the University of Paris, and would remain in the French capital for a decade. At the medical faculty there, his professors included Louis Hubert Farabeuf (anatomy), Mathias-Marie Duval (histology), Paul Georges Dieulafoy, Pierre Potain and Sigismond Jaccoud (internal pathology), Paul Jules Tillaux and Paul Reclus (surgery) and Jean-Martin Charcot (neurology). He also attended Édouard Brissaud's optional course on the history of medicine. In 1894, he began working as an extern in the Paris hospitals. He married Irina Metaxa, who came from a prominent Greek family. Their son Barbu, a future expert in Romanian folk ceramics and military inspector, was born in Paris in 1895.

Wishing to deepen his knowledge of chemistry and biology in order to better understand pathology, Slătineanu took a degree in natural sciences at the Sorbonne, where he was particularly engaged by the chemistry courses. At the Collège de France, he audited courses with Théodule-Armand Ribot, who showed the links between psychopathology and pathological states; and at the law faculty, he studied contemporary social and socialist doctrines. Attracted by the Pasteur Institute's prestige and encouraged by his friend Ioan Cantacuzino, he worked in Élie Metchnikoff's laboratory and audited courses taught by Louis Pasteur's students, in particular the chemistry class taught by Émile Duclaux. He defended his doctoral thesis in 1901; the subject was experimental sepsis caused by Haemophilus influenzae and attempts at immunization.

In his spare time, he visited museums, rare bookshops, and walked along the banks of the Seine, with frequent stops at the book stands. He would purchase rare books, engravings, lithographs and drawings. As he himself later noted, his taste for art was shaped by Cantacuzino, "one of the greatest experts in painting and printing that I have ever met." Together with other young Romanians, he was a regular customer at several cafés, including Procop, Soleil d'Or, and Café Voltaire. It was in this context that both Cantacuzino and Slătineanu became followers of socialism. They drew sympathy from Jean Jaurès, Georges Clemenceau and René Viviani, and were allowed to write in local newspapers about the ongoing controversy regarding the Transylvanian Memorandum signatories. Upon his return home in 1902, he became chief of operations at the experimental medicine department, newly established by Cantacuzino within the University of Bucharest's medical faculty.

In 1905, Slătineanu was one of the founders of Revista Științelor Medicale, of which he became the chief contributor. His articles mainly dealt with widespread diseases and their effect on the population's biological health: pellagra, tuberculosis, malaria, typhoid fever, scarlet fever, typhus and cholera. On Saturdays, he and Cantacuzino lectured at the Hotel de Franța to an audience of proletarians and socialist cadres. From 1907, Slătineanu also wrote in Cantacuzino's left-wing generalist publication Viața Românească; his contributions included stories from the medical, university and social fields.

In addition to his laboratory work, Slătineanu was active as a hospital physician, and, between 1907 and 1912, as health inspector for epidemics, worked with Cantacuzino to reorganize the health service. During the cholera epidemic of September 1911, Slătineanu identified the main channel of disease propagation: from the port city of Brăila to the upriver Piatra Neamț, with the returning timber rafters. He responded by ordering the disease carriers back to Brăila.

=== Early academic career and World War I service ===
In February 1912, he was hired as a professor at the bacteriology department of the University of Iași medical faculty. The department lacked a physical space and a laboratory, and for nearly thirteen years had been staffed by substitute professors. Working in a room in Corneliu Șumuleanu's chemistry department, he offered a popular course attended by doctors as well as students. In 1913, during the Second Balkan War, he was sent to the front in Bulgaria in order to deal with a cholera epidemic among Romanian Army soldiers. Decorated with the Military Virtue Medal in gold, he returned in 1914 and began to set up a bacteriology laboratory. He trained the first assistants and rented and furnished a house. Although the initial 10,000 lei and the additional 3000 lei per year received from the Education Ministry were woefully inadequate, he supplemented these with personal funds, private donations and substantial grants from the health department of the Interior Ministry, managing to set up a suitable laboratory for a country that had entered World War I by 1916. His textbook of epidemiology and vaccination, coauthored with Constantin Ionescu-Mihăești and Mihai Ciucă, had come out in 1915.

Slătineanu headed the 2nd Army's health service, fighting against cholera on the Dobrudja front (where his son also served with distinction) and among prisoners of war at Galați. The following year, under Cantacuzino's leadership, he battled epidemic typhus. Politically, he supported the Labor Party, a radical socialist group formed by George Diamandy in an attempt to speed up electoral democracy and land reform. Writing at the time, Gheorghe Gh. Mârzescu, of the governing National Liberals, dismissed the enterprise as an "operetta", noting that it had no rooting in "the country's social underclass". Slătineanu, he claims, acted "the Turk" in this production.

From August to November 1917, amidst a deteriorating war situation, Slătineanu took refuge in Kharkov, Russia. There, the director of the local bacteriological institute adopted his method for preparing an anti-cholera vaccine in large quantities and administering it in a single dose. From his return until the following year, he headed Cantacuzino's experimental medicine laboratory, which had been evacuated to Iași from German-occupied Bucharest. The laboratory prepared serums and vaccines for the Romanian, Russian and French armies operating in the area, as well as for the local civilian population and for refugees who had fled from the German-occupied part of the country. Thus, with the need to import the preparations eliminated, the treasury was saved over 3 million lei in gold. For his war efforts, he was granted the Order of Queen Marie, first class (1917); the commander of the Order of the Crown with swords; and the knighthood of the Legion of Honour (1918).

=== Postwar course ===
Slătineanu was head of the public health directorate from 1918 to 1920. He continued developing the laboratory, which eventually had three sections: bacteriology, physical chemistry and biochemistry, and hematology and histopathology. Its professionalism brought success: work contracts brought significant sums; medical, veterinary, military and civilian authorities sought its services; and it certified the quality of laboratory glass manufactured domestically. In 1919, while Cantacuzino was attending the Paris Peace Conference as a delegate, Slătineanu taught at the experimental medicine department in Bucharest. In 1920, he initiated a course on infectious diseases and set up an isolation unit for contagious diseases at Sfântul Spiridon Hospital in Iași.

Slătineanu served as rector of Iași University from 1923 to 1926, intervening with the central government to prevent the marginalization of the Iași academic milieu. In 1925, he published the brochure Situațiunea Universității din Iași ("The State of Affairs at Iași University"). It detailed its chronic underfunding by government, deterioration of its learning facilities, and its past appeals to private sponsors such as the Rockefeller Foundation.

This was also a time of significant student disturbances, fomented by the law on Jewish emancipation. In December 1923, Slătineanu stood up to antisemitism and calls for racial segregation, demanding Gendarmerie cordons between Jewish students their Christian attackers, as well as punitive measures against professors who would not teach desegregated classes. A year later, following renewed pressures from his Romanian students, Slătineanu authorized a nationalist demonstration to take place on university grounds, but demanded guarantees that it would not lead to violence, and alerted the Gendarmes to stand by. The meeting degenerated into a riot, and this paralyzed academic life. Slătineanu's subsequent decision to resign was vetoed by other members of the university staff. On the occasion the nationalist philosopher Ion Petrovici alleged that Slătineanu was in part guilty for the riots, having "isolated himself" and "paying no attention to the students' soul." In March 1926, Slătineanu, faced with an antisemitic students' strike and cases of criminal assault on Jewish students, pleaded for the expulsion of confirmed instigators.

Slătineanu was still part of the university senate in 1928-1929 and in 1933. He also became head of the Iași hygiene institute in 1930, and set up a tuberculosis sanatorium in nearby Erbiceni. He served as general secretary under Health Minister Cantacuzino, between 1931 and 1933. He wrote articles arguing that the high mortality rate in Romania's rural areas was not simply a matter of health, but had to do with lack of education, poverty, malnutrition, with political and administrative causes. Still a socialist, Slătineanu believed the 1923 land reform entrenched a form of neo-serfdom that did not address other issues plaguing the peasantry. He organized a model health system in Tomești plasă where he introduced various methods of health education. One of these consisted of a garden where the local peasants would learn how to cultivate vegetables with a rational system of nutrition in mind.

=== Final years, death, and legacy ===
For several months in 1930, Slătineanu taught a course on general pathology at Iași, and, from 1930 to 1931, headed a medical clinic. For his peacetime activities, he was made a grand officer of the Order of the Star of Romania and the Order of the Crown. He continued writing for Viața Românească down to 1937, when he also contributed, in Revista Fundațiilor Regale, a piece that sought to revive interest in Arthur de Gobineau and the Aryan race theory. His other articles saw print in Grigore T. Popa's Însemnări Ieșene review.

Having reached the retirement age, he was obliged to leave his position in September 1938, after which he donated instruments, furniture and a valuable library to the Iași bacteriology department. He died fourteen months later. His collection of art, comprising decorative objects from France and the Levant, as well as numerous bibliophile items, and enriched with folk art brought in by his son, was opened for the public as the Slătineanu Comparative Art Museum later that year, at the family home in Cotroceni. His hundreds of Honoré Daumier prints were later donated to the Romanian Academy Library.

With the end of World War II and the imposition of a communist regime, the Slătineanus became victims of political persecution: Alexandru's grandson, Stroe-Constantin Slătineanu, spent some three years in communist prisons; the estate was nationalized in 1949, and the Cotroceni museum was confiscated a year later. The authorities eventually allowed the ailing Barbu Slătineanu to live on the premises, as curator of his and his father's collection. A devout Orthodox, he affiliated with the clandestine literary and religious circle presided upon by Vasile Voiculescu, and helped circulate Voiculescu's samizdats. Eventually arrested in 1958, he died a year later, during interrogation in Jilava Prison. His widow, Alexandra, daughter of politician Alexandru Lahovary, donated the remainder of his papers to the state; she died in 1979.
