= Spiridon Popescu =

Romanian prose writer

Spiridon Popescu (August 13, 1864 – May 8, 1933) was a Romanian prose writer.

Born in Rogojeni, Galați County, his parents were the peasant Constantin Dumitrașcu al Popei and his wife Safta (née Tofan). He attended seminary in Galați and at Socola Monastery in Iași, earning his high school degree at age 26. He studied physics and mathematics at the University of Iași and took courses at the higher normal school, earning a mathematics degree at age 31. He taught mathematics in Bârlad, Vaslui, Tulcea, Galați and, from 1904, in the national capital, Bucharest. Within the Education Ministry, Popescu was responsible for normal primary education nationwide. He was elected both to the Assembly of Deputies and to the Senate.

Popescu made his literary debut in the Iași-based Arhiva in 1890. Encouraged by his brother-in-law Constantin Stere, he wrote for Evenimentul literar, and for Albina. As an active participant in the policy of village education promoted by Spiru Haret, he also contributed to Viața Românească, where he published the Poporanist novellas Moș Gheorghe la expoziție (1907) and Rătăcirea din Stoborăni (1909). His first book was Considerațiuni psihologice din viața poporului român (1893), followed by Din povestirile unui vânător de lupi (1905), Moș Gheorghe la expoziție (1912) and the short story collection Zori de iulie (1912).
