= 1918 Romanian general election =

General elections were held in Romania after the conclusion of the Treaty of Bucharest (1918) between 19 and 29 May 1918 (19, 21 and 29 May for the Chamber of Deputies and 23, 25 and 27 May for the Senate).

The National Liberal Party (PNL) boycotted the elections. In agreement with the German Empire, elections were also held in then-occupied Romania (Wallachia and parts of the Western Moldavia), with the exception of the province of Dobruja (Caliacra, Durostor, Constanța and Tulcea counties), which was ceded to Bulgaria and the Central Powers according to the Treaty of Bucharest.

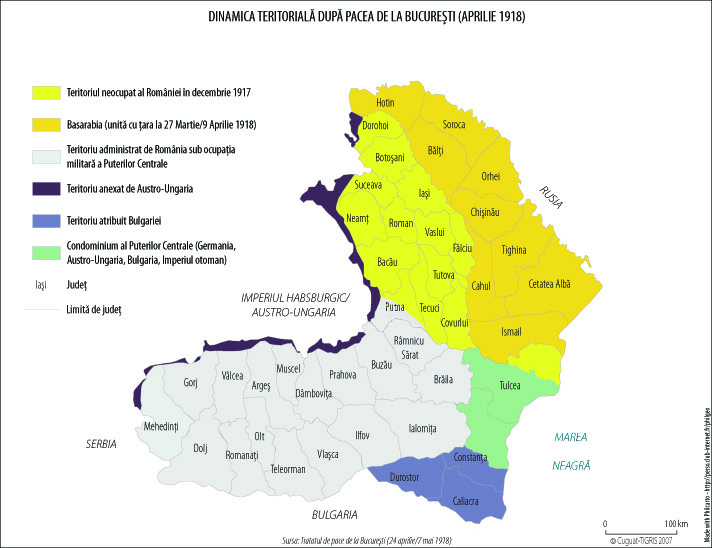
Romanian territories ceded to Austria-Hungary (purple), Bulgaria (blue), and the Central Powers (green) through the Treaty of Bucharest. Romanian territory under Central Powers' occupation depicted in grey

== Results ==
=== Chamber of Deputies ===
Party	Seats
Conservative Party–Marghiloman	165
People's League	4
Conservative Party–Carp	2
Democratic Nationalist Party	2
Labor Party	1
Total	174
Source: Buzatu

=== Senate ===
According to the Constitution, the crown prince and eight bishops had the right to sit in the Senate.

Party	Seats
Conservative Party–Marghiloman	108
Conservative Party–Carp	2
People's League	2
Total	112
Source: Buzatu
