= Viața Românească =

Romanian literary magazine

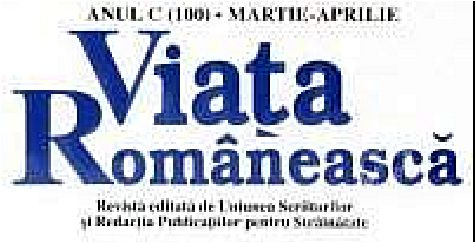
- Categories: Literary, scientific
- Format: 24x17 cm
- Founded: March 1906
- Country: Romania
- Based in: Iași
- Language: Romanian
- Website: www.viataromaneasca.eu

Viața Românească (Note: Previously spelled Viața Romînească, due to changes in the Romanian spelling system.) (Romanian: [ˈvjat͡sa romɨˈne̯askə], "The Romanian Life") is a monthly literary magazine published in Romania. Formerly the platform of the left-wing traditionalist trend known as poporanism, it is now one of the Writers' Union of Romania's main venues.

The magazine, dedicated to literary and scientific issues, was published from March 1906 to August 1916 and from September 1920 to September 1940, first in Iași and then, after 1930, in Bucharest. The magazine was under the leadership of Constantin Stere (in charge of political content), Paul Bujor and, later, Ioan Cantacuzino (for scientific matters), Garabet Ibrăileanu (until 1933), Mihai Ralea and George Călinescu (for literary matters).

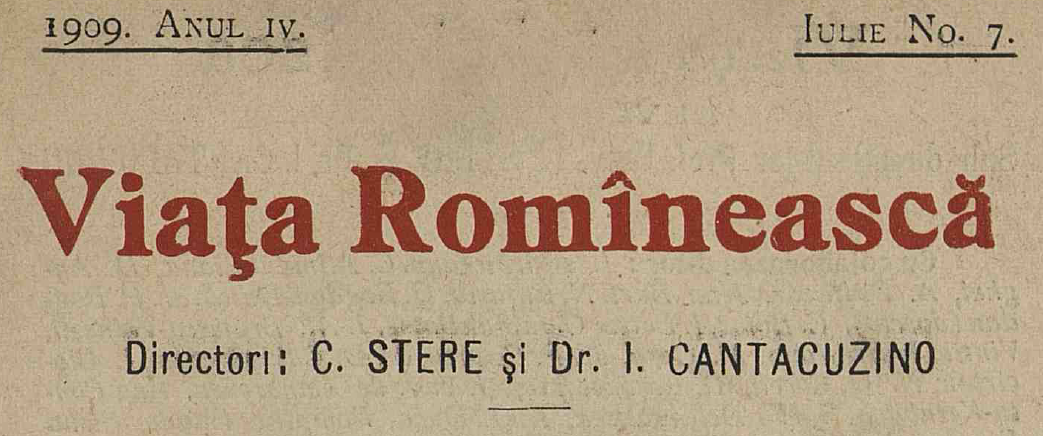
Cover of Viaţa Romînească from 1909.

Suppressed by the fascist National Legionary State in 1940, Viața Românească resumed publishing, first in a transitional form, from November 1944 to July 1946, when it was edited by Ralea. Finally, the present magazine was published from July 1948 as a monthly magazine of the Romanian Writers' Society and, from March 1949, of the Writers' Union of Romania.

== See also ==
- Florența Albu (1934 – 2000), poet
