= Peasants' Party (Romania) =

Peasants' Party Partidul Țărănesc
- Abbreviation: PȚ
- Founded: 1918
- Dissolved: 10 October 1926
- Merged into: National Peasants' Party
- Ideology: Agrarianism; Poporanism; Agrarian socialism
- Political position: Left-wing
- Colors: Green

The Peasants' Party (Romanian: Partidul Țărănesc, PȚ) was a political party in post-World War I Romania that espoused a left-wing ideology partly connected with Agrarianism and Populism and aimed to represent the interests of the Romanian peasantry. Through many of its leaders, the party was connected with Poporanism, a cultural and political trend in turn influenced by Narodnik ideas. In 1926, it united with the Romanian National Party to form the National Peasants' Party (PNȚ).

== Background ==
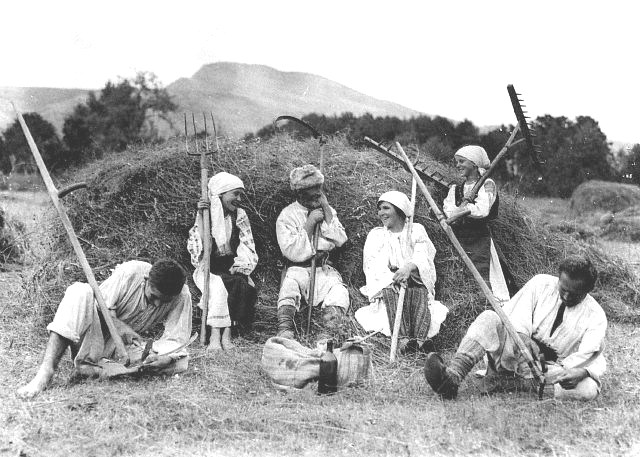
Harvest time in Romania (1920 photograph)

In the years between Romania's proclamation as a Kingdom and c. 1919, local political life had been dominated by two major parties, the National Liberals (or PNL) and the Conservatives (or PC). Romania's voting system during that time had was based on three electoral colleges that were meant to ensure and divide representation in proportion to personal wealth, with the third and proportionally smallest college reserved for peasant votes. This system was only once amended during its existence, under the PNL government of Ion Brătianu (1883), when the number of representatives of lower colleges was partly expanded (a move which contributed to the PNL's rise in popularity over the following decades). In ideological terms too, the peasants (who formed around 90% of the country's population) were generally not given a voice, as the two main parties mainly stood for the either landowners (the Conservatives) or the emerging urban elite (the National Liberals).

The problems posed by the rigid political structure were doubled by social issues culminating in the 1907 Peasants' Revolt. The land reform under Domnitor Alexandru Ioan Cuza had only partly answered the pressure of a growing landless peasantry, and it was soon rendered largely ineffectual by the rapid population growth in the rural sphere, as well as by the intransigence of Conservatives towards further land grants. In addition, Romania's Old Kingdom (Moldavia and Wallachia) kept its traditional restrictions of civil rights for persons of religions other than Eastern Orthodox, which progressively (after selective integrations) applied only to Jews (until 1923); since such a regime implied than many professions were not accessible to the non-Orthodox, the excluded communities directed their efforts towards several niches, including leasehold estates that drew hostility from landless peasants who were generally underpaid for work provided (a source for the partially antisemitic message of the 1907 revolt).

== Creation and activities ==
Although preceded by attempts to create a peasant party that would challenge the existing situation (began in the 1880s with a group around Constantin Dobrescu-Argeș, registered in 1895 as Partida Țărănească — an alternative, if antiquated, version with the same meaning of "Peasants' Party"), the PȚ was ultimately made possible by the World War itself, which Romania had entered, in 1916, on the side of the Entente. In 1917, the need for a rapid mobilization had led to King Ferdinand's promises of a new and major agricultural reform (which came about in 1921), and universal suffrage (proclaimed in 1918, it was confirmed by the 1923 Constitution as suffrage granted to all males). At the same time, the Versailles system confirmed the concept of a Greater Romania (comprising formerly Austro-Hungarian Transylvania and Bukovina, as well as the previously Russian Bessarabia), which gave way to new economic realities - an industrial base in Transylvania, and a largely enfranchised peasantry in Bessarabia (which had always been excepted from serfdom). The political foundation was shaken by the disappearance of the Conservative Party (and the fading out of conservative politics in Romania), due mainly to extended suffrage and the pro-German attitudes of the Party at the outbreak of the war. While this opened the political scene to other options, it also further solidified the PNL's supremacy for the following years, and the popularity of the Liberal leader Ion I. C. Brătianu.

The Peasants' Party was founded in Bucharest on December 18, 1918, around a group of rural intelligentsia (mainly teachers and priests) led by Ion Mihalache, "as the only political instrument ensuring the full and honest fulfilment of the peasantry's material and spiritual needs". The PȚ also described its position as "a means to protect [the peasantry] from both Bolshevism and the fate reserved to it by the boyar parties to become a governmental dowry they aim to use for their own gains". Two months later, it joined forces with the Iași-formed Laborer Party (Partidul Muncitor), which had grouped figures such as Paul Bujor, Nicolae Costăchescu, Iorgu Iordan, Ioan Borcea, Octav Băncilă, and Constantin Ion Parhon; for a while during 1919, the united party existed under the name Peasants' and Laborer Party (Partidul Țărănesc și Muncitor), before again adopting the 1918 version.

Especially considering its recent emergence, the Party registered a major success in the 1919 Parliament elections (61 seats), as well as the presidency of the Chamber and Senate (Mihalache and Bujor respectively) and positions in the cabinet of Alexandru Vaida-Voevod. However, the following period was to prove a highly problematic one for the country at large, marked by violent incidents and a succession of decreed states of siege. The first truly representative Parliament was split over the question of land reform, with the PȚ advocating more profound changes than the one promised in 1917. The situation led to the dissolving of the Parliament and the end of the Vaida-Voevod cabinet in March–April 1920.

== Alliance policy and creation of the PNȚ ==
These changes probably benefitted Ion I. C. Brătianu and his National Liberal Party. As General Alexandru Averescu (leader of a competing peasant movement, the People's Party) was charged by the King with forming his second cabinet, the PȚ leadership made public its fears that the move was merely a means for the PNL to ensure a transitional period before yet another mandate. It was isolated for a while in 1921, when Nicolae Iorga attacked the PȚ's Constantin Stere for his support of the Central Powers during the war, a criticism echoed by all political forces.

To combat the Liberal hegemony, the PȚ had already started negotiations with other opposition groups, including the Democratic Nationalist Party (with which it created the short-lived alliance known as the Federation of National-Social Democracy, 1920–1922), and the Romanian National Party (PNR). Originally the main body of representation for Romanians in Transylvania and the Banat to the legislative bodies in the Hungarian half of Austria-Hungary, the PNR had undergone a change from an umbrella group to a centre-right party under the leadership of Iuliu Maniu. After having absorbed most of the Bessarabian Peasants' Party (1921—the group had been active in the short-lived Moldavian Democratic Republic; a wing opposing the merger and led by Ion Inculeţ joined the National Liberals in 1923), the PȚ publicized an alliance with the PNR in June 1924, but the two split after just days over disagreements between Stere and the PNR.

New talks ushered in by Averescu's nomination in 1926 led to a compromise between Maniu and Mihalache. On October 10 of that year, the two parties joined into the National Peasants' Party (PNȚ). The most important points of agreement between the two groups were their rejection of the National Liberal system consecrated by the centralism, and especially the resentment of the fact that the 1923 Constitution had been adopted through a regular vote in Parliament - and not by a Constituent Assembly; the common statement on the results of the vote claimed: "this abusive gesture to be a product of the absolutist perspective on executive powers (...). Today's Assemblies (...) have deliberated and voted a so-called fundamental pact under the threat of the brutal force of machine guns and bayonets".

== Legacy ==
The Peasant Party's legacy was soon claimed by splinter groups of the PNȚ, all of which situated themselves more to the left than the latter: in early 1927, Nicolae L. Lupu formed the Peasants' Party–Lupu; Stere left the PNȚ following an inner-party clash, and founded the Democratic Peasants' Party–Stere which later merged with another dissident faction, Grigore Iunian's Radical Peasants' Party. Democratic Peasants' Party was also the name taken by a post-World War II group led by Lupu as a new dissidence (after he had rejoined the PNȚ); it was favorable to a collaboration with the Soviet Union, and adhered to alliances formed around the Romanian Communist Party.

A more left-wing tendency linked with the Peasants' Party tradition remained present and distinct within the PNȚ. It was represented by, among others Ernest Ene, Mihail Ghelmegeanu, Petre Andrei, and Armand Călinescu.

== Notable members ==
- Zamfir Arbore
- Octav Băncilă
- Ioan Borcea
- Paul Bujor
- Armand Călinescu
- Nicolae Costăchescu
- Ernest Ene
- Mihail Ghelmegeanu
- Dimitrie Gusti
- Pan Halippa
- Iorgu Iordan
- Grigore Iunian
- Nicolae L. Lupu
- Virgil Madgearu
- Ion Mihalache
- Constantin Ion Parhon
- Victor Ion Popa
- Pamfil Șeicaru
- Constantin Stere
- Adolphe Stern

== Electoral history ==
=== Legislative elections ===
| Election | Votes | % | Assembly | Senate | Position |
|---|---|---|---|---|---|
| 1919 | | | 61 / 568 | 28 / 216 | 4th |
| 1920 | | | 25 / 366 | 10 / 166 | 4th |
| 1922 | | | 40 / 372 | 11 / 148 | 2nd |
| 1926 | 16,824 | 0.7 | 0 / 387 | 0 / 115 | 8th |
