= Arthur Gorovei =

Romanian writer, folklorist and ethnographer

Arthur Gorovei (born 19 February 1864, Fălticeni – d. 19 March 1951, Bucharest) was a Romanian writer, folklorist and ethnographer. In 1940, he was elected an honorary member of the Romanian Academy.

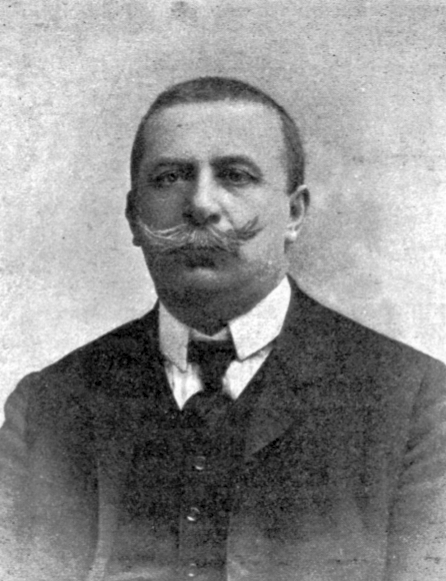
Arthur Gorovei

== Publications ==
- Cimiliturile românilor. Bucharest, C. Göbl, 1898.
- Botanica poporului roman. Falticeni, 1915 (in colaborare cu M. Lupescu);
- L'Art Roumain. Editura "Institutului International de Cooperare Intelectuala", 1922 (in colaborare cu I. Muslea si Al. Tzigara-Samurcas);
- Datorii si drepturi (lucrare premiata de Editura "Cartea Romaneasca", Bucuresti);
- Monografia orasului Botosani. 1926;
- L'Ornementation des oeufs de Paques chez les Roumains. In "Art populaire", Paris, 1930;
- Notiuni de folclor. Editura "Cartea Romaneasca", Bucuresti, 1933;
- Dr. Ioan Urban-Iarnik. In "Cunoştinte folositoare", Nr. 69, Seria C. Editura "Cartea Romaneasca", București;
- Ouăle de Paşti – Tipografia "Monitorul Oficial", Bucuresti, 1937;
- Nicu Gane – In "Cunostinte folositoare", Nr. 65, Seria C. Editura "Cartea Romaneasca", Bucuresti, 1937;
- Moş Gheorghe (novella);
- Moşneagul (novella);
- Ionică al lui Ion (short story);
- Ţiganul (short story) -. In "Cuget Clar", Nr. 29, 27 Ianuarie 1938;
- Sbuciumul unui suflet nou (novel). Editura "Cartea Romaneasca", Bucuresti, 1939;
- Vopsitul prin buruieni. In "Cunostinte folositoare". Editura "Cartea Romaneasca", Bucuresti, 1939;
- O farsă a lui Vlahuţă, Buldogele Venetiei (f.a.d.).
