= Land reform in Romania =

Four major land reforms have taken place in Romania: in 1864, 1921, 1945 and 1991. The first sought to undo the feudal structure that had persisted after the unification of the Danubian Principalities in 1859; the second, more drastic reform, tried to resolve lingering peasant discontent and create social harmony after the upheaval of World War I and extensive territorial expansion; the third, imposed by a mainly Communist government, did away with the remaining influence of the landed aristocracy but was itself soon undone by collectivisation (considered by some as yet another land reform), which the fourth then unravelled, leading to almost universal private ownership of land today.

== 1864 reform ==
The 1864 land reform was the first of its kind in Romania, taking place during the reign of Alexandru Ioan Cuza. It came on the heels of the secularization of monastery estates, achieved in December 1863 on Mihail Kogălniceanu's initiative and taking over a quarter of the country's area away from the Orthodox Church. The question of land reform was an essential point of Cuza's political programme, and he and Kogălniceanu had wider aims: the abolition of compulsory labour and the establishment of private small holdings. Conservative landowners expressed opposition in Parliament, leading to a bitter political struggle culminating in its dissolution in the coup of 2 May 1864. The draft law was written by the Council of State, amended by the Government and promulgated by the prince on 14/26 August 1864. His proclamation announced to the peasants: "The corvée is forever abolished and you are henceforth free proprietors in the places subjected to your control". The law freed peasants from feudal tasks: the corvée, the tithe, the transport tax and maintenance days; it did away with feudal monopolies in the villages, at the same time specifying that compensation would be paid to the owners.

Thus, for 15 years, in order to defray the cost of their no longer performing the corvée and the other feudal duties, peasants were required to pay into an indemnity fund that issued bonds redeemable in instalments an annual fee of 51–133 lei, depending on their category and region; this was a heavy burden for the majority and ruined the poorest. They also had to pay for the land they now owned, albeit at a price below market value. The quantity of expropriated land was not to exceed two-thirds of the domains' area (the boyars kept the best third, taking advantage of a provision calling for the consolidation, wherever possible, of pastures, hayfields and arable plots scattered by successive inheritances in order to get rid of their poorest quality land) and selling or mortgaging the lots was forbidden for 30 years, after which the village commune could exercise its right of pre-emption. This reform gave 1,654,965 hectares (6,389.86 square miles) of land to 406,429 peasants; another 60,651 received lots only for a house and garden. Later, 48,432 additional families of newlyweds (who did not come under the law's provisions but were permitted to settle on state-owned lands near their village) received 228,329 ha (881.58 sq mi). Implementation of the law was by and large complete by 1865 but was slowed by a lack of comprehensive regulations concerning both general procedures and special cases; moreover, friction between landlords and peasants ensued because the latter had no confidence in the private surveyors hired by landlords to delimit their new holdings from the rest of the estate. In the year following 1864, agricultural production stagnated or even fell in some regions, partly because many owners had done nothing to compensate for the loss of the corvée, and also because many peasants did not know what land would be theirs and were reluctant to raise crops that might not be theirs, but by the spring of 1866 production once again rose. After the reform, land owned by peasants (that is, former corvée members, free peasants and small proprietors) covered around 30% of the national territory, with 70% still in state or landlord hands. The reform had important social consequences, giving the peasants a civic motivation and assuring them a means of subsistence; it was also enshrined in the 1866 Constitution.

Nevertheless, three factors undermined the reform. First, too little land was assigned to too many candidates even though many farmers were excluded from the redistribution and went on working in semi-serfdom on the boyars' estates. Second, demographic increase caused devastating rural overpopulation. Third, inheritance practices based on equally divided portions led to deep property fragmentation. Thus, the new landowners quickly ran into debt and because of the inadequate banking system had to borrow from boyars, large tenants or usurers at exorbitant interest rates. Instead, some peasants transferred the land back to the former owners and continued working it essentially as before. This new system of dependency prompted by the lack of arable land and pasture was dubbed "neo-serfdom" (neoiobăgie) by the Marxist theorist Constantin Dobrogeanu-Gherea. Moreover, forests, essential for many households' economic well-being, were excluded from distribution; peasants could use them for fifteen years, after which the landlord could reclaim his property rights to them. The reform also gave rise to political clash: the Liberals saw it as a starting point for dynamic, reasoned change, while the majority of Conservatives tried to use the 1864 law to defend their property against further expropriation, believing the social question had been resolved.

By 1913, Romania was the world's fourth-largest wheat exporter, but the issue of inequitable land distribution became persistently troublesome (and indeed was exacerbated that year when Romanian peasants fought in the Second Balkan War, witnessing first-hand the far more equitable land distribution scheme in place in Bulgaria). In the late 19th century about 2,000 landowners controlled over half the land while peasants (with little representation in government as well as limited access to land and ownership rights) had just a third. In 1888 peasant discontent with inequitable land distribution resulted in bloody confrontations that brought about partial and ineffective agrarian reforms. The unequal system continued to drive the peasantry into bankruptcy and seemed to lead increasingly toward a system of absentee ownership. Almost two decades later, a second, more violent episode took place: the 1907 Romanian Peasants' Revolt, which almost caused a full-blown revolution and led to the deaths of several thousand peasants once the army intervened. As a consequence, the government introduced new legislation in 1907-08 to benefit the peasants, including a new law on agricultural contracts and a law establishing a rural credit bank (Casa Rurală) intended to facilitate purchases and leases, transferring property from large landowners to peasants. However, these laws (influenced by the poporanist trend of Constantin Stere) were poorly enforced, a wholly inadequate amount of land was made available for purchase and the vast majority of the peasantry did not even qualify for most of the assistance made available.

== 1921 reform ==
The 1921 land reform was the second great distribution of land in Romanian history, the largest measure of its kind in Eastern Europe in its day. On 23 March/5 April 1917, at the height of World War I, King Ferdinand promised there would be a substantial increase in the number of new property owners (as well as universal male suffrage). He undertook this commitment as a way of repaying the soldiers and their families for sacrifices made, but also sought to mobilise them to hold the front and avoid revolution–the announcement came just weeks after the February Revolution toppled Russia's tsar. The reform was preceded by a number of decisions adopted between 1917 and 1920. In order to give it a legal basis, the two chambers of Parliament decided to modify article 19 of the 1866 Constitution. The provision, which formerly declared "property of any nature" to be "sacred and inviolable" (and was adopted mainly to protect against new agrarian reform), had the following text added: "because of national necessity, the extension of rural peasant properties is advanced through the expropriation of arable lands, with the intent of selling them to the peasants". On 20 March 1920 the rural law for Bessarabia was adopted; followed by similar provisions for Muntenia, Oltenia, Moldavia, and Dobruja on 17 July 1921, and on 30 July 1921 for Transylvania, Banat, Crișana, Maramureș, and Bukovina. One law was passed for each region owing to their very different socioeconomic structures, relations and specific contexts. The PNR government of Alexandru Vaida-Voevod had a fully comprehensive land reform programme, but on 13 March 1920 the King dismissed this cabinet despite its backing by a substantial parliamentary majority, a clear sign that the Bucharest-based elite would try and govern the enlarged state by traditional methods; in 1922, Ion Mihalache of the PŢ (who as agriculture minister had drafted the first proposal) blasted the ensuing reform as a "kind of safety valve" whereby "the ruling class made only such concessions as were necessary to assure its own existence". As adopted, the reform was a Liberal-Conservative bargain, decided upon in private by Ion Brătianu and Take Ionescu, who persuaded the former to abandon his intention of expropriating the soil. Ultimately, all classes had come to see the futility and even danger of trying to preserve the old system. Many conservatives hoped efficiency and productivity would improve; liberals backed the measure on principle but also desired that agriculture served the needs of industry; and agrarianists dreamt of creating a peasant state on the basis of these changes. The threat of social upheaval from below and the need to maintain national solidarity in the face of irredentist neighbours also contributed to the enactment of reform.

The distribution of land to the peasants was achieved by expropriating the estates of foreign citizens, of absentee landowners (those who did not work their own land), arable land belonging to the Crown Domains and to Casa Rurală, land leased to tenants (arendași) for over five years, floodplains, etc. Expropriated parcels measured over 150, 300 or, in certain cases, 500 ha. The total area of expropriated land came to 5,804,837.83 hectares (22,000 sq mi), of which some 3.7 million ha were arable, while 1,393,383 peasants received property (648,843 in the Old Kingdom, 310,583 in Transylvania, 357,016 in Bessarabia and 76,941 in Bukovina). The technical part of the reform–measuring the land subject to expropriation and parcelling it out to individuals–was very slow: by 1927 only about half the land from estates subject to the process had been measured, and of this, around 1,100,000 ha (4,200 sq mi) had been divided for distribution, which continued into the 1930s. After the land reform, large landowners (moșieri) owned 10.4% of the country's arable surface, compared to 47.7% before. Small holdings rose from 52.3% to 89.6% of total arable land. Former owners received reimbursements in long-term bonds, and peasants were to repay 65% of the expropriation costs over 20 years.

In Transylvania, large landowners were almost exclusively Hungarian, while those to whom land was distributed were largely, though not exclusively, Romanian. Land reform was carried out with considerably less zeal in the Old Kingdom, where landlords as well as peasants were Romanian; in Transylvania (and Bessarabia, where many large estates were Russian-owned), the new authorities saw reform as a means of increasing the titular nationality's dominance. Small landowners of Hungarian descent also experienced unequal application of the reforms; some were expropriated ostensibly in order to build a church or a school. The "Hungarian" churches (Roman Catholic, Reformed and Unitarian) were also weakened, losing some 85% of their lands, the income from which had supported their educational and charitable undertakings. Hungarians and Saxons reacted loudly against the measures, their leaders persistently denouncing what they saw as shady and sometimes openly corrupt methods whereby land reform was used to modify the area's ethnic makeup. (Notably, a reverse process had occurred from the end of the 19th century until World War I. The Hungarian government established a special fund to aid ethnic Hungarian farmers settle in Transylvanian districts with a significant non-Hungarian population, bringing in settlers from other regions if necessary and granting them privileges. This gave rise to a desire for retaliation among Transylvania's Romanians, achieved through the postwar agrarian reform.) In Bukovina, land reform was not markedly different from the Old Kingdom's; smallholdings grew by 28% and large estates were limited to 250 ha of arable land. However, large landowners were not required to give up their substantial forests, and arable land was scarce in relation to population density. In Bessarabia, where Sfatul Țării voted to unite with Romania on 27 March/9 April 1918, land reform (also viewed as a sine qua non by Romanians in Transylvania and Bukovina) was attached as a prerequisite for union because it was already underway there but only theoretical in Romania. However, after implementing its own reform, Sfatul Țării proclaimed union without conditions on 27 November/10 December.

The reform managed to subdivide private property into small pieces and create a certain equilibrium between former and new owners, leading to increased social stability, but the land's productivity did not experience substantial growth due to the rudimentary farming methods still employed. Average plots were 3.8 ha in size, less than the 5 ha needed for economic independence; the reform also suffered from corruption and protracted lawsuits. Ignorance, overpopulation, lack of farm implements and draft animals, too few rural credit institutions and excessive land fragmentation, exacerbated as the population grew, kept many peasants in poverty and yields inferior. Fewer pasturelands and forests, necessary for economic viability, were expropriated: by 1927, just 23% of the country's natural pastures and meadows had been distributed as common pastures, while only 12% of forests were ever distributed. The 1930 census found that 6,700 landowners held 24% of the land while 2.5 million farmers had 28%. Right before World War II, 8% of landowners still had about half the land, and in 1938 the country had just 4,039 tractors, implying one machine per 2,490 ha. Irrigated land, fertilizers, chemicals, seed and breeding stock were in similarly dismal supply.

== 1945 reform ==
The 1945 land reform was the first important political and economic act after the coup of 23 August 1944, achieved by the new Petru Groza government on the basis of decree-law nr. 187/23 March 1945 for the realisation of land reform. The Romanian Communist Party (PCR) planned and applied the reform, also exploiting it for propaganda purposes in an attempt to form a popular base on the Soviet model (there too, collectivisation was preceded by land distribution). Its purpose, as the law's preamble declared, was to increase the size of arable surfaces of peasant holdings with less than 5 ha of land, to create new individual peasant holdings for landless agricultural labourers, to establish vegetable gardens at the outskirts of cities and industrial localities, and to reserve parcels for agricultural schools and experimental farms. Expropriation targeted land and farm property belonging to German citizens and Romanians who had collaborated with Nazi Germany during World War II, land and farm property belonging to "war criminals" and to those "guilty of the national disaster", lands of those who sought refuge in countries with which Romania was at war or who fled abroad after 23 August 1944, and of those who in the preceding 7 years had failed to cultivate their own holdings, goods belonging to those who had voluntarily registered to fight against the Allies, property belonging to physical persons that exceeded 50 ha (arable land, orchards, hayfields, pastures, ponds, dam lakes, marshes and floodplains). With all large properties remaining after the 1921 reform eliminated, the aristocracy was deprived of its economic base and final remnants of power, as were the wealthy German and Hungarian churches (Reformed, Unitarian and Lutheran).

After the reform was announced, people who owned over 50 ha (120 acres) suffered the most, being subjected to intense pressure from the authorities and from Communist agitators, who from the end of 1944 had begun instigating peasants to occupy domains by force. Transylvanian Saxons and Banat Swabians were indiscriminately targeted, destroying many communities, but monastery, church, and rural cooperative holdings, as well as those belonging to cultural and charitable organisations, escaped expropriation: the struggle for power was still ongoing and the Communists dared not alienate peasants, clergy and hostile intellectuals. Although the law specified that individuals whose land was expropriated received no compensation, the beneficiaries of the distribution had to pay for the land, albeit at an advantageous price (the cost of one hectare was fixed at the annual average value of what one hectare produced; at the time the land was received, the peasant paid an advance of 10%, the rest being paid in the following 10–20 years). This fee was not burdensome but instead formed part of a government strategy to convince the peasants that their possession of the land was definitive; all mention of collectivisation was avoided. The reform increased the PCR's popularity among the peasantry, but the growth was slight and temporary, so that the party still resorted to fraud in rural areas during the 1946 election. According to an official communiqué from January 1947, of 1,443,911 ha (5,574.97 sq mi) expropriated from 143,219 owners, 1,057,674 ha were distributed to peasants, while 387,565 ha became state reserves. 726,129 families owning under 5 ha received land, the average lot measuring 1.3 ha. New data were released on 13 April 1948: 917,777 families had received a total of 1,109,562 ha of land (an average of 1.21 ha). Completed in spring 1948, the reform did not significantly alter the structure of agriculture: holdings remained as fragmented as before, production of non-grain crops and animals declined, the co-operative movement was neglected, and the amount of land received by families was so small that their economic and social status hardly changed. In any event, the peasants did not long enjoy their new properties, as collectivisation was launched in 1949.

== 1991 reform ==
The February 1991 land reform, which followed the Romanian Revolution of 1989, sought to privatise land resources that were in state hands during the Communist period. The goal was to restitute land in state cooperatives to its pre-collectivisation owners, with families that did not own land at the time also receiving small allotments. Amidst an anti-Communist public mood of 1990–91, the restored interwar parties (PNL and PNȚCD) loudly called for restitution; initially, the governing ex-Communist National Salvation Front resisted the demand and sought to grant all rural residents 0.5 ha (1.2 acres), but in a bid to capture the rural vote, it gave in to pressure to dismantle the collectives, although capping the size of restored properties to 10 ha (25 acres). (The Front claimed this would promote social equity, with others claiming a political motivation: the recreation of a viable, propertied middle class in agriculture, one that could exert certain kinds of pressure on the state, was precluded.) In addition to righting a perceived historical injustice, the reform also pleased Romanian farmers, who have a long tradition of working their own land and are tied to it not only for subsistence needs but also out of sentiment (for instance because their ancestors retained it through fighting in wars). Given that many families still held legal title as evidence of their claim to the land, and retained a clear memory of where their plots were located (a memory kept alive during Communism), failure to restitute risked creating significant social unrest. As well, given the relatively egalitarian land structure prevailing in 1949, historical justice (emphasised by the opposition) coincided with the social equity considerations that preoccupied the government.

Before the reform, 411 state farms and 3,776 cooperatives exploited almost all the country's arable land resources; in 1991, about 65% of this land–belonging to cooperatives–was restored to former owners or their heirs. About 3.7 million peasant households repossessed land, deciding to exploit it either individually or in associations. Peasants farms (the norm) were small, subsistence-based units of 2 to 3 ha each; family association farms covered 100 ha, and agricultural companies' farms were 500 ha in area. Reform of state farms, tangled in politics, was slower: in 1997, 60% of the area was taken up by peasant farms, 10% by family associations and 14% by agricultural companies, but state farms still accounted for 16%. By 2004, however, privatisation was largely complete, with the private sector representing 97.3% of production value that year (97.4% of vegetable production and 98.9% of animal production); plans are in place to sell off the remainder of state-owned farmland. Out of 2,387,600 ha (9,219 sq mi) initially held by the state, 1,704,200 were returned based on Law 18/1991 and Law 1/2000; 574,600 were leased; and 108,800 were in the process of being leased at the end of 2004.
