= 1866 Constitution of Romania =

Constitution of Romania
- Created: 13 July [O.S. 1 July] 1866
- Ratified: 13 July [O.S. 1 July] 1866
- Signatories: Carol I
- Purpose: Replace the Statutul Desvoltător al Convenţiei de la Paris as Constitution of the Principality of Romania

The 1866 Constitution of Romania was the fundamental law that capped a period of nation-building in the Danubian Principalities, which had united in 1859. Drafted in a short time and closely modeled on the 1831 Constitution of Belgium, then considered Europe's most liberal, it was substantially modified by Prince (later King) Carol and adopted by the Constituent Assembly. The newly installed Prince then promulgated it on 13 July [O.S. 1 July] 1866. In a bold move, the constitution was drafted without input from the major powers. Notably, the framers did not even consult the Ottoman Empire even though Romania was nominally an Ottoman vassal. By then, however, the Ottoman Empire's sovereignty over Romania had long since become a legal fiction, though this only ended when Romania gained de jure independence in 1878.

== Outline ==
The document proclaimed Romania a constitutional monarchy. Like its Belgian counterpart, it was bourgeois-liberal in character, declaring that the government was organised on the basis of separation of powers and on the principle of national sovereignty. The throne was a hereditary office of the male descendants of Carol, "perpetually excluding women and their descendants." The Prince's person was proclaimed "inviolable." He was the head of the army, named and dismissed ministers, sanctioned and promulgated laws, named and confirmed men to all public functions, and signed treaties and conventions on commerce and navigation with foreign countries. He had the right to grant political amnesty, to pardon criminals or reduce their sentences, to confer military ranks and decorations, and coin money. At the same time, he opened and closed sessions of Parliament, which he could convoke in emergency session and which he could dissolve.

Legislative power was exercised by the Prince and Parliament (composed of an Assembly of Deputies and a Senate). Following the Belgian model, executive power was entrusted to the Prince, but he was not responsible for exercising it. Rather, the Prince exercised his powers through the ministers; his acts were only valid if countersigned by a minister, who then became politically responsible for the act in question. The political regime was liberal but not democratic; elections were held with a limited franchise; voters, all men, were divided into four colleges based on their wealth and social origins.

Citizens' rights and freedoms were of the most modern vintage: enshrined in the document were the freedom of conscience, of the press, of assembly, of religion; equality before the law, regardless of class; individual liberty; inviolability of the home. Capital punishment was abolished in peacetime, while property was considered sacred and inviolable. The Romanian Orthodox Church was accorded superior status ("the dominant religion of the Romanian state"), while article 7 provided that non-Christians could not become citizens (which chiefly affected Jews). The Constitution also did little to advance the position of women.

In 1879, under Western pressure, article 7 was ostensibly diluted but in fact it remained nearly impossible for Jews to gain citizenship. In 1881, the constitution was amended to proclaim Romania a kingdom, and the word "prince" was replaced by the word "king." In 1884, the number of electoral colleges was reduced to three, thus expanding the franchise. In 1917, the Constitution underwent two major modifications in order to fulfill promised made to the soldiers then fighting World War I: the college-based electoral system was abolished, and the right to property weakened so that land reform could be carried out. It remained in effect until it was replaced by the 1923 Constitution.

== Elections ==
Although every adult male could vote, the value of their vote was strongly tilted towards the wealthiest.

As of 1909, the Chamber of Deputies was divided into three colleges, based on incomes and wealth:

- College I (comprising 41% of the deputies) was elected directly by 1.5% of the voters, property owners who had incomes of at least 1200 lei
- College II (comprising 38% of the deputies) was elected directly by 3.5% of the voters, city dwellers and professionals paying an annual tax of at least 20 lei
- College III (comprising 21% of the deputies) was elected directly by 4% of the voters, literate rural property owners who had incomes between 300 and 1200 lei, as well as teachers and priests
- in the College III, also voted indirectly the rest of 91% of the voters, through delegates who represented 50 voters.

The Senate gave even more power to the large property owners, while 98% of the voters were not represented at all:

- College I (comprising 55% of the senators) was elected by 1% of the voters, who had incomes of at least 2000 lei or were high-level functionaries or held advanced degrees and had a certain number of professional employment.
- College II (comprising 45% of the senators) was elected by another 1% of the voters, who had incomes of at between 800 and 2000 lei or held advanced degrees or were professionals.

Under the constitution, the Prince/King appointed the prime minister, who then organized elections. The government was this well positioned to ensure it won a majority. This resulted in a situation where Parliament reflected the will of the government, not vice versa as is the case in a true parliamentary democracy.

== Bibliography ==
- Hitchins, Keith (2014). A Concise History of Romania. Cambridge: Cambridge University Press. ISBN 978-0-521-69413-1.
- Eidelberg, Philip Gabriel (1974). The Great Rumanian Peasant Revolt of 1907: Origins of a Modern Jacquerie. Brill Publishers. ISBN 90-04-03781-0.
- Stoica, Stan, coordinator, (2007). Dicţionar de Istorie a României, p. 88–9. Bucharest: Editura Merona.
