= Ioan Cantacuzino =

Romanian physician and bacteriologist

Ion Cantacuzino
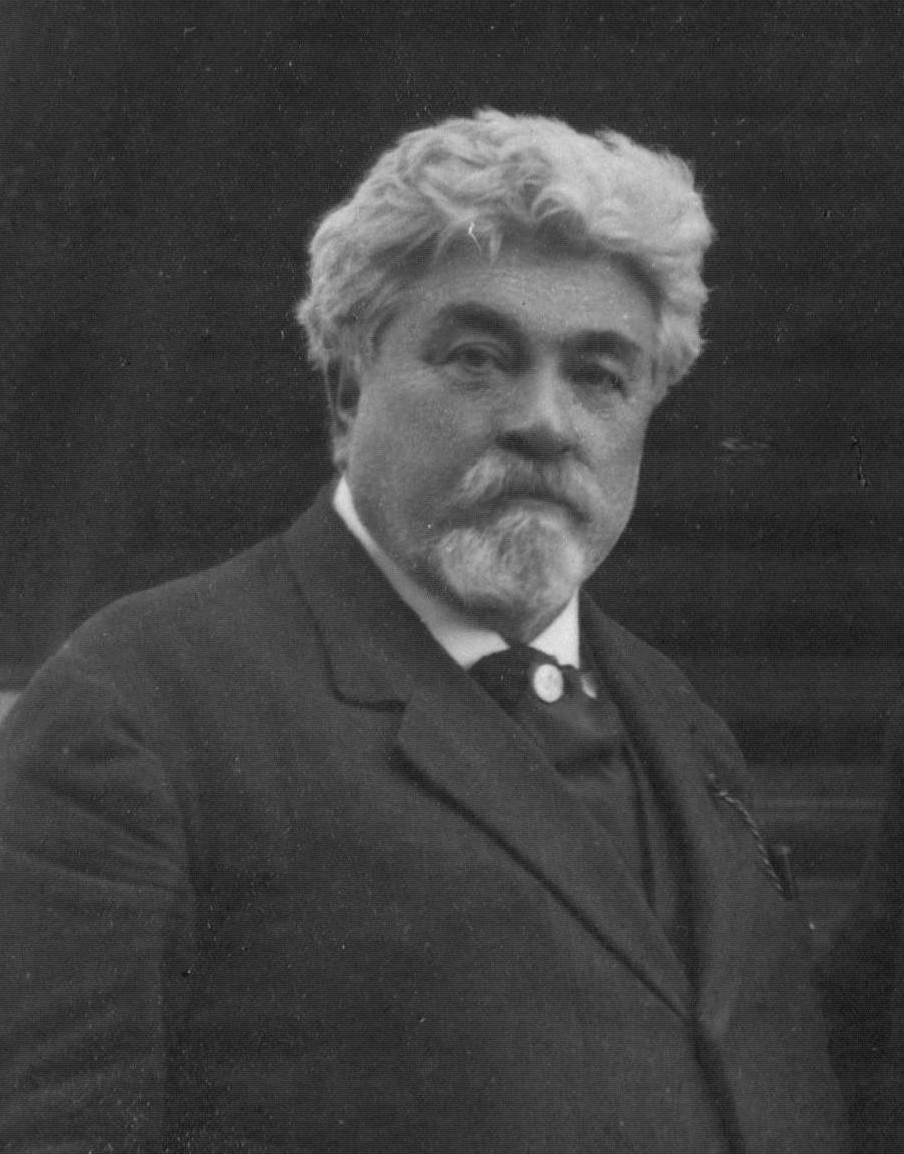
- Cantacuzino in 1931
- Born: November 25, 1863; Bucharest, Romanian United Principalities
- Died: January 14, 1934 (aged 70); Bucharest, Romania
- Citizenship: Romania
- Education: Lycee Louis-le-Grand; University of Paris
- Scientific career
- Fields: Pathology; Bacteriology; Microbiology; Immunology; Entomology
- Workplaces: Pasteur Institute; Faculty of Medicine, University of Bucharest; Cantacuzino Institute; Romanian Academy; Viața Românească

Minister of Health of Romania
- In office 18 April 1931 – 5 June 1932
- Monarch: Carol II of Romania
- Prime Minister: Nicolae Iorga

Member of the Senate of Romania
- In office 1931–1932

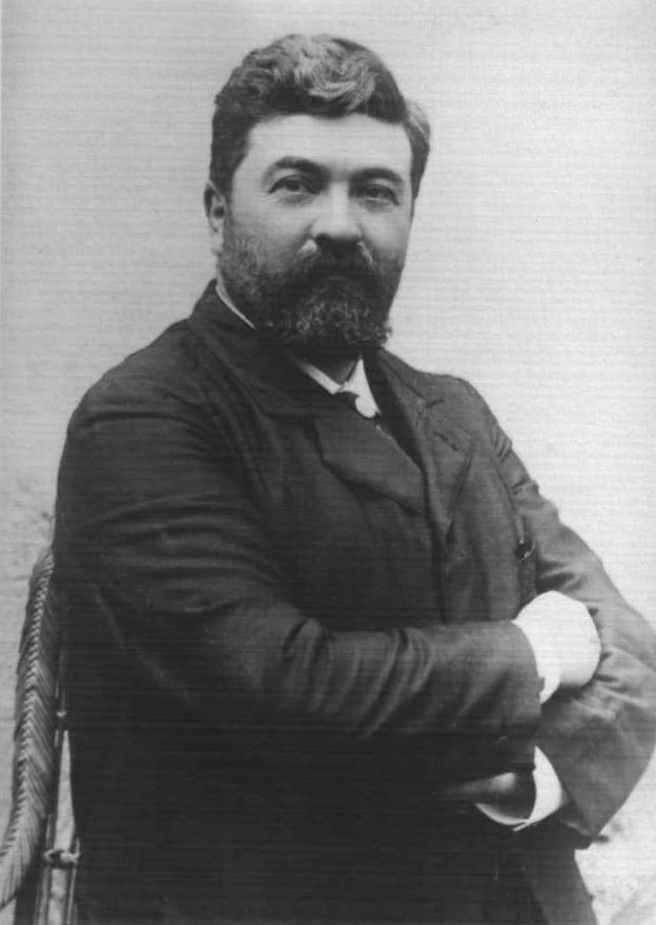
Ioan Cantacuzino

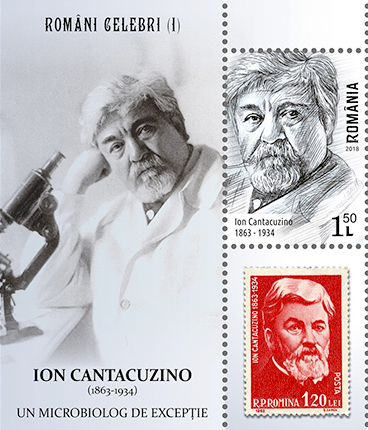
Cantacuzino on a 2018 stamp sheet of Romania

Ioan I. Cantacuzino (Romanian pronunciation: [iˈo̯aŋ kantakuziˈno]; also Ion Cantacuzino; 25 November 1863 – 14 January 1934) was a renowned Romanian physician and bacteriologist, a professor at the School of Medicine and Pharmacy of the University of Bucharest, and a titular member of the Romanian Academy. He established the fields of microbiology and experimental medicine in Romania, and founded the Cantacuzino Institute.

== Early days ==
He was born in Bucharest as a member of the Cantacuzino family and the son of Ion C. Cantacuzino. After attending the Lycée Louis-le-Grand in Paris, he graduated from the University of Paris' Faculty of Sciences and Faculty of Medicine, and worked at several hospitals in Paris. He obtained his doctorate in 1894, with thesis Recherches sur le mode de destruction du vibrion cholérique dans l'organisme. Later in the same year, he began his academic career as a deputy professor at the University of Iași, and returned to Paris after two years to serve on the staff of the Pasteur Institute, where he worked under the direction of Ilya Ilyich Mechnikov.

== Career ==
In 1901, Cantacuzino was assigned a teaching position in Bucharest, where he became a major influence on a generation of scientists. His discoveries were relevant in the treatment of cholera, epidemic typhus, tuberculosis, and scarlet fever. As a disciple of Mechnikov, he devoted part of his research to expanding on the latter's field of interest (phagocytes, the body's means of defence against pathogens, as well as the issue of immunity and invertebrates). He invented the notion of contact immunity.

During the Second Balkan War, Cantacuzino was appointed head of the staff combatting the cholera epidemic in the ranks of the Romanian Army stationed in Bulgaria; he was assigned to the same position during the Romanian campaign in World War I, in the fight against typhus. He founded and led the scientific magazines Revista Științelor Medicale and Archives roumaines de pathologie expérimentale, and regularly contributed to the literary magazine Viața Românească (replacing Paul Bujor on the editorial board). A collaborator of Constantin Stere, he was noted as a Poporanist disciple of Constantin Dobrogeanu-Gherea.

Between 1931 and 1932, he served as Minister of Work and Health in the Iorga cabinet. He was also a member of the Senate of Romania, elected in 1931.

== Family ==
Ioan Cantacuzino married Elena Balş (1866-1945). They had two sons, Ioan (also known as Jean, 1897-1985) and Alexandru Ioan (1901-1980). The latter, also a scientist, married Marianne Labeyrie (1905-1971), elder daughter of Émile Labeyrie who was Governor of the Bank of France in 1936-1937. Their son Ion, born in Bucharest in 1933, studied physics in France where he went by Jean Michel (or simply Jean) Cantacuzène. He was science attaché at the French Embassy in Moscow in 1962-1964 and held the same role at the Embassy of France in Washington DC from 1977 to 1980, then became Chief Science Officer at Compagnie Française des Pétroles, and later at Ciments Français. He authored several books, including a history of the Cantacuzino family.
