= Poporanism =

Romanian nationalist and populist political philosophy

Poporanism is a Romanian version of nationalism and populism.

The word is derived from popor, meaning "people" in Romanian. Founded by Constantin Stere in the early 1890s, Poporanism is distinguished by its opposition to Marxism, promotion of voting rights for all and its intent to reform the Parliament and the farming system.

Regarding Romania's agrarian situation, Poporanists wished to form co-operative farms for the peasants and to remove them from aristocratic control. Unlike Junimism, another popular political philosophy, Poporanism focused mainly on expanding the power of the peasants. In a very nationalist manner, it was also a champion of the Romanian language and of maintaining the Romanian spirit.

Several famous Romanians, including Ion Agârbiceanu and Ioan Cantacuzino, supported it.

== Narodism and Constantin Dobrogeanu-Gherea ==
Constantin Dobrogeanu-Gherea, a Romanian political activist, first introduced the Russian ideas of Narodism to Romania and supported the ideas of Poporanism. The fundamental philosophy of Narodism had a lasting impact on Poporanism, spurring its rejection of capitalism and of Marxist ideas. However, unlike Narodists, Stere did not believe that a revolution was necessary in Romania. Later, Dobrogeanu-Gherea and Stere had a split of political philosophy in regards to antisemitism and liberalism, and Dobrogeanu-Gherea formed the Social Democratic Worker’s Party, and Poporanists joined the National Liberal Party.

== See also ==
- Christian Democratic National Peasants' Party
- Labor Party
- National Peasants' Party
- Narodniks
- Peasants' Party
- Popular socialism
