= Dumitru Theodor Neculuță =

Romanian poet and socialist activist

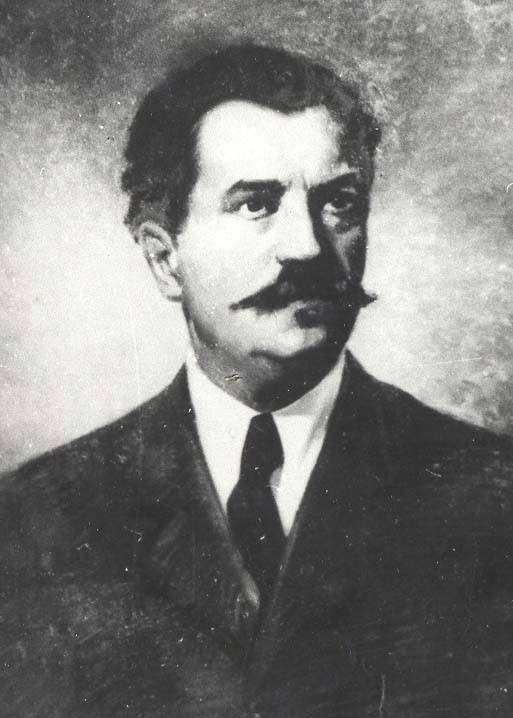
- Photograph of Neculuță
- Born: October 3 [O.S. September 20] 1859; Târgu Frumos, United Principalities
- Died: October 17, 1904 (aged 45); Bucharest, Kingdom of Romania
- Occupations: Shoemaker, journalist, activist
- Writing career
- Pen name: D. Azur, D. Niculescu
- Period: ca. 1880–1904
- Genres: Lyric poetry, sonnet, pastiche
- Movement: Proletarian literature

Dumitru Theodor Neculuță (also known as Neculiță and Dumitru a Ciubotăriții; October 3 [O.S. September 20] 1859 – October 17, 1904) was a Romanian poet, socialist activist, and artisan shoemaker. Born to a poor family in Western Moldavia, he was not allowed to pursue his passion for music, and worked from an early age. These circumstances instilled him with a desire to combat the established social order of the Romanian Kingdom, driving him into left-wing politics. His interest in music was replaced with a poetic calling: stylistically, Neculuță followed a tradition upheld by Mihai Eminescu and George Coșbuc, which he infused with the tenets of Marxism and his own experience of acute poverty. He wrote for many decades, but was only published from 1894. In parallel, he established his profile as a "poet-activist" for the Social Democratic Workers' Party and its more radically progressive faction, spending his final years as a co-chair of the România Muncitoare in Bucharest.

After his unexpected death at age 45, Neculuță enjoyed a cult following in socialist culture in both the Romanian Kingdom and neighboring Austria-Hungary. He had shared inspiration and themes with George Bacovia, and was a direct influence on Mihail Cruceanu and Cristian Sârbu. During the interwar, he was celebrated by the legal Social Democrats and Socialist Laborites, as well as by the underground Romanian Communist Party; his cultivation sometimes drew suspicion from Romania's right-wing governments. Public gatherings were held at his commemoration date in October, including one in 1924, which ended with a roundup by Romanian Police.

Socialist circles upheld Neculuță as a forerunner of "proletarian literature", but he was largely regarded as a minor author in more official contexts. This contrast was overturned in the late 1930s, when Neculuță was openly celebrated by the National Renaissance Front; it was also resumed in full after 1948, when the communist regime took over, making Neculuță a posthumous member of the Romanian Academy. The move, as well as his inclusion in literary textbooks, were contested by various regime critics, who regarded them as incoherent or distasteful. The regime itself scaled down such promotion from the 1960s, returning Neculuță to a more modest position in its literary pantheon. The literary community remains divided between those who regard Neculuță as a genuine poet, who was overvalued for political reasons, and those who dismiss him as mediocre and argue that his reputation was entirely fabricated.

== Biography ==
=== Beginnings ===
As noted by philologist Katalin Kese, Neculuță was born shortly after the 1859 unification between Moldavia and Wallachia. A native of Târgu Frumos in Moldavia, his parents were Toader Neculuță and Zamfira a Ciubotăriții. Some sources suggest that they were both poor peasants, though, according to biographer Mihu Dragomir, this is an erroneous information originating with Neculuță's confidant, Alecu Constantinescu, who misunderstood references to his friend's more distant rural background. Records of the period show that Toader was in fact a shoemaker. A similar confusion surrounds the issue of Dumitru's original surname, with some sources noting that he was first registered with his matronymic, a Ciubotăriții or Aciubotăriții, literally "of the cobbler's wife". Essayist Florentin Popescu suggests that "Neculuță" can be viewed as a pen name, favored over "a Ciubotăriții" for stylistic reasons. Popescu also notes that this choice was unusual, since his original surname "made it blatantly clear that he had a very 'healthy' [proletarian] origin". Dragomir, who originally credited this claim, withdrew it in 1959, upon discovering that the poet was in fact known from birth as either Neculuță or Neculiță.

During his earliest years with his father in Târgu Frumos, Dumitru probably picked up a hostility toward organized religion. This was argued by Dragomir, who recounts that Toader Neculuță made a point of not going to confession in his local Orthodox church after 1864: "If we note that back then D. Neculuță was a five-year-old, we can easily conclude that, in his parental home, the child had not been pressured into respecting bourgeois institutions." The boy was passionate about music and had hopes of becoming a violinist; the circumstances of his birth made it impossible that he would afford tuition, and instead he was pushed to earn a living from age ten, working as a shoemaker's apprentice. His formal education was limited to two grades of primary school. His father dead, and raised by his mother in "great poverty", he ran away to seek his fortune in the former Moldavian capital, Iași. Journalist G. Spina also notes that Neculuță spent time wandering through the Eastern Carpathians, and also that he was for a while a tutor, "paid by the hour", for schoolchildren in Iași's slums. He was working in Iași around the time when Romanian poetry was being revolutionized by Eminescu; Neculuță's first-ever works were pastiches from Eminescu, with similar borrowings from Romanian folklore.

Neculuță was drawn into radical politics from an early age—at some point, he confessed to Constantinescu that "I was born a revolutionary; I feel within me the hatred of so many generations of proletarians". Proudly self-taught, he was familiarized with the work of Karl Marx, but also kept up with non-political literature. Uninterested in the Symbolist movement, he read from Eminescu and the classics of poetry—including Homer, Virgil, and William Shakespeare; he also knew the prose of realists such as Honoré de Balzac and Émile Zola. His friend A. Costin recalled in 1905 that Neculuță would spend his Christmas savings on books and plain bread, mocking party-goers; Neculuță also reportedly complained whenever he had to sell parts of his personal library, noting that "everything in today's society goes against men who seek to enlighten themselves!" He made his debut in print in 1894, when Icoana Vremii magazine took up some of his writings, which he signed as "D. Niculescu".

As Deșliu notes, the poet most of all feared living in an unheated room; this theme permeates his verse, wherein the chimney flame "celebrated as if a loved and longed-for human being". His works were generally inspired by Eminescu and George Coșbuc, but, as communist poet Dan Deșliu writes, they also had distinct echoes from left-liberal and socialist poets—Cezar Bolliac, Dimitrie Bolintineanu, Traian Demetrescu, and Alexandru Vlahuță. As noted in the 2004 biographical dictionary of Romanian writers, they reach at least the average quality of contemporary verses, and along with discussing then-current themes (suffering brought about by love, melancholy, vibrations before nature), they bring new elements such as comradeship with those who suffer and an urging toward revolution and belief in the future. His more contemplative poems describe the conflict between the quiet beauty of rural landscapes and the inner turmoil of proletarians who witness them.

Neculuță was impressed with the plight of all lower strata, producing some poems specifically about the sufferings of peasants or the Romani underclass. However, he remains primarily important for his ability to convey industrial strife. While acknowledging the "gaucherie" of various such compositions, Deșliu highlights their overall primordialism in a Marxist setting: "Before Neculuță's time—and even for a long time after him—the most gifted poets of social rebellion worked with vague terms, with generalized and imprecise notions: people, justice, liberty, truth etc. The grounded, class-based position, only makes its first appearance in verse by D. Th. Neculuță". Hungarian Romanian poet Jenő Kiss, who translated some of Neculuță's poems, highlights the same notion: "the great majority of Romanian progressive poets had generally talked about the sufferings of 'the people', but by the people they mainly meant the poor peasantry. Others often said proletariat, but meant Lumpenproletariat. In Neculuță's poems, the voices of class-conscious urban and industrial workers are unmistakably heard. [...] [He] condenses the tragedy of proletarians selling their labor power into the mood of those waiting for a job opportunity in front of the factory. Despite this, there is no trace of romantic anti-capitalism in his poetry. The factory and the machine are not enemies of Neculuță and his colleagues. Work and the workplace are 'sacred', the machine is a diligent friend." Kiss further describes Neculuță as stylistically accomplished: "the most difficult and demanding verse forms, primarily the sonnet, but also other, complicated stanza formulas, right up to the tune of folk songs. With verse forms that required [my] full mastery of the language, selective and abundant rhyme here and there, flawless rhythm, brevity, thoughtfulness."

=== Later life ===
Moving to Bucharest, the national capital, "toward the turn of the century", Neculuță joined the newly formed Social Democratic Workers' Party of Romania (PSDMR), becoming its "poet-activist". Journalist Leontin Iliescu, who met him upon his arrival, recalls that Neculuță only had 4 lei on him, all of which he spent on a ticket to see Jan Kubelík play; that night, he bunked with a friend, the sculptor Filip Marin. He tried again to change profession by applying for the Music Conservatory. According to Kiss, he was simply rejected; Spina, however, notes that he was "for a short while, a Conservatory student." After this failure, he "lived the life of a poor shoemaker in Bucharest, working ten to fourteen hours a day in the shop. Neculuță's most precious hours are spent in this aimless prison-like work. with no perspectives." Such conditions undermined his family life: he was married to a Bucharest woman, but divorced her after six years, thereafter dedicating himself entirely to political work, "one of the most educated and consistent fighters of the Romanian proletariat."

The socialist movement's historiographer, Constantin Titel Petrescu, places Neculuță at Bucharest's Sotir Hall, the socialist club, in or shortly after 1895—noting that he was one of two "poet-cobblers" that the PSDMR could count as its own—the other one was Arghir Parua. Dragomir identifies him as D. Azur, the author of an 1895 piece taken up by the illustrated supplement of Adevărul daily. During the antisemitic agitation of November 1897, Neculuță took the side of Romanian Jewish victims. His La un vandalism antisemit ("Regarding an Act of Antisemitic Vandalism") appeared in a single-issue socialist paper, known either as Vă Înfrățiți, Noroade! ("Come Together as One, Peoples!") or Jos Vandalii! ("Down with the Vandals!"). According to Iliescu, his poetry in favor of world fraternity was not unlike works by Sully Prudhomme—though, he adds, Neculuță could not have been acquainted with Prudhomme's verse.

Overall, Neculuță remained loyal to the Marxist faction led by I. C. Frimu following an 1899 split in the movement—a "revolutionary appeal" he published that year, called Spre țărmul dreptății ("Toward the Shores of Justice"), implicitly condemned PSDMR centrists (known as the "generous ones"). By 1901, he and fellow shoemaker Valerian Prescurea were among the most active members of Munca society, which, from its offices on Bucharest's Vamei Street, supported the PSDMR's reestablishment, recruiting intellectuals such as C. Z. Buzdugan and Iosif Nădejde. In Icoana Vremii, Neculuță also published two prose pieces which later critics describe as being without particular artistic value, as well as several articles that put forth his credo of a politically engaged poet. His work also appeared in Lumea Nouă, România Muncitoare, and Viitorul Social. One of Neculuță's final assignments, from 1902, was as co-chair of the România Muncitoare club, alongside Constantinescu and Frimu. Around that time, he also taught the adolescent Gheorghe Ene Filipescu to read; Filipescu would later advance politically as a high-ranking member of the Social Democratic Party.

In or around 1904, Neculuță hosted in Bucharest George Bacovia, the younger socialist poet, with whom he attended the May Day celebrations at Dacia Hall. Critic Cornel Regman proposes that there was a crossover of themes and stylistic choices between the two writers—though Neculuță remained Eminescu-like, and Bacovia took up Symbolism. He believes that Neculuță "foreran Bacovia with a number of intuitions, however incomplete these might have been." Shared elements include a "grave internal melody", the "unmitigated pain of experience", and "crude", quasi-Imagist, depictions of ravens and crows, or insistence on the metaphoric qualities of metals such as lead (for both poets) and zinc (favored by Neculuță). Despite this sharing themes in the authors' non-political poems, Regman finds it unlikely that Bacovia's militant verse was ever directly influenced by Neculuță. This is largely because Bacovia "assimilates through transfiguration."

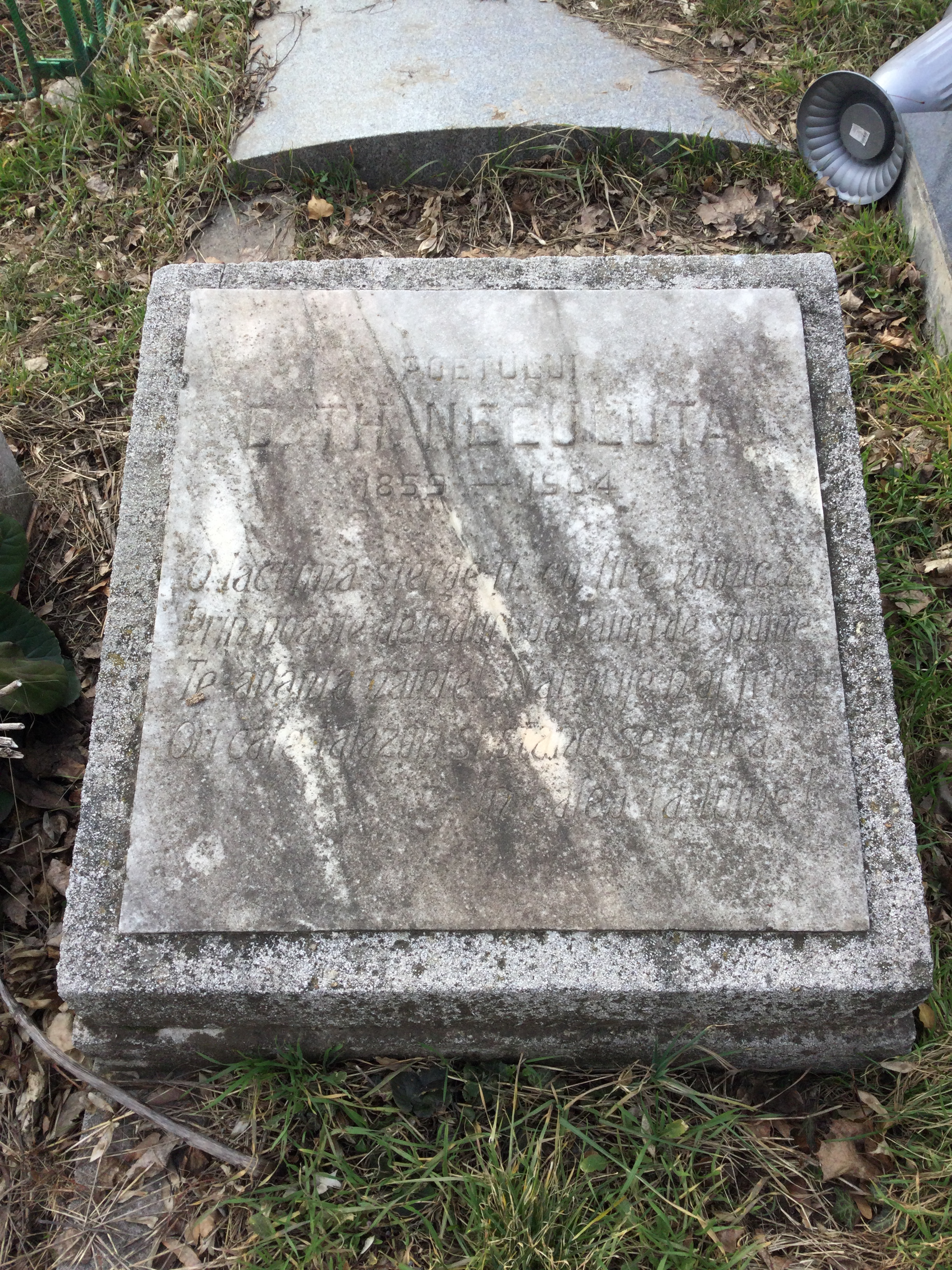
Grave at Bellu Cemetery

"Impoverished and lamented by the proletariat as a whole", the poet died at his one-room home on Bucharest's Ștefan cel Mare Highway shortly after his 46th birthday (on October 17, 1904, in New Style dates). Though writer Constantin Țoiu recalled in 1997 that Neculuță had died of lung disease in Colentina Hospital, he had in fact suffered a fatal heart attack. According to Kiss, his cardiac condition was owed to physical exhaustion from "continuous strenuous work". An inventory carried out on the day of Neculuță's death records that he only owned an iron bed and mattress, a table, a coat hanger, a coffer filled with books, one shirt, plates, and some other items. His definitive manuscript, which he kept under the mattress, went unreported. The funeral cortege, comprising workers, was initially scheduled to walk down Calea Victoriei, and thus parade in front of the Royal Mansion. Romanian Police intervened to stop this from occurring, and also confiscated red flags carried by participants. Two hundred black ribbons were distributed instead. This count was reported to Frimu, who openly rejoiced: "Well then, that there's two hundred friends of our cause! So then, we're growing, we're getting stronger! The future is ours!" Neculuță was buried in Bellu Cemetery, originally in a crypt designed by Filip Marin. Marin was later buried in that same spot, alongside his friend.

== Posterity ==
=== Early commemorations ===
Neculuță's only book appeared posthumously in 1907 as Spre țărmul dreptății; reportedly, its editor was Constantinescu. It was still in print shortly after the peasants' revolt of 1907. According to a Gendarmerie report, during the subsequent clampdown socialists made efforts to reach out to peasants with their propaganda. In March 1908, a Gorj County activist was held in custody for distributing Neculuță's poems, alongside pamphlets by Christian Rakovsky, Toma Dragu, and Peter Kropotkin. Neculuță's volume was also circulated in Austria-Hungary by the Social Democratic Party of Hungary and its Romanian section, which recommended it as "not [to be] left out of any enlightened worker's personal library". In October 1911, Arad's socialist club commemorated Neculuță with public readings from his work. The meeting was attended by poet Sándor Csizmadia, who expressed his belief in proletarian internationalism as a cultural bridge between Romanians and Hungarians. A reprint of Spre țărmul, curated by Barbu Lăzăreanu, appeared in 1919.

According to Petrescu, Neculuță's other contribution was in rekindling socialist agitation after the "generous ones" had split the movement. Overall, he notes, "Neculuță failed to achieve his definitive accomplishment as a poet, since the hurdles of his existence never gave him time to follow the path of an artist." The young writer-typographer Ion Pas, who was inducted by the socialist movement "just seven years after Neculuță's death", recalled that Vasile Anagnoste, who had "worked with him in the same shop", instructed younger workers to "maintain his cult." In 1925, the communist novelist Panait Istrati, who had achieved international fame, paid homage to Neculuță as a precursor:

the Romanian labor movement has had its poet, a man called Neculuță, the soul of a man who should have lived with other horizons, and in another time, in order to express all of what he felt. [...] Neculuță lived in some shack, unknown to all, yet, had they brought him Paris on a platter, he would not have been surprised: he'd have accepted it as his rightful belonging!

In a 1926 piece on the standards of Romanian "proletarian literature", Ion Mehedințeanu argued that "bourgeois criticism" had both Neculuță and his younger colleague, Ion Păun-Pincio, "buried in the tomb of silence". As he notes: "Shoemaker Neculuță's poetry volume is the shrieking anguish of a prostrating and obscured class. His eyes set on the shores of justice, he awakens the proletariat to the coming age." Deșliu similarly claims that "bourgeois criticism and historiography [...] weaved around Neculuță's work that familiar conspiracy of silence", leaving socialist gatherings as the only venue which still cultivated his verse. He argues that this underground fame helped to establish a style of radical poetry, including anonymous interwar hymns by Communist-Party militants. Some other works of this nature had known authors: as one of the Communist Party founders, Mihail Cruceanu wrote "poetry in the manner of lyrical cobbler Theodor Neculuță". Paul Niculescu-Mizil, later a Party eminence, recalled that in his 1930s childhood he "loved Neculuță, a socialist poet", which contributed to his political choices.

On the 20th commemoration of Neculuță's death on October 7, 1924, a "great number of workers and intellectuals" visited the socialist club on Brezoianu Street to pay homage; police agents reportedly encircled the hall, and only allowed attendees to leave at midnight. Spina noted that "a few workers, who have gathered to commemorate the death of their only bard, were dispersed as if a conspiratorial terrorist assembly." Democracy activist Dem. I. Dobrescu regarded the event as a pseudo-legal ban on "legal socialism", at a time when Neculuță's poems "are printed and are allowed to be printed." The 24th commemoration in 1928 was marked by a workers' pilgrimage at Bellu, though reportedly no writers were invited. A similar event in 1930 was hosted by the Socialist Workers Party of Romania, with Anagnoste conferencing "on the poet's life and work." Between these two events, in December 1929, the Romanian Railways workers' club in Pașcani was established, and took its name from Neculuță.

In November 1933, the United Workers' Syndicates in Craiova featured a Neculuță recital; as reported by labor organizer Eugen Constant, only the senior actor Al. Demetrescu-Dan could muster the courage of presenting socialist poetry in such unmitigated circumstances. Later that decade, the poet was gaining recognition from the authorities themselves. In November 1935, they allowed communists held in Jilava Prison to mark October Revolution Day with a small festivity, which included recitations from Neculuță's poems. Inside the Soviet Union, which had set up a Moldavian autonomous republic on Romania's border, dissident Romanian literature was sometimes vetted and encouraged. As part of this process, Soviet editions of Neculuță and Alexandru Vlahuță's poems could appear, at Tiraspol, in 1932.

At home, Neculuță was also afforded attention by the National Renaissance Front regime of 1938–1940, which reclaimed him for its brand of corporate statism. Its official magazine, Muncă și Voe Bună, reported that this "poet-cobbler" had lived during an era of slavery, and praised him for his take on the social landscape of ca. 1900. Under the regime of Ion Antonescu, critics discovered the patriotic poetry of another proletarian, Leonte Dumitrescu, whom they likened to Neculuță. In that context, Iliescu argued that Neculuță had been "quickly and unjustly forgotten." Also a shoemaker and poet, Cristian Sârbu braved Antonescu's censors by titling one of his volumes as D. Th. Neculuță. Shortly after the coup of August 1944, the General Confederation of Labor issued a volume of "labor poetry", which included Neculuță's Cor de robi ("A Slaves' Choir"). It earned attention from poet Camil Baltazar, who called the piece "vigorous" and "predictive".

=== Official status and downgrading ===
In October 1948, when it revamped the Romanian Academy, the new communist regime selected Neculuță as a post-mortem member. The proposal was submitted on behalf of the academicians by novelist Mihail Sadoveanu. Also that year, a street in Vatra Luminoasă, a workers' section of Bucharest, was renamed after Neculuță, having earlier been named for Ioan S. Nenițescu. By 1949, the Bucharest People's Council had mandated Al. Gheorghiu Pogonești, a children's writer, with running a Neculuță Literary Circle. Regulars included Gheorghe Achiței, Alexandru Andrițoiu, and Fănuș Neagu. The brewery of Iași was also named after the poet. These gestures inaugurated what the Communist Party newspaper, Scînteia, described as a "work to restore the cultural treasure of the past", which included "bringing out to light the work of our first worker-poet". A monograph on Neculuță, written "in the spirit of the times", was completed and published in 1950 by Ion Vitner, a dentist turned literary critic. In it, Vitner proposed that Neculuță had outranked Eminescu when it came to poetic abilities in depicting the "bitter fate of an individual within the bourgeois and landowning society." Also according to Vitner, the value of Neculuță's work rested in his using traditionalist themes from Eminescu, Coșbuc, and Vlahuță, crafting them into a "weapon of war against the inimical ideology of the bourgeoisie".

The arrest and prosecution of poet Ion Negoițescu entailed an analysis of his contribution, with one Securitate officer proposing that Negoițescu's 1947 anthology of Romanian poetry was a corpus delicti—among the reasons cited was its failure to sample Neculuță's work. In the early 1950s, samples of Neculuță's poetry were included in the Romanian high-school curriculum, initially as "provisional theses". The 50-year commemoration of Neculuță's death was marked by the Writers' Union of Romania with an official ceremony: Dragomir gave a lecture, while Demostene Botez and Ioanichie Olteanu read out from Spre țărmul. The following year, critic George Ivașcu wrote about Neculuță's inclusion in the high school curriculum as an "act of justice toward a writer of working-class origin and—precisely for that reason—chased out of all bourgeois schoolbooks." At that moment in Romanian history, which came with the embrace of socialist realism, official publishing houses put out editions of his works, some of which ran at 100,000 copies. In 1955, Kiss rendered Spre țărmul in Hungarian; the same year, Endre Pálffy published a bio-bibliographic study of Neculuță in Filológiai Közlöny, specifically aimed at readers in the Hungarian People's Republic. Sample translations from Neculuță were included in Romanian poetry anthologies such as Mario de Micheli's Antologia della poesia romena (1961) and Alain Bosquet's Anthologie de la poésie roumaine (1968).

The Eminescu–Neculuță comparison, which downgraded the former, came to be seen as controversial, including in Marxist circles. It was criticized as early as April 1958 by a Marxist literary man, Ovid Crohmălniceanu, who opined that only "vulgar sociologism" could account for such views. For a while, the poet was still honored, mainly as a hero of the working class, with sculptor Anghel Chiciu completing his bust in 1960. Neculuță's cultivation was fully curbed in the mid-1960s, with the advent of national communism. As noted by critic Tudor Opriș, it saw the "reduction to their normal dimensions of writers whom Proletkult apologetics had hypertrophied"—Neculuță and Vlahuță, but also Bolliac and Alexandru Toma. Reportedly, the last piece to include Neculuță within the "commandeered and colonized canon" was put out by Emil Boldan in 1961. In his comparative study of Neculuță and Bacovia, put out in 1963, Regman defended Neculuță's status as a poet, arguing that his work had genuine aesthetic value beyond Vitner's "simplified" take.

Țoiu believes that Neculuță's posthumous downfall mainly happened because the new communist leader, Nicolae Ceaușescu, loathed poems which reminded him of his own shoemaker's training. In 1984, literary scholar Al. Dobrescu argued that poets such as Neculuță and Panait Cerna only had "informative value", and that students could be excused for not memorizing their works, whereas "it is mandatory that they be trained to read any poem by Eminescu". Also that year, critic Serafim Duicu praised socialist doyen Constantin Dobrogeanu-Gherea for not having endorsed "modest" Neculuță's elevation to the literary canon. During the later stages of Romanian communism, several authors thanked the regime for having restored balance in assessing Romanian literature—specifically referring to Neculuță as a bad model. This was the case with Elena Tacciu, who spoke about Neculuță as having been propped up by a "tyranny of dogmatic schemas", and with Ion Cristoiu, who noted that writers were better if inspired by a "great tradition", and not by Neculuță. He was still honored in Scînteia as one of the earliest Romanian authors to have embraced the social, "with their still-modest means". In November 1989, journalist H. Lerea noted that "the first artisan-poet [was] an innocent victim of overbidding during the dogmatic period".

Following the anti-communist rebellion of December, Neculuță and other socialist writers underwent further reassessment, with literary historian Matei Călinescu calling the previous trend "aberrant": "in poetry, for instance, alongside Eminescu, and at some point even above him, they worked to establish the reputation of the 'cobbler-poet' D. Th. Neculuță as a proletarian classic". In November 1990, Brașov's Poet Neculuță Alley was renamed after Stephan Ludwig Roth. Revisiting Neculuță's poetry after hearing it recited by his barber, Țoiu commented that he was primarily a "decent shoemaker" and "unfortunate people's bard", who never warranted "the sort of revulsion, of aversion, that I felt toward the dictator." In early 2008, the poet's name resurfaced in a satirical computer quiz game mocking Prime Minister Adrian Năstase for his supposed Romani origin. Users were asked to pick from several public figures, of whom Neculuță, rather than Năstase, was the only Romanian.
