= Constantin Mille =

Romanian journalist, novelist, poet, lawyer, and socialist militant (1861–1927)

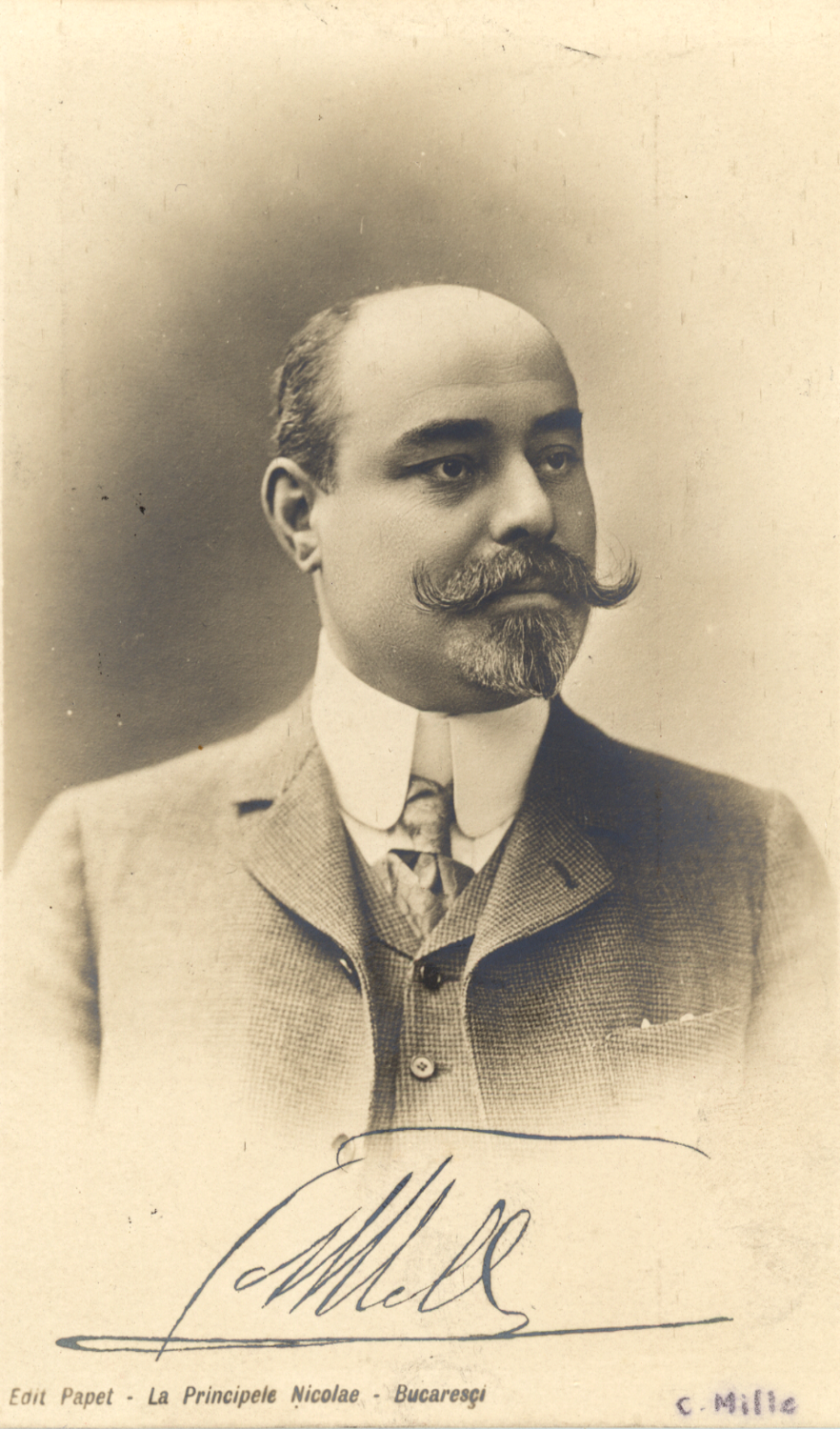
- Constantin Mille

Member of the Chamber of Deputies of Romania
- In office 1899–1903
- Constituency: Teleorman County
- In office 1907–1911
- Constituency: Teleorman County

Personal details
- Born: December 21, 1861 Iași, United Principalities of Moldavia and Wallachia
- Died: February 20, 1927 (aged 65)
- Party: independent
- Occupation: journalist, lawyer, novelist, poet

Constantin Mille (Romanian pronunciation: [konstanˈtin ˈmile]; December 21, 1861 – February 20, 1927) was a Romanian journalist, novelist, poet, lawyer, and socialist militant, as well as a prominent human rights activist. A Marxist for much of his life, Mille was noted for his vocal support of peasant emancipation, for his early involvement with the Romanian Social Democratic Workers' Party (PSDMR), and his presence at the head of several magazines, culminating in his association with the moderate left-wing newspapers Adevărul and Dimineața. After serving as an independent member of the Chamber of Deputies for one mandate (1899–1903), he aligned his views with those of Take Ionescu, and became a supporter of Romania's entry into World War I alongside the Entente Powers. In addition to his political career, Mille was the author of two autobiographical novels (Dinu Millian, 1884, and O viață, 1914).

== Biography ==
=== Early life and literature ===
Born in Iași, he later indicated, in his Dinu Millian (written on the model set by Jules Vallès), that his childhood had been a tragic one, with his father suffering from a mental disorder and his mother falling severely ill. Also according to his testimony, Mille spent much of his childhood and early youth in a boarding school.

He attended the local university's Faculty of Law in autumn 1878, and became associated with other socialists, including the Russian-born Nicolae Russel, a physician and noted militant, as well as the locals Alexandru Bădărău, and the brothers Ioan and Gheorghe Nădejde. Mille also began his association with the Iași-based socialist magazine Contemporanul, which carried a polemic with the established literary society Junimea, and authored his first poems, collected in a "red notebook". Among his debut works was an 1882 poem honoring Vasile Conta, the materialist philosopher who had died in the same year.

Allegedly winning Eminescu's admiration, his literary attempts were nonetheless later dismissed as "pure prose" by the influential writer and critic George Călinescu. A similar view was expressed by Traian Demetrescu (also known as Tradem), an eclectic poet who shared views with the Symbolists, and who contended that Mille lacked "a powerful talent, the original disposition of an artist", which had prevented him from "creating, out of [his] socialistic material, remarkable works". Tradem concluded that "[w]ithout profound meditation, without sensitivity, without imagination, an artist cannot become anything other than, at most, a fecund and passable worker, and not an illustrious figure that would endure". Most of Constantin Mille's prose works bear the imprint of Naturalism.

With Russel and others, he organized the first General Congress of Romanian Students (1880), and ultimately attracted attention from the authorities, who, later in the same year, transported Russel out of the country as an agitator.

=== Studies abroad ===
Ultimately expelled from the faculty due to his politics, Mille left for France, where he attended the University of Paris (spring of 1882). He became one of the main figures in the Romanian students' left-wing circle of Paris — together with, among others, Alexandru Radovici, the future minister Mihai Săulescu, as well as Vintilă and Horia Rosetti (the sons of Radical leader C. A. Rosetti).

Mille and Săulescu hatched up an intricate practical joke, designed to ridicule the Conservative Party and its press organ, Timpul: from early in 1882 and until September, using the name Gh[eorghe] Copăcineanu, they sent letters to the editors, which presented imaginary, shock-value, accounts of student activities in the French capital, part of which specifically referred to Mille himself (among other things, they pretended that Mille had become a restaurateur, and that Copăcineanu had been assailed by socialists armed with knives while crossing the Seine on the Austerlitz Bridge). The correspondence was published in its entirety by the Romanian newspaper, which led Mille to declare that "any inanity can fit in the journal's columns". Ultimately, Mille revealed that he was responsible for the whole affair (a notice published by Telegraful); although Timpul did not reply, Mihai Eminescu, the influential poet who worked in the journal's mail room and reviewed all letters, later confessed to Zamfir Arbore that he had "given approval for print without reading them".

Mille completed his studies in Brussels, at the Université Libre, being awarded a diploma in Law (1884). He returned to Romania during the same year, and settled in Bucharest, joining the local Bar association.

=== Bucharest socialist circle ===
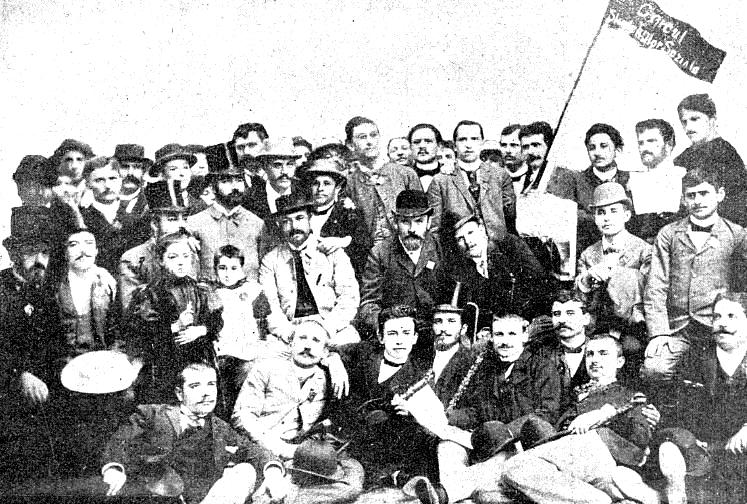
The Bucharest socialist circle in 1892. Mille, holding his two daughters in his lap, is third seated from the left in the second row; next in line, seated: Vasile Morțun and Constantin Dobrogeanu-Gherea. Artur Stavri is first seated from the left in the same row. Top row, standing, from the right: Ion Păun-Pincio (third), Henri Sanielevici (fourth), Simion Sanielevici (eighth).

Although initially an advocate of common-law marriage, Mille allegedly accepted a Romanian Orthodox ceremony, and, according to Călinescu, "defended [his new position] through ridiculous sophistry". A founding member of the socialist circle in Bucharest (known as Cercul de Studii Sociale, the Social Studies Circle), he joined Ioan Nădejde in creating the magazine Drepturile Omului (published for several months in 1885 and reestablished in 1888, it ceased to exist in 1889).

The editors repeatedly issues calls for the creation of a working class party, and argued in favor of public ownership, but also took inspiration from Narodnik ideas (see Poporanism). According to Henri H. Stahl, during the late 1880s and early 1890s, Mille shared the vision of Vasile Morțun, Alexandru G. Radovici and Nădejde, which called on the socialist clubs to merge with progressive and radical forces such as George Panu's grouping. Nicknamed the generoși ("generous ones"), and arguing that Romanian socialism could only be established when capitalism had been fully developed, they thus disagreed with the mainstream Marxist theorist Constantin Dobrogeanu-Gherea. Most of these younger socialists associated with the socialist sympathizer Constantin Stere, and, a decade later, merged with the National Liberal Party (PNL).

With Panait Mușoiu and Nădejde, Mille founded the magazine Munca, which was published between 1890 and 1894. It followed in the wake of Contemporanul's 1891 disestablishment, and adhered to Dobrogeanu-Gherea's pamphlet Ce vor socialiștii români? ("What Do the Romanian Socialists Want?", 1886), which had set the tone for unifying the various socialist groups in the country. Carrying the subtitle "Organ social democrat" ("Social democratic organ"), Munca effectively relocated the center of socialist activity from Iași to Bucharest, and had among its collaborators Garabet Ibrăileanu, Sofia Nădejde, and Mihai Pastia. Associated with the labor movement and frequently reporting on strikes, the newspaper urged workers to organize into trade unions and popularized Marxist tenets. In 1891, Nădejde, Mille and Morțun issued a manifesto of the would-be socialist party (at the time, a loose rally of socialist clubs), entitled Manifest către țărani, în numele Comitetului electoral al partidului ("Manifesto to the Peasants, in the Name of the Party's Election Committee").

=== PSDMR episode and deputy ===
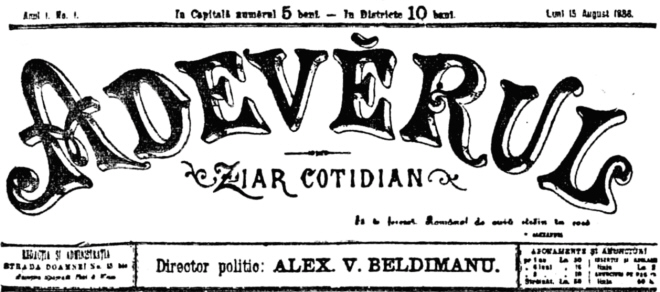
Adevĕrul logo in 1888

In 1893, Mille joined the newly created PSDMR and stood among its most radical members, calling for immediate social reform. He was to be expelled from the group two years later, due to his purchase of Adevărul (known then as Adevĕrul), which was considered bourgeois in tone. During the same period, Adevărul became involved in a heated debate with the literary magazine Vieața, after publishing an article in irreverent tone which referred to the writer and editor Alexandru Vlahuță as "a scoundrel". From that moment on, Vieața repeatedly issued unflattering reviews of works by socialist authors, and chronicled Mille's poetry under the derisive title "Pliviri" ("Weedings").

Taking over as editor-in-chief following Alexandru Beldiman's death in 1898, he led the paper into opposition to the PNL cabinet of Dimitrie Sturdza, who he argued had betrayed the generoși in his party by endorsing reactionary policies. During the elections of 1899, the newspaper, through its correspondent Ioan Bacalbașa, investigated alleged violence by government forces in Slatina. At the time, Mille was proposed as an independent candidate for Teleorman County, running for the Third Electoral College (that of peasants), and came to serve a mandate in the Chamber of Deputies. He was again elected during the 1907 suffrage.

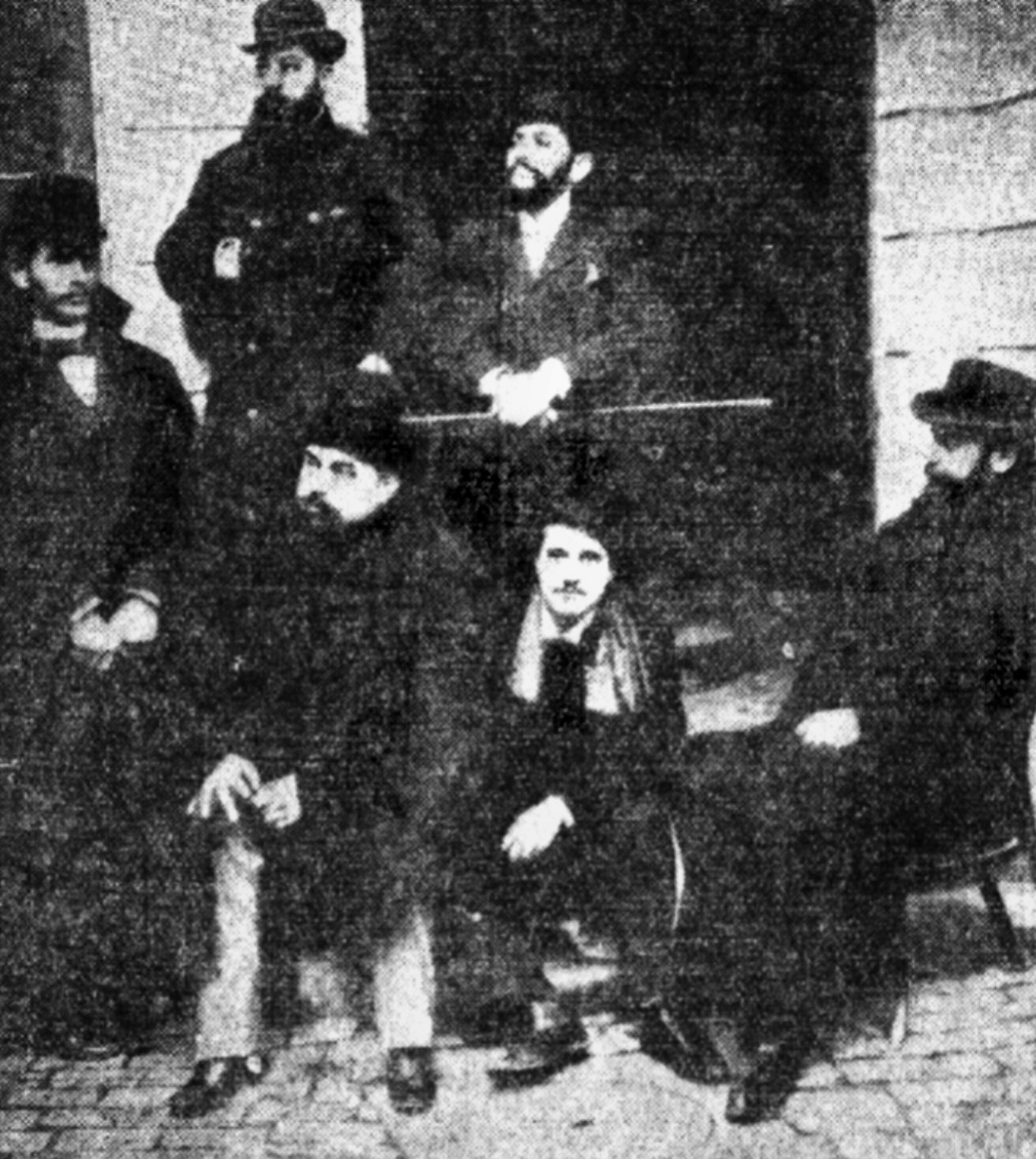
The editorial staff of Adevărul in 1897: Mille is first seated from the left, with Ioan Bacalbașa standing behind him

In December, following the arrival to power of Gheorghe Cantacuzino and the Conservative Party, Adevărul investigated and denounced the practices of a French firm who had failed to respect its obligations involving public works in Constanța (see Hallier Affair). Their campaign culminated in the intervention of low-ranking police forces, who assaulted Mille and Bacalbașa — while recovering, they were visited by the PNL's Ion I. C. Brătianu, who expressed his sympathy.

Also in 1899, the PSDMR disbanded, when a scandal was caused by the presence of socialist clubs in the countryside — of them, the PNL's Minister of the Interior Mihail Pherekyde claimed had been fermenting agitation, an accusation which met with protests from Mille and his Adevărul. In parallel, Munca's legacy was taken over in 1902 by Christian Rakovsky's România Muncitoare, which was more radical in tone and hosted contributions by Mille. As deputy, he unsuccessfully promoted universal suffrage, and notably called for the reduction of tariffs on products of strict necessity to peasants.

=== Early 1900s causes ===
Interested in international causes, Mille was, by 1903, a vocal supporter of Alfred Dreyfus and Émile Zola during the Dreyfus Affair which split France into two rival political camps, one in arguing in favor of nationalism and militarism and the other in favor of justice and human rights. Writing at the time, he identified the Third Republic's influential conservative, revanchist and antisemitic groups with a "militarist dictatorship".

In following years, Constantin Mille and Adevărul became opponents of the foreign policy endorsed by the new Sturdza cabinet, and denounced the convention signed with Austria-Hungary regarding, among other things, the duty to extradite Austrian citizens who took refuge to Romania — Mille argued that this was disadvantageous to ethnic Romanian political activists in Transylvania, Bukovina, and the Banat. He took the same stand on similar issues involving relations with the Russian and Ottoman Empires, calling for Bessarabians, Albanians and Aromanians who had evaded to Romania not to be persecuted. Additionally, in 1905, as the mutinous battleship Potemkin took refuge in Constanța, he and his newspapers asked the Cantacuzino government to offer sailors safe haven.

He issued his second daily in 1904: begun as a morning edition of Adevărul, Dimineața soon became a paper on its own, and, through it, Mille was responsible for bringing in several innovations in the local press. He introduced colored print and images, leading Dimineața to claim that it was the first daily to be published in color (1912), and was the first in his country to make use of Linotype machines (1907).

During the large-scale Peasants' Revolt of 1907, he voiced criticism of the governing PNL for the violent manner in which it opted to repress protests, and questioned the attitudes of former socialists who had joined the latter group (including Constantin Stere, who was serving as prefect). At the time, Mille wrote:

"Pacification, not cruelty! We do not wish to start a campaign on this painful issue. We hope that we will be heard and not have to alert public opinion, because calm is required in these murky and unfortunate times. Yet we cannot allow that, after the savagery of peasant gangs, follow the savagery of people coming «with the law»."

Additionally, Mille's paper called for reparations to be paid to victims' families, for an amnesty to be declared, and for Vasile Kogălniceanu, an activist who supported the peasant cause and faced trial, to be set free; it also published the influential protest of Ion Luca Caragiale (1907 din primăvară până'n toamnă, "1907 from Spring till Autumn"), which questioned the establishment and policies of Romania.

Immediately after the Revolt, Adevărul was among the sources to make the controversial claim that 11,000 peasants had perished in the events. According to historian Anton Caragea, a confidential report of that year, presented to his superiors by the Austro-Hungarian Imperial and Royal Secret Service agent Günther, informed that Mille, as well as the editors of Universul and Epoca, had been advanced sums of money in order to exaggerate the amplitude of repression, and to incite both local and international outrage. The importance and extent of Austro-Hungarian agitation remains a debated subject: it has also been argued that, in concrete terms, foreign influence proved to be insignificant.

=== 1908-1914 politics ===
After 1908, Mille sided with the Take Ionescu-led politicians who split from the Conservative Party to form the Conservative-Democratic grouping. Like Ionescu, he supported measures for the union of Transylvania, Banat, and Bukovina with the Kingdom of Romania, and visited the region to attend meetings of the Romanian National Party, but, in 1908, came into conflict with its prominent activist Iuliu Maniu — while Mille insisted that Romanians in Transylvania and the Banat were to seek collaboration with left-wing forces in Romania, Maniu presented a purely nationalist perspective, indicated that he expected support from the entire Romanian community. According to Sever Bocu, who witnessed the debate, Mille considered Maniu's position "reactionary". Adevărul notably condemned the disadvantageous trade convention signed between Romania and Austria-Hungary, signaled that Romanians in the region were being subjected to violence, and alleged that the Austro-Hungarian state had included within its borders ridges of the Carpathians that it had no right to own.

When an attempt on the life of PNL Premier Ion I. C. Brătianu, carried out by a certain Stoenescu, occurred in December 1909, authorities took the measure of arresting România Muncitoare editors, who were believed to be instigators of the attack. In reaction to this, Constantin Mille accused the generoși of having left room for confusion inside the socialist camp by way of their departure to the PNL, and speculated that, through their tacit acceptance of PNL politics, they had provoked a rise in the popularity of "Anarchism". A wider polemic ensued when the socialist-turned-Liberal Garabet Ibrăileanu replied in Viitorul, defending those principles advocated by the generoși in front of both Mille and Dobrogeanu-Gherea.

In 1911, Mille wrote several articles defending Alexandru Nicolau, an activist of the newly created Social Democratic Party who was facing trial for his vocal criticism of the Romanian Army (Nicolau was eventually acquitted).

=== World War I ===
At a time when the socialist movement grouped itself around the Zimmerwald Movement and called for Romania to stay out of the World War, Mille became instead a vocal supporter of joining the Entente Powers, insisting that Romania should assist France and take over Transylvania. In a 1915 letter to Leon Trotsky, the influential socialist and Zimmerwald partisan Christian Rakovsky accused Mille of having been corrupted by Take Ionescu, and of using his newspapers for propaganda "under the mask of independence". He also claimed: "[Ionescu] thus compensated for the weakness of his party, both in men and ideas, through corrupting the press".

As the Romanian Campaign witnessed the occupation of Bucharest by the Central Powers, Mille and several of his collaborators took refuge in Iași, while other Adevărul journalists were arrested by German forces and deported to Bulgaria. He returned after the Treaty of Bucharest.

When the strike of compositors in Bucharest (December 13, 1918), organized by the Socialist Party of Romania, was repressed in violence by the authorities — who saw in it signs of Bolshevik agitation) —, Mille joined Constantin Titel Petrescu, Radu R. Rosetti, N. D. Cocea, and Toma Dragu on the defense team of arrested Socialists (of them, only communist sympathizers such as Alecu Constantinescu were found guilty, all sentenced to 5 years in prison).

=== Final years ===
After the war, Mille began editing the magazine Lupta. Again present in Transylvania in 1921, he notably met and conversed with Hungarian historian and sociologist Oszkár Jászi. In 1923, he helped create Liga Drepturilor Omului (the League for Human Rights), reuniting a left-leaning activists such as Titel Petrescu, Rosetti, Constantin Rădulescu-Motru, Virgil Madgearu, Constantin Costa-Foru, Nicolae L. Lupu, Dem I. Dobrescu, Victor Eftimiu, and Grigore Iunian; it was active until 1928.

He gradually ceased his work at Adevărul and, shortly before his death, handed the paper over to a consortium headed by Aristide Blank. In January 1926, during the final stage of a scandal involving Prince Carol's wartime morganatic marriage to Zizi Lambrino, he came to the attention of the secret police, Siguranţa Statului, for supporting her claim that the marriage was illegally annulled by the Supreme Court, and for offering her assistance at a time when she visited Bucharest (according to Siguranța Statului, the two were related).
