= Ottoi Călin =

Romanian physician, journalist and socialist militant (1886–1917)

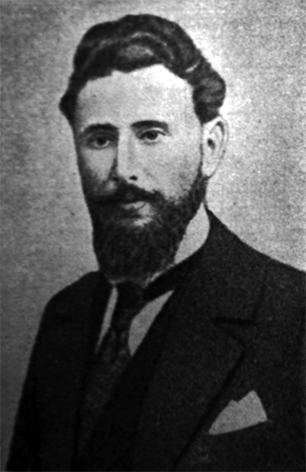
- Born: March , 1886; Iași, Kingdom of Romania
- Died: April 1, 1917 (aged 31); Iași
- Occupation: physician

Ottoi Călin (March 1886 – 1 April 1917) was a Romanian physician, journalist and socialist militant, considered one of the theoreticians of the Romanian workers' movement during the early 20th century.

== Early life and education ==
Călin was born in a poor Jewish family in Iași, in north-eastern Romania. After finishing high school, he obtained a medical degree from the local university. During his teen years, along with other young students, he frequented the Circle of Social Studies organized by socialists Leon Ghelerter and Max Vexler. The Circle, the main left-wing association in Moldavia at the time, played a major role in shaping future leaders of the Romanian socialist movement, such as Mihail Gheorghiu Bujor and Ilie Moscovici. Beside participating in the Circle, Călin lectured on natural and social sciences for a local adult school. Beginning with 1908, he published regularly in the Viitorul Social magazine, with his articles targeting primarily theoretical and tactical issues. Among his noted contributions of the time are a brief biography on Karl Marx, providing an analysis of the latter's contributions to the development of scientific socialism, and a history of the Paris Commune, presented as a proof of the viability of proletarian rule. During the same period, Călin also worked towards the establishment of a socialist youth organization. In 1910 he was one of the representatives of the Iaşi socialists at the Congress that formalised the creation of the Social Democratic Party (PSD).

After graduating in 1911, with the support of fellow party-members, Călin left for Western Europe in order to further his medical studies. Following a brief stay in Berlin, he arrived in Paris, where he joined the existing Romanian socialist group comprising, among others, Christian Rakovsky, Ioan Sion and Barbu Lăzăreanu. Călin used the occasion to forge relations with the local socialist party. Continuing his theoretical pursuits, he was particularly influenced by the ideas of Jean Jaurès, embracing pacifism.

== Activism and war ==
Returning to Romania, Călin settled in Bucharest and practised medicine, specializing as an internist. At the same time he continued his journalistic activity, writing for Viitorul Social and România Muncitoare, and lectured on the history of socialist doctrines for the Socialist School set up by the party in Romania's capital. Along with many of the leading party members, Călin was one of the founding members of Casa Poporului, a cooperative society established in October 1914 in order to manage the various party headquarters across Romania. As a recognition for his efforts, in 1913, the Executive Committee of the PSD designated him as the editor in chief of the second series of Viitorul Social, position he would hold until 1915. The main responsible with the magazine's columns on the international socialist movement, he also continued to contribute articles on major theoretical themes, such as parliamentarism, the universal vote, and the socialist attitude towards the war . Around this time, he also held, under the pseudonym Ioan Otescu, the weekly medical column in Seara, and published research articles in Higiena, concentrating on illnesses prevalent among the poor. Furthermore, Călin translated Gorky's The Mother and, along with Bujor, Karl Kautsky's commentary on the Erfurt Program.

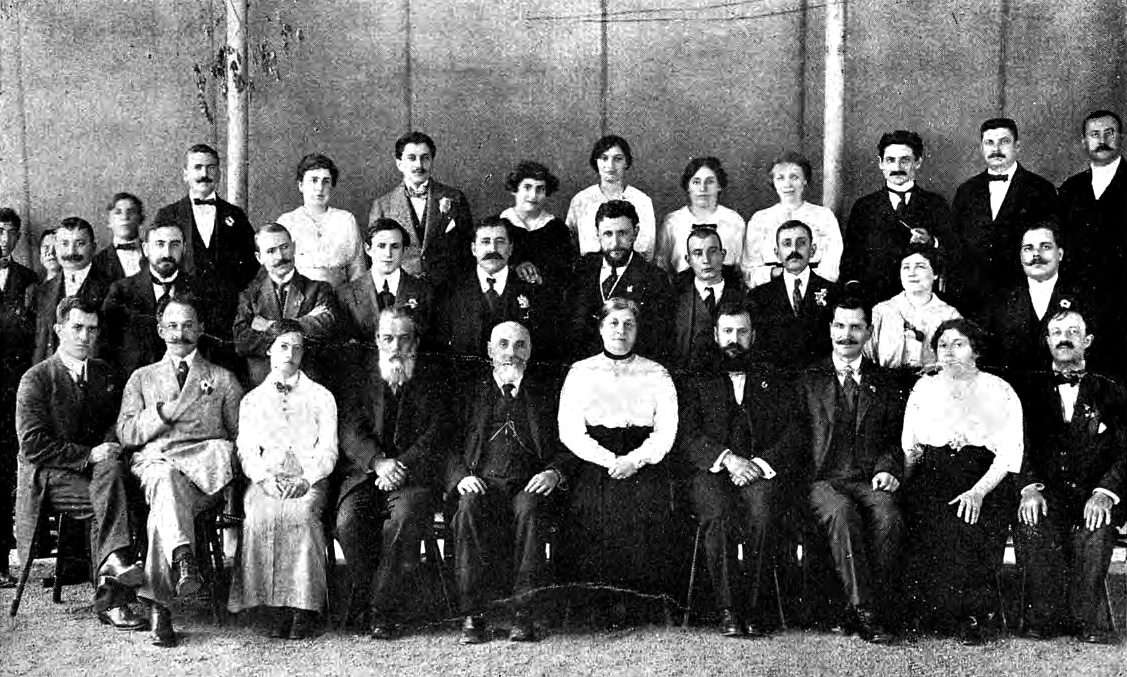
Călin (middle row, sixth from left) and other leaders of the Romanian Social Democratic Party at the 60th anniversary of Constantin Dobrogeanu-Gherea (1915)

A delegate to the 1914 PSD Congress, Călin advocated a more militant party position on the agrarian issue, and was decisive in the adoption of neutrality as the party's stance towards World War I. In October 1915, at the Extraordinary PSD Congress, he prepared the main report, which commented on the attitude of the European socialist movement towards the war. The report, critical of the Bureau of the Second International, adopted the anti-militarist stance of the first Zimmerwald Conference, while at the same time providing that, were Romania to join the war, the socialists would take no action that would damage the government. The report was approved by a large majority. At the same Congress, Călin was also elected to the party's Executive Committee, along with Ecaterina Arbore, Alecu Constantinescu, Gheorghe Cristescu, I.C. Frimu, Dimitrie Marinescu, and Christian Rakovsky. During the following months, he took part in the organisation of various anti-war protests across the country.

In the second part of 1916, as Romania joined the war on the side of the Entente, Călin was drafted as a combat medic, and was later assigned to the military ambulance. Retreating to Moldavia along with the whole Romanian Army, he contracted typhus during the epidemic that ravaged the region during the war. Transported to Iaşi for treatment, he died there in early April 1917. Over one thousand workers and socialists were present on 16 April [O.S. 3 April] at his burial, which became the first major socialist public gathering in Romania after the start of the war. The manifestation, and especially the anti-war eulogy given by Bujor, which called on the Romanian workers to follow the example of the anti-monarchic revolution in Russia, resulted in a major crack-down by the authorities on the renascent socialist movement in Moldavia.
