= Mihail Gheorghiu Bujor =

Romanian lawyer, journalist and socialist militant (1881–1964)

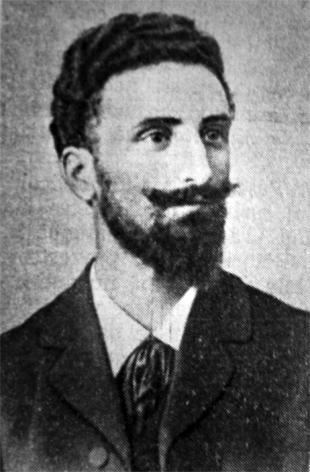

Member of the Great National Assembly
- In office 1948–1964

Member of the Assembly of Deputies
- In office 1946–1948

People's Commissar of Foreign Affairs of the Bessarabian SSR
- In office May 1919 – June 1919
- Preceded by: Daniil Ridel

Personal details
- Born: November 8, 1881 Iași, Kingdom of Romania
- Died: June 17, 1964 (aged 82) Bucharest, Romanian People's Republic
- Party: Romanian Communist Party (1921–1964)
- Other political affiliations: Socialist Party of Romania (1918–1921); Social Democratic Party of Romania (1910–1918); Social Democratic Workers' Party of Romania (1899–1900)
- Education: University of Iași
- Occupation: lawyer, politician, diplomat

Mihail Gheorghiu Bujor (November 8, 1881 – June 17, 1964) was a Romanian lawyer, journalist and socialist militant. A notable figure regarding the early Romanian labour movement, he embraced communism during World War I and organised Romanian armed detachments in Odesa in support of the October Revolution, hoping to incite a revolution in his native country. A political prisoner in Romania throughout much of the interwar period and during World War II, he held several minor political offices after the establishment of communist rule in the late 1940s.

== Early life ==
Mihail Gh. Bujor was born in Iași, the sixth of twelve children of Gheorghe Gheorghiu, a civil servant. The family was considered somewhat affluent, being able to afford the luxury of providing adequate education for all twelve children. Three of the children died from tuberculosis, followed shortly by their parents when Mihail was a teenager. The quick succession of deaths is credited with transforming Mihail into an atheist.

After completing a local high school, Bujor enrolled in the school of law at the University of Iași, also following the courses of several other faculties, such as literature, philosophy, and natural sciences. Coming into contact with socialist ideas, he decided to join the Romanian Social Democratic Workers' Party at age 16; however, he was rejected on account of his young age. He would eventually be admitted at age 18, shortly before the party's demise. While in university, he participated in several Marxist study circles, such as the Circle of Social Studies of the Socialists of Moldavia, organized by Max Wexler and Litman Ghelerter, and the Circle for the Enlightenment of the Workers of Iași. Conscripted in 1901, he served in a Vânători de munte battalion and was discharged in 1902 with the rank of second lieutenant.

== Reorganisation of the socialist movement ==
In 1901 Bujor began to write articles for Cronica ("The Chronicle"), a Bucharest newspaper, and continued to do so until 1904. He subsequently moved to Bucharest and, starting with 1902, also became a regular contributor to România Muncitoare, the main socialist press venue revived by Christian Rakovsky. Among his collaborators were socialist militants I. C. Frimu and Alecu Constantinescu. After Iosif Nădejde left the newspaper for the more moderate Adevărul, Bujor took over the position of editor-in-chief. During this period he led an intense press activity towards the reorganisation of the Romanian socialist movement, coming to be recognised as one of its foremost representatives. He was especially vocal in his support of rebelling peasants during the 1907 Romanian Peasants' Revolt. Among other actions, he issued a manifesto titled Către concentrați și rezerviști ("To the assembled and reserve soldiers"), calling on the army to stop firing on the rebels.

As a result of his activity, Bujor was elected in the Committee of the Socialist Union during the second Conference of trade unions and socialist circles of June 1907. The other members of the Committee were Rakovsky, Frimu, N. D. Cocea and Gheorghe Cristescu. He continued to contribute to the socialist press, founding Viitorul social ("The social future"), a theoretical journal published in Iaşi in 1907-1908. Among the topics Bujor addressed or militated for was the replacement of the censitary suffrage used at the time in Romania with the universal suffrage. In 1910, the concentrated efforts of the members of the Socialist Union led to the organisation of a Congress for the restoration of the Social Democratic Party of Romania (PSDR). During the Congress, Bujor, who had taken an important role in its preparations, presented the new party's political platform, as well as its agrarian platform. Both documents were heavily influenced by the thinking of Constantin Dobrogeanu-Gherea, the main ideologue of the new party. The Congress also elected Bujor in the Executive Committee of the party.

== World War I and Russian Revolution ==
After World War I started, the Romanian Social Democratic Party adopted a pacifist stance and supported the neutrality of Romania. Mihail Gh. Bujor participated in the 1914 extraordinary Congress of the PSDR and the July 1915 Bucharest Inter-Balkan Socialist Conference, which adopted strong anti-war declarations. In 1916 Romania's government decided to join the war on the side of the Entente, and PSDR was outlawed for its positions. The Romanian campaign however proved disastrous, and the southern half of the country was overrun by the forces of the Central Powers. Bujor left for Moldavia, the unoccupied part of the country, along with the government and a large part of the population. The February Revolution of 1917 led to a revival of the socialist movement in Iași, as the local socialist club was reopened and a new newspaper, Social-Democraţia ("Social-democracy"), was published. There, Bujor came into contact with revolutionary elements of the Russian army stationed in Romania, and began militating for a similar evolution in Romania. Thus, in a eulogy at the funerals of former party leader Ottoi Călin on April 16, Bujor denounced war as an instrument foreign to the interests of proletariat and urged the public to extend the influence of the Russian revolution. Considering socialists a threat to its authority and the stability of the front, the Romanian government decided to clamp down on the movement by dissolving the clubs, banning their publications, and arresting their leaders, including Bujor. The imprisonment did not last long, as, after the May Day parade organised by the Russian military units in Iași, a group of Romanian socialists and workers accompanied by Russian soldiers set him free. In the same evening Bujor left for Odesa in southern Ukraine, along with Rakovsky, who had been freed in a similar manner on the same day. The local soviet of the Russian soldiers provided them with a train and an armed escort.

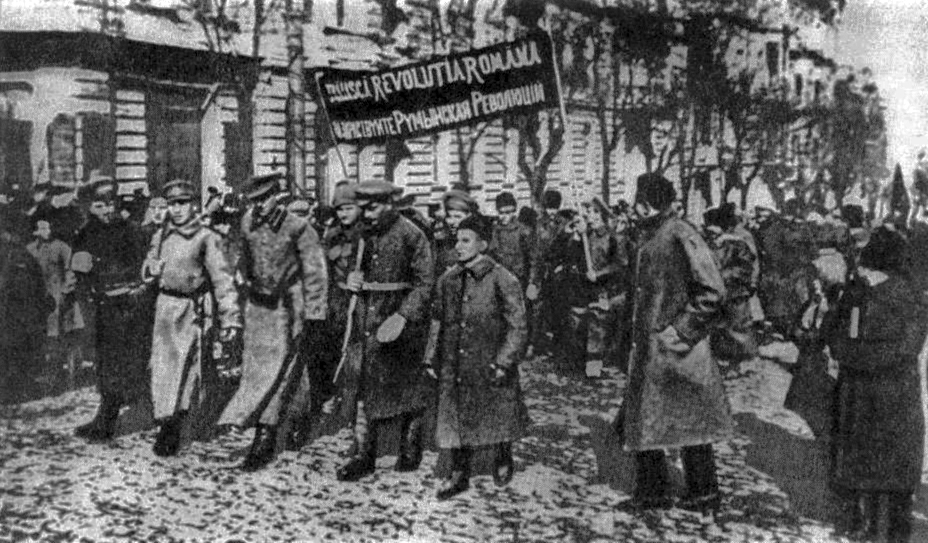
Romanian revolutionary regiment marching in Odesa in January 1918

In Odesa, Bujor and Rakovsky organised the Romanian Committee for Social-Democratic Action, the latter leaving for Petrograd soon after. The committee, which also included socialists Ion Dic Dicescu, Alexandru Nicolau, and Alter Zalic, sought to mobilize the sizeable Romanian workers population in the region, many of them evacuated from Romania along with strategic factories in the wake of the German invasion. Bujor also maintained contact with the socialists in Iași, supplying them with printed manifestos, and in Odessa he organised a revolutionary armed battalion from local Romanian soldiers. The committee requisitioned several Romanian vessels moored in Russian Black Sea ports and rechristened them with revolutionary names. Starting with September 5, 1917, the Committee headed by Bujor also began to print the newspaper Lupta ("The Struggle"), with the help of local revolutionaries. A more radical discourse was adopted, with calls for the extension of the Russian Revolution in Romania and the overthrow of the monarchy. However, the committee supported a bourgeois-democratic revolution rather than an outright socialist one, as Romania was seen as too backward for socialism to succeed. Generally, it was supportive of the Russian Provisional Government, not making clear differences between Mensheviks and Bolsheviks.

After the October Revolution, Bujor, although reserved at first, sided with the Bolsheviks, and in December he left for Petrograd to meet the new leadership. The committee also changed its position towards communist revolution in Romania, considering it as both feasible and necessary. In February 1918 Bujor met Lenin, who appointed him a member in the High College for the Struggle against Counter-revolution in the South, a provisional military command. Together with Dicescu, he edited a collection of secret documents from the Russian diplomatic archives, exposing the negotiations between Romania and Entente predating the former's entry into war, as well as later French-Russian talks dismissing Romanian territorial claims. On January 10, 1918, the Odesa committee was transformed into the Romanian National Committee against the Counter-revolution in Romania, and Bujor was soon joined by Rakovsky. The committee decided to fight against the Romanian government, whom they considered to be controlled by the bourgeoisie and the landowners, and to help start a revolution inside the country. A Soviet offensive in Romanian-controlled Bessarabia was also prepared for late February, but developments on the international scene prevented a major attack. After the signing of the Treaty of Brest-Litovsk and the occupation of Ukraine by the German Army, Bujor decided to remain in Odesa. Arrested by the Germans, he was handed over to the Whites, however he was soon set free after a successful Soviet counter-offensive liberated the city. In March 1919 he was appointed to the southern bureau of the newly founded Third International, and between May and June he served as People's Commissar for Foreign Affairs in the provisional government of the short-lived Bessarabian Soviet Socialist Republic.

== Imprisonment and later life ==
At the end of 1919, Mihail Gh. Bujor returned to Romania, where he militated for the transformation of Socialist Party of Romania (PSR) into a communist party. To that end, he wrote several manifestos, pamphlets and articles in the socialist press. Bujor also contributed to the documents that were to be presented in the following congress of the PSR. He would not participate in the congress, as he was arrested in March 1920 by the Romanian authorities. Bujor was sentenced to death for treason, however, following major workers' protests, the sentence was commuted to hard labour for life. Nevertheless, in the 1920 general election he won a seat for Galați in the Chamber of Deputies, the lower house of the Romanian Parliament. The parliamentary majority invalidated his mandate along with the ones of several other PSR members which had won the popular vote. That year, he was detained at Ocnele Mari Prison, the first political prisoner to be held there.

Bujor spent most of the interwar period imprisoned at Doftana, with long periods under solitary confinement. Following a long campaign of socialist and communist-minded intellectuals, he was eventually amnestied in 1934. Bujor attempted to use his position as an early socialist leader and former political prisoner to organise a united front of the socialist movement of Romania, at the time split between the restored Romanian Social Democratic Party (PSD), the Unitary Socialist Party (PSU), and the Peasant Workers' Bloc (BMȚ). His initiative, although actively supported by the PSU, failed as the PSD and the communist-dominated BMŢ refused to negotiate with each other. As the Romanian government became increasingly authoritarian, Bujor was arrested again in 1937 and imprisoned at Jilava. During World War II, as Romania joined Nazi Germany in the invasion of the Soviet Union, he was interned along other prominent communists in the Târgu Jiu camp. Set free after Romania joined the Allies, he was elected in the reformed unicameral Parliament in the wake of the 1944 coup d'état, and; after the republic was proclaimed in December 1947, he was elected to the Great National Assembly. In this period, he became a member of the Romanian Society for Friendship with the Soviet Union, and travelled to the Soviet Union, despite his disapproval of the Moscow trials. The elder Bujor received several honorific positions after Joseph Stalin's death, such as the presidency of the Association of the Former Antifascist Political Prisoners and membership in the General Council of the International Federation of Resistance Fighters.
