= Ion Dic Dicescu =

Ion Dic-Dicescu (born Ion Dicescu; Russian: Ива́н О́сипович Дик, romanized: Ivan Osipovich Dik; May 1893 – January 4, 1938) was a Romanian socialist journalist and officer and later Bolshevik activist who held command positions in the Red Army during the Russian Civil War. After the war, he held research positions in the economical domain at several Soviet universities and research institutes, before being executed on accusations of espionage during the Great Purge. His elder son, Iosif Dik, although losing both hands and an eye fighting in the Red Army during World War II, was a successful children's writer in the post-war Soviet Union.

== Early life and World War I ==
Ion Dicescu was born in Bucharest, in the family of a house painter. Unable to enroll in a university due to material constraints, he enrolled instead in the local Commercial School, also working as a public accountant in order to support himself. He joined the Social Democratic Party of Romania at 18, in the same period, also becoming a contributor to the party's magazine, România Muncitoare. There, he collaborated with several important figures of the Romanian socialist movement, such as Mihail Gheorghiu Bujor, N. D. Cocea, Alecu Constantinescu, or Dimitrie Marinescu, being promoted to assistant editor-in-chief in 1914. He also edited an atheist magazine, Rațiunea ("The Rationality"), where he addressed themes such as natural sciences, philosophy and sociology, also publishing fragments from Karl Marx's Das Kapital and other European materialist philosophers.

In 1914, after the start of World War I, Dicescu was called up to arms as an infantry sub-lieutenant. As Romania was still neutral at the time, he worked as a correspondent for the left-wing newspaper Adevărul. Beginning with 1916, when Romania declared war on the Central Powers, he also participated in combat, retreating to Moldavia with the rest of the Romanian Army. At the beginning of 1917, Dicescu, gravely wounded, was evacuated to allied Russia, where the Romanian Army had established several military hospitals. He was ultimately moved to Petrograd, around the time of the February Revolution. During convalescence, he worked as an accountant for the local plant part of the Renault group.

== Russian Revolution and Civil War ==
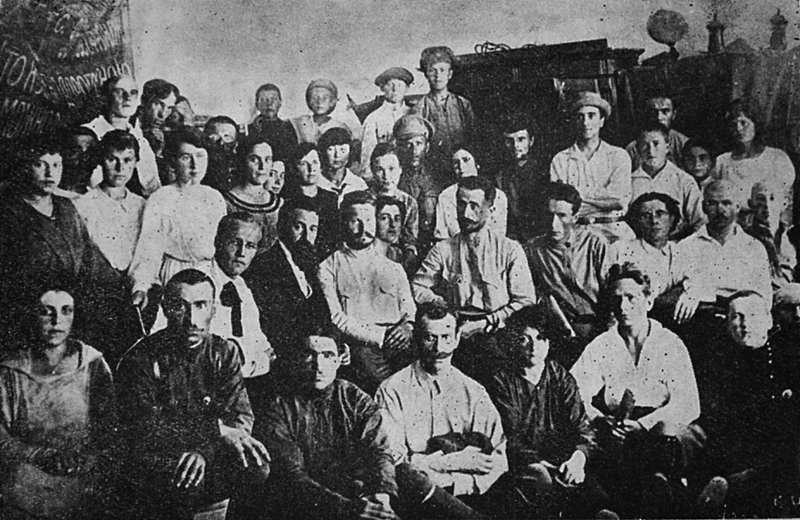
Ion Dic Dicescu (front row, second from left) along with fellow Romanian Ghiță Moscu in the political section of the Turkestan Front, 1919-1920

Meeting communist workers and being an avid reader of the Bolshevik press, Ion Dicescu was quickly won to the cause of the revolution. In April, he joined the Communist Party (bolsheviks) and began collaboration with their newspaper, Pravda. During the October Revolution, he fought in the Petrograd Red Guards and participated in the Second Congress of Soviets. In November of the same year, he began working for the People's Commissariat for Foreign Affairs.

In early 1918, Dicescu left for Sevastopol and later Odessa. In Odessa, he met the Romanian Revolutionary Committee, set up by socialist émigrés Gheorghiu-Bujor and Alexandru Nicolau, contributed to the creation of a newspaper, Lupta, and helped organize pro-Soviet Romanian volunteers into military units. By February, infantry and marines battalions were set up, composed mostly of evacuated workers, but also from Romanians fighting in the Austro-Hungarian Army who had been captured as POWs. Dicescu was elected secretary of the Odessa Romanian Military-Revolutionary Committee tasked with preparing a revolution in neighbouring Romania. Plans were thwarted, however, by the German advance in the region in the aftermath of the Treaty of Brest-Litovsk. Dicescu continued to fight both the Germans and the Ukrainian National Republic before retreating to the interior of Soviet Russia.

Soon after, Dicescu, along with other Romanians, joined the Soviet Army led by Mikhail Frunze, being tasked with setting up international detachments. Appreciated for his political position and military aptitudes, in April 1919, Dicescu became political commissar in the Operative Service of Political Office of the 4th Soviet Army, participating in the fights against the White forces led by Alexander Kolchak and Anton Denikin. From May to June, he also worked as war correspondent for Pravda. In January 1920, he was sent to the East, being named political commissar of the Turkestan Front, and was tasked with protecting food transports towards Moscow, Petrograd, and Voronezh. During his tenure, he had the occasion to personally meet Vladimir Lenin. Towards the end of May 1920, he was sent, on Joseph Stalin's order, to the Southwestern Front. He later worked for the Intelligence Service of the General Staff of the Southern Front and the Revolutionary Military Council.

== Academic career and later life ==
Beginning with 1922, Ion Dicescu studied at the Moscow Military Academy, and later he taught courses at the Communist University of the National Minorities of the West, the Communist University of the Toilers of the East, the Plekhanov Institute and the Architectural Institute. Dicescu also held various research positions at the People's Commissariat for Finance, Central Statistical Directorate and the State Committee for Planning (Gosplan), publishing over 50 scientific works regarding the Soviet economy. Towards the end of the 1930s he was named Deputy Head of the Gosplan.

In 1924, Dicescu was one of the authors of a memorandum that requested the creation of a Moldavian Soviet Republic on the border with Romania, on the territory of the Ukrainian SSR. The memorandum stated the primary goal of such an endeavour as fomenting a revolution in neighbouring Bessarabia, and ultimately in the whole of Romania. A proponent of Moldovan-Romanian identity, Dicescu was a strong supporter of the Romanianization and Latinization of the new republic. Such views were however regarded with suspicion by the Bessarabian communists living in the Soviet Union, the Ukrainian leadership, as well as by the local population. Ultimately, when the Moldavian Autonomous Soviet Socialist Republic was created in 1924, the Soviet authorities decided to follow a policy emphasizing the difference between the local Moldovans and Romanians. Dicescu reacted by sending a new memorandum to various Soviet leaders, in an unsuccessful attempt to steer the cultural policy in the republic.

On April 5, 1937, during the Great Purge, Dicescu was arrested and, on January 4, 1938, the Military Collegium of the Supreme Court of the USSR sentenced him to death on charges of espionage. He was executed on the same day at Kommunarka, near Moscow. He was posthumously rehabilitated by a decision of the Soviet Supreme Court in June 1956, and by a Plenary Session of the Central Committee of the Romanian Communist Party in April 1968.
