= Max Wexler =

Romanian socialist activist and journalist (1870–1917)

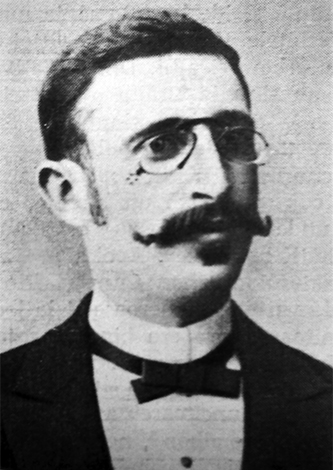
- Born: 4 November 1870; Iaşi, Romania
- Died: 14 May 1917 (aged 46); Bacău, Romania
- Other names: Argeşanu, Luca Alexandru, Gentilis, Germanicus, Neuschatz, I. Moldoveanu, Ieşeanu
- Occupation: accountant

Max Wexler (also spelled Vexler or Wechsler, 4 November 1870 – 14 May 1917) was a Romanian socialist activist and journalist, regarded as one of the main Marxist theorist of the early Romanian workers' movement.

Active in the first Romanian socialist party, the Romanian Social Democratic Workers' Party, he became dissatisfied with the party's passivity and its failure to openly support political rights for the Romanian Jews, initiating a separate Jewish socialist group. Following the party's demise, he was one of the main activists for the revival of the socialist movement in Iaşi, introducing to Marxism many future leaders of the Romanian socialist parties. Sympathetic to the 1917 February Revolution, he was arrested after attempting to gain the support of Russian soldiers present in the country during World War I. Wexler was assassinated in custody shortly after, with the Romanian authorities suppressing any formal enquiry into his death.

== Biography ==
=== Early life and the PSDMR ===
Max Wexler was born in Iaşi, north-eastern Romania, in a family of Jewish origin. After finishing his compulsory education, having noted Romanian writer Ion Creangă as a teacher during the primary school, he enrolled in the local School of Commerce, graduating as an accountant in 1889. He would later study towards becoming a candidate in philosophy and literature at the Université Nouvelle, a left-wing splinter of the Free University of Brussels. Learning about socialist ideas during his commercial school years, Wexler joined the informal Socialist Party of Iaşi at nineteen, which was to join forces with the other socialist clubs in the nationwide Romanian Social Democratic Workers' Party (PSDMR) in 1893. Around the same period he met Litman Ghelerter, who became a close friend and one of his principal political collaborators.

Gradually becoming one of the leaders of the Iaşi socialists, Wexler became involved in PSDMR's national politics. In 1894, after the leadership decided to curb the radicalism of Munca, the party newspaper, by appointing moderate Ioan Nădejde as editor, Wexler-led socialists authored a proposal that sought to expand the journal outreach. Among the envisioned actions were an increase in publication frequency and an expansion of discussed themes to include scientific and literary topics, news about foreign socialist movements, and articles related to the agrarian question. While the proposal was rejected, Wexler continued to press for a more militant position of the Romanian socialists. He therefore co-wrote, with L. Ghelerter, the draft for a new party statute, which was presented before the Third PSDMR Congress in April 1895. In the draft several proposals were made towards a better organization of the party, providing the formalization of local party sections and the establishment of clear duties for the party leadership and responsibilities for the various party bodies. Notable were also the provision that forbade simultaneous membership in the PSDMR and in other political organizations, and the one requiring any dispute among members to be first discussed within the party. Due to the opposition of the bourgeois members of the party leadership, the draft was rejected by the Congress, which mandated the General Council to draft a new statute project for a future Congress.

Soon after, Wexler and the other socialists around the periodical Lumina emerged as a dissident group, which was eventually excluded from the party. The dissidents deplored the tactics adopted by party leadership, which in their opinion did not actively seek to increase the party's influence among the urban proletariat. Furthermore, they accused the party organ, Lumea Nouă, of losing its socialist character. The break with the official party was also partly motivated by disagreement of the Lumina supporters with the formers ambiguous position towards the question of Jewish naturalization in Romania. Thus, the dissident group quickly evolved as a primarily Jewish socialist grouping, acting until 1897 as separate from the Iaşi Workers' Club. Beginning with 1896, the leaders of the group, Wexler, Ghelerter and Leon Gheller, also edited a Yiddish language weekly, Der Veker. As none of the editors were familiar with literary Yiddish, at first they wrote mostly in Romanian and had their articles translated by a local teacher.

A labour organizer, Wexler was elected president of the Clerks' Society in 1896 and worked together with Bucharest-based Vintilă Rosetti in order to obtain improvements of working conditions, such as the eight-hour day and Sunday rest. During the same period, together with Barbu Brănişteanu, he was a delegate to the national conference of civil servants and commerce, finance and industry clerks.

=== Towards the restoration of a Social Democratic Party ===
As the PSDMR had disbanded in 1899 in the aftermath of the defection of several of its leaders to the National Liberal Party (PNL), Wexler was one of the supporters of a renewed socialist party. Thus, between 1899 and 1900, became a regular writer for Lumea Nouă, by then edited by a group of mostly proletarian socialists. Towards the same objective, in August 1903 he established the Iaşi Circle of Social Studies, of which he was one of the foremost lecturers, with the support of Dr. Ghelerter. Many of the students attending the Circle would later become leading figures of the Romanian socialist movement: Mihail Gheorghiu Bujor, Ion Sion, Ottoi Călin, Ilie Moscovici. Wexler's lecture topics included party tactics, the Erfurt Program, the history of Christianity and the Jewish question. During the Circle sessions he exposed A. C. Cuza's PhD thesis as a plagiarism, with many of the arguments being later presented in a book published by another member of the Circle, Emanoil Socor. Active in the Socialist Union of Romania, established in 1907, he was elected during its January 1908 conference a member in the commission tasked with revising the political program of the organization. The commission also included Constantin Dobrogeanu-Gherea, Christian Rakovsky, Mihail Gh. Bujor, N. D. Cocea and Ion Sion. Beginning with the refoundation of the Social Democratic Party (PSD) in 1910, Wexler was to become one of the main leaders of its Iaşi section. In 1914, together with Dr. Ghelerter, he rented a building in Iaşi that would serve during the following years both as their home and the headquarters of the local Social-Democratic Club and Trade Union Commission.

Throughout his life, Wexler kept in contact with several luminaries of the European socialist movement of the time, such as Karl Kautsky, Max Beer, Franz Mehring, Heinrich Cunow, Georg Ledebour, Arthur Stadthagen and Rosa Luxemburg. Friend and collaborator of Constantin Dobrogeanu-Gherea, he was an active contributor to the Romanian socialist press, writing for, among others, Munca, România Muncitoare (known as Lupta beginning with 1914), Lumina, Viitorul Social, Convorbiri sociale. In order to avert the anti-Jewish prejudice prevalent among the Romanian public, Wexler commonly used pseudonyms. Thus, he notably signed one of his major contribution to Romanian Marxism, The socialism in Romania published in Viitorul Social, under the name of a fellow party-member, ethnic Romanian Ion Sion. The article considers the applicability of socialist ideas in the specific context of Romanian economy, paralleling Gherea's theory about the "Marxism in backward countries".

A speaker of German, French, Polish and Russian, Wexler wrote articles for Die Neue Zeit and other European socialist newspapers and magazines, also translating several socialist works into Romanian. The articles he authored dealt primarily with theoretical problems of the workers' movement, and in his writings he opposed both antisemitism and zionism. Beside his socialist activity, Wexler also published his translation of Émile Zola's Germinal, took interest in prehistory and philology, and published works related to his professional activity, such as a study of interest rates presented at the St. Louis World's Fair. During the first decades of the twentieth century he helped smuggle over the Pruth, towards the Russian Empire, left-wing literature written in Russian, Polish and Yiddish, most of it originating in Switzerland. His frequent contacts with the Russian revolutionaries also made him a target of surveillance by the police and the Siguranţa.

=== World War I and assassination ===
During the internal PSD debates that followed the start of World War I, Wexler disagreed with the party's support for the resolutions of the Zimmerwald Conference. Specifically, he concluded that the call to overthrow capitalism in case of war was not applicable to Romania, which had not yet fully experienced a "bourgeois-democratic revolution". After Romania entered the war on the side of Entente, Wexler was mobilized as chief accountant and cashier in an Iaşi enterprise. In 1917 he welcomed the Russian February Revolution, and, along with Bujor, took part in the May Day parade organized by revolutionary Russian soldiers in the city. As a result, two days later his mobilization order was overturned and he was drafted into the active army duty, despite his age and failing health. Suspected of taking part in Rakovsky's escape during the demonstrations, he was brought under armed escort before the court martial in Bacău. Briefly released and sent back to Iaşi, he was soon placed under the guard of the 2nd Huntsmen Regiment. There, on the night of 14 May, he was sent towards the local command post, under an escort headed by Lieutenant Romalo, close friend of the Romanian heir apparent, Carol. On the way, while passing through a forest, Wexler was shot in the back of his head by one of the guards, ostensibly because he was attempting to escape custody. According to the socialist press, his assassination had been planned by the military authorities with the acknowledgement of the PNL leadership, and his killer was rewarded with a bottle of rum, an insignificant amount of money, and promotion to the rank of sergeant.

Wexler's death was followed by public outcry, leading to agitation among the Russian soldiers present on Romanian territory and bringing the attention of the Petrograd government. Summoned by the Russian envoy to Romania, prime-minister Ion I. C. Brătianu expressed regret about the death, undertook to suspend the application of the death penalty, and promised a thorough investigation will take place. War minister Vintilă Brătianu sent two letters to the General Headquarters requesting further research into the matter, also enquiring whether the shooting was deliberate or was the result of a misinterpretation of orders. Nevertheless, no formal inquiry was ever started into the death of Wexler. According to the memories of Gheorghe Gh. Mârzescu, member of the government at the time, the story of an attempted escape had been proven false, but the investigation was suppressed following the intervention of Romalo's father, the physician of the Romanian royal family. As late as 1922, the whereabouts of Wexler's remains were unknown.
