= Alexandru Nicolau =

Romanian lawyer and activist

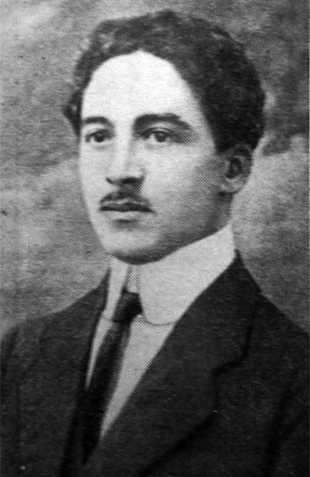
- Born: January 1889; Bucharest, Kingdom of Romania
- Died: September 27, 1937 (aged 48); Moscow, Soviet Union
- Cause of death: Executed
- Resting place: Donskoy Cemetery, Moscow
- Other name: Aleksandr Aleksandrovich Nikolau
- Education: University of Bucharest; University of Paris
- Occupations: Lawyer, socialist activist, communist activist
- Employer(s): Communist University of the National Minorities of the West; Moscow Institute of Foreign Languages
- Political party: Social Democratic Party of Romania; Communist Party of the Soviet Union

Alexandru Nicolau (Russian: Александр Александрович Николау, romanized: Aleksandr Aleksandrovich Nikolau; January 1889 – September 27, 1937) was a Romanian lawyer, socialist and later communist activist. Active in the Romanian and French socialist movements before and during World War I, he left for Russia during the 1917 Revolutions. There, he became one of the organisers of Romanian volunteer detachments in support of the Soviets. Arrested shortly after returning to Romania in 1920, he left for Soviet Russia after a successful prison escape. During the later part of his life he held teaching positions at several Soviet universities, before falling victim to the Great Purge in 1937. His name was posthumously rehabilitated both in the Soviet Union and in his native Romania.

== Biography ==
=== Early life and activity ===
Nicolau was born in Bucharest in 1889. As a student at the Saint Sava High School, he befriended Constantin Titel Petrescu and Mihail Cruceanu, both of whom would later become known as socialist militants. After finishing his secondary education, Nicolau trained as a lawyer, receiving a degree from the University of Bucharest and a PhD in Paris, before being admitted to the Bucharest Bar. His first contacts with the Romanian socialist movement, still in disarray during that period, came through his membership in the Bucharest's Study Circle of the Socialist Students between 1908 and 1909. Soon after he began writing for România Muncitoare, the main socialist press venue. One of his first notable contributions was his correspondence from Italy, criticising the reformist stance of the local socialist party. In 1911, România Muncitoare published Nicolau's anti-militarist manifesto To the recruits. Recalling the army's contribution in suppressing the 1907 Peasants' revolt, the brochure called on the new recruits to choose a different path and refuse to support the government crackdown on the demands of the workers and the peasant. As a result, in May 1912 he was put under trial before the Court of the Ilfov County, where he reaffirmed the ideas expressed in the manifesto. Defended by fellow socialists Mihail Gh. Bujor, Toma Dragu and Titel Petrescu, and by socialist sympathizer Constantin Mille, Nicolau was eventually acquitted by the jury. In June 1912, along with Constantin Dobrogeanu Gherea, Ecaterina Arbore and others, he represented the Bucharest Socialist Club at the Fifth Congress of the Social Democratic Party of Romania (PSDR), being elected a member in the committee of the party's publishing house. In order to escape harassment from the authorities, Nicolau chose to leave Romania for Paris, where he continued his law studies at the Sorbonne, and joined the French Section of the Workers' International.

=== World War I and Russian Revolution ===
In 1916, Romania joined World War I on the side of the Entente and imposed an immediate ban on the local socialist movement, which had adopted a militant pacifist stance. Nicolau reacted by publishing in Paris a study highly critical of the Romanian ruling classes, titled The Crime of the Romanian Oligarchy. Returning to Romania later in the war, he was kept under constant surveillance by Siguranța, the secret police. Nicolau was present in Iași during the revolutionary agitation which emerged during the 1917 May Day celebrations and under the impression of the February Revolution. Along the other social-democrats, he supported the position of the PSD leader Christian Rakovsky, who believed the situation in Romania was not ripe for the overthrow of the monarchy.

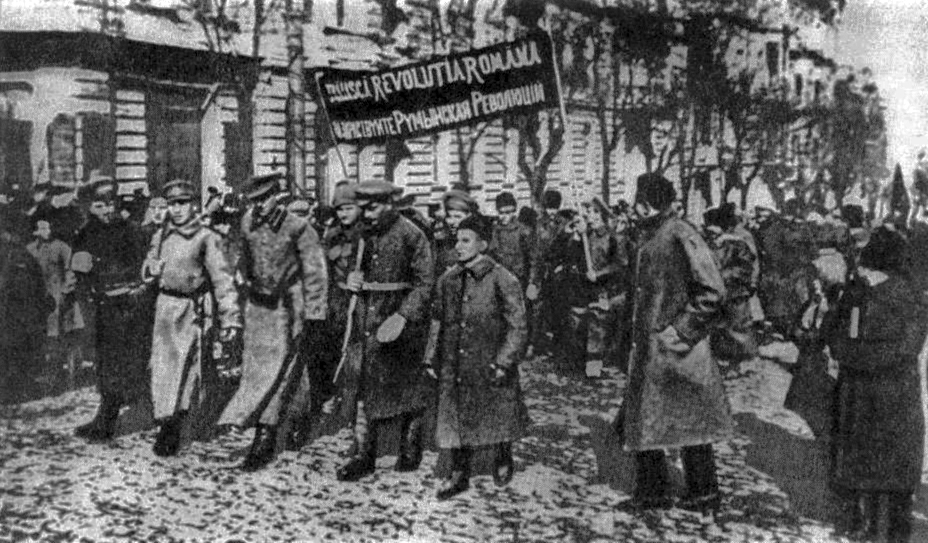
Romania volunteer regiment marching in Odessa in January 1918

Joining Rakovsky and Bujor, Nicolau left in June 1917 for Russia, where he entered the Russian Social Democratic Labour Party (bolsheviks). He settled in Odessa and, along with Bujor, Ion Dic Dicescu, and Alter Zalic, he was one of the organisers and afterwards leaders of the Romanian Committee for Social-Democratic Action established in the city. Nicolau also became the editor of Lupta ("The Struggle"), which presented itself as the successor of România Muncitoare (renamed in 1914 to Lupta zilnică, "The Daily Struggle"). After the October Revolution, the Romanian socialists in Odessa saluted the new developments. Becoming increasingly communist in outlook, they also began agitating for a revolution in their home country. Such views were publicly expressed by Nicolau during his speech at the 2nd Congress of Rumcherod. In order to help the Soviets secure power in Southern Russia, on December 28, 1917, the committee established the Romanian Revolutionary Military Committee, which counted Nicolau, Bujor, and Dicescu among its leaders. The Revolutionary Committee worked in close cooperation with the Rumcherod, which provided it with material support. During the following period, two Romanian volunteer battalions were established by recruiting Romanian soldiers in Bessarabia and the Russian Black Sea ports, as well as workers who had been evacuated to Southern Russia. Between January and March 1918, the volunteers participated along the local Red Guards in battles against the troops of the Ukrainian People's Republic, the regular Romanian Army which had occupied Bessarabia, as well as against the Central Powers armies advancing from the Northwest.

The occupation of Odessa by Austro-German troops in the aftermath of the Treaty of Brest-Litovsk forced the volunteer battalions to retreat to Crimea and central Russia, with the members of the Action Committee either going underground or leaving for Russian areas still under Soviet control. In August 1918, Nicolau, Dicescu, and the other former members of the Action Committee which had reached Moscow created the Romanian Communist Revolutionary Committee. The new committee, proclaimed the official representative of the PSDR in Russia, established contacts with the socialists in Bucharest and initiated an outreach campaign amongst the Romanian POWs in Russia. In late 1918, the Committee joined another Romanian group, the radical agrarian Romanian Revolutionary Peasants' Party, to form an unified Romanian Communist group of the Russian Communist Party (bolsheviks). Nicolau was elected the group's chairman, with another PSDR member, Ion Pența, being elected secretary and representative to the Federation of Foreign Groups. Nicolau also began publishing regularly in Foaia țăranului, the former organ of the Revolutionary Peasants' Party. In 1919 the Publishing House of the Romanian Communist Groups in Soviet Russia published Nicolau's brochure The Socialist Revolution in Romania. The pamphlet acknowledged the Bolshevik support for the Romanian communists, and called on Romanians to follow the revolutionary path taken by the Russian communists under the leadership of Lenin. During August 1919, as the Soviets regained Odessa, Nicolau was one of the editors of the short-lived newspaper Scânteea.

=== Later life and death ===
Alexandru Nicolau returned to Romania in 1920, however he was soon apprehended by the authorities, and imprisoned in Jilava along with a larger group of communists, including Alecu Constantinescu. The group made a successful bid for escape on the night of December 2, 1920, and, following a short stay in Bulgaria, most escapees made their way to Moscow. On March 31, 1931, Nicolau was sentenced in absentia to death by the Romanian authorities. In Soviet Russia, he joined the local group of Romanian communists, and participated as a non-voting delegate in the Third World Congress of the Communist International, held in Moscow in June 1921. Nicolau also joined the Romanian section of the Communist University of the National Minorities of the West, where he lectured on topics such as history and social sciences, and worked as a teacher for the Moscow Institute of Foreign Languages.

Nicolau was among the Romanian Communist refugees in Soviet Russia who in 1924 signed a memorandum calling for the creation of a Moldovan national territory inside the Ukrainian Soviet Socialist Republic, near the disputed border with Romania. Along with Dicescu, the main author of the document, Nicolau considered Moldovans to be Romanians, and saw the new polity primarily as a base for propaganda across the Dniester, in Bessarabia and Romania. Such views were however rejected by the Bessarabian Communists who, after gaining the support of the Ukrainian leadership, enforced a cultural policy emphasizing the distinctiveness of Moldovan identity in the newly created Moldovan Autonomous Soviet Socialist Republic.

Arrested on August 14, 1937, during the Stalinist purges, Nicolau was sentenced to death on September 27, 1937, by the Military Collegium of the Supreme Court of the USSR on fabricated charges of "espionage and involvement in counter-revolutionary terrorist organisations". He was executed on the same day, and buried in the Donskoy Cemetery in Moscow.

He was posthumously rehabilitated on September 15, 1956, through a decision of the Soviet Supreme Court during the De-Stalinisation campaign. In a symbolic gesture, his name was also rehabilitated in Romania during the April 1968 Plenary Session of the Central Committee of the Romanian Communist Party.
