= I. C. Frimu =

Romanian politician (1871 - 1919)

Ion Costache Frimu
- Born: 16 October [O.S. 4 October] 1871; Bârzești, Vaslui County, Romania
- Died: 19 February [O.S. 6 February] 1919; Văcărești Prison, Bucharest, Kingdom of Romania
- Cause of death: Beatings and typhus contracted while in custody
- Burial place: Sfânta Vineri Cemetery, Grivița, Bucharest, Romania
- Occupations: carpenter, politician, and labor activist

Ion Costache Frimu (16 October [O.S. 4 October] 1871 – 19 February [O.S. 6 February] 1919) was a Romanian socialist militant and politician, a leading member of the Social Democratic Party of Romania (PSDR) and labor activist. He died after being beaten and contracting an illness in prison, where he was being held for his participation in the typographic workers' demonstration of December 1918.

== Biography ==
=== Early life ===
Frimu, born in Bârzești, Vaslui County, was a carpenter by trade. He was active in various trade unions after being appointed cashier of a fraternal society, and worked his way up through the hierarchy. On March 31, 1893, the Romanian Social-Democratic Workers' Party (PSDMR) was founded in Bucharest. Frimu was part of the leadership, as were Ioan Nădejde, Vasile Morțun, Constantin Dobrogeanu-Gherea, Alexandru Ionescu, Christian Rakovsky, Dimitrie Marinescu and Ilie Moscovici.

In December 1896, the Union of Guild Syndicates (USB) was founded, marking a crucial step in the centralization of workers' syndicate organisations. Frimu was elected president of the USB in 1898. In 1899 the PSDMR disbanded when various factions broke away (among them, that led by Morțun). The workers' clubs were also dissolved, with the exception of the Bucharest club, where individuals like Frimu, C. Z. Buzdugan and Rakovsky continued their activity. Around that time, he met the tailor and socialist sympathiser Rozalia (also known as Rozica), a Transylvanian-born orphan who had settled in Bucharest during her late teens, and whom he married in 1901.

=== România Muncitoare and PSDR ===
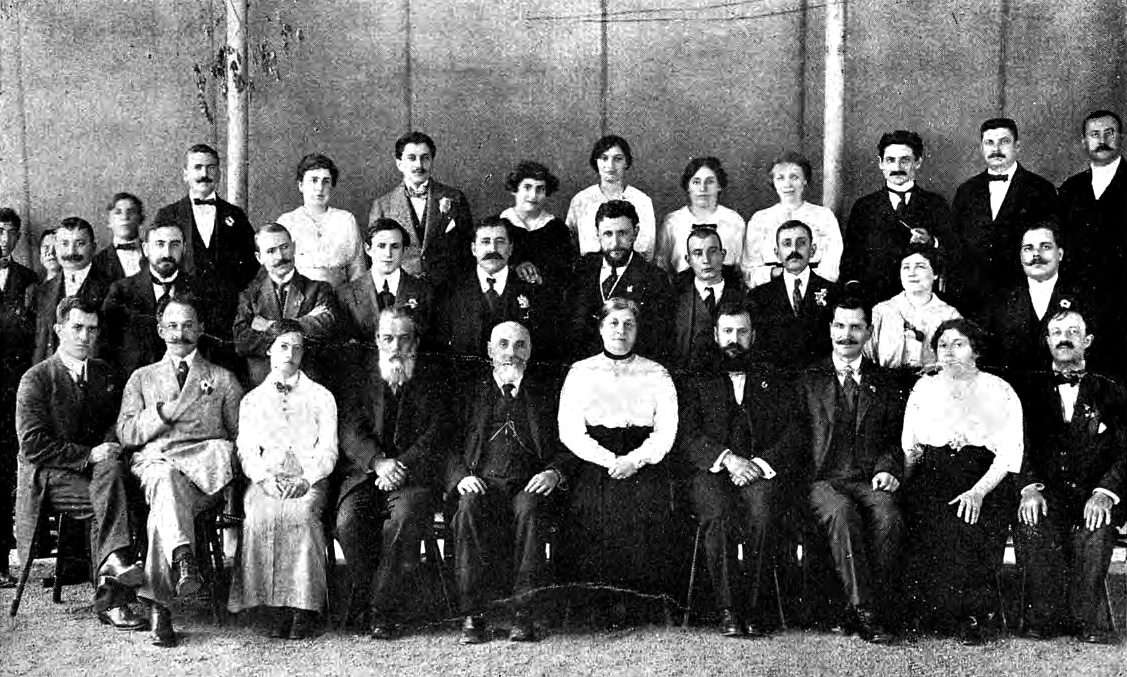
Romanian socialists at the celebration of the birthday of Constantin Dobrogeanu-Gherea in Ploiești (1915); Frimu is the third from the right in the first row

He founded and took part in the leadership of the newspaper România Muncitoare. In March 1905, I. C. Frimu helped establish the Bucharest Carpenters' Union (being elected its president), and, in 1907, joined the leadership of the Socialist Union of Romania — the embryo of the post-1910 PSDR. The Socialist Union's creation came at the same time as the Romanian Peasants' Revolt — the government's suspicion of the socialist camp resulted in the expulsion of many România Muncitoare contributors, Rakovsky among them; the Frimus maintained contact with the exiled (including the brothers Hoppe, who had settled in Vienna). In 1909, I. C. Frimu and the future novelist Panait Istrati were imprisoned at Văcărești Prison, after taking part in riots asking the National Liberal cabinet of Ion I. C. Brătianu to receive Rakovsky back into Romania.

On January 31, 1910, when the PSDR was founded, Frimu, Rakovsky (who had been allowed to return), Gheorghiu Bujor, Dimitrie Marinescu, and Constantin Vasilescu were elected among its leaders. With Rakovsky, Gheorghiu Bujor, and Ecaterina Arbore, Frimu gave lectures at the PSDR's propaganda school. After the outbreak of World War I, Frimu and the PSDR stood among the socialist internationalist opponents of the war, and Rakovsky played a major part in the Zimmerwald movement. As Romania entered the war on the side of the Entente Powers, the PSDR was banned and Rakovsky jailed. When the Central Powers occupied southern Romania (see Romanian Campaign), Frimu, who was himself jailed for his anti-war propaganda, followed the authorities to Moldavia.

In September 1917, I. C. Frimu and Alecu Constantinescu were the Romanian delegates to the third internationalists' conference against war in Stockholm. In late December 1918, he joined the Socialist Party of Romania, created around the PSDR.

=== December 13, 1918 workers' demonstration ===
On December 6, 1918, typesetters from the Sfetea and Minerva graphic design studios went on strike demanding better working and living conditions (a pay raise, an eight-hour day, etc.). As their demands were not met, all the typographers in Bucharest announced that they would strike a week later. On December 13, 1918 (NS December 26), a large socialist demonstration of Bucharest workers took place. Its principal organisers were Rakovsky, the typographers Iancu Luchwig and Sami Steinberg, the bootmaker Marcus Iancu, the proofreader Marcel Blumenfeld, Ilie Moscovici, Frimu, Gheorghe Cristescu, D. Pop and others.

That day, the capital's nearly 600 typesetters went on strike and moved toward the Ministry of Industry and Commerce, accompanying the delegation which they had designated to present their grievances. Workers from other Bucharest factories and plants joined the typographers in solidarity. The protesters shouted slogans such as "Down with the army! Down with the King! Long live the Republic!", and expected to end up before the National Theatre.

As soon as the columns of workers reached the square in front of the National Theatre, they were met by forces of public order, specifically the 9th Vânători de Munte Regiment, the police and the gendarmerie, commanded by police prefect General Ștefănescu and by the head of the Bucharest garrison, General Mărgineanu. These forces had gathered on Ion Câmpineanu Street, in Pasajul Român, with their commanders being located in the police station inside the passage. From inside the passage, General Mărgineanu placed a telephone call to Prime Minister Ion I. C. Brătianu, asking for his authorization to intervene against the demonstrators.

The forces of public order fired into the crowd; in the National Theatre Square 16 were killed and tens were wounded among the workers. Important figures from the cultural, artistic and political realms, such as Ioan Slavici, Nicolae Tonitza, and Gala Galaction, harshly condemned the government's repressive action. Hundreds of workers and members of the trade union movement and the Social Democratic Party were arrested and tortured.

=== Trial and death ===
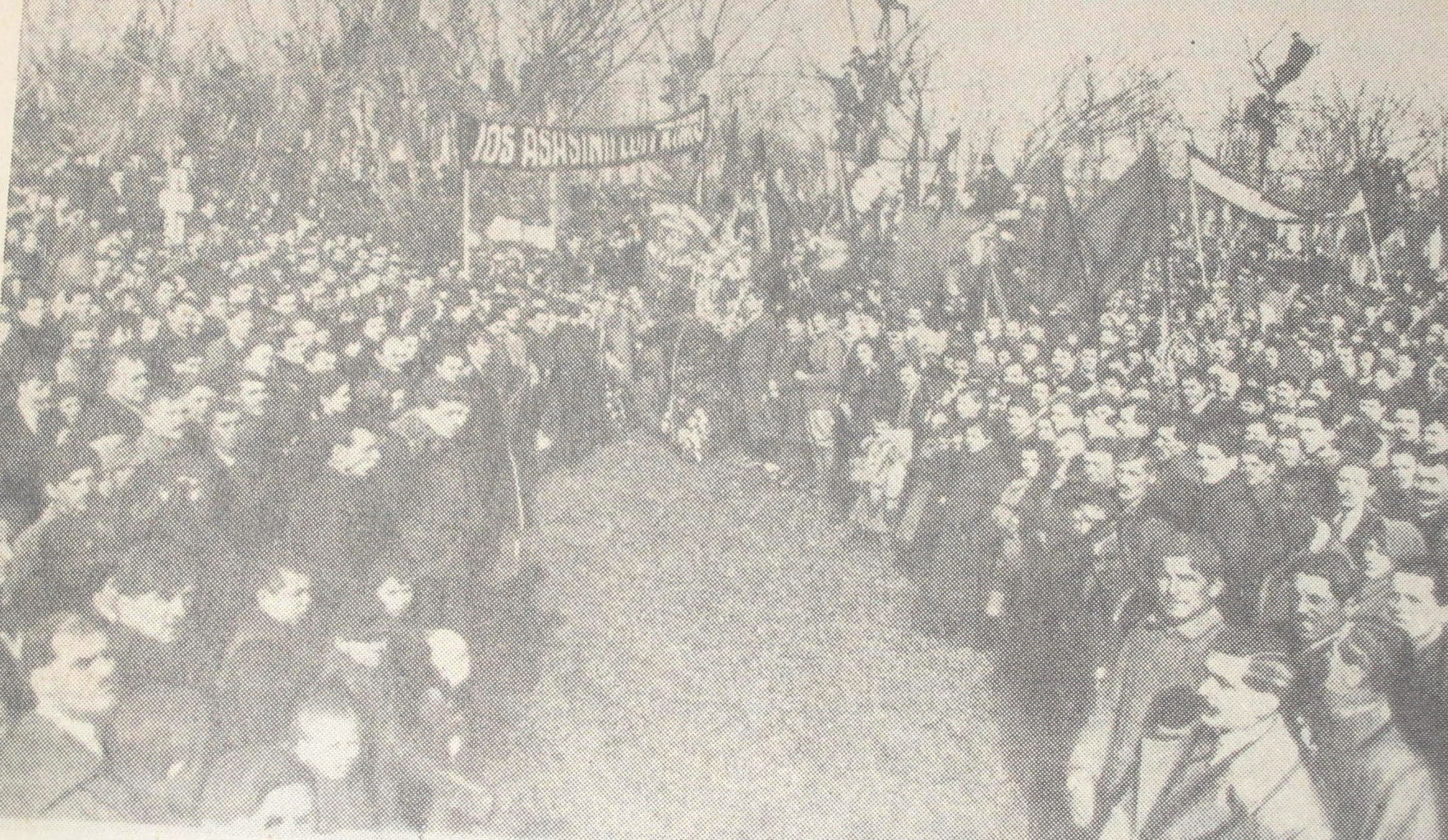
Demonstration during Frimu's burial

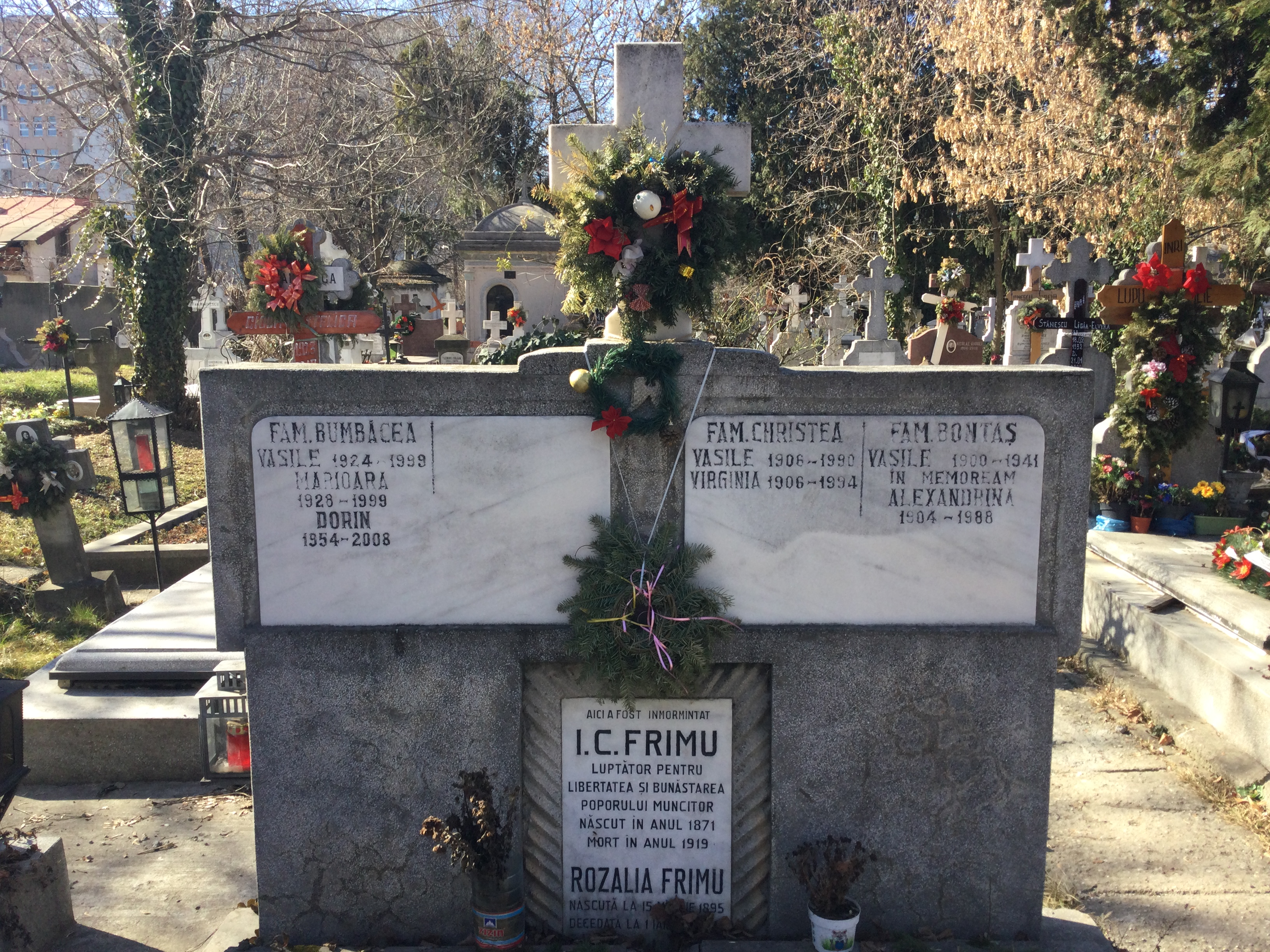
Grave at Sfânta Vineri Cemetery

The socialist lawyers Constantin Titel Petrescu, Constantin Mille, Radu D. Rosetti, Toma Dragu, and N. D. Cocea defended the arrested workers at trial. During the trial, the royal commissioner could not produce proof to back up his opening statement and thus the indictments, except against the Communist agitators, whom the Martial Court sentenced to 5 years imprisonment. The other workers were acquitted in February 1919.

Frimu, who had been accused of instigation, died in a prison hospital. His last days at Văcărești Prison were recounted by the writer A. de Herz, with whom he shared a cell; according to Herz, the prison was infested with lice that carried the typhus bacteria. As a result of beating and torture by police during his arrest, Frimu's liver and kidneys were heavily damaged, as reportedly indicated by the physician Cristodulo, who was the last to consult him. Under heavy guard, Frimu, in agony, was transported to the hospital, as a large group of socialist detainees, Cristescu included, sang The Internationale. Cristodulo himself contracted typhus and died two weeks after his patient. Thousands of workers took part in Frimu's funeral, asking that those responsible for his death be punished.

Ion G. Duca, who was then in government, wrote that "the police arrested all the [strike] movement's leaders and beat them so severely that one of the most important socialists, Frimu, died a few days later due to the wounds he received".

== Legacy ==
I. C. Frimu was among the last PSDR figures of his age to be respected by both the reformist socialists and their communist adversaries. The moderate Constantin Titel Petrescu praised Frimu as "that admirable human example of honesty, goodness and kindliness". Rakovsky — who had since affiliated with Leninism and had taken refuge in Bolshevist Russia — was himself distressed by the news; in spring 1919, his wife Ileana Pralea wrote to Rozalia Frimu a letter of condolence, in which she said "I am in a position to add that one of my companion's greatest hopes has extinguished with Frimu." As the Socialist Party was split into the moderate groups and the newly formed Romanian Communist Party, Frimu's legacy became the topic of dispute — Moscovici, who sided with the former, claimed that Frimu disapproved of the October Revolution ("[...] Frimu, who had seen the Russian Revolution [for] a year and a half of its activity, never did completely agree with its methods"), and, making reference to the communist activist Alecu Constantinescu, argued that Frimu "could not stand" the latter's "demagogy".

After the Communist regime was established, Frimu gained official status as a hero of the labor movement in Romania, and he was claimed a precursor. His remains were transferred to the Carol Park Mausoleum, designed for prominent socialists and communists, and buried in the semicircle around the monument. The Sinaia Plants were given his name, as were a number of streets in Romania's main cities and a neighborhood in Galați. In 1991, when the mausoleum was deprecated, Frimu's remains were moved to Sfânta Vineri Cemetery, Grivița.
