= Social Democratic Party of Romania (1910–1918) =

Social Democratic Party Partidul Social Democrat
- Abbreviation: PSD
- General Secretary: Dimitrie Marinescu
- Founded: January 31, 1910
- Banned: 1916
- Preceded by: Social Democratic Workers' Party of Romania
- Succeeded by: Socialist Party of Romania
- Newspaper: România Muncitoare
- Ideology: Social democracy Socialism; Marxism; Pacifism; Balkan federalism
- Political position: Left-wing
- International affiliation: Second International

The Social Democratic Party of Romania (Romanian: Partidul Social Democrat din România, or Partidul Social Democrat, PSD) was a Marxist social-democratic political party in Romania. A member of the Second International, the party was active between 1910 and 1916, when it was banned. Clandestine groups continued underground activity until 1918, when the end of World War I allowed the party to re-emerge as a legal political group, renamed as the Socialist Party of Romania.

== History ==
Founded in 1910 at the initiative of the Socialist Union of Romania, a loose alliance of socialist clubs formed across Romania around the magazine România Muncitoare, it also acted as the political wing of the local trade union movement. The party viewed itself as a successor to the Romanian Social Democratic Workers' Party, the latter having disbanded in April 1899 after a conflict between its reformist wing (deemed "generoșii" - "the generous ones"), which left in order to join the National Liberal Party, and the Marxist groups. Appealing to a relatively small working class population, whose political power was further restricted by the income-based voting system, the PSD was unable to attain any major electoral success. Nevertheless, it led an active campaign for better working conditions, land reform and peace.

The party's anti-militarist stance led it to condemn both Romania's participation in the Second Balkan War and, after the start of World War I, the social patriotic stance of Western social-democratic parties. Accordingly, it proposed a federalist solution for the complicated ethnic situation in the Balkans, and, after some internal debates, joined the Zimmerwald movement. Neutral at first, by 1916 Romania's government was increasingly open to participation in the war on the Entente side, and decided to crack down on the socialist movement, brutally repressing a pacifist demonstration in Galați in June. The PSD was banned outright when the country declared war on the Central Powers later that year.

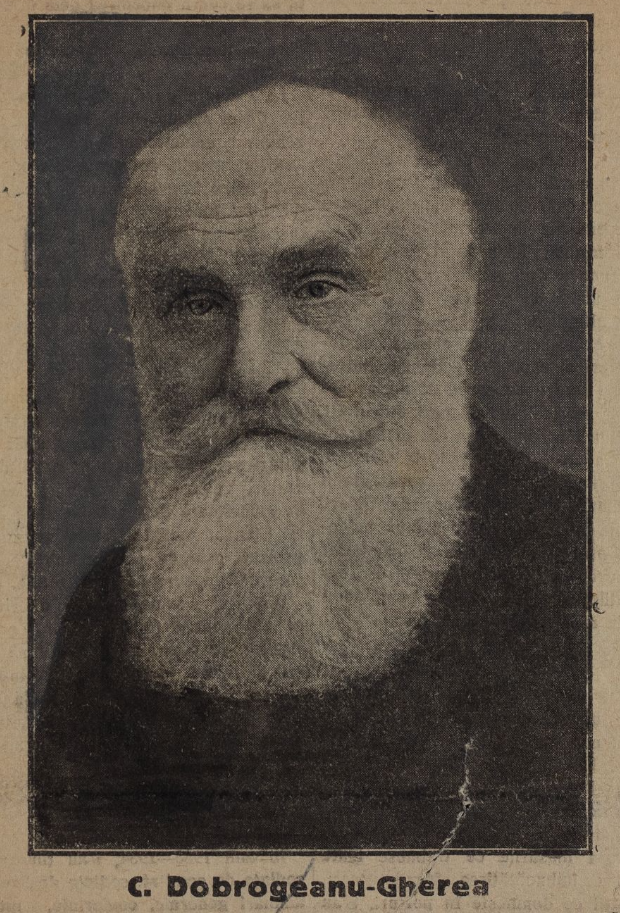
Constantin Dobrogeanu-Gherea in 1915

With a significant part of the members drafted (including the general secretary, Dimitrie Marinescu, killed in action), the party was only able to retain a clandestine activity in the main industrial centres of the country, such as Bucharest, Iași and the Prahova Valley. The PSD's situation further deteriorated after the disastrous Romanian Campaign resulted in the southern half of the country falling under the military occupation of the Central Powers. Paradoxically, the socialists fared somewhat better in the occupied territories, where the occupation army, at the intervention of German social-democrats, gave them some leeway, even allowing the reopening of the Bucharest workers' club.

The 1917 February Revolution led to a reactivation of the Romanian workers' movement, and its subsequent radicalisation. The Bucharest clandestine group, led by Alecu Constantinescu and Gheorghe Cristescu, emerged as the "maximalist" Central committee for anti-war and anti-imperialist action, also coordinating the "intimate councils" active in Ploiești and Câmpina. The radicals in Moldavia, area still under government control, were able to gain the sympathy of the Russian soldiers present in the region as Romania's allies, which provided them with some freedom of action. The Romanian authorities however quickly reacted, imprisoning the socialist leaders Christian Rakovsky and Mihail Gheorghiu Bujor, and assassinating Max Wexler. As a result, most revolutionary socialists fled government persecution to Russia. Establishing their headquarters in Odessa, the main centre of the Romanian refugees in Southern Russia, they created the Romanian Social-Democratic Action Committee under the leadership of Bujor, Alexandru Nicolau and Ion Dic-Dicescu, and re-established the official party press by publishing Lupta.

Soon after the October Revolution, the Odessa committee rallied behind the Bolsheviks. The Bucharest committee also saluted the Revolution and condemned the humiliating peace between Romania and the Central Powers, leading the Germans to reverse their earlier policies and imprison all pre-war socialist leadership in May 1918. Nevertheless, the changing tide of war resulted in a weakening of the German grip on the region, allowing for the re-emergence of the trade unions in the occupied territories beginning with late spring. In the meantime, in April 1918, the moderate social-democrats remaining in Iași, led by Litman Ghelerter and Ion Sion, also regrouped the local party sections into the Moldavia Regional Committee. Faced with pressure from the increasingly radical working class, the government was forced to allow the Committee to function semi-legally. The armistice between Germany and the Allies in November 1918 finally allowed the PSD to emerge from clandestine activity. On November 28, the Bucharest group, headed by Ilie Moscovici and Cristescu, organised a provisional executive committee, including both radicals and moderates, began publishing Socialismul as the official party journal, and succeeded, in relatively short time, in re-opening party sections in the Prahova Valley and the port towns on the Danube. Soon afterwards, the party decided to break with what it saw as the failure of the Second International by rebranding itself as the Socialist Party of Romania.

== Notable members ==
- Vasile Anagnoste
- Ecaterina Arbore
- Mihai Gheorghiu Bujor
- Alecu Constantinescu
- Gheorghe Cristescu
- Toma Dragu
- I. C. Frimu
- Leon Ghelerter
- Ştefan Gheorghiu
- Theodor Iordăchescu
- Barbu Lăzăreanu
- Dimitrie Marinescu
- Ioan I. Mirescu
- Ilie Moscovici
- Alexandru Nicolau
- Ottoi Călin
- Ion Pas
- Ana Pauker
- Constantin Titel Petrescu
- Christian Rakovsky
- Camil Ressu
- Max Vexler
- Şerban Voinea

== Electoral history ==
=== Legislative elections ===
Election	Votes	%	Assembly	Senate	Position
1911			0 / 183	0 / 112	
