= 1918 Romanian typographers' strike =

Labor strike in Bucharest, Romania

The 1918 Romanian typographers' strike was a labor strike in Bucharest, Romania. The strike began on December 6, 1918, when the city's typographers went on strike for higher salaries, an 8-hour work day, and recognition of their union. The striking workers declared a second protest the following week, and on December 13, they were joined by various left-wing groups, who demanded the abolition of the Romanian monarchy. It is estimated that over 15,000 participated in the December 13th demonstrations. The strike was violently put down by the Romanian military, resulting in the deaths and injuries of dozens of workers, although the death toll has been disputed.

== Context ==
Following the end of World War I and the Bolshevik Revolution in the Soviet Union, much of Europe saw various communist uprisings. Over 700,000 Romanian soldiers and civilians were killed during the war.

Compounding this, working conditions amongst the urban population were poor at the time, with children as young as six working, and workdays lasting from 12 to 16 hours per day. Previous protests during World War I were violently suppressed via emergency powers granted to the government. Increasingly, left-wing groups began making themselves more visible, with typographers printing large amounts of left-wing material.

When Ferdinand I returned from exile on December 1, 1918, 6,000 railway workers went on strike in Bucharest. On December 3, 5,000 civil servants went on strike.

== Events ==
On December 6, 1918, typographers in the city on Bucharest had gone on strike, demanding higher salaries, an 8-hour work day, and recognition of their union. During this strike, the protestors announced a second protest the following Friday. On the 13th, protestors marched down Calea Victoriei, near the royal palace. The protestors then approached a military general, asking for permission to protest, which the military did not approve. The military then began shooting the protestors with four machine guns. One military official at the time noted that such shootings went against regulations placed upon the military, which required a military prosecutor to be present to approve such shooting, and that the guidance stated that warning shots should have been fired instead.

== Aftermath and death toll ==
Initially, the government reported a low death tolls, with figures ranging from 6 to 16 strikers that had been killed, although subsequent figures suggest that perhaps 87 or 102 strikes may have been killed.

Socialist organizer Ion Frimu was among those wounded by the military officers, and died from his wounds weeks later. Other prominent figures who were arrested at the march included Alecu Constantinescu and Alexandru Bogdan. Constantin Titel Petrescu and N. D. Cocea were some of the lawyers who defended those arrested.

== Legacy ==
Under the Socialist Republic of Romania, December 13 became a national holiday, known as "Typographers' Day".

A large mausoleum for Ion Frimu was erected in Tineretului Park, and a commemorative statue and plaque was built at the site of the protest. One of the streets the protestors marched down, Ion Câmpineanu Street (Romanian: Strada Ion Câmpineanu) was renamed to December 13, 1918 Street (Romanian: Strada 13 Decembrie 1918), but reverted to Ion Câmpineanu Street following the fall of the Socialist Republic of Romania.
