= Alecu Constantinescu =

Romanian trade unionist, journalist and socialist and pacifist militant (1872–1949)

Alexandru Constantinescu
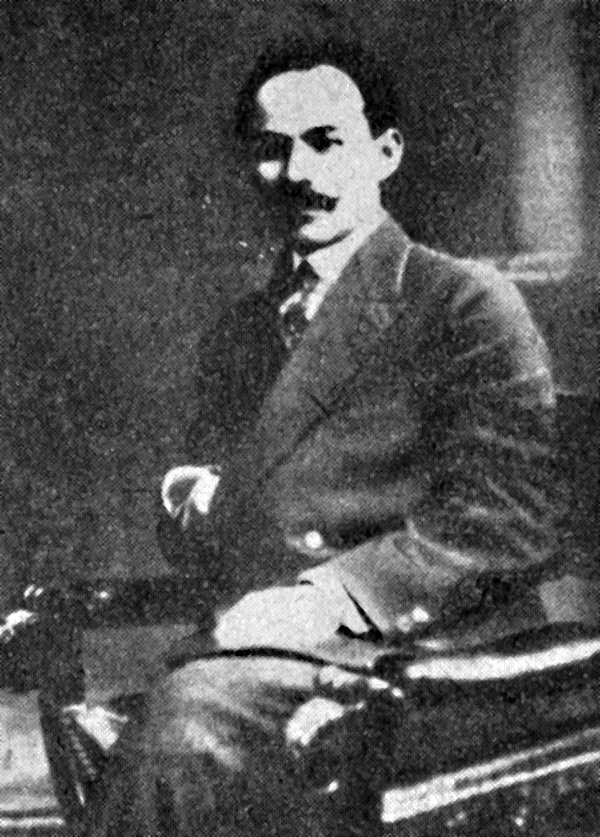
- Constantinescu shortly before World War I
- Born: March 10, 1872; Bucharest, Romania
- Died: March 28, 1949 (aged 76); Bucharest, Romania

Alexandru "Alecu" Constantinescu (March 10, 1872 – March 28, 1949) was a Romanian trade unionist, journalist and socialist and pacifist militant, one of the major advocates of the transformation of the Romanian socialist movement into a communist one.

== Early life ==
Constantinescu was born in Bucharest, Romania's capital, in the family of tailor Ion Constantinescu. He enrolled in high school, however, due to financial problems he was forced to abandon it and work as an apprentice in an upholstery workshops. During this period, he became acquainted with socialist ideas through the works of the early Romanian socialists Constantin Dobrogeanu Gherea, Anton Bacalbaşa and Constantin Mille. In the 1890s, he founded one of the earliest Romanian trade unions, the Professional Association of Upholsterers, and later joined the Romanian Social Democratic Workers' Party (PSDMR). However he soon grew disillusioned with the party leadership, and began attacking it for what he considered to be political and ideological inconsistency. The party itself was dissolved in 1899, when a large part of the leadership joined the National Liberal Party.

== Involvement in socialism ==
Alecu Constantinescu continued to collaborate with some former PSDMR members who remained dedicated to the workers' cause, such as I. C. Frimu, Alexandru Ionescu, Ştefan Gheorghiu, and Mihail Gheorghiu Bujor. At the end 1902 he departed for Paris, France, however he kept contacts with Romanian workers' movement, occasionally sending articles for the socialist newspaper 1 Mai ("May Day"). Returning to Romania in 1904, he worked along Frimu and Bujor towards the reorganisation of the Romanian trade unionism. In August 1906, the Conference of trade unions and socialist circles elected Constantinescu secretary of the General commission of the trade unions, the first Romanian general labour organisation. In the same period he joined the editorial board of România Muncitoare, becoming its executive editor. The newspaper was the main socialist venue of the time, and helped organise several strikes. Alecu Constantinescu himself began in 1906 a tour of Romanian cities, helping organise the local workers, in the hope of creating an unified national trade union. In 1907, during the Romanian Peasants' Revolt he was in Paşcani, in Moldavia, one of the centres of the rebellion. Due to his activism among the local workers in support of the peasants he was imprisoned for lèse majesté, however the Fălticeni court cleared him of charges few weeks later.

In late June he participated in the second Conference of trade unions and socialist circles that took place in Galaţi, and in August he was part of the Romanian delegation to the Stuttgart Congress of the Second International, along Christian Rakovsky, N. D. Cocea and Andrei Ionescu. Around this time he also became the editor of the trade union section of România Muncitoare. Between 1906 and 1910 he organised Cercul Amicilor ("The circle of friends"), an association that offered political education and guidance for the trade union leaders from Bucharest and the other Romanian cities. In 1908, with the help of other socialist militants, Alecu Constantinescu also founded a youth wing, Cercul ucenicilor ("The circle of apprentices"), whose goal was to train young workers for the leadership of the socialist movement. When the socialist party was refounded in 1910 as the Social Democratic Party of Romania (PSDR), Constantinescu, Frimu, Dumitru Marinescu and Bujor were elected in its executive committee. In the subsequent years Alecu Constantinescu participated in various workers' actions supported by the party.

== World War I ==
Following the start of World War I, Alecu Constantinescu supported the neutrality of Romania and joined the pacifist movement. He led the proceedings of the August 1914 extraordinary Congress of the PSDR that adopted a strong anti-war declaration, and participated in the July 1915 Bucharest Inter-Balkan Socialist Conference that adopted a similar position. Constantinescu and the PSDR also supported the resolutions of the Zimmerwald Conference. In August 1916, after Romania joined the war on the side of the Entente, he was the founder and leader of a Central Committee for anti-war and anti-imperialist action. The attitude of the party led the Romanian authorities to outlaw it. As Romania was rapidly overrun by the forces of the Central Powers during the autumn on 1916, the Romanian government and an important part of the Romanian elite took refuge in Iași, in eastern Romania. Constantinescu chose to stay in German-occupied Bucharest, where he attempted to reorganise the socialist movement. He succeeded in creating a clandestine "maximalist faction", favourable to the Bolsheviks, and continued to spread anti-war propaganda. In 1917 Constantinescu and Frimu attended the Socialist Conference in Stockholm, and afterwards Constantinescu left for the newly-Soviet Russia, while Frimu returned to Romania.

Constantinescu returned to Romania in November 1918 and was one of the main organisers of the Romanian typographers' strike of December 26 [O.S. December 13], which was brutally suppressed by the Romanian government. He escaped capture, but nevertheless the Court Martial of the Second Army Corps sentenced him to death in absentia, and he was thus forced into hiding. During this period he actively militated for the transformation of the Socialist Party of Romania into a communist party. Constantinescu was eventually captured in the summer of 1920, and was imprisoned in the fort of Jilava. In December 1920 he made a successful bid for escape, along Constantin Agiu and other communist militants. As a 20,000 lei reward was put on his head, he was forced to leave for Bulgaria in early 1921, eventually making his way to Soviet Russia. In Moscow he taught Romanian and French language at the Western Section of the Communist University. He was also part of the Romanian delegation to the Third Congress of the Comintern in the summer of 1921. While he was in Russia, another Romanian court sentenced him to death in absentia, as part of the Dealul Spirii Trial.

In 1923, Constantinescu left Soviet Russia for France, where he stayed until 1935. There he joined the Association of the Romanian Communists in France and occasionally sent articles to be published in the Romanian press. However he lost to a large degree contact with the communist leadership in Romania. In 1935 he returned to the Soviet Union, and in 1937 he was back Romania. He was quickly apprehended and sent for trial before the War Council of the Second Army Corps. The court found that prescription had intervened, and decided to set him free on February 6, 1938.

== World War II ==
In 1940, when German-supported general Ion Antonescu and the fascist Iron Guard gained the power in Romania, Constantinescu, as most communist leaders in Romania, was interned in a concentration camp. During World War II he was successively interned at Miercurea Ciuc, Caracal and Târgu Jiu. Set free after Romania changed sides and joined the Allies in August 1944, he worked for the Bucharest section of the Romanian Communist Party. In 1948 he was a delegate at the congress that decided the unification of the Romanian Communist and Social-Democratic parties into the Romanian Workers' Party. He died in Bucharest in 1949.

== See also ==
- List of peace activists
