= Ștefan Gheorghiu (trade unionist) =

Romanian politician

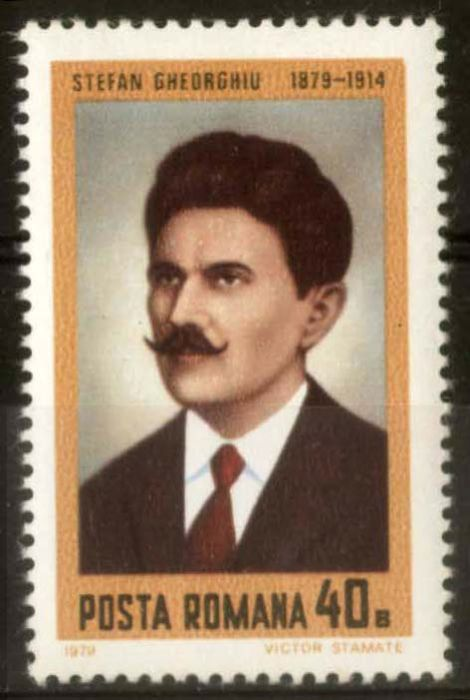
Ștefan Gheorghiu

Ștefan Gheorghiu (15 January 1879 – 19 March 1914) was a Romanian trade unionist and anarchist. Born to Năstase, a carpenter in Ploiești, he entered the socialist movement and became a member of his native city's Workers' Club. After the leaders of the Romanian Social-Democratic Workers' Party entered the National Liberal Party in 1899, he struggled to reorganise the workers' movement. In 1903 he went by foot to Bucharest to participate in a workers' protest in the Cișmigiu Gardens. He played an important role in setting up trade unions and was one of the promoters of the General Conference of Trade Unions in 1906.

During the 1907 Romanian Peasants' Revolt, he was an outspoken defender of the peasants; arrested as an instigator of opposition, he was detained at prisons in Ploiești and Galați. Upon release, he went to Brăila, where he met Panait Istrati. Gheorghiu was a member and leader of the "Working Romania" Socialist Circles and one of the founders of the Social Democratic Party in 1910. He protested against Romania's participation in the Second Balkan War and published the manifesto War against War before dying, aged 35, of tuberculosis in Bucharest's Filaret Hospital. He was buried in Ploiești in a civil funeral.

The Ștefan Gheorghiu Academy was named in his honour in 1946.
