= Ion Păun-Pincio =

Romanian poet

Ion Păun-Pincio (born Ion Păun; August 17, 1868–December 31, 1894) was a Romanian poet.

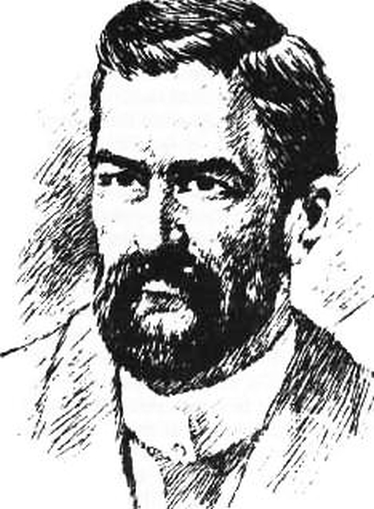
Ion Păun-Pincio

Born in Mihăileni, Botoșani County, his parents were deputy prefect Alexandru Păun and his wife Maria (née Cozmiță). He attended high school in nearby Pomârla and in Iași. Moving to the national capital Bucharest in 1892, he became a day-laboring telegrapher and joined the circle for social studies, a socialist organization. His job took him to Brăila and to rural Neamț County, after which he returned to Bucharest as editor of Lumea nouă socialist newspaper. He worked as a cashier at the Ion Luca Caragiale-owned Bene Bibenti beer hall on Șelari Street.

He made his published debut in Familia in 1888, also writing for Drepturile omului, Contemporanul, Ilustrațiunea română, Adevărul, Vieața, Literatură și știință, Evenimentul literar and Munca științifică și literară. After accompanying Dimitrie Anghel on a trip to Rome, he added "Pincio" to his name. As a poet, his style anticipated Sămănătorism and Poporanism, and he was highly appreciated in socialist circles. In 1948, when it revamped the Romanian Academy, the new communist regime selected him as a post-mortem member.
