= Dimitrie Marinescu =

Romanian typographer, socialist and pacifist (1882–1916)

Dimitrie N. Marinescu
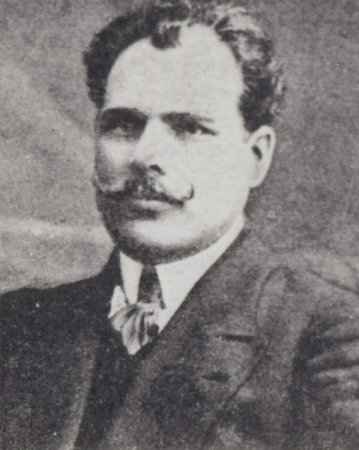
- Born: 1882
- Died: 1916 (aged 33–34)
- Occupations: typographer, politician, and labor activist

Dimitrie N. Marinescu (1882–1916) was a Romanian typographer, socialist and pacifist. He was a founder and General Secretary of the first Social Democratic Party of Romania in 1910.

== Biography ==
Marinescu wrote several books but only two were published. In 1915, he translated and published Wilhelm Lamszus' 1912 book The human slaughterhouse. Images of the coming war. He died in the war the following year at age 34.

A biographical book of Marinescu's life Evocari - Dimitrie Marinescu was written by Constantin Pirvulescu and Georgeta Tudoran. Editura Politica published it in Bucharest in 1971.

A street in Bucharest is named Dimitrie Marinescu in his honour.

== Bibliography ==
Marinescu's books are kept by the Romanian Academy Library:

- 34887. ~ Câte-va cuvinte asupra Socialismului şi Sindicalismului în România, [de] D. N. Marinescu (Lucrător). Cu o prefaţă de Const. Gheorghian. București (Speranţa, Inst. de Arte Grafice), 1911. (21,5 x 13,5). 24 p. 25 bani. (II 27522) Fără copertă.
- 34888. ~ Treizeci zile la Văcăreşti. Fapte şi impressii (Epilogul înscenărei poliţieneşti de la 9 Ocotombrie 1909), [de] D. Marinescu. București, Cercul de Editură Socialistă (Tipografia Cooperativă Poporul), 1910. (16,5 x 12,5). 54 p. 15 bani. (Biblioteca România Muncitoare, nr. 25) (I 21632) Tipografia, pe cop. 4.
- 31333. ~ Abatorul de Oameni. Tablouri din războiul viitor, [de] Wihelm Lamszus. Tradus de Dimitrie Marinescu. București (Tip. Soc. Anonime Poporul), 1914. (18,5 x 12). 64 p. (I 42410)
- (Wilhelm Lamszus - Das Menschenschlachthaus. Bilder vom kommenden Krieg (The human slaughterhouse. Images of the coming war) - 1912 - translation to Romanian )
