= Constantin Titel Petrescu =

Romanian politician (1888–1957)

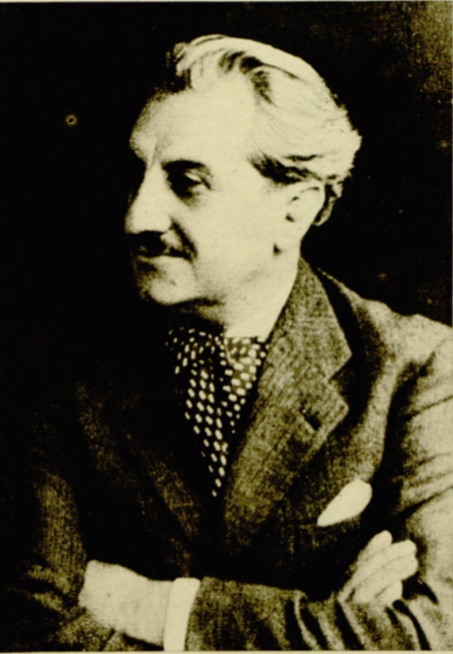

Minister Secretary of State
- In office 23 August 1944 – 3 November 1944
- Prime Minister: Constantin Sănătescu

Personal details
- Born: February 5, 1888 Craiova, Kingdom of Romania
- Died: September 2, 1957 (aged 69) Bucharest, Romanian People's Republic
- Resting place: Bellu Cemetery, Bucharest
- Party: Romanian Social Democratic Party; Independent Social-Democratic Party
- Education: Saint Sava College
- Alma mater: University of Bucharest
- Occupation: Lawyer

Constantin Titel Petrescu (5 February 1888 – 2 September 1957) was a Romanian politician and lawyer. He was the leader of the Romanian Social Democratic Party.

He was born in Craiova, the son of an employee of the National Bank in Bucharest. After completing high school at Saint Sava College in 1903, he studied Philosophy and Law at the University of Bucharest, earning a J.D. degree. After auditing some penal law courses at Sorbonne University in Paris, he returned to Bucharest and registered in 1911 with the Ilfov County Bar as a defense lawyer. He defended before the Ilfov Court socialist militant Alexandru Nicolau, who was eventually acquitted by the jury.

In 1923, Petrescu stood trial for alleged insults addressed to the Romanian Army; with the help of a defense team that included Dem I. Dobrescu, he was acquitted. That same year, he joined Constantin Rădulescu-Motru, Virgil Madgearu, Constantin Costa-Foru, Victor Eftimiu, Grigore Iunian, Radu D. Rosetti, Dem Dobrescu, Nicolae L. Lupu, and Constantin Mille, in creating Liga Drepturilor Omului (the League for Human Rights), protesting against measures taken by the National Liberal cabinet of Ion I. C. Brătianu in dealing with left-wing opposition forces.

Petrescu was actively involved in the preparations for the August 1944 coup d'état organized by King Michael I, which led to the fall of Conducător Marshal Ion Antonescu. He was then appointed Minister Secretary of State without portfolio in the first cabinet of Constantin Sănătescu. After World War II, relations between the Social Democratic Party (PSD) and the Romanian Communist Party (PCR) deteriorated, and Petrescu refused the electoral alliance with the PCR in 1946. Instead, he established his own political movement, the Independent Social-Democratic Party (PSDI), with which he participated in the elections of November 1946.

After the establishment of the communist regime, Petrescu was arrested on 6 May 1948. Detained at Jilava, Sighet, and Râmnicu Sărat prisons, he was liberated after 7 years in December 1955, after the United Kingdom Labour Party had interceded with Nikita Khrushchev. He spent the rest of his life in hospital, suffering from scurvy and tuberculosis, a result of the harsh treatment he endured while in prison. He is buried at Bellu Cemetery, in Bucharest.

Streets in the Ghencea district of Bucharest and in Timișoara are named after him.
