= Social Democratic Workers' Party of Romania =

Romanian political party

Social Democratic Workers' Party of Romania Partidul Social-Democrat al Muncitorilor din Romȃnia
- Abbreviation: PSDMR
- Leader: Ioan Nădejde; Constantin Dobrogeanu-Gherea; Vasile Morțun; I. C. Frimu
- Founded: March 31, 1893
- Dissolved: February 1900
- Merged into: National Liberal Party (faction)
- Succeeded by: Social Democratic Party of Romania
- Ideology: Socialism; Marxism
- Political position: Left-wing
- International affiliation: Second International

The Social Democratic Workers' Party of Romania (Romanian: Partidul Social-Democrat al Muncitorilor din Romȃnia, PSDMR), established in 1893, was the first modern socialist political party in Romania. A Marxist organization, the PSDMR was part of the Second International and sent its representatives to the first five congresses of that organization. Never a strong organization, the PSDMR was further weakened following an organizational split in February 1900. In February 1910 the former members of PSDMR joined a new organization, the Romanian Social Democratic Party (PSDR).

== Background ==
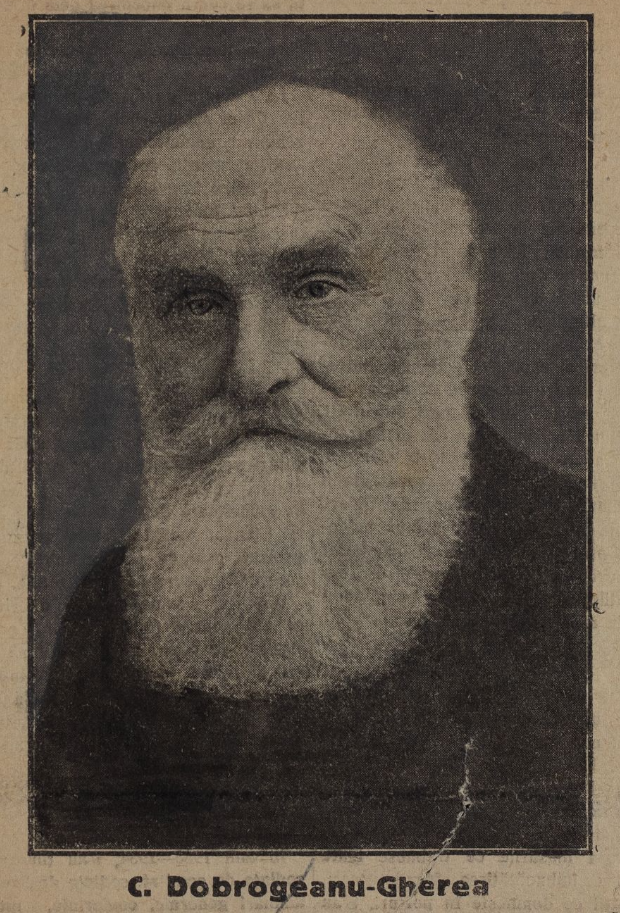
Constantin Dobrogeanu-Gherea in 1915

The history of socialism in Romania begins in 1834, when an aristocrat named Teodor Diamant (1810–1841) established a utopian socialist colony based on the ideas of French writer Charles Fourier in the town of Scăieni, located north of Bucharest. This experiment in agricultural communitarianism was terminated in 1836.

During the decade of the 1870s, socialist ideas again began to gain attention in Romania, particularly among certain university students in Bucharest. Constantin Dobrogeanu-Gherea (1855–1920) is the best remembered among these early advocates of Marxist ideas in Romania.

== Establishment ==
In 1893 the PSDMR was established in an effort to unite various radical individuals in a unitary political organization.

The PSDMR was particularly strong in the city of Bucharest and it grew to about 6,000 members by 1897.

== Split ==
In February 1900 the PSDMR split between a reformist wing that sought to unite all pro-democracy forces, socialist and non-socialist, in a single political party and a radical wing that sought to continue the political fight not just for political democracy but also for the cause of socialist economy. The reform wing was absorbed into the ranks of the National Liberal Party and continued their political efforts in that organization.

After about five years of a weak underground existence, the radical wing of the PSDMR reemerged as the Socialist Union of Romania (Uniunea Socialistă din România), working closely with the emerging trade union movement in Bucharest.

== New organization ==
In February 1910 the Socialist Union of Romania determined to establish a new national political organization known as the Romanian Social Democratic Party (PSDR) and dissolved itself to join the ranks of that new organization.
