= România Muncitoare =

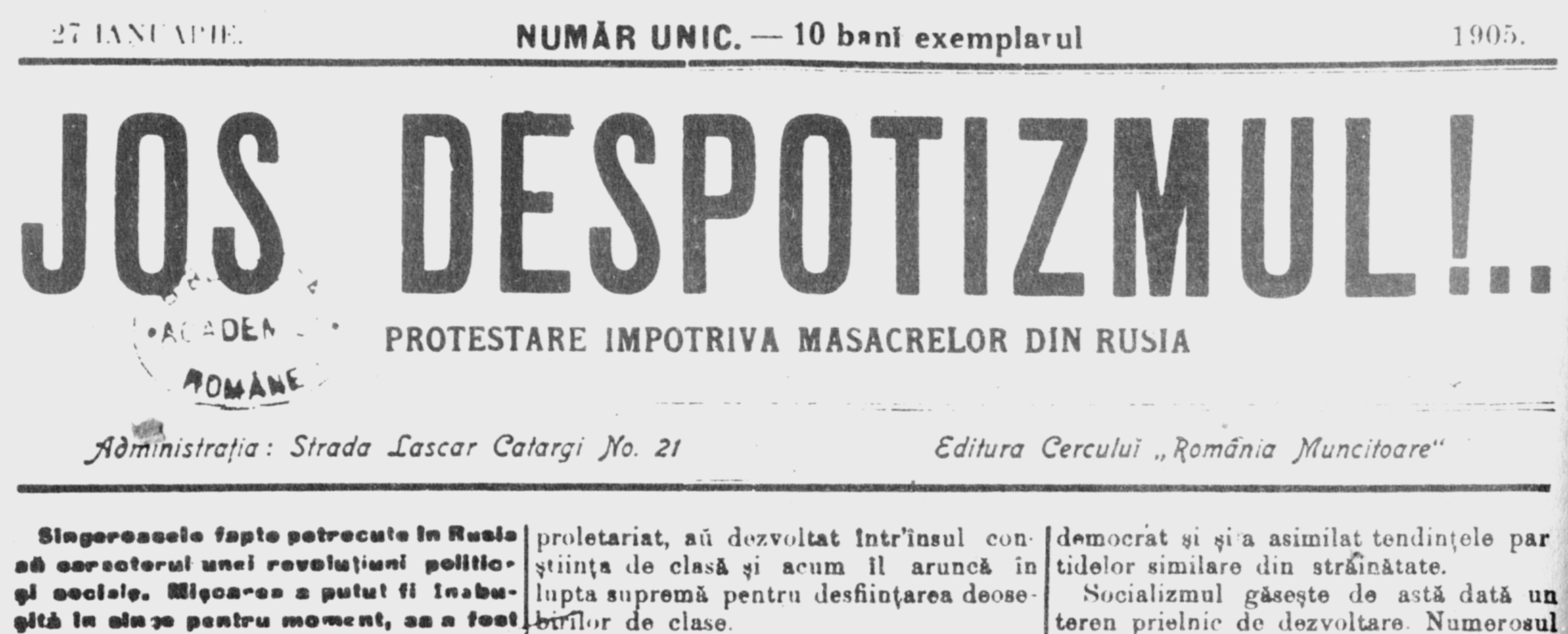
Front page of Jos Despotizmul!.. ("Down with Despotism!"), a special issue of România Muncitoare, entirely dedicated to criticism of the Imperial Russian authorities (February 1905)

România Muncitoare ("Working Romania" or "Laborer Romania") was a socialist newspaper, published in Bucharest, Romania. It was revived by Partidul Muncitorilor in 1905.
