= List of Romanian communists =

The following is a list of Romanian communists, including both activists of the Romanian Communist Party (PCR) and people actively engaged in other communist groups (including people of Romanian origin who were members of communist parties in other countries).

== General Secretaries of the PCR ==
Name	Years
Gheorghe Cristescu	1921–1924
Elek Köblös	1924–1927
Vitali Holostenco	1927–1931
Alexander Stefanski	1931–1936
Boris Stefanov	1936–1940
Ștefan Foriș	1940–1944
Gheorghe Gheorghiu-Dej	1945–1954
Gheorghe Apostol	1954–1955
Gheorghe Gheorghiu-Dej	1955–1965
Nicolae Ceaușescu	1965–1989

== Activists of the PCR ==
- Constantin Agiu
- Ștefan Andrei
- Ecaterina Arbore
- Olga Bancic
- Maria Banuș
- Aurel Baranga
- Eugen Barbu
- Alexandru Bârlădeanu
- Mihai Beniuc
- Emil Bobu
- Francisc Boczor
- Emil Bodnăraș
- Petre Borilă
- G. Brătescu
- Béla Breiner
- Silviu Brucan
- Simion Bughici
- Teodor Bugnariu
- Avram Bunaciu
- Cornel Burtică
- Scarlat Callimachi
- Emil Calmanovici
- Ion Călugăru
- Elena Ceaușescu
- Ilie Ceaușescu
- Marin Ceaușescu
- Nicu Ceaușescu
- Dumitru Cernicica
- Iosif Chișinevschi
- Mihai Chițac
- Vladimir Colin
- Dumitru Coliu
- Teodor Coman
- Alecu Constantinescu
- Miron Constantinescu
- Petre Constantinescu-Iași
- Radu Cosașu
- Constanța Crăciun
- Nicolae Cristea
- Ovid Crohmălniceanu
- Mihail Cruceanu
- Constantin Dăscălescu
- Constantin David
- Ion Dincă
- Alexandru Dobrogeanu-Gherea
- Nicolae Doicaru
- Constantin Doncea
- Alexandru Drăghici
- Petru Dumitriu
- David Fabian
- János Fazekas
- Elena Filipescu
- Leonte Filipescu
- Suzana Gâdea
- Justin Georgescu
- Paul Georgescu
- Teohari Georgescu
- Petre Gheorghe
- Nicolae Goldberger
- Dumitru Grofu
- Boris Holban
- George Homoștean
- Alexandru Iacob
- Nestor Ignat
- Aladar Imre
- Alexandru Iliescu
- Ion Iliescu
- Constantin Ionescu Gulian
- Iorgu Iordan
- George Ivașcu
- Alexandru Jar
- Ionel Jora
- Béla Jósza
- Mozes Kahana
- Remus Koffler
- Hillel Kohn
- David Korner
- Mihail Levente
- Leon Lichtblau
- Haia Lifșiț
- Elisabeta Luca
- Gherasim Luca
- Vasile Luca
- Mihail Macavei
- George Macovescu
- Mihai Magheru
- Corneliu Mănescu
- Manea Mănescu
- Șmil Marcovici
- Gheorghe Gaston Marin
- Timotei Marin
- Gheorghe Maurer
- Vasile Milea
- Alexandru Moghioroș
- Nicolae Moraru
- Ghiță Moscu
- Nicolae Militaru
- Costin Murgescu
- Alexandru Nicolski
- Vanda Nicolski
- Paul Niculescu-Mizil
- Ion Niculi
- Mihail Novicov
- Cornel Onescu
- Saul Ozias
- Octavian Paler
- Francisc Panet
- Petre Pandrea
- Miron Radu Paraschivescu
- Ion Pas
- Vasile Patilineț
- Ana Pauker
- Marcel Pauker
- Lucrețiu Pătrășcanu
- Paul Păun
- Adrian Păunescu
- Ilie Pintilie
- Constantin Pîrvulescu
- Ștefan Plavăț
- Nicolae Pleșiță
- Dumitru Radu Popescu
- Nicolae Popescu-Doreanu
- Ion Popescu-Puțuri
- Mihai Popilian
- Tudor Postelnicu
- Grigore Preoteasa
- Grigore Răceanu
- Lothar Rădăceanu
- Gogu Rădulescu
- Iosif Rangheț
- Leonte Răutu
- Vasile Roaită
- Stephan Roll
- Mihail Roller
- Valter Roman
- Eugen Rozvan
- Alexandru Sahia
- Leontin Sălăjan
- Filimon Sârbu
- Alexandru Sencovici
- Alexandra Sidorovici
- Matei Socor
- Ion Stănescu
- Pavel Ștefan
- Pompiliu Ștefu
- Chivu Stoica
- Gheorghe Stoica
- Pavel Tcacenko
- Virgil Teodorescu
- Solomon Tinkelman
- Leonte Tismăneanu
- Alexandru Toma
- Sorin Toma
- Ioan Totu
- Virgil Trofin
- Dolfi Trost
- Eugen Țurcanu
- Ilie Văduva
- Vasile Vaida
- Gheorghe Vasilescu-Vasia
- Gheorghe Vasilichi
- Ghizela Vass
- Ilie Verdeț
- Gheza Vida
- Ion Vincze
- Ion Vitner
- Iulian Vlad
- Ștefan Voitec
- Richard Wurmbrand
- Belu Zilber
- Ana Toma

== Romanian communists not affiliated with the PCR ==
- Martin Abern
- Haig Acterian
- Octav Băncilă
- Geo Bogza
- Mihai Gheorghiu Bujor
- Ilie Cătărău
- N. D. Cocea
- Ion Dic Dicescu
- Constantin M. Gălbeoru
- Leon Ghelerter
- Max Goldstein
- Traian Herseni
- Panait Istrati
- Samuil Lehtțir
- Rodion Markovits
- Alexandru Nicolau
- Mihail Polihroniade
- Constantin Popovici
- Christian Rakovsky
- Alexandru Robot
- Filimon Săteanu
- Wilhelm Stepper-Tristis
- Tristan Tzara
- Gheorghe I. Ungureanu

== See also ==
- Amicii URSS
- Romanian Society for Friendship with the Soviet Union
- List of communists imprisoned by the Kingdom of Romania
