= Vasile Luca =

Austro-Hungarian-born Romanian-Soviet politician (1898–1963)

- László Luka
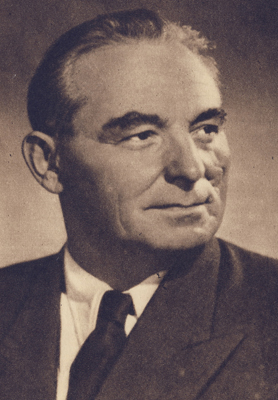

Minister of Finance
- In office 7 November 1947 – 9 March 1952
- Prime Minister: Petru Groza
- Preceded by: Alexandru Alexandrini
- Succeeded by: Dumitru Petrescu

Personal details
- Born: 8 June 1898 Szentkatolna, Austria-Hungary
- Died: 23 July 1963 (aged 65) Aiud Prison, Cluj Region, Romanian People's Republic
- Party: Romanian Communist Party
- Spouse: Elisabeta Luca

Vasile Luca (born László Luka; 8 June 1898 – 23 July 1963) was an Austro-Hungarian-born Romanian and Soviet communist politician, a leading member of the Romanian Communist Party (PCR) from 1945 and until his imprisonment in the 1950s. Noted for his activities in the Ukrainian SSR in 1940–1941, he sided with Ana Pauker during World War II, and returned to Romania to serve as the minister of finance and one of the most recognizable leaders of the Communist regime. Luca's downfall, coming at the end of a conflict with Gheorghe Gheorghiu-Dej, signaled that of Pauker.

He was married to Elisabeta Luca (née Betty Birman), a volunteer in the International Brigades during the Spanish Civil War, who was also imprisoned following her husband's arrest.

== Biography ==
=== Early activities ===
A native of Szentkatolna, Transylvania, Austria-Hungary (today part of Catalina, Covasna County, Romania). Luca was an ethnic Hungarian from the Székely community, of "proletarian" origin. He was sometimes erroneously identified as Jewish by some Romanian historians and journalists, or as a Transylvanian German.

His father died at the age of 26, forcing his mother to give him to an orphanage in Sibiu. He remained there until the age of 13, completing six primary grades, and then became a locksmith's apprentice. At the beginning of 1915, he was employed at the Brașov railway station, but in October of the same year he was recruited into the Austro-Hungarian Army and sent to fight in World War I. In the period following the Aster Revolution, as Transylvania's administration was taken over by Romania as a result of the Hungarian–Romanian War, he joined Károly Kratochwill's non-communist Székely Division (formed inside Hungary by Hungarian Transylvanian refugees), which tried to oppose the Romanian military. After the Romanian Army crushed the Hungarian Soviet Republic, Luca moved to Brașov and began working for the Romanian Railways (CFR), attempting to align railworkers' trade union with the Profintern. Luca later admitted that, in Leninist terms, he had been mistaken to leave the Division — after allegedly being persuaded to do so by a group of workers in Satu Mare — as he had missed an opportunity to carry out "revolutionary work under party directives", although he confessed that he had been denied membership in the Hungarian Communist Party.

He soon adhered to the larger maximalist wing of the former Socialist Party of Romania, which had established the Romanian Communist Party, and became an associate of Imre Aladar. In 1924, as the party was outlawed and forced into the underground, Luca was elected secretary of the Brașov regional committee. Participating in the preparations for the 1929 Lupeni Strike in the Jiu Valley, he was also elected, together with Alexandru Nicolschi, to the internal Politburo – one of the two bodies established by the Comintern at the time, the other one supervising from inside the Soviet Union. In conflicts inside the party, he was punished by the Comintern overseers and the Stalinist leadership, being recalled from his party functions and later on required to display a dose of self-criticism.

=== Prison and exile ===
Arrested in 1924, 1933, and 1938, and sentenced to prison terms; notably, Luca was successfully defended by attorneys paid for with Red Aid funds during a 1927 trial in Cluj (where Boris Stefanov was sentenced), and was represented by Ion Gheorghe Maurer during his 1938 trial. He was serving time in Cernăuți, having been found guilty of attempt to cross the border between the Kingdom of Romania and the Ukrainian SSR, when the Soviet Union annexed Northern Bukovina (see Soviet occupation of Bessarabia and Northern Bukovina).

Luca reoriented himself in the aftermath of the Great Purge (having already renounced the friendship with Purge victim Aladar, as well as those of Vitali Holostenco, Eugen Rozvan, and Elek Köblös). He took up Soviet citizenship, became deputy mayor of Chernivtsi, and a deputy in the Soviet of Nationalities of the Ukrainian SSR. The Trotskyist journal the New International accused Luca of having participated in a supposed deportation of almost 30,000 citizens from Northern Bukovina to the Asiatic republics of the Soviet Union. On 26 March 1941, in Storozhynets, he gave a speech in front of a mass of people who were protesting the Soviet administration, calling them "spies, enemies, and diversionists"; the crowd responded with heckling. On 1 April, a large number of people from nearby villages were killed while attempting to cross the border from the Soviet Union to Romania in Fântâna Albă (now Bila Krynytsya, Ukraine) — see Fântâna Albă massacre.

After the start of Operation Barbarossa, he was instrumental in the creation of a Romanian language section for Radio Moscow, broadcasting propaganda against the Ion Antonescu regime and its German allies (see Romania during World War II). At the time, he began his collaboration with Ana Pauker, who led the main cell of the PCR's "exterior wing", created by those who had taken refuge inside the Soviet Union. He enlisted in the Red Army, helped recruit Romanian prisoners of war to form the Tudor Vladimirescu Division, and then returned to Romania with the Soviet troops in late 1944 (see Soviet occupation of Romania). Luca later stated that he had been disappointed in the fact that local forces under King Mihai I had taken the initiative in ousting Antonescu and aligning the country with the Allies, arguing that the PCR was supposed to await the Soviets' presence.

=== Political leadership ===
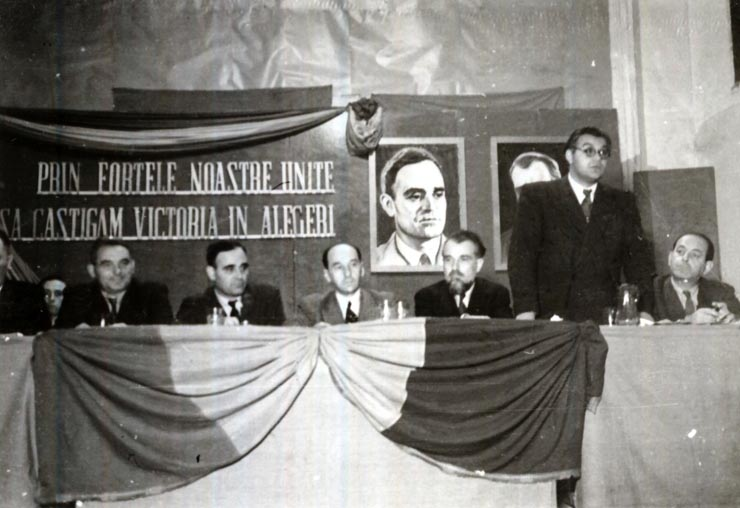
Official tribune at the PCR–PSDR summit at Paris Cinema, October 23, 1946. Miron Constantinescu is speaking; also pictured: Ștefan Voitec, Gheorghe Gheorghiu-Dej, and Luca

One year later, he became party secretary, and soon after the finance minister and the deputy premier in the Petru Groza cabinet which he had helped bring to power in February 1945 (with Pauker, he ensured the Allied Commission's support for Communists who were protesting against the Nicolae Rădescu executive). Luca became involved in all major conflicts between the PCR and the traditional opposition forces, the National Peasants' Party and the National Liberal Party: he gave inflammatory speeches on the issue of Northern Transylvania's return to Romania (journalist Victor Frunză later claimed Luca recommended its postponing), on projects regarding the establishment of a dictatorship of the proletariat, as well as on collectivization.

At the Party Conference in October, when the balance set after General Secretary Ștefan Foriș' downfall came to be questioned, Luca made his voice heard in opposition to Gheorghe Gheorghiu-Dej's "internal wing", and proposed that the latter be kept as nominal leader (with Pauker taking over the party executive); Gheorghiu-Dej, who managed to obtain Joseph Stalin's approval through the intervention of Emil Bodnăraș, became focused on maneuvering against the rival faction.

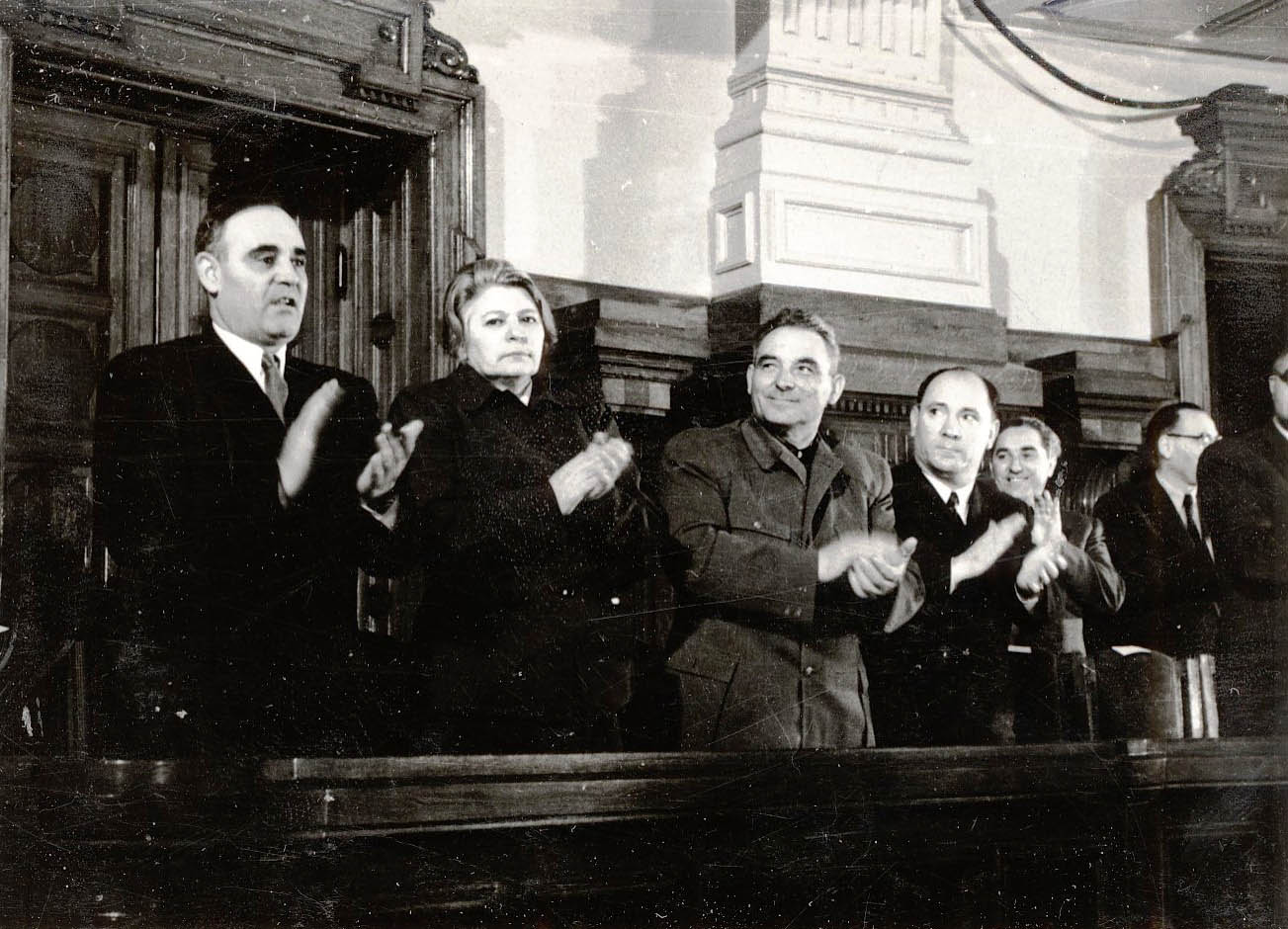
Gheorghe Gheorghiu-Dej, Ana Pauker, Luca, and Teohari Georgescu at the Great National Assembly in April 1951

In late 1945, the issue of collectivization brought Luca into a brief and intense conflict with the Ploughmen's Front (a group led by Petru Groza and allied with the Communists), which threatened to cease supporting the PCR if private property was not going to be guaranteed. His plans for rapid communization also rose opposition inside the party — Lucrețiu Pătrășcanu is known to have advised against them.

With those of Pauker, Teohari Georgescu, and Gheorghiu-Dej, his name was one of the most prominent in propaganda, including the famous collective slogan Ana, Luca, Teo, Dej / Bagă spaima în burgheji — "Ana, Luca, Teo[hari], Dej / Scare the bourgeois". The group of leaders was active in suppression of various inner-party political factions, starting with that of Foriș, and continued with those of Remus Koffler and Pătrășcanu.

He directed the forced transition to collective farming, and kept his ministerial office after the proclamation of the People's Republic. Inside the Secretariat, he, Pauker and Georgescu eventually became the main obstacle in the way of Gheorghiu-Dej's policies. An article published in 1948 in the Trotskyist journal New International described Luca as the "most sectarian member of the Stalinist ruling gang".

=== Downfall ===
While Luca had supported the rise of Gheorghiu-Dej during the Grivița strike of 1933, his temper caused frictions with the new leader. He was quite open about his opposition to the Danube-Black Sea Canal—a pet project of Dej, apparently recommended by Joseph Stalin himself. On the initiative of General Secretary Gheorghiu-Dej, who sought and obtained Stalin's approval for purging the leadership in January 1952 (Dej had traveled personally to Moscow for that purpose; Vyacheslav Molotov intervened on behalf of Pauker, whereas Lavrentiy Beria defended Georgescu) Luca was dismissed from government office in March, and purged from the party in May (formally, in August 1953), together with Pauker.

Officially, the purge was centered on accusations regarding Luca's opposition to the monetary reform of the Romanian leu, a measure ordered by the Soviet Union and carried out on 28 January 1952. He had been charged, through the voice of Miron Constantinescu, with "grave deviations" and taking a "right wing opportunistic line, breaking away from the working classes" (see Right Opposition); in addition to sharing the blame, Pauker was accused of having taken a "left wing opportunistic line" (see Left Opposition) on various issues. Upon witnessing the attack on him during the Plenary meeting of May (immediately amplified by the interventions of Alexandru Moghioroș, Iosif Rangheț, Ion Vincze and others), Luca fainted. He was arrested in the same month, some days after his deposition and political indictment.

Luca's interrogation, approved and supervised by Soviet advisors, also involved aspects of his past: it was alleged that, as a youth, he had taken part in conflicts opposing the Székely Division and the communists on the side of the former, that he had been recruited by the Romanian secret police (Siguranța Statului) in the early 1920s and had thus infiltrated the PCR, and that he had been paid to encourage fighting inside the party.

In October 1954, he was sentenced to death for economic sabotage, but, after appealing to the PCR leaders, he had his sentence commuted to life imprisonment and hard labour, and died 9 years later in detention at Aiud Prison, having been kept in almost complete isolation. After his imprisonment, he wrote several letters to Gheorghiu-Dej, in which he continued to plead his innocence; it is not known if the addressee ever replied to Luca personally, but he would usually add derogatory comments to the margin of each letter. In one of those letters (dated April 20, 1956), Luca argued against his conviction for economic sabotage, saying that all the decisions he took were under the guidance and supervision of the Soviet counsellor at the ministry, and the legislation that he had worked on had been approved by the PCR (including Gheorghiu-Dej himself). Twenty-nine of Luca's present and former collaborators — from the Finance Ministry employees and from Centrocoop — were also arrested at the time. They were all subjected to torture. Alexandru Iacob, the deputy finance minister, received 20 years of forced labor; Ivan Solymos, vice-president of Centrocoop, was sentenced to 15, while Dumitru Cernicica, the Centrocoop first vice-president, was condemned to 3 years of corrective jail. For a while Luca and Iacob were detained at Râmnicu Sărat Prison.

In 1952, charges against Luca implicated Teohari Georgescu, who was accused of împăciuitorism ("appeasing attitude") and admitted to "not having seen the gravity of Luca's deeds" in a futile effort to save himself from incarceration. Pauker herself claimed that she had suspected Luca of attempting to topple Gheorghiu-Dej, and argued that her Jewish origins and Luca's Hungarian roots had made them the target of Soviet suspicion (she recalled having been told so by Andrey Vyshinsky), as well as unpopular inside Romania.

The entire writings of Luca, Pauker, and Georgescu were removed from their places in officially sanctioned libraries, and quotes from them were systematically deleted from reference works.

== Rehabilitation ==
In September 1965, just two years after his death and six months after the death of Gheorghiu-Dej, the change in tone signaled by Nicolae Ceaușescu, the new general secretary, led to the re-evaluation of Luca's case by a party commission that included Ion Popescu-Puțuri.

The investigation revealed major irregularities and a pattern of abusive measures, including the direct implication of Gheorghiu-Dej, Iosif Chișinevschi, and Securitate chief Alexandru Drăghici, into the proceedings, as well as inhumane treatment to which Luca had been subjected. It resulted in Luca's rehabilitation in 1968, although the final verdict seemed to confirm that Luca had betrayed some of his comrades during his 1920s stay in Jilava Prison.
