= Gherea =

Gherea may refer to:

- Constantin Dobrogeanu-Gherea, Romanian Marxist philosopher, or either of his two sons:
  - Alexandru Dobrogeanu-Gherea, communist militant
  - Ionel Gherea, philosopher and pianist
- a former village in the commune of Ceanu Mare, Cluj County
