= Aladar Imre =

Romanian trade unionist and communist politician (1898–1937)

- Born: February 14, 1898; Bucharest, Kingdom of Romania
- Died: 1937 (aged 38–39); Tiraspol, Soviet Union
- Cause of death: Execution
- Other names: Aurel, Barcagiu, Nicolae, Pavel Corneliu
- Occupations: Trade unionist, communist militant, politician
- Parents: Janos Imre (father); Maria Boer (mother)

Aladar Imre (February 14, 1898 – 1937) was a Romanian trade unionist, communist militant and member-elect of the Romanian Parliament. Under the name Pavel Corneliu (Russian: Павел Владимирович Корнелиу, romanized: Pavel Vladimirovich Korneliu), he was also active as a writer, editor and playwright in the Moldavian Autonomous Soviet Socialist Republic, before being executed on accusations of nationalism during the Great Purge.

== Biography ==
=== Early life ===
Aladar Imre was born in 1898 in Bucharest to Janos Imre, an ethnic Hungarian lumberjack, and Maria Boer, of Romanian origins. The family had earlier left the Austro-Hungarian ruled Transylvania and moved to Romania in order to escape political persecution, the father dying when Aladar was six years old. After completing six grades, he began working as an apprentice in a carpentry workshop. It was here that Imre became interested in the study circle of the apprentices and the carpenters' trade union. Around 1911-1912, he participated in the political courses offered by the Bucharest socialist club, where militants such as I. C. Frimu, Christian Rakovsky, Dumitru Marinescu, and Mihail Gheorghiu Bujor provided guidance for the young workers. According to the commission that invalidated his Parliament seat in 1931, in 1916 Imre was drafted in the 24th Regiment of the Royal Hungarian Army.

=== Union leadership ===
In 1919 Imre joined the Circle of the Socialist Youth, the youth wing of the Socialist Party of Romania, participating in the major Bucharest strikes organised by the party in 1920. Around this period, he was also elected a member in the leadership of the carpenters' trade union. Joining the newly established Romanian Communist Party (PCdR) in 1922, Imre became responsible for the party's relations with the labour movement. In 1923 he was designated regional secretary of the Union of the Wood Workers of Romania, as well as secretary of the Bucharest Local Commission of the Trade Unions. As a representative of the trade unions in the timber industry, he participated along Constantin Ivănuș and Coloman Müller in the collective bargaining with the General Union of the Industrialists of Romania (UGIR). Several important gains were obtained, such as the signing of collective agreements in a large part of the Romanian industrial enterprises and the recognition of the trade unions, including the communist-influenced Unitary Trade Unions. In late 1923, after the September Cluj Congress resulted in a major split in the labour movement, Imre managed to retain the unity of the Union of the trade unions in the timber industry and its affiliation to the General Council of the Unitary Trade Unions (CGSU), also militating for unity în the workers' movement. In the same year, as secretary of the union, he organised a 30-day-long strike of the timber industry workers in 28 enterprises and 80 carpentry workshops in Cluj, managing to achieve the acceptance of most of the workers' demands.

In 1924 Imre was arrested for political agitation, and, although the Siguranța could not confirm his lack of Romanian citizenship, the Romanian authorities decided to expel him to Hungary. The Hungarian authorities denied him entry, stating he did not have Hungarian citizenship; nevertheless the Romanian authorities forced him past the border post. After spending several hours in no man's land, he clandestinely returned to Romania. Three more attempts to expel him were made in 1924 and 1925, all having similar outcomes. In spite of persecution, he was still able to keep in contact with the labour movement. Thus, in late 1924 and 1925 he succeeded in bringing into the CGSU several trade unions from Galați and Piatra Neamț. In August 1926 he was again arrested after organising a strike among the workers of the Army's Pyrotechnics Factory in Bucharest, and in 1927 he was brought before the War Council of the Second Army Corps for leading a strike of the typographers. Accused of activities against public order, his trial was postponed several times before he was acquitted due to lack of evidence. Arrested again in March 1928, Aladar Imre was a defendant in the Cluj trial, being again acquitted.

=== Communist Party politics ===
By 1928, persecution from the Romanian authorities, coupled with differences among the leadership, threw the PCdR into disarray, with most of its militants under arrest in Romania or in self-imposed exile. The Third International (Comintern) sought to reorganise the party, and convened a congress, the 4th in the party's history, near Harkov. Hastily organised by the Communist Party of Ukraine (CP(b)U), with almost the total exclusion of the Romanian leadership, the congress fully adopted the points of view of the Comintern. Aladar Imre was included the praesidium, and requested representatives of both the party's Central Committee (based in Romania) and the exiled political bureau be given deliberative vote. Nevertheless, he rejected the inclusion of any of the members of the former leadership in the newly established Central Committee. Imre headed the congress' commission on the labour movement, also preparing its resolution, and was elected in the party's Central Committee. During his stay in the Soviet Union, along with Vitali Holostenco, Elek Köblös, and Ion Heigel, he represented the party at the 6th World Congress of the Comintern in Moscow.

Back in Romania, he was designated secretary of the CGSU in late 1928, and in this position he was part of a committee, which also included Dumitru Grofu, Iancu Olteanu, and Coloman Müller, that organised a unionisation campaign among Romania's workers. The campaign was regarded as a success, as the number of workers affiliated with the CGSU grew from fifteen thousand to thirty thousand between November 1928 and February 1929. Beginning with April 1928, Imre was also the editor in chief of the short-lived bilingual Romanian-Hungarian newspaper Ferarul (Vasmunkás), the organ of the Unitary trade union of the workers in the chemical, metalworking and petroleum industry. In recognition of his organisational merits, the April 1929 General Congress of the CGSU held in Timișoara elected him secretary. Imre was arrested days after the Congress along several other union leaders, including Grofu, Müller, and Vasile Luca, being eventually amnestied in 1930. As a result of increased factional struggle, Aladar Imre was excluded from the Central Committee of the PCdR during the October 1929 conference.

=== Election to the Parliament ===
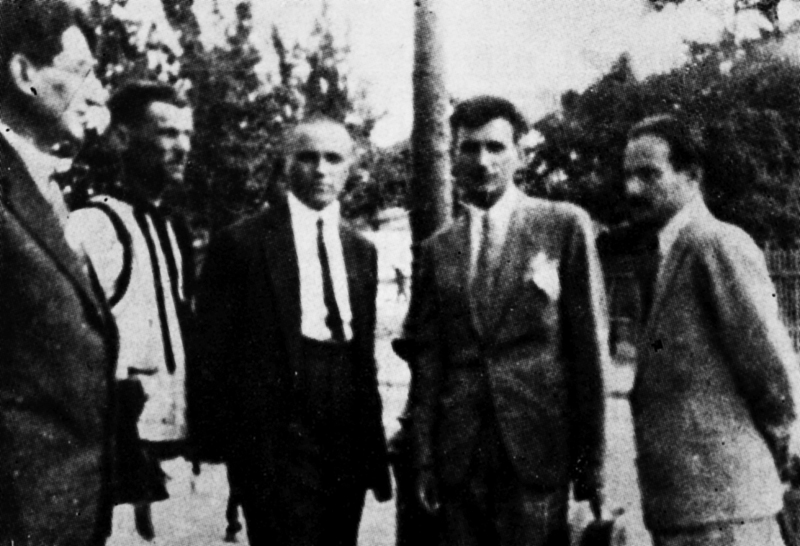
Aladar Imre (first from right) and the other deputies of the Workers and Peasants' Bloc elected in the 1931 Romanian parliamentary elections

As the Communist Party, outlawed by the Romanian government in 1924, sought to continue participating in the country's political life, a legal front organisation was set up, the Peasant Workers' Bloc (BMȚ), in order to contest the elections. Imre joined the leadership of the Bloc in 1926, and participated on the party's list in the local elections. In the 1931 legislative elections, Imre contested for a seat in the lower chamber of the Parliament of Romania, and succeeded in being elected in the Bihor and Satu Mare constituencies. As Lucrețiu Pătrășcanu, Eugen Rozvan and another two members of BMȚ also won the popular vote, the party entered the Parliament. The election of communist deputies provoked outrage in the right-wing press, with nationalist newspaper Curentul leading a press campaign for their ousting, no matter the means. At the request of the government, a Parliament commission invalidated two of the mandates, including Imre's. As a result, the results of the Bloc were lowered below the electoral threshold, thus invalidating all the seats won. The arguments for Imre's invalidation were his supposed lack of Romanian citizenship, and a previous political conviction, amnestied in 1930. Some members of the commission, including Nicolae L. Lupu, disagreed with the conclusions, and left the commission in protests. Imre also disputed the arguments of the commission, ascertaining that, by drafting him for one month in the Romanian Army in 1927, the authorities had virtually recognised his citizenship. The left-aligned press, including Adevărul, condemned the invalidation as a government abuse. Nicolae Iorga, who at the time was serving as prime-minister, later acknowledged that the invalidation of the communist seats was based on a technicality.

=== Exile and literary activity ===
The Romanian Council of Ministers decided on August 29, 1931, to expel Imre, and he chose to leave for the Soviet Union. Participating in the Fifth Congress of the PCdR, held near Moscow that year, he joined David Avramescu in criticising the congress for its lack of representativeness, only to be rebuffed by Bela Kun. As the CGSU delegate, during the congress he also presented a report on the Romanian trade unions.

In 1932, as the authorities of the Moldavian Autonomous Soviet Socialist Republic (MASSR) transitioned the Moldovan language to a Latin-based script and aligned its standard register with the Romanian literary norm, Romanian exiles in the Soviet Union, including Ecaterina Arbore, Alexandru Nicolau, Alter Zalic and Imre, were sent to the republic to assist in this linguistic shift. Moving to the autonomous republic within the Ukrainian Soviet Socialist Republic in March 1932, he adopted the name Pavel Corneliu and was appointed to various administrative positions at Octombrie, the MASSR's leading literary magazine, also becoming a member of the Moldavian Scientific Committee. Along Ion Ocinschi, Mihail Andriescu, and Samuil Lehtțir, he was an editor of the first Moldavian edition of Marx's Das Kapital using the Latin script. Some local writers and administrators however resisted the new language policy, perceiving the efforts of the Romanian immigrants as attempts to "Francize" the literary language and make it incomprehensible to local peasants.

During this period, Imre was also active in the literary scene of the MASSR, contributing poems, short stories, and plays written in Romanian. According to researcher Petru Negură, Imre's works explored a variety of themes central to Soviet ideology. These included the portrayal of the Soviet motherland as a nation of free workers, contrasted with the capitalist world, the need to defend the motherland from potential capitalist attacks, and the enthusiastic labor of Soviet peasants and workers towards achieving state plans. His works also highlighted the dedication of Communist Party members, criticized priests as hypocritical internal enemies, and framed the struggle against former exploiters as a noble cause. Additionally, Imre's writings emphasized the youth's battle against the remnants of the past and condemned Western bourgeois literature.

In addition to his contributions to various newspapers and magazines, he published at least five volumes in 1934 in Balta and Tiraspol, all edited by Lehtțir. These works included Amarnica 'ncercare ("The Harrowing Ordeal", poetry), O călătorie ("A journey", memoirs), Ordinea ("The order", a three-act play), Printre gânduri ("Amidst Thoughts", poetry), and Robii revoltați ("The Defiant Slaves", poetry). Historian Marius Tărîță argues that, although Imre's works had ideological undertones, they were "considerably more literary" than those authored by the local Moldavian writers. The poetry volumes contained both original works and translations from Hungarian poet Sándor Petőfi, whose anti-monarchist themes aligned with Soviet ideals. In particular, Tărîță considers that Imre's poetry was influenced by the styles of Mihai Eminescu and the early works of Octavian Goga. In reviewing a group of poems likely written in Crimea, Tărîță describes them as "deeply lyrical" and "nonconforming to Bolshevik literary guidelines". He also highlights Imre's satirical contribution to an almanac celebrating the 15th anniversary of the October Revolution, which "evidenced a certain talent for describing the atmosphere with lyrical overtones." The likely autobiographical volume O călătorie describes the journey of a clandestine communist through Romania in the aftermath of the Tatarbunary Uprising, with Tărîță noting its auto-ironic undertones.

Ordinea won Imre the first place in the 1933 competition for original plays organized by the People's Commissariat of Education of the MASSR, which included fourteen submissions. The play depicted scenes from the struggles of Romanian workers, led by the PCdR, against the exploitation of the capitalist regime, as well as against social injustice and political discrimination. It depicted social democrats as complicit with the capitalists, acting in their interests and receiving financial support from them. Reviewing the play in the 1960s, researcher Haralambie Corbu acknowledged its political significance within its historical context but noted that it was generally a mediocre work, characterized by underdeveloped and lackluster characters. Imre was also identified by Corbu under the pseudonym P.V. Petraru, as the author of the introduction to another play depicting the struggles of Romania's toiling masses: Socoteala ("The Reckoning") by I.C. Vasilenco. In the preface, Imre highlighted the play’s polemical nature, explaining that it was inspired by a short story of the same name by Alexandru Vlahuță. The play aimed to demonstrate that the destitute condition of the Romanian peasant was not due to individual shortcomings, as suggested by Vlahuță, but rather a consequence of the capitalist system. In 1934, Moldavian actress V. Dicusar already considered Imre's play Aer curat ("Fresh Air"), along with D. Milev's Două lumi ("Two worlds"), as unsuitable for staging, being "mere illustrative material [...] rich in revolutionary pathos."

=== Cultural debates in the Moldavian ASSR ===
In the latter half of 1933, amid the pushback against Ukrainization, Imre, then serving as secretary of both Octombrie and the Scientific Committee, joined E. Bagrov, head of the Committee's historical section, in submitting petitions to the leadership of the Ukrainian and Moldavian Communist Parties complaining about the cultural policy in the republic. The petitions argued that the dangers of Russian and Ukrainian nationalism in the MASSR were more significant than those posed by local nationalism. The two also claimed that some Moldavian writers exploited the struggle against nationalism for personal gain, leading to the unjust removal of valuable specialists. Thus, in a letter to G. Bulat, first secretary of the regional party committee, dated June 1933, Imre complained that the Latinization Committee failed to adequately oversee the funds it distributed, while most state institution either did not use Moldovan signage at all, or employed improper spelling. He also criticized the language used by the state radio, which he found incomprehensible, as well as the syntax, spelling and terminology used by Moldova Socialistă, the official newspaper of the MASSR. To address these issues, he recommended that a Moldovan speaker familiar with the affairs of neighbouring Romania be appointed as head of the Cultural Propaganda department of the party committee and that a liaison office of the PCdR be established in the MASSR to better inform the locals about the developments in Romania (such as the recent widespread strikes). Summoned by the Tiraspol Party Committee in December 1933, Imre defended himself by arguing that the editorial office of Octombrie was largely inactive, which had forced him to assume responsibility for the majority of the magazine’s operations. This, he claimed, had led to some oversights and ideological errors in the publication.

As a result of such petitions, both Imre and Bagrov were accused of Moldavian nationalism and dismissed from their positions. Bagrov was also temporarily expelled from the party, only to be reinstated by a decision of the CP(b)U. Their views were subsequently condemned as "anti-Bolshevik" by many local writers, with Imre's book O călătorie being the target of criticism in both Octombrie and Moldova Socialistă. Following his dismissal, Imre was assigned by the People's Commissariat of Education of the MASSR to work in the Moldavian department of the Theatre Technical School in Odessa. However, one year later, he was dismissed again, this time accused of hiring Dumitrașco, a Moldavian "nationalist," as a Russian language teacher, though the charges against Dumitrașco were later dropped. In response to Imre's protests, two articles were published in Moldova Socialistă accusing him of being "counter-revolutionary," effectively blacklisting him from publishing in the Moldavian press. Bulat publicly rebuked Imre and other Romanian exiles, including Bagrov, A. Dobrogeanu-Gherea, and S. Creangă, during a party meeting in the autumn of 1934. He accused them of attempting to establish a "hegemony of Bessarabians," create a base for counter-revolutionary bourgeois elements, and replace the Bolshevik leadership of the MASSR with a "bourgeois-nationalist" one. Imre ultimately appealed to the Odessa Regional Party Committee, requesting that they either expel him from the party or clear him from the charges and reinstate him as a lecturer of Moldavian language and literature.

=== Soviet repression and death ===
By 1935, Imre was back in Tiraspol, where he published pamphlets criticizing the Romanian electoral system. In 1937 he was working as an editor at the Moldavian State Publishing House. However, with the onset of the Great Purge, he was dismissed and expelled from the party, alongside many colleagues, following a Regional Party Committee inspection in mid-July. The publishing house's director, Mihail Baluh, and its staff, many of whom were Romanian émigrés, were accused of forming a group of "Trotskyists" and nationalists intent on Romanianizing the Moldovan language. Imre and Alexandru Dîmbul were further singled out as "nationalist Romanianizers" in a letter sent by the First Secretary of the Moldavian Regional Party Committee to Georgy Malenkov in August 1937.

On October 18, 1937, Imre was sentenced to death for "espionage and diversionary activities in favor of Romania" based on evidence gathered by the MASSR border guards. The execution of the sentence was temporarily suspended on October 23, as he was still of interest to the Directorate of State Security of the People's Commissariat for Internal Affairs (NKVD). Around the same time, the MASSR authorities decided to switch back Moldovan to a Cyrillic-based alphabet, with a February 1938 decision of the regional party committee condemning the Latinization as an attempt by "bourgeois-nationalist elements" to Romanianize the language. Imre was posthumously rehabilitated in 1968 by a commission of the Romanian Communist Party, along with other Romanian victims of the purges.
