= Ionel Gherea =

Romanian philosopher, essayist, and pianist

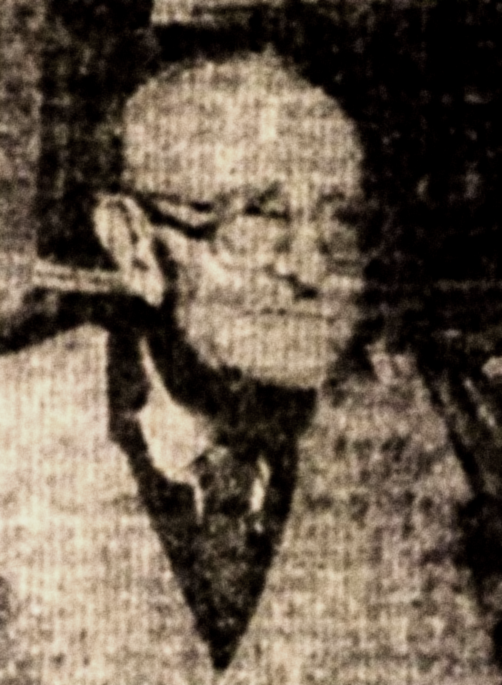
- Gherea c. 1978
- Born: 1895; Ploiești, Kingdom of Romania
- Died: December 15, 1978 (aged 83); Bucharest, Romania

Education
- Education: University of Bucharest

Philosophical work
- Era: 20th-century philosophy
- Region: Western philosophy
- School: Idealism; Rationalism; Consequentialism; Criterion
- Main interests: Phenomenology, philosophy of self, ontology, aesthetics

Ionel Gherea, also known as Ioan Dobrogeanu-Gherea or Ion D. Gherea (Francized J. D. Ghéréa; 1895 – December 15, 1978), was a Romanian philosopher, essayist, and concert pianist. The son of Constantin Dobrogeanu-Gherea, a Marxist theoretician and critic, and the brother of communist militant Alexandru "Sașa" Gherea, he was only mildly interested in politics of any kind, embracing an apolitical form of left-libertarianism. Largely self-taught, he became interested in the aestheticism of his brother-in-law, Paul Zarifopol, who became one of his main references. As a youth, Zarifopol took him to meet playwright Ion Luca Caragiale and his family, who were also influential on Gherea's writing, and the focus of his old-age memoirs. Gherea's debut as a writer was a 1920 novel written jointly with Luca Caragiale, which was also his only contribution to the genre. Following Constantin's death and Sașa's imprisonment, he had to handle family affairs, but his mismanagement of their money led him into remorseful despair; in 1924, he briefly disappeared, and was presumed to have committed suicide.

Enjoying national success as an accompanist for George Enescu and répétiteur for the Bucharest Conservatory, Gherea also became a respected literary essayist, well-liked for his impressionistic approach and his direct expression. He was also a noted Romanian phenomenologist, ontologist, and philosopher of art; his main work was condensed and published in France as Le Moi el le monde (1933), which was only translated into Romanian some six years after his death. Gherea's lasting friendship with philosopher Constantin Noica transcended ethnic and ideological barriers, also bringing him into contact with the far-right thinker Nae Ionescu. As a committed anti-authoritarian, Gherea was repressed by during the first decade of Romanian communism, being identified as "decadent" by the regime's official philosopher, Constantin Ionescu Gulian. He reemerged in the 1960s as a memoirist and Nietzsche translator, and was sought after to provide details on his father's family life. Selections from Gherea's essays appeared in quick succession, but, having lived a discreet life, he was still largely ignored by the public at the time of his death.

== Biography ==
=== Origins and early life ===
Born into a Jewish family in Ploiești, he was the third child of Marxist doyen Constantin Dobrogeanu-Gherea and his wife Sofia (née Parcevska, or Parcevskaia), herself noted as a translator of stories by Anton Chekhov and Maxim Gorky. The family originated in Yekaterinoslav, a Ukrainian part of the Russian Empire: patriarch Gherea, born Solomon Abramovich Katz, fled to Romania to escape persecution for his political activism, and worked menial jobs before getting his break in journalism. At Iași, he married Sofia; she was the daughter of a Polish gourmet chef, who was also Gherea's business associate. Around the time of Ionel's birth, his father, mother, and his grown-up siblings were managing the Ploiești Train Station Restaurant, a venue for commercial and literary transactions, but also a hangout for Romanian and exile Russian Marxists, including Leon Trotsky and Pavel Axelrod. Alexandru soon made his name as a revolutionary socialist, and later communist, militant.

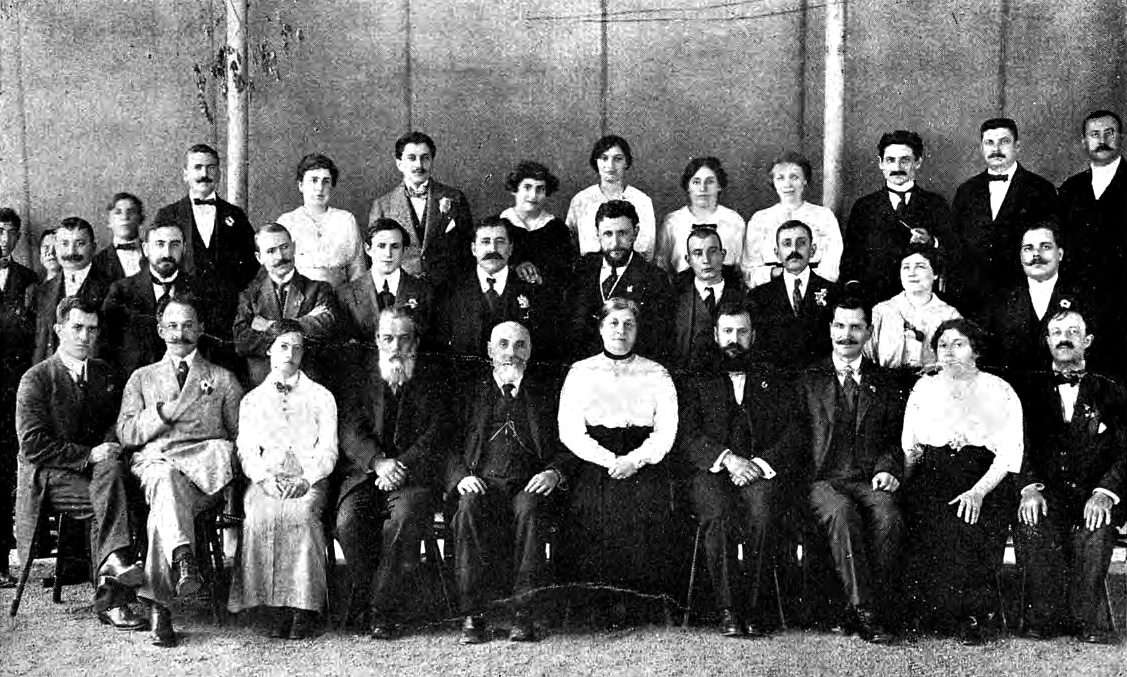
Romanian socialists gathered in Ploiești for Constantin Dobrogeanu-Gherea's 60th anniversary, in 1915. Constantin and Sofia Gherea in the front row, seated (fifth and sixth from the left, alongside Christian Rakovsky and I. C. Frimu. Ionel and Alexandru Dobrogeanu-Gherea are seated in the second row, fourth and fifth from the left (between Gheorghe Cristescu and Ottoi Călin). Ștefania is also pictured, directly above Alexandru and holding her hand on his shoulder

Gherea's early education took place at home, largely because his father feared that he would otherwise be exposed to scarlet fever and tonsillitis; Constantin also made sure that his youngest son would be introduced to serious literature, beginning with works by Charles Dickens and Leo Tolstoy. Ionel then enrolled at the local Saints Peter and Paul High School, where he graduated from the sciences section. It was around that time that the young Gherea brothers met the writer and political radical N. D. Cocea, who, Ionel notes, had a "great power of seduction". Alexandru and Ionel were split over political issues: while both had a calling for socialism, Ionel saw himself as "not at all political in spirit"; Cocea then scolded him over his apparent passivity: "he told me that a time would come when I'll come to regret not taking an interest in, and not fighting for, the future of mankind".

Together with his elder sister Ștefania and her husband, literary critic Paul Zarifopol, Ionel lived in Germany for a time, especially in Leipzig, and in Italy, but returned home upon the outbreak of World War I. In his father's houses in Ploiești and Sinaia, as well as in Germany, he became acquainted with Caragiale; Gherea became friends with the playwright's younger son Luca (Luki). Other cultural figures whom he met in the family homes include Barbu Ștefănescu Delavrancea, Alexandru Vlahuță, George Coșbuc, Panait Cerna and Sextil Pușcariu. His memoirs include sharply drawn portraits as well as revealing anecdotes about Caragiale and his elder son, Mateiu. As noted by cultural sociologist Zigu Ornea, the war ended young Gherea's prospects of studying in Germany; though his father was pained by this apparent failure, Ionel himself found an opportunity to read only what he pleased, and slid into bohemianism.

Literary critic Alexandru Paleologu sees Zarifopol as Gherea Jr's main "intellectual influence"—their literary contributions were forever twinned, though not entirely alike. Around 1915, Ionel was in the audience as Gherea Sr gave some of his select few speeches at gatherings of the Social Democratic Party. According to one report in Opinia newspaper, his earliest philosophical contributions came out that year, in Constantin Rădulescu-Motru's Noua Revistă Română. Ionel had entered the University of Bucharest Faculty of Letters, where he became close friends with poet Artur Enășescu and met Tudor Vianu, his fellow critic. He was also close to Lucia Demetrius, and, together with Zarifopol, helped her launch her career as a novelist.

To his father's chagrin, Ionel Gherea never graduated, focusing instead on his literary career. Together with Luki, he wrote the novel Nevinovățiile viclene ("The Cunning Naïvetés"). A study in adolescent psychology, which has earned posthumous appreciation, it appeared in Viața Romînească in 1920. The work shocked conservative sensibilities with its supposed libertinage, and was only taken up by the literary magazine following Zarifopol's intercession. Novelist Ionel Teodoreanu, famous for similar novels of the interwar, recognized them as precursors in the field of "adolescent literature", but also noted that Gherea surpassed the expectations by also returning as an accomplished critic. He recalls that Viața Romînească's chief ideologue, Garabet Ibrăileanu, had likened young Gherea to an Arabian colt, overflowing with qualities.

Ionel and Ștefania Gherea looked after their father during his terminal illness in 1920; with Luki dying the next year, Gherea Jr never returned to fiction writing. In 1922, he married the daughter of a Romanian engineer, Popovici, originally from Ploiești; she brought him a sizable dowry. Also then, Alexandru was involved in the creation of a Romanian Communist Party, an activity which saw his prosecution in the Dealul Spirii Trial. Its proceedings were attended by Sofia, who had to be evicted after her emotional outburst. During this interval, Ionel was handling family affairs, but lost some of the assets—as much as 200 thousand lei—with his market speculation. In early 1924, his relatives reported him as missing, fearing that the "fragile young man" he was going to harm himself over his shame. Based on details from a letter he had addressed to his wife, Opinia reported that he had committed suicide in Constanța, on March 5; Alexandru Gherea and Zarifopol reportedly traveled there to see for themselves.

=== Pianist-philosopher ===
Later in the 1920s, Gherea dedicated himself to philosophy and criticism, with essays which appeared in Revue Philosophique, Viața Romînească and its satellite, Adevărul Literar și Artistic, Kalende, later in Zarifopol's Revista Fundațiilor Regale and Revista de Filosofie. Such works reveal his intellectual debt to Blaise Pascal; a generous use of irony; complex readings from Tolstoy and Fyodor Dostoyevsky, but also of Marcel Proust, Paul Valéry, Francis Jammes, and Knut Hamsun. As he noted in a 1975 interview, his father was only an indirect influence on his work, shaping his own "left-wing sympathies" and his belief that "the social environment [explains] the aesthetic phenomenon". His abstract, philosophically grounded speculations somewhat resemble Zarifopol's (with much of it stemming from a single conversation they had in 1915 or 1916); unlike his onetime mentor, he often wrote down impressionist thoughts in the manner of Anatole France, one of his favorite authors, glossing over the discrepancies and limitations of the texts he discussed. According to Paleologu, he is most akin stylistically to the Anglo-Saxon essayists, from T. S. Eliot and G. K. Chesterton to Bertrand Russell, being similarly adverse to "all pedantry or arrogance". Gherea is especially known for his pioneering study on Proust's snobbery, which appeared in the 1929 edition of Adevărul Literar și Artistic, and in which he opposed Zarifopol's own Proustianism.

Gherea was also friends with violinist-composer George Enescu: in 1927 or 1928, he accompanied Enescu as a pianist on a domestic concert tour, also leaving anecdotes from that encounter. According to Ornea, this "supreme recognition of his talent" was made possible after Enescu was told of Gherea's abilities by another pianist, Florica Musicescu. Enescu took Gherea on his other tours, including a concert at Constanța Casino in mid 1934. As reported by music chronicler A. Liviu, that show was remarkably ill-fated, attesting to the poor state of culture in Constanța: "Enescu's name only managed to attract twenty individuals. Of them, the majority were... cracking seeds, at intermission. That's one authentic fact for you. As for the delicate accompanist, Mr Ionel Gherea: he had to struggle with an upright piano that was missing some ten keys." The two men reunited in 1936, when Enescu returned to the country and included Gherea on his team of touring pianists, which also included Dinu Lipatti, Alfred Alessandrescu, and Muza Ghermani Ciomac. Gherea claimed that, overall, he had been Enescu's piano accompanist in as many as 300 separate performances.

As Teodoreanu reported in his 1935 memoir Masa umbrelor, Gherea was becoming "virtually unknown in Romania". During those years, he was writing a lengthy treatise on the philosophy of self; titled Le Moi el le monde. Essai d'une cosmogonie anthropomorphique ("The Self and the World. An Essay in Anthropomorphic Cosmogony"), it initially appeared in 1933 in the Paris-based Revue de Métaphysique et de Morale. It was published in book form in Paris and in Bucharest in 1938. The book was noted by reviewer Constantin Floru for its disregard toward academic terminology, basing itself on "common sense", "years-long meditation", and "the erudition of a subtle spirit". Ornea similarly notes that the largely self-taught Gherea was fortunately indifferent to philosophical traditions, and was therefore able to describe the common ground between seemingly opposite thinkers—his system "reconciled" Immanuel Kant with George Berkeley, Ernst Mach, and Richard Avenarius. It earned Gherea the friendship and admiration of academic philosophers Constantin Noica and Petru Comarnescu, who prepared the book for Editura Fundațiilor Regale. Noica referred to Gherea as an "innovative" asset in Romanian philosophy, comparing him to Stéphane Lupasco and Pius Servien. In a 1989 interview, he was more skeptical:

I had this friend, Ionel Gherea, who could only write about the problem of the self. He could not write on any other topic, and claimed there was no reason to even write on any other topic. I asked him: let's say there's this American fella and he's wiring to you that "I'll be in Bucharest tomorrow, to find out from you what the self means." Would you know what to tell him? Ionel Gherea answered: yes I would. That's when I sensed he was no philosopher. [Because] I myself wouldn't know.

Le Moi el le monde was in large part a critique of common sense, which tried to control the influence of metaphysics (as Gherea put it: "I am not at all a metaphysician"). It mapped out an independent phenomenology and ontology, imagining situations in which the "coexistence" of individual minds creates an implicit need for time perception, which inevitably leads them to the noumenon—hence, "cosmogony is anthropomorphic". Gherea affirmed that the "pure self" existed beyond the successive phases of memory and psychology; as read by Floru, he understood selves as monadic units, with direct reference to Leibniz's ontological essences. Gherea's "anthropomorphism" was nevertheless a critique of "naive" materialism, seeking to rehabilitate idealism with input from particle physics; the overall result is labeled by Ornea as a kind of "rationalist idealism", and by Paleologu as a uniquely "gnostic" and "immanentistic" anti-mysticism. Lucrețiu Pătrășcanu, himself a historical materialist, found the work to be "original", but remained critical of Gherea's implicit agnosticism and explicit consequentialism.

During the early 1930s, Gherea and Noica were involved with the Criterion cultural forum. He was supposed to lecture there about the phenomenology of Edmund Husserl, but, being a timid man, lost his composure; he was filled in by Mircea Vulcănescu, who reused his notes. He and Noica became friends, despite the latter being a right-leaning national conservative. Noica wrote in 1936:

One of the several things about [Gherea] that left a mark on me is that, although he lives in a leftist milieu and carries a surname dear to the Jewish and socialist circles, he has never once profited from this and has been living in want, at least for these past few years.

=== Repression and recovery ===
The rise of Iron Guard fascism and antisemitism was a disappointment for Gherea—as documented by Mihail Sebastian, himself a Zarifopol disciple and fellow Jewish writer. However, with Vulcănescu and Noica, he remained one of the "young philosophers and disciples" who stood by metaphysician and Guard affiliate Nae Ionescu, when the latter was released from a concentration camp for political prisoners. In December 1940, the Iron Guard's National Legionary government ordered his father's remains to be exhumed and reburied in a Jewish-only cemetery. After World War II and the fall of fascism, Gherea, whose brother had taken refuge to the Soviet Union and been killed as a dissident during the Great Purge, was troubled by the prospects of communization. In a 1946 interview with Ion Biberi, he expressed his support for a "tolerant and libertarian democracy", but believed that the future belonged to "the sort of socialism that prevents people from speaking their mind." Gherea's work was initially given positive coverage by the Romanian Communist Party's România Liberă. In February 1945, it called attention to him as a critic of idealism, and as such compatible with Marxism. In March of the following year, Gherea signed a communist letter of protest against Francoist Spain, demanding that it be isolated internationally after Cristino García's execution.

Ionel was the only Gherea of his generation to have survived into the 1950s; he was the family doyen, an elder to his first-cousins Fany (Alexandru's daughter) and Sonia and Paul Zarifopol. Gherea's final decades were lived under the communist regime. Branded a "decadent" philosopher in the Marxist works of Constantin Ionescu Gulian, he was marginalized together with other thinkers of his generation. By 1955, his father, Constantin, was being officially recovered as a precursor of socialist realism, the standard literary dogma, but his works appeared only in censored form. Ornea began publishing Constantin Dobrogeanu-Gherea's works for Editura de Stat pentru Literatură și Artă, and needed Ionel's permission. The two authors met in October of that year, with Ornea recalling that: "everything in [Gherea's] self-presentation [was indicative of] a great material distress." He had been stripped of his position as répétiteur for the Bucharest Conservatory, and was tutoring for a living; he refused to answer most of Ornea's questions about "the old socialist movement", preferring instead to reminisce about Caragiale and his own siblings.

Ionel Gherea was mainly focused on translation work, putting out versions of Jammes, Thomas de Quincey and Heinrich Mann into Romanian, while rendering Ion Marin Sadoveanu's Sfârșit de veac în București into French. In the late 1950s, Gherea's continued visits with Noica became a subject of interest for Securitate agents, who were monitoring Noica for his former Iron Guard affiliation. Noica and many of his friends were arrested and tried in 1960, with Gherea himself interrogated. Later that decade, the regime introduced controlled liberalization, and Gulian was sidelined. Gherea's work became more available. A book of his memoirs, Amintiri, appeared at Editura pentru Literatură in 1968—as noted by Ornea: "curiously, it featured [...] only a few lateral mentions about his father", with most of the text being about the Caragiales, the Zarifopols, and Enescu; he confessed to Ornea that he did not see a point to adding details on Constantin's already well-researched biography. Nevinovățiile viclene came out in a paperback edition at Editura Tineretului, 1969. Paleologu still offered his praise to this "booklet", noting its "charming and wise simplicity".

On May 7, 1970, Gherea was a guest at the unveiling of a Bucharest bust of his father, done by Naum Cornescu; also present were communist dignitaries—Miron Constantinescu, Gheorghe Pană, Constantin Pîrvulescu, Dumitru Popa—as well as "old militants of the labor movement". His essays were reprinted in Manuscriptum, then as the 1971 Eseuri ("Essays"), followed by a book of philosophical humor, Despre cîteva absurdități folositoare ("On Those More Useful Absurdities"). The latter book was influenced by Henri Bergson's Essay on the Immediate Data of Consciousness, suggesting that common sense had confounded time perception into duration; Gherea believed, however, that such confusion was productive in both everyday life and cultural experience. Living his final years in Bucharest, he was sought after by his father's Hungarian Romanian biographer and translator, Gyula Csehi, their interviews published in Igaz Szó on Gherea's 70th birthday. Csehi left this portrait of Gherea Jr: "His face is surprisingly like his father's. He is a quiet, gentle, thoughtful man, mindful of all exaggeration." Returning to philosophical work, in 1978 Gherea and Ion Herdan also published a translation from Nietzsche's Birth of Tragedy, also signaling a recovery for the German thinker; the book, put out by Editura Meridiane, did not feature the author's name, and was intertwined with fragments from Gotthold Ephraim Lessing, Erwin Rohde, and Johann Joachim Winckelmann, making its homage to Nietzsche harder to detect by regular censorship.

Medical historian G. Brătescu, who formed a friendship with the aging Gherea, was entertained by him with stories about Enescu and about Sașa Gherea. To the sadness of his friends, the philosopher was experiencing mental decline, and on one occasion complained publicly that he could no longer remember his home address. Gherea died shortly after his Nietzsche book had seen print—according to Ornea, "it seemed to him almost indecent that he should still linger among us." The date of his death is sometimes given as November 5, 1978, while Ornea has 1979. The death announcement, published in România Liberă by Fany (married Lipatti), together with the Zarifopol cousins, reports December 15, 1978.

== Legacy ==
Paleologu authored an obituary for România Literară in January 1979, in which he noted:

Just before the [winter] holidays, the philosopher, essayist and musician Ioan D. Gherea has died, an octogenarian; except for the notice that his family sent to the newspapers, there was not a single line on this event published anywhere in the literary press. [...] The unnoticed dead of a sage carries something of profound and exemplary significance; that is the way in which Lao-Tseu passed.

Gherea's 1938 study was only fully published in Romanian in 1984, as Eul și lumea (a translation done by Mariana Noica). Shortly after the Romanian Revolution of 1989, critic Ion Negoițescu reflected on the overall failure of literary Marxism in Romania, noting that this tradition had already broken down when both Ionel Gherea and Zarifopol chose aestheticism.
