= Remus Koffler =

Remus Koffler (1902 – April 17, 1954) was a Romanian communist activist who, during the 1930s and 1940s, helped assure financing for the Romanian Communist Party. Arrested in 1949 as an inconvenient survivor, he was executed over four years later.

== Biography ==
=== Origins and early life ===
According to his autobiography, which he wrote in early 1950, while held under arrest by the Securitate secret police of Communist Romania, he was born in Bucharest in 1902. His father Isac, initially a merchant in Galați, eventually owned a factory and several houses before losing his fortune in 1926, and died in 1941. A free spender, he amassed wealth during the German occupation of Romania (1916-1918), by selling bulk quantities of liqueurs to the temporary rulers. His mother (Ernestina née Blatt) was a merchant's daughter and died in 1920. His father was an authoritarian figure whose arguments with his wife left a lasting impression on Koffler. Although the family was Jewish, Koffler was baptized, and attended a Catholic followed by a Lutheran school.

After attending several grades at Matei Basarab High School, he passed the baccalaureate exam at Zürich in 1920. His interest in politics began in primary school; influenced by his father, he sided with the Central Powers during World War I. Near the war's end, he became a Zionist. In 1919, he read the Communist Manifesto, followed by a work of Leon Trotsky on the Bolshevik victory in the Russian Revolution; the same year, when he reached Zürich, he declared himself a communist. In 1920, in Bucharest, he joined the Socialist Party of Romania. In response, his father beat him and took away his party card, also inflicting blows upon the son for reading Socialistul newspaper. Leaving to study in Berlin, he attended communist meetings, took part in demonstrations and agitated on Soviet Russia's behalf. In autumn 1920, while in the German capital, he contracted syphilis from a girl he brought to his room, and was continuing treatment as late as 1948.

=== Activity in Romania and late Weimar Germany ===
Koffler married in the early 1920s; his daughter was born in 1925. The same year, at the insistence of his father, who soon went bankrupt, he returned to Romania without having graduated. In Bucharest, he met communist activist Timotei Marin, whom he hid after the latter escaped a dragnet initiated in August 1926 by the Siguranța secret police of the Kingdom of Romania. This investigation also targeted Pavel Tcacenco, Boris Ștefanov and Elek Köblös, all members of the banned Communist Party of Romania (PCdR, later PCR). He also became acquainted with Lucrețiu Pătrășcanu. Koffler ran a firm until 1927, when he departed for Germany yet again.

In Berlin, he was affiliated with the Communist Party of Germany (KPD), taking part in clandestine operations. At the time, Berlin was not only an important center for communists, but was also a hub for Comintern activities throughout Europe. Moreover, the political and economic crisis of the Weimar Republic created a dynamic atmosphere, with Koffler partaking in street movements, demonstrations and campaigns. In 1930, he formally joined the KPD, returning to Romania in 1932 after being called home by his father, again without completing his studies. He worked in his father's firm but quit following an argument. For a time, he gave private German lessons, then found a position as a clerk. By his own account, he embezzled significant sums while on the job, allowing him to play roulette at the Sinaia Casino. He became a regular client there after 1937, and also used party funds to gamble. At the same time, he helped fund the extravagant lifestyles of party members, including Foriș, Bela Breiner, Teohari Georgescu and Iosif Chișinevschi, who frequently asked him for loans that would finance see houses, cars, furniture and travel.

Between 1932 and 1935, he lived in a single room with his wife and daughter, sharing meals with his in-laws. The same room hosted communist meetings organized by Pătrășcanu. Also during this period, he persuaded his wife to enact a fantasy to which he had masturbated: of her having sexual intercourse with other men. First, a barber visited four times, followed by a mechanic once and the brother of her brother-in-law, also once. During each session, Koffler would watch unseen and masturbate, and would then have intercourse with his wife after the other man left.

He was an occasional courier to Prague, where the PCdR's political office was located. He worked with members of the party secretariat, Ana Pauker, Nicolae Goldberger and Șmil Marcovici. He belonged to the agitprop section then led by Marcel Pauker. He was part of the editing committee of the clandestine gazette Scînteia, to which he was a frequent contributor, along with Solomon Schein, Ion Popescu-Puțuri and Ștefan Voicu. A skilled conspirator, Koffler, despite having close relations with the PCdR's leaders for years, never drew the attention of the Siguranța, which never suspected him of being a communist or anything but a casual acquaintance of the known party leaders. In 1943, when a lover of his was arrested, he too was detained when his name was found on a report in her purse. The police assumed he was not involved in subversive activities; an investigation turned up nothing, and neither was his name found in the files, so he was released the next day.

=== Financial involvement ===
The seminal event within the PCdR during this period was the June 1935 arrest of three leading members: Ana Pauker, Marcovici and Dimităr Ganev, denounced by a fourth, Ion Zelea Pîrgaru, with whom Koffler was in touch. The following year saw the arrest of Goldberger and of Constantin Pîrvulescu, also contacts of Koffler's. In 1936, he set up the party's finance committee (CCF), with his role being to collect funds, and held this post until September 1944, when he was dismissed. For eight years, a remarkably stable record in the communist underground, his assistants included Emil Calmanovici, Jacques Berman, Emil Herstein and Egon Weigl, all Jews of bourgeois origin who had studied abroad.

The committee came into being as Joseph Stalin lost interest in the Comintern and largely left the various communist parties to raise their own revenues, while at the same time, supply routes from Moscow to Bucharest were becoming ever more uncertain in the face of Nazi Germany's rise and tightened security along the Dniester River. It helped keep the party alive, funding safe houses, salaries, overhead, aid to several hundred prisoners and their families, lawyers and bribes for judges, policemen, prison wardens and guards. Nevertheless, the Comintern was critical of its involvement in business affairs, with Wilhelm Pieck cautioning against bourgeois financiers influencing the party's policies. In 1942, the party raised 17.4 million lei, a sum that would rise to almost 30 million in 1943 and 46 million in 1944, until the August coup that ushered in the party's legalization. Most of the funds came from Jewish industrialists, with other money given by pro-English figures or businessmen who expected an Allied victory in the ongoing World War II.

In 1941, he became the closest collaborator of party leader Ștefan Foriș. In late 1942, he became involved with the communist-affiliated Union of Patriots. In 1943, he helped launch România Liberă newspaper.

=== Downfall and execution ===
Koffler was arrested in December 1949, together with other former members of the CCF. Stelian Tănase suggests four reasons why he ended up being executed. First, because he was the closest collaborator of Foriș, already killed in prison, and had thus been an accomplice of a man publicly accused of treason and collaboration with the Siguranța. The suspicions of collaboration were bolstered by communist fellow-traveler Petru Groza, who would charge that his December 1943 arrest involved Koffler as a police provocateur. Despite his relative obscurity, he was thus ensnared in the trial being prepared for Pătrășcanu, another rival of Gheorghiu-Dej's. Second, because Koffler was a highly inconvenient witness to the bitter factional struggles for control of the party that took place from 1940 to 1944, and stood in the way of the eventual victor, Gheorghe Gheorghiu-Dej, who wished to impose his own version of events on official history.

Third, because as head of the CCF, he knew precisely the source of party funds and their destination, which included some of the most prominent PCR leaders. Fourth, because Gheorghiu-Dej wanted revenge, personally ordering a harsh interrogation regime that, according to a witness speaking in 1967, included an officer pulling out over a third of his white hair during one session. Tortured, psychologically pressured and blackmailed, he suffered a heart attack. Once he returned to prison, he was severely beaten upon the orders of Interior Minister Alexandru Drăghici, whose instructions came from Gheorghiu-Dej. Eventually, he began to appear insane, with some doctors believing he was dissimulating in order to avoid the need to incriminate other party members, while others thought he had truly become schizophrenic under torture. He retracted his earlier admission of guilt and steadfastly declared himself innocent, which pushed Gheorghiu-Dej to opt for his execution, as opposed to the case of Bellu Zilber, who saved his life by cooperating. Koffler was tried for crimes against peace and high treason in April 1954. He was sentenced to death and, aged 52, shot in the back of the neck at 3 a.m. on the 17th, the same night Pătrășcanu was executed, at Jilava Prison.
