= Eugen Rozvan =

Hungarian-born Romanian communist activist and lawyer

- Rozvány Jenő
- Born: December 18, 1878; Nagyszalonta, Austria-Hungary (now Salonta, Romania)
- Died: June 16, 1938 (aged 59); Soviet Union
- Cause of death: Execution
- Education: University of Budapest; University of Berlin
- Occupations: Activist, lawyer, and historian
- Political party: Social Democratic Party (Hungary); Socialist Party of Transylvania; Romanian Communist Party

Eugen Rozvan (Hungarian: Rozvány Jenő; Russian: Евгений Георгиевич Розвань, Evgeny Georgiyevich Rozvan; 28 December 1878 — 16 June 1938) was a Hungarian-born Romanian communist activist, lawyer, and Marxist historian, who settled in the Soviet Union late in his life and was executed during the Great Purge.

== Biography ==
=== Early activism ===
He was born in Nagyszalonta (Salonta), Transylvania (part of Austria-Hungary at the time), in a family of Aromanian origins. His father, György, was a lawyer and a historian, having fought as an officer during the Hungarian Revolution of 1848. Rozvan attended the University of Budapest, where he became a supporter of socialist ideals, being influenced by the ideas of Ervin Szabó. He continued his studies in law at the University of Berlin, and, after receiving his doctorate, returned to his homeland and enrolled in the Social Democratic Party (SZDP). In the following period he worked towards the organization of the movement in his native city and the neighbouring Nagyvárad (Oradea). He took a special interest in developing a socialist message for the peasants, proposing a democratic distribution of the land among smallholders, as well as for the national minorities, seeking to attract Romanian rural intellectuals to the socialist movement. To this end, he joined the Romanian section of the SZDP and initiated contacts with the Romanian National Party. In 1907, Rozvan was a delegate to the Stuttgart Congress of the Second International, while in 1908 he was elected in the leadership of Bihar County party chapter. A collaborator of Ady Endre, in the latter year Rozvan became a founding member of the Tomorrow literary society, and was elected a board member of the radical Social Sciences Society. He was also a familiar presence at the cultural conferences taking place in Nagyvárad; on one such occasion he met Nora Lemenyi, an early Romanian feminist and socialist, whom he would marry in 1912. That same year, the couple participated in the Extraordinary Congress of the Second International, held in Basel. Rozvan's contributions to the national and local socialist press brought him to the attention of the authorities, and consequently he was arrested several times on charges of offence against public order and violation of the press laws.

Rozvan was drafted as a lieutenant in the Austro-Hungarian Army during World War I, fighting on the Serbian Front before being captured in December 1914. Interned in southern Serbia, and, beginning with the summer of 1915, in Italy, he quickly learnt Italian and started contacts with the local socialist movement, which eventually led to his arrest. During his internment he also worked towards translating to Hungarian the Communist Manifesto and parts of Karl Marx's Capital. After the end of the war, the Romanian government pressed him to emigrate to Hungary, while the revolutionary Labour Council proclaimed in Oradea called on him to join their cause. Ultimately deciding on returning to his home region, he was unable to do that until August 1919, at a time the Romanian authorities had already suppressed the local workers' movement. Nevertheless, soon after his return he succeeded in regrouping the workers' and sympathetic peasants in the region of Oradea, organizing a major demonstration in spite of the officially proclaimed martial law.

=== Communist activism in Romania ===
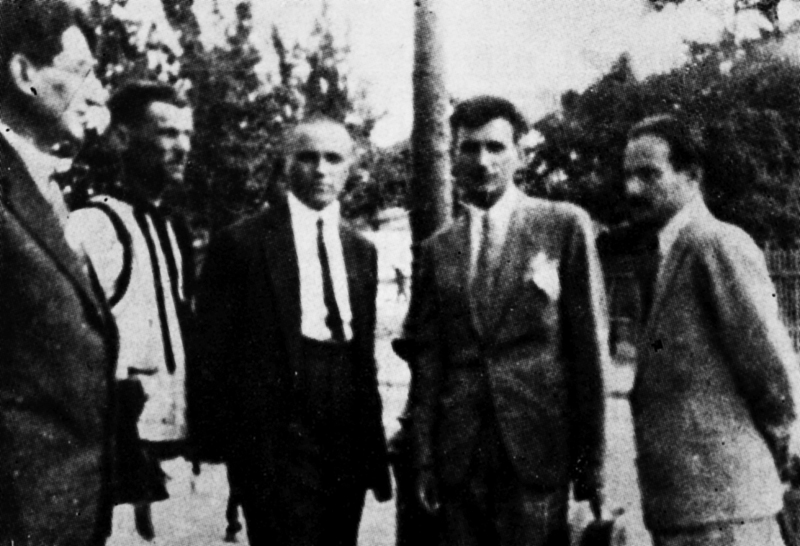
Rozvan (first from left) and the other deputies of the Peasant Workers' Bloc elected in the 1931 Romanian parliamentary elections.

After the Aster Revolution, he was offered high administrative positions by the National Romanian Party-dominated Directory Council of Transylvania, but refused to join it and gave his support to the far left. Following the former's success in rallying the Social Democrats to the cause of union with Romania, Rozvan became critical of his grouping, but eventually joined the Transylvanian section of the Socialist Party of Romania (PSR). Instead, his brother Ștefan became a National Party local leader, and his politics clashed with those of Eugen Rozvan to the point where, as prefect of Hunedoara County, he organized the repression of the Lupeni Strike of 1929.

Moving to Cluj, Rozvan had an important role in the re-establishment of the Hungarian and Romanian language socialist press. In February 1920 he was designated a secretary of the Socialist Party of Transylvania and Banat, and, from this position, he advocated the unification of the socialist organizations across the new territories of Romania and fought against the ethnic segregation of the workers' movement. In opposition to the right wing of the party, led by Iosif Jumanca and Ioan Flueraș, he was elected as one of the presidents of the August 1920 Cluj Congress of the party, supporting its merger into a national organization, as well as the affiliation of the resulting party to the Third International. Furthermore, he was elected to the party's executive committee and designated, along with Flueraș, to serve on the party's delegation to Bolshevist Russia, in order to discuss the conditions of such affiliation. The other delegates were Gheorghe Cristescu, David Fabian, Constantin Popovici, and Alexandru Dobrogeanu-Gherea. With Rozvan's agreement and the consent of other delegates, Flueraș and Iosif Jumanca were expelled following pressures from Grigory Zinoviev and Christian Rakovsky, due to their wartime support for nationalism and objections raised to Comintern guidelines.

After the right wing of the party defected in early 1921, Rozvan, appointed a member of the PSR's executive committee, took steps towards maintaining the party's influence among the workers of Transylvania. On May 6, 1921, he was elected president of the last regional socialist Congress for Tranyslvania and Banat, which he had helped organize, and presented the party's report on the relation with the trade union. Later that month, on May 8, he was a delegate from Brașov to the PS Congress that decided in favor of creating a Communist Party (PCdR) around the group's Bolshevik faction. For the latter congress he collaborated with Tiron Albani on preparing the report on nationalities. On this occasion, Rozvan expressed his concerns that Cristescu had maintained a "minimalist position", and the two briefly engaged in a heated polemic. Furthermore, during the debates on the agrarian question, he supported an alliance between peasants and workers in order to finalize the "bourgeois-democratic" phase of the revolution, against the opinion of Cristescu and Elek Köblös, who considered the primary target of the party should be the dictatorship of the proletariat. The matter remained unsettled, as, in the middle of the discussion, Rozvan and all the PCdR notable members were arrested, being later implicated in the Dealul Spirii Trial (in connection with the violent actions of Max Goldstein). Most of the indicted were freed on July 4, 1922, through the amnesty ordered by King Ferdinand I.

Rozvan remained active inside the Communist Party, being part of its provisional Executive Committee, entrusted with re-organizing party chapters in Transylvania. Furthermore, he became the editor of the party's Hungarian language organ in Braşov, Világosság. At the Second Congress (Ploiești, October 1922) he drafted the reports on the national and the agrarian question. The latter reignited the debates of the founding congress, Rozvan's support of the 1921 land reform being condemned by Boris Stefanov, who considered land should be nationalized. Rozvan warned that the promotion of such ideas would alienate the peasants, however he remained a minority in the agrarian committee, and the finalization of the report was postponed for a later date. During the same congress, he was elected deputy member of its Central Committee.

During the following period he helped organize the party's umbrella group, the Peasant Workers' Bloc, in the region around Oradea (1926–1931). With Lucrețiu Pătrășcanu, Imre Aladar, and two others, he was elected to the Chamber of Deputies on Bloc lists (May 1931), however the mandates were nullified on government's request. It was during that time that he became critical of Comintern directives regarding the dissolution of Greater Romania, eventually coming into opposition with the PCdR leadership around Marcel Pauker, who accused him of "right-wing opportunism". In 1929, he was expelled from the party, without being notified of it, and his status remained uncertain for the following years.

=== Later life ===
Rozvan decided to clarify matters by presenting his cause to Soviet authorities, and fled to Moscow by illegally crossing the Soviet-Romanian border in Bessarabia. Readmitted to the PCdR in 1934, he was employed by Eugen Varga at the Lomonosov University Institute of the World Economy and the World Politics, becoming noted as a scholar of Italian fascism (the subject of his 1937 Ph.D. thesis, which was used as a textbook). In the opinion of Vladimir Tismăneanu, Rozvan's critique of fascism also alluded to the consequences of Stalinism inside the communist movement.

Rozvan became a victim of the Great Purge: arrested on December 16, 1937, he was officially sentenced to ten years in prison. He was, however, executed soon after, based on an unpublicized sentence.

For the following years, Rozvan's fate was the topic of investigations by Comintern leader Georgi Dimitrov, who called on the NKVD to account for his whereabouts. During De-Stalinization in the 1950s, he was rehabilitated inside the Soviet Union; the Romanian Communist regime followed suit only a decade later, in 1968, when Nicolae Ceaușescu used the questioning of previous policies to justify his own grip on power. In 1971, a biography of Rozvan was published in Communist Romania.
