= Dem I. Dobrescu =

Romanian politician

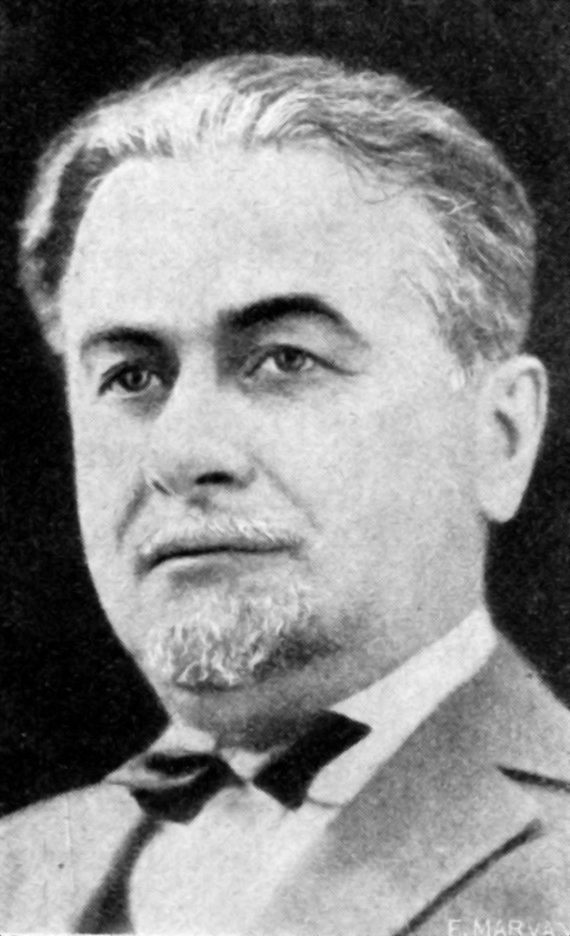
Dem I. Dobrescu

Dem I. Dobrescu (usual rendition of Demetru Ion Dobrescu; 1869 – 1948) was a Romanian left-wing politician who served as Mayor of Bucharest between February 1929 and January 1934.

== Biography ==
=== Early life ===
Born in Jilava to a Transylvanian family, he grew up in Văcărești in the outskirts of Bucharest. He studied at the Matei Basarab High School and then he studied law at the University of Bucharest, after which he moved to France, where he became a Doctor of Law after defending his thesis L'évolution de L'Idée de Droit in 1894. After returning to Romania, he worked as a judge at the Iași Tribunal and then a prosecutor in Ilfov County Dobrescu then joined the Bucharest bar and, after World War I, became its dean and later, the president of Lawyers' Union.

Alongside N. D. Cocea and others, he also defended Communist Party members during the 1922 Dealul Spirii Trial. In 1923, Dobrescu was part of the defense for Constantin Titel Petrescu, leader of the Federation of Romanian Socialist Parties, during a trial for alleged insults addressed to the Romanian Army; Petrescu was eventually acquitted. Earlier in the year, Dobrescu had joined Petrescu's Liga Drepturilor Omului (League for Human Rights), which voiced protests against measures taken by the National Liberal cabinet of Ion I. C. Brătianu; the League also included Constantin Rădulescu-Motru, Constantin Mille, Victor Eftimiu, Nicolae L. Lupu, Constantin Costa-Foru, Grigore Iunian, Radu D. Rosetti, and Virgil Madgearu.

=== Mayor of Bucharest ===
Dobrescu was a member of the Communal Council of the Sector III ("Blue") and, following 1926 local elections, he became the mayor of the sector as a candidate for the National Peasants' Party (PNȚ). Following the formation of a new PNȚ government, an internal struggle began in Bucharest over the membership and mayors of the sectors and of Bucharest. For the mayor's office, the main candidates were Dobrescu and Gheorghe Gheorghian.

After two months of struggles, on February 5, 1929, a royal decree was published, by which the councils were dissolved and, in their place, Bucharest was administered by an interim commission led by Dobrescu.

After winning, he declared the purpose of the office to be "not just administrative in character, but also social", claiming that "we worked 50 years for the center [of the city], we should work 5 years for the outskirts". Consequently, he created a series of non-partisan comitete cetățenești ("citizen committees"), which were to oversee the application of norms in areas such as health, building maintenance, street commerce, and public safety. In the context of the Great Depression, he took measures to ensure that the underprivileged were regularly fed through public expense.

He also soon began a series of major public works: paving most streets (with measures take to replace the many types of pavement in use with a single material); radical measures in electrification and the expansion of the water supply network; authorising the first buildings reflecting a modernist style; widening and straightening Calea Victoriei, as well as other major routes (with the reshaping of squares such as Piața Universității); sanitizing and embanking the Băneasa Lake, as well as other lakes and ponds in northern Bucharest.

Because of the large number of public works executed, he was nicknamed "the pickaxe mayor". In a speech, he said he wanted "to profit from the widespread unemployment" to carry out large public works, "to get rid of dirt roads and to bring civilization to the outskirts and suburban areas" of Bucharest.

Dobrescu also banned the then-widespread street peddling, making it mandatory that all sales transactions had to be made indoors.

In July 1931, following a conflict with the Ministry of Internal Affairs, he was suspended from office. However, the government soon reversed its decision following strong public reactions.

Although widely popular, Dobrescu's measures contributed, according to the newspaper Dimineața, to creating "unease — inside his party — unease on the outside". He eventually came into conflict with the Ion G. Duca National Liberal government and was removed from office 13 November 1933; the move caused a scandal, and Dobrescu was reinstated as mayor on 26 November, only to be deposed by the new Gheorghe Tătărescu cabinet (which had taken over following Duca's assassination by the fascist Iron Guard) on 18 January 1934.

=== Citizen Committees ===
Dobrescu's leftist convictions eventually brought him into conflict with the PNȚ: he left in December 1935 to establish his own political movement, which took the name of the popular institution he had helped create — the Citizen Committees. It remained a minor anti-fascist party, and disappeared in 1938, when King Carol II replaced all political forces with his National Renaissance Front.

== Legacy ==
His modernization of Bucharest received much praise. Novelist Liviu Rebreanu called him "the best mayor that the capital ever had", while N. D. Cocea said that "in 4 years, he did what other didn't do in 40 [years]". Nicolae Iorga said that "wherever you look in Bucharest: widened streets, open squares, open perspectives, creative westernisation, the name of Dimitrie Dobrescu comes to your lips".

== See also ==
- History of Bucharest
