= Alexander Danieliuk-Stefanski =

Polish communist activist and politician (1897–1937)

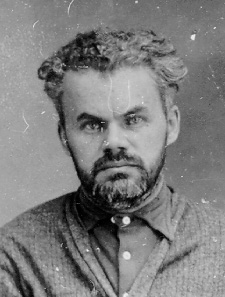
Aleksander Danieluk; mug shot by the NKVD (1937)

Alexander Danieliuk-Stefanski (also Stefański or Ștefanski; 30 November 1897, Warsaw – 21 August 1937, Moscow) was a Polish communist politician, active in Poland and in the Soviet Union. From 1931 to 1936, he oversaw the activities of Romanian communists in exile to the Soviet Union, and served as General Secretary of the Romanian Communist Party (PCdR). During the period, he was seconded by Elena Filipescu, who was also his lover.

== Names ==
Likely born as Aleksander Danieliuk, the activist changed his name to Stefański, a variant which he used during the time he was active in the Second Polish Republic. Occasionally referred to as Ștefanski by Romanian-language sources, he also used pseudonyms Gorn (or Horn), Edmund, Olek and Grigorescu. In Romanian historiography, he also known as Alexander Ștefanski-Gorn or Alexandru Ștefanski.

== Biography ==
Of probable Ukrainian ethnicity, Danieliuk-Stefanski was a member of the Russian Social Democratic Labor Party since 1915, taking part in the Russian Revolution of 1917 and becoming affiliated with the Bolshevik faction. A member of the Communist Party of Poland (KPP) in 1919 and a citizen of Poland, he was one of the Polish party's leading members during the late 1920s, representing it to the Comintern's Executive Committee fifth session. Becoming known as a supporter of Adolf Warski, who was being disgraced by Soviet leader Joseph Stalin, Danieliuk-Stefanski was stripped of his offices within the KPP and sent to work for the Comintern. Before 1931, he was present in Warsaw.

Around the time of the Romanian Communist Party's Fifth Congress in 1931, Béla Kun, who was at the time a leading Comintern figure directed the party to replace its entire leadership, including the general secretary Vitali Holostenco—appointing Stefanski, who was at the time still a member of the KPP, to head the Romanian party as the general secretary. The reshuffling of the PCdR's leadership structure also signified a boost in the political careers of, among others, Filipescu, Lucrețiu Pătrășcanu, Béla Breiner, Gheorghe Stoica, Nicolae Goldberger, and Vanda Nicolski, all of whom were nominated to the Central Committee.

This was an attempt to resolve factional disputes as well as assert Stalin's control over the local party. The core group of activists welcomed Stefanski's appointment as a positive step in the PCdR's history. Historian Vladimir Tismăneanu believes this acceptance of Stalinism on the part of the Romanian group marks a clear break with the legacy of the Socialist Party of Romania, from which the PCdR had emerged during the 1920s. Because of the party's illegality forced the leadership underground, Stefanski and his politburo actually directed the PCdR from exile in Berlin. However, the Fifth Congress also brought important changes in Romania, where an internal faction came to emerge under the supervision of Gheorghe Gheorghiu-Dej, future leader of Communist Romania.

The PCdR's representative to the thirteenth Executive Comintern Committee session, Stefanski barely spoke Romanian but, assisted by his lover Filipescu, played an important role in developing the "popular front" platform that allowed the PCdR to help instigate the Grivița Strike of 1933. At the time, under the pseudonym Maria Ciobanu, Filipescu was the Deputy General Secretary.

Stefanski was deposed by Stalin and the Comintern in 1936, after a new move to ensure the PCdR's adherence to their policies, being succeeded by Boris Stefanov. He was executed in the Soviet Union, a victim of the Great Purge. Several of his close Romanian allies were also killed during those years, with notable exceptions such as Pătrășcanu and Vanda Nicolski. The former rose to preeminence in Romania after 1944, while the latter became a collaborator of PCdR activist Ana Pauker during World War II.

Alexander Stefanski was rehabilitated in the People's Republic of Poland in 1955.

== Notes ==
Party political offices
Preceded by Vitali Holostenco	General secretary of the Romanian Communist Party; 1931–1936	Succeeded by Boris Stefanov
