= Boris Stefanov =

Romanian politician (1883–1969)

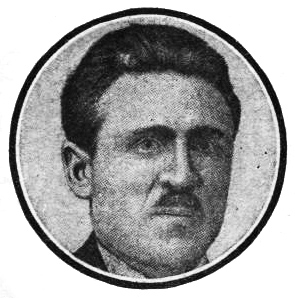

Member of the Grand National Assembly of Bulgaria
- In office 7 November 1946 – 21 October 1949

General Secretary of the Romanian Communist Party
- In office 1934–1940
- Preceded by: Alexander Danieliuk-Stefanski
- Succeeded by: Bela Breiner

Personal details
- Born: 8 October 1883 Kotel, Bulgaria
- Died: 11 October 1969 (aged 86) Sofia, Bulgarian People's Republic
- Cause of death: Car accident
- Party: Communist Party of Romania (1921-1945)
- Other political affiliations: Bulgarian Communist Party (1945-1969); Socialist Party of Romania (1918-1921); Social Democratic Party of Romania (1913-1918); Narrow Socialists (1904-1913)

Boris Stefanov Mateev (also known as Boris Ștefanov, Ivan Draganov or Dragu; Bulgarian: Борис Стефанов Матеев, Boris Stefanov Mateev; 8 October 1883 – 11 October 1969) was a Romanian and Bulgarian communist politician, who served as general secretary of the Romanian Communist Party (PCR or PCdR) from December 1934 to December 1940.

== Biography ==
=== Early life and activism ===
Stefanov was born into a wealthy landowning family in Kotel, Bulgaria. After the fire of Kotel of 1894, his family moved to Tsar Boris, Southern Dobrudja. After finishing high school in Varna he worked as a teacher, and between 1903 and 1905 he was drafted, serving in the Sofia Fortress Battalion, rising to the rank of lieutenant. Stefanov was introduced to socialist ideas at an early age by his sister Anna, secretary of the Varna organization of the Bulgarian Workers' Social Democratic Party (BRSDP) and delegate to the party's congress in 1903. Around the turn of the century, Boris, along with his sister and Georgi Bakalov, was part of a group smuggling illegal literature to Russia. In 1904 he made an application for membership in the "Narrow Socialists", the radical wing that emerged from the BRSDP split in the previous year.

During the Balkan Wars, he commanded an artillery battery on the Black Sea coast, near Varna. The Treaty of Bucharest, which concluded the wars in 1913, awarded Stefanov's home village, along with all Southern Dobruja, to Romania. Consequently, he decided to remain in his home region. With the help of socialist activist Christian Rakovsky, allegedly a relative, he joined the Social Democratic Party of Romania (PSD) in September 1913, taking part in its activities and collaborating with its press. During this period, his views were strongly influenced by the theory of "Neo-serfdom" developed by Romanian socialist patriarch Constantin Dobrogeanu-Gherea. Stefanov also continued to collaborate with the various socialist groups across the border (the "Narrows", the "Broad Socialists" and the Bulgarian Agrarian National Union). After the First World War erupted, he supported the pacifist stance of PSD; nevertheless, he was mobilized as infantry lieutenant in the Romanian Army once Romania joined the war in 1916. Due to his continued socialist propaganda among the soldiers, he was moved around several units, and ultimately interned.

Despite his Bulgarian origin, he spoke fluent Romanian. Stefanov allegedly engaged in activities for regional self-determination (see Dobrujan Revolutionary Organisation). He reportedly went into bankruptcy, and had to renounce much of his inheritance.

Having also joined the Socialist Party of Romania (PS), Stefanov became a successful candidate for Parliament, but, together with Gheorghe Cristescu and Alexandru Dobrogeanu-Gherea, he was not validated into office. He later became critical of the PS's moderate wing, and supported a Bolshevik program. At the time, he began campaigning for a land reform, arguing that the one planned by the Alexandru Averescu government and carried out by Ion I. C. Brătianu was far from sufficient. As a member in the General Council of the PS, Stefanov took part in the drafting of the manifesto that initiated the general strike of 1920. As a result, he was imprisoned in Jilava under the accusation of communism. While the arrest prevented him from participating at the PCR's founding Congress, he fully endorsed its decisions.

Indicted in the Dealul Spirii Trial and subject to an amnesty, Stefanov was elected to the General Council of the Party at its second Congress of 1922, also leading the Congress' agrarian commission. During the same year, he represented the minor faction in the Chamber of Deputies and was its envoy to the Comintern.

=== Stefanov and Romanian Communism ===
Although, like Cristescu, he was criticized by the Comintern for his allegedly minimalist outlook, he rose to the leadership of the PCR soon after the party was outlawed in 1924, and was known at the time under various pseudonyms (including Popescu, Draganov, and Dragu). In the third party Congress he was elected into the Political Bureau of the Central Committee. After many party activists, including the entire Politburo, took refuge to the Soviet Union, Stefanov stood as leader of the local Secretariat (together with Pavel Tcacenko). Sentenced in absentia to 10 years of prison in 1925, he was only apprehended in August 1926, after a Siguranța Statului crackdown, Stefanov was among those exposed after authorities pressured one of his comrades to hand out the names of all PCR leaders. Supported by the International Red Aid with interventions from Marcel Pauker (the French lawyer, Maurice Juncker, solicited, was forbidden to appear before the court by the Romanian authorities and expelled from Romania, he was nonetheless sentenced to 8 years for treason during a trial he faced in Cluj (the other person indicted, Vasile Luca, was acquitted) Stefanov served his sentence in Jilava, Văcărești, Doftana, Brașov and Aiud, and was set free in August 1933.

In February 1934, Stefanov left Romania for the Soviet Union together with his family, joining the apparatus of the Comintern. He led the Romanian delegation to the Fifth and Seventh Comintern World Congresses, after the formation of Popular Fronts was decided by Joseph Stalin; despite his foreign origin, he was perceived as a local member of the PCR, and became general secretary in December 1934, with the deposition of Alexander Stefanski (part of a Soviet-endorsed move allowing more autonomy to the Romanian section). At the Seventh Congress he was also elected a member in the Executive Committee of the Communist International, entering its presidium, where he remained until August 1941. Subsequently, Stefanov engaged in a campaign against alleged Trotskyists, mirroring Soviet measures that led to the Great Purge; a committed Stalinist, he accused both Elena Filipescu and Marcel Pauker of having sided with Leon Trotsky. Historian Ilarion Țiu states that Stefanov only left for Moscow in 1938, and that he was himself under suspicion from Soviet overseers.

=== Exile and later polemics ===
The actual leadership of the PCR inside Romania was taken over by Bela Breiner from 1938 until the latter's death in March 1940. Stefanov was ultimately removed from the party's leadership in December 1940, when Ștefan Foriș was appointed secretary general. Stefanov was a friend of Georgi Dimitrov, who Țiu credits with having rescued him from an almost certain doom after 1938. During World War II, his son, Asen Draganov, died while fighting the Germans as part of Dmitry Medvedev's partisan detachment.

Stefanov returned to Bulgaria in 1945, being elected in the country's National Assembly and serving as plenipotentiary of the Bulgarian Communist Party's Central Committee in the region of Dobruja. He spent the last decades of his life living in Sofia, Bulgaria.

In subsequent periods, Stefanov's image and status remained the subject of allegations inside Communist Romania. In 1961 he was denounced during a Plenum of the Central Committee of the PCR, which accused him of having been "divorced from the working class", of having introduced the theory of "neo-serfdom" (see Constantin Dobrogeanu-Gherea), as well as of having advocated a "liquidationist" policy of a united front with bourgeois parties in 1927. High-ranking Communist activist Valter Roman, who had been himself disgraced and rehabilitated by Gheorghe Gheorghiu-Dej, spoke out against former Communist politicians who had been purged at various stages, Stefanov included; he was interrupted by Petre Borilă, who notably added a claim that Stefanov believed Nazi Germany would evolve towards a socialist economy after the Molotov–Ribbentrop Pact.

On his 80th birthday in 1963, the Bulgarian Communist government awarded Stefanov the country's top honour, the Order of Georgi Dimitrov. The award was viewed as a deliberate attempt to irritate Romania's leadership, and a sign of cooling relations between the PCR and the Bulgarian Communist Party. During the later part of his life, Stefanov collaborated with several Bulgarian newspapers and magazines, and also participated in friendship committees seeking to strengthen Bulgaria's relation with Romania, the Soviet Union, and Yugoslavia. He died in a car accident in October 1969. On the occasion of his 100th anniversary, in 1983, a bronze bust dedicated to Stefanov was unveiled in the city park of Tolbukhin.

Party political offices
Preceded by Alexander Stefanski	General secretary of the Romanian Communist Party; 1936–1940	Succeeded by Ştefan Foriş
