= Vitali Holostenco =

Romanian and Soviet communist politician (c. 1900-1937)

Vitali Holostenco or Holostenko (Ukrainian: Віталій Холостенко, Vitaliy Kholostenko; c. 1900, Izmail, Russian Empire– 17 December 1937) was a Romanian and Soviet communist politician. He used several pseudonyms, among which were Barbu and Petrulescu.

== Early life ==
Born in Izmail, Bessarabia Governorate in the Russian Empire (in present-day Odessa Oblast, Ukraine), he was a student in Bucharest during the 1920s. Holostenco joined the Socialist Party of Romania and was one of the members to vote for its transformation into the Socialist-Communist Party (future Romanian Communist Party, PCdR) in May 1921. He was immediately arrested alongside the new formation's leadership, and faced prosecution in the Dealul Spirii Trial, being detained in Iași for the following year.

Upon his release, he fled to the Soviet Union, becoming the protégé of Christian Rakovsky, and climbed in the hierarchy of the Communist Party of Ukraine. His return to Romania is still mysterious - in 1927, Holostenco was already general secretary of the Romanian party. The emerging Soviet leader Joseph Stalin had taken care to tighten his grip on the select group of Romanian leaders, trusting Vitali Holostenco to enforce the Comintern thesis on the Romanian state's heterogeneous character (with the need for the liberation of oppressed people it ruled over). Reaction to this goal had already provoked a crisis within the Party: in 1924, Gheorghe Cristescu had left the PCdR without its leadership after being expelled for refusing to take the directives.

== Political role ==
Holostenco could not finish the assignment of unifying the Romanian prison faction (most of its members either were serving or had been serving time in jail on Romanian soil) with the group inside the Soviet Union (the Muscovite faction). More attached to the latter, he faced the virulent opposition of Marcel Pauker. Pauker had been involved in countless political battles inside Romania, and aimed at being the next general secretary. Stalin decided to reject both options, and called Marcel Pauker to the Soviet Union (assigning him mundane tasks), while replacing Holostenco with Alexander Stefanski.

Holostenco was recalled in 1931, and was executed during the Great Purges. The charges brought against him are not known, but several things would have made Holostenco an unlikely survivor. Beside his association with Rakovsky (probably creating the suspicion that he was a supporter of the Left Opposition), he had become of no use to Stalin after the Popular Front doctrine re-oriented the Comintern.

Party political offices
Preceded by Elek Köblös	General secretary of the Romanian Communist Party; 1927–1931	Succeeded by Alexander Stefanski
