= Elek Köblös =

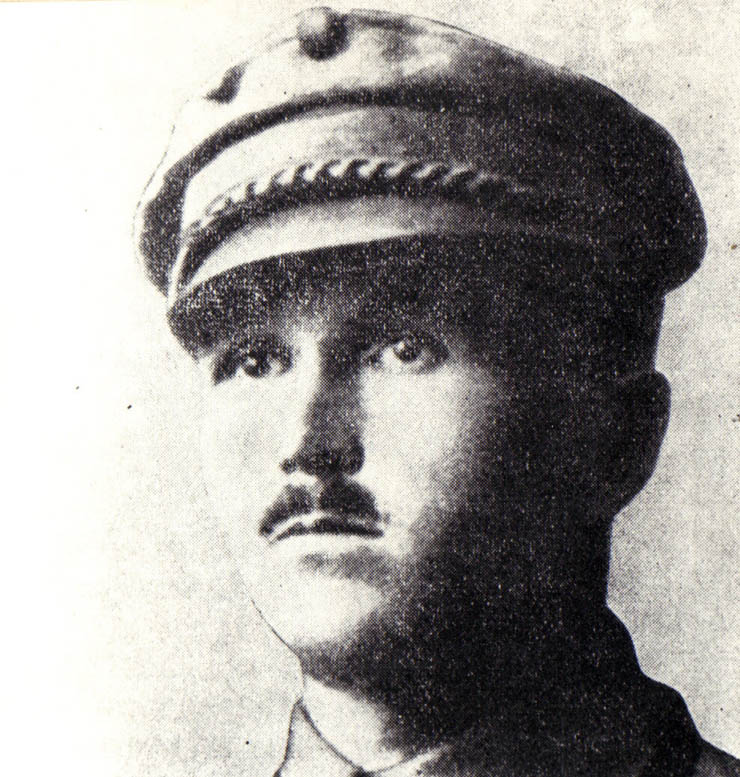

General secretary of the Romanian Communist Party
- In office 1924–1927
- Preceded by: Gheorghe Cristescu
- Succeeded by: Vitali Holostenco

Personal details
- Born: May 12, 1887 Sáromberke, Kingdom of Hungary, Austria-Hungary
- Died: October 9, 1938 (aged 51) Moscow, Soviet Union
- Party: Socialist Party of Romania; Communist Party of Romania
- Nickname(s): Balthazar; Bădulescu; Dănilă

Elek Köblös (Russian: Элек Балтазарович Кёблёш, romanized: Elek Baltazarovich Kyoblyosh; 12 May 1887 – 9 October 1938) was an Austro-Hungarian-born Hungarian and Romanian communist activist and political leader. He was also known by the pseudonyms Balthazar, Bădulescu, and Dănilă. He served as general secretary of the Romanian Communist Party from 1924 to 1927 and was executed in the Soviet Union during the Great Purge.

== Biography ==
=== Early years ===
Köblös was born on 12 May 1887 into an ethnic Hungarian family in Sáromberke (present-day Dumbrăvioara, part of Ernei, Mureș County) in Transylvania. After completing elementary school in his native village, he continued his studies in Nagyenyed (today Aiud, Romania). He dropped out of school after four years, and started as an apprentice carpenter in Marosvásárhely (today Târgu Mureș).

As a carpenter, Köblös became active in the trade union movement and was won over to the ideas of revolutionary socialism. He took part in revolutionary activities in the Austro-Hungarian empire at the end of 1918, fighting against Romanian troops in defense of the Hungarian Soviet Republic, during the Hungarian–Romanian War. When Transylvania was incorporated into the Kingdom of Romania in 1920, Köblös became a Romanian citizen.

=== Political career ===
Köblös was a delegate to the May 1921 Congress of the Socialist Party of Romania, where supporters of the Russian October Revolution established the "Socialist-Communist Party" (soon renamed the Romanian Communist Party). Köblös was arrested at the closing of the Congress on 12 May 1921 and implicated in the Dealul Spirii Trial before being released in 1922.

In October 1922, at the 2nd Congress of the Communist Party held at Ploiești, Köblös was elected member of the Central Committee, together with Gheorghe Cristescu, Alexandru Dobrogeanu-Gherea, Lucrețiu Pătrășcanu, Marcel Pauker, Eugen Rozvan, and Boris Stefanov. Köblös headed the party's trade union section, with particular attention given to the woodworkers' union, of which he was the head.

In 1924, at the 3rd Congress held in Vienna, Köblös was appointed general secretary of the Romanian Communist Party, replacing the disillusioned Gheorghe Cristescu. He continued in this position until 1927. During this period, Köblös came into conflict with Marcel Pauker.

In the summer of 1924, Köblös travelled to the Soviet Union, where he attended the 4th World Congress of the Communist International on behalf of the Romanian party.

Köblös returned to Romania in 1925, where he headed a secret meeting of the party Central Committee in July, which decided to use the existing workers' and peasants' bloc as a legal outlet for Communist Party activity. This effort at legal work proved unsuccessful, however, and Köblös was forced to flee the country in the fall of 1925. He remained in exile until 1927, staying in Vienna and the Soviet Union as a part of the Romanian Communist Central Committee in exile.

In 1927, Köblös returned to Romania, where he once again came under police scrutiny. He hastily fled to Czechoslovakia but was arrested at Košice by Czechoslovak authorities and held for possible extradition to Romania. A major press campaign was launched on Köblös' behalf, with many international leftist activists, including French novelist Henri Barbusse, successfully lobbying the Prague authorities not to extradite Köblös to Romania. Köblös was finally allowed to leave for the Soviet Union.

In June 1928, Köblös attended the 4th Congress of the Romanian Communist Party, held in Kharkov in Ukraine. Köblös came under severe criticism at that party gathering for perceived errors in the Romanian party's political line and despite engaging in public self-criticism for these alleged shortcomings, Köblös was not re-elected to the party's Central Committee.

In December 1929, the Communist Party of the Soviet Union and the Comintern once again condemned the political activity of Köblös and he was forbidden to take part in any further work of the Romanian Communist Party. Instead, Köblös returned to carpentry in an aviation factory.

=== Arrest and execution ===
Köblös continued to make his home in the Soviet Union. He ran afoul of the secret police during the Great Purge of 1937, when he was arrested, accused of espionage. He was executed on 9 October 1938, most likely in the Lubyanka Prison, Moscow.

He was posthumously rehabilitated in 1968, during Nicolae Ceaușescu's move to establish his legitimacy in Communist Romania.

== Additional sources ==
- Vladimir Tismăneanu, Fantoma lui Gheorghiu-Dej, Editura Univers, Bucharest, 1995
- Dosarele Istoriei, 10/1998

Party political offices
Preceded by Gheorghe Cristescu	General secretary of the Romanian Communist Party; 1924–1927	Succeeded by Vitali Holostenco
