= Béla Breiner =

Romanian communist activist and politician (1896–1940)

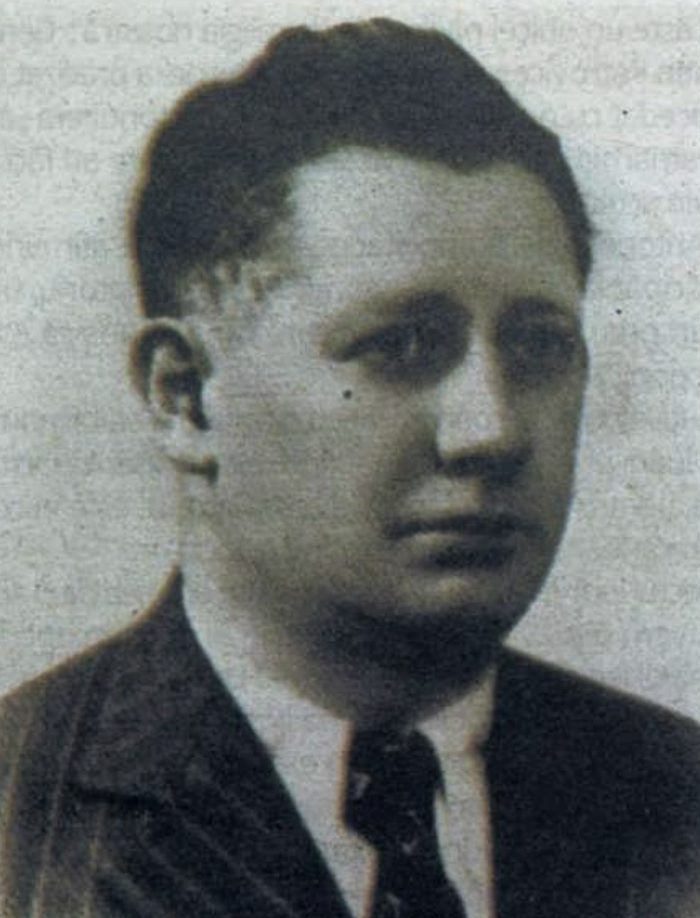
- Breiner c. 1940

General Secretary of the Romanian Communist Party
- (Acting)
- In office 1939 – 10 March 1940
- Preceded by: Boris Stefanov
- Succeeded by: Ștefan Foriș

Personal details
- Born: 13 February 1896 Nagyvárad (Oradea), Transleithania, Austria-Hungary
- Died: 10 March 1940 (aged 44) Bucharest, Kingdom of Romania
- Other political affiliations: Social Democratic Party of Hungary (1912–1919); Socialist Party of Romania (c. 1920)
- Spouse: Piroska (Paraschiva) Abraham
- Children: 1
- Occupation: Metallurgist, propagandist, labor organizer
- Nickname: Orlov

Military service
- Allegiance: Austria-Hungary; Soviet Hungary
- Branch/service: Hungarian Landwehr
- Battles/wars: World War I Hungarian–Romanian War

Béla Breiner, also rendered as Bela Brainer (13 February 1896 – 10 March 1940), was an Austro-Hungarian-born communist activist, who served as acting general secretary of the Romanian Communist Party (PCR or PCdR) during the early stages of World War II. The son of a Hungarian Jewish and working-class family, he was child laborer who acquired skills in metallurgy, moving from his native Nagyvárad (Oradea) to Budapest. Breiner was also involved in the labor unrest, and joined the Social Democratic Party of Hungary at age sixteen. His contribution in the field of socialist propaganda made him a political suspect by the time of World War I, and he was punished with conscription into the Hungarian Landwehr—though he continued to proselytize among his fellow soldiers. Breiner was enthusiastic about the Aster Revolution, and went on to fight for the Hungarian Soviet Republic, resulting in his brief imprisonment by the Romanian Land Forces during the expedition of 1919.

Breiner settled in Greater Romania after the Hungarian defeat, and involved himself in organizing the general strike of 1920. He was then a founding member of the PCR, opting to preserve his membership after the group had been outlawed, and then emerging as its regional head in Crișana. In 1926, shortly after joining the central committee, he was arrested by the Romanian authorities, and reportedly tortured. A tribunal sentenced him to a five-years term in prison, which he served at Doftana. Upon release, he traveled clandestinely into the Soviet Union, where he participated in the PCR's fifth congress—which confirmed his own induction by the party secretariat, as well as his role in editing Scînteia, the underground newspaper. While engaged with masterminding the strike action at Grivița, he was again picked up by the Romanian authorities, who had uncovered a Comintern network that was sponsoring the PCR. Breiner benefited from a more lenient regime, at Văcărești, and was thereafter involved in a campaign to improve prison conditions across the country.

The PCR had by then been largely neutralized, and had effectively lost its general secretary, Boris Stefanov, who had exiled himself in Soviet territory. From 1937, Breiner served as the senior member of a triumvirate party leadership, alongside Ștefan Foriș and Ilie Pintilie; he himself spent most of 1938 in Moscow, seeking (and finally obtaining) recognition from the Comintern. While there, he began contributing denunciations of his colleagues, which were used as justification for their extermination in the Great Purge. Himself disgraced by Soviet political realignments, Stefanov ultimately abandoned his position as general secretary in 1939, leaving Breiner to take over in a provisional capacity. He was by then seriously ill with stomach cancer, which ultimately killed him March 1940. Political homages, muted by political circumstances during his cremation ceremony, were taken up publicly by the communist regime between 1948 and 1989. Several landmarks were named after him during that interval, when he was also publicly celebrated as a working-class hero.

== Biography ==
=== Early life ===
Breiner was born on 13 February 1896 as a subject of the Hungarian Crown, in Nagyvárad (Oradea). Though sometimes described as having Hungarian ethnicity, he was noted by researcher Eva Țuțui as one of several far-left activists who belonged to Nagyvárad's Hungarian Jewish community. Both his parents were destitute workers in the local industry; their union also produced another son, Ludovic. At the age of twelve, Béla began working in a factory, training himself as a lathe operator. He was treated with cruelty by his employers, and, by the age of fourteen, had contributed to several protests of trainees against the beatings they were receiving regularly. His first place of employment was Jakab Weinberger's factory, also in Nagyvárad. Upon being recognized as a journeyman at the age of sixteen, he could also join the trade union; shortly after, he also entered the Social Democratic Party of Hungary (MSZDP). He was immediately recognized for his skills as a propagandist.

During the earliest stages of World War I, Breiner was employed at one of the major metallurgical plants on Csepel, in southern Budapest, and was recognized by the local branch of the MSZDP as a reliable cadre. He is said to have actively opposed the war effort, resulting in his being arrested and sent to the front. He then served in the Hungarian Landwehr and saw action in the trenches—but also continued to be active as a socialist, helping diffuse his ideology among his army comrades. The latter activity intensified after the October Revolution. Breiner also supported the Aster Revolution, joining the effort to preserve the Hungarian People's Republic and its territorial claims. Upon its transformation into a Hungarian Soviet Republic, he actively resisted the Romanian military intervention: some sources indicate that he did so out of Nagyvárad, by organizing his fellow workers, while others suggest that he was taken prisoner by the Romanian Land Forces on the front lines—but that he then managed to escape.

Breiner's native city, renamed as "Oradea" or "Oradia Mare", was attached to Greater Romania. He made his way back to the region, and rejoined the labor movement. According to historian Gabriel Moisa, Breiner and Eugen Rozvan were the two main organizers of a Socialist Party branch in Oradea. In 1920, Breiner helped organize a general strike among Oradea workers, as part of the nation-wide labor conflict. He joined the PCR upon its creation as a legal party, in 1921, and was its main activist until October 1923, when Rozvan, returning from a tour of Transylvania, assumed the position of a local leader. Breiner opted to continue in PCR ranks when it was outlawed and repressed in 1924, and, by 1925, was its regional organizer in all of Crișana. In March 1926, during court proceedings involving almost 100 PCR defendants, Breiner was tried in absentia, and sentenced to a five-year term on charges of having "infiltrated" Romania as a foreign agent. He and his co-defendant Jenő Fülöp (also credited as Eugen Fuelop) allegedly fled Oradea before sentencing.

=== At Doftana ===
Ștefan Foriș, who attended a high-level PCR meeting in October 1926, reports that Breiner, also present there, was co-opted on the central committee during the proceedings. Still tasked with organizing the communist underground in Transylvania, and using his Oradea home for clandestine meetings, Breiner was ultimately arrested at Sibiu in early November 1926. Foriș claims that he had been "most certainly" betrayed by a suspected infiltrator, namely Willy Roth, and notes that his place on the central committee went to Petre Imbri. One of Breiner's official biographies claims that torturers were specially brought in from Bucharest, and that, despite being subjected to "barbaric" torments, "he never gave them any of his comrades' names". He was still tried for sedition, beginning in October 1927. At the time, the prosecution alleged that he and Fülöp had been sponsored by the Soviet Union with a "large sum of dollars". Through his lawyers Eugen Dunca and Ilariu Popescu, Breiner denied that this was true. The Sixth Army Corps in Cluj originally ruled that he should serve eight years behind bars, but Dunca and Popescu appealed for clemency, and had his sentence reduced this to the original five years.

Breiner served his time in Doftana—where he immediately connected with other communists and took care of their political education. His biographies suggest that he was tortured and otherwise mistreated, to the point where his general health was greatly affected. He was later freed, and could help organize the PCR's fifth congress, held inside the Soviet Union in 1931. Breiner traveled clandestinely to Moscow, where he used the pseudonym "Orlov". Once welcomed there in October 1931, he also helped eleven other delegates cross the border illegally—a twelfth delegate was prevented from leaving, his cover blown by his need to address a medical emergency. In 1932, Breiner was elected a member of the PCR central committee and secretariat. In this capacity, he took charge of editing Scînteia newspaper, and also helped instigate the protest movement that became the Grivița strike of 1933.

Before the strike had broken out, Breiner himself had been detained: in April 1932, he was picked up alongside fellow activist Pavel Bojan after a sting operation on Rozelor Street, Bucharest. In May, a mandate for his arrest was upheld by the Ilfov County tribunal, which followed up on accusations that he had circulated "subversive manifestos" alongside comrades Árpád Weiss and Moscu Parlacu. He was then sentenced to another three years behind bars. This was immediately after the authorities had captured Gustav Arnold, an agent of the Comintern, who had tried to launder 1.2 million lei as funds set aside for the PCR. The investigation had pointed to Breiner and Lucrețiu Pătrășcanu as Arnold's personal contacts in the communist underground. The case against him was made during a mass trial, where lawyer Paul Moscovici represented Breiner and his co-defendant Sara Tzan, as well as several communist bill-stickers; during the proceedings, Moscovici challenged testimonies according to which Breiner had met Arnold in Berlin.

=== Secretariat advancement ===
Again sent to Doftana, Breiner persuaded the prison guards to let him visit with new arrivals such as Bojan. He brought them food and ensured links between them and what he termed the "leadership of the inner-prison communist committee". In December, he was transferred to a more relaxed regime at the prison-hospital of Văcărești, bunking with Foriș and Gheorghe Gheorghiu-Dej. He was asked to appear as a witness at the Grivița strikers' trial, and used the opportunity to reestablish connections between the various inner-party groups. Together with Gheorghiu-Dej, he organized a clandestine meeting of the imprisoned communists. Released in May 1935, he appeared as a defense witness at the 1936 Craiova Trial, substantiating allegations of mistreatment and "terror" exercised against communist inmates. Foriș contends that the both of them helped obtain a more liberal regime at Doftana. With much of the party now arrested or self-exiled in Soviet territory, the Comintern intervened to depose the PCR secretariat; in May 1937, Breiner, alongside Foriș and Ilie Pintilie, received a mandate from Moscow to organize a new executive body.

Within this triumvirate, Breiner managed the clandestine regional networks, while the other two supervised legal activities by front organizations, including in the field of agitprop. A later deposition by the underground militant Remus Koffler suggests that Breiner took his financing from two local sponsors—Emil Calmanovici and Egon Weigl—, and that he often picked it up in person. From February to December 1938, at a time when the PCR had been affected by the Comintern's policies beyond "its usual disarray" and "lack of traction in society", Breiner was in Moscow, reporting on the PCR's activities. As noted by historian Cristina Diac, he provided mostly negative assessments of other activists, including many who had fled into the Soviet Union. Diac argues that such denunciations made Breiner complicit in the Great Purge, which decimated the Romanian communist colony in Moscow. Upon his return to Bucharest, he dedicated himself to opposing the authoritarian regime established around the National Renaissance Front (FRN), and also focused on anti-fascism. Under his influence, the PCR adopted resolutions which looked on the FRN as a softer adversary than the radical fascists of the Iron Guard. Breiner also described the communist platform as defending the "brilliant Soviet people" against the threat of a "criminal war" by its capitalist adversaries, while supporting the future dismemberment of Greater Romania as a way to liberate "oppressed nationalities" within the country's borders.

Still general secretary of the PCR at the time, Boris Stefanov had joined the exodus into the Soviet Union and never considered returning—leaving Breiner to replace him as provisional secretary of the rump party, acting out of various homes in Bucharest. Again seconded by Foriș and Pintilie, he planned a rescue operation which, if carried out, would have resulted in Gheorghiu-Dej escaping Doftana alongside other inmates; he also supervised the Union of Communist Youth, and, in June–July 1939, personally educated its cadres (including Nicolae Ceaușescu) at a secret location in Ploiești. Stefanov, whose status as general secretary was being reviewed by the Comintern, maintained some contacts with Breiner. The latter asked Stefanov to send him more funds, in order to improve party activity. The Comintern eventually recognized Breiner as provisional general secretary in 1939, after Stefanov had been condemned by the Soviet leadership (which had just ratified the Molotov–Ribbentrop Pact) for being too focused on defeating fascism.

=== Death ===
Once confirmed, Breiner began pressing the Comintern's Georgi Dimitrov to provide more money, and received 1,000 dollars as a result of his interventions. He preserved his position at the helm of the party to his death, which occurred on 10 March 1940. According to early reports, he was killed off by the after-effects of his imprisonment, with his place of death given as a PCR hiding spot, or "conspiratorial house". Later research indicates that he had in fact died of a stomach cancer at Bucharest's Colentina Hospital. During his final days, unsure about who would succeed him, he had selected Gavrilă Birtaș, who seemed to qualify for the position, and had sent him the PCR archive. His widow Piroska (also "Piri" or Paraschiva) Abraham was herself Jewish and communist, as were her two sisters—one of whom, Ecaterina, was married to communist militant Petre Borilă. Before her marriage, Piroska had received attention for putting out revolutionary propaganda addressed to the workers at Bucharest's Lemaître Factory; she had afterward served time in prison, where she is said to have been "beat[en] with rubber batons on her stomach". Béla was also survived by a three-year-old son, Andrei, who was raised by a grandmother somewhere in the countryside.

On 12 March, Breiner was cremated at a specialized facility called Cenușa. The ceremony, closely monitored by agents of the Siguranța, was attended by several PCR figures, by Breiner's brother Ludovic, as well as by some 50 workers. One of the latter was Ovidiu Șandru, who tried to hold an impromptu speech about Breiner's activity in the labor movement—he was forced to step down by the other participants, who feared that any revolutionary message would provoke a violent response from the authorities. An obituary appeared in Scînteia of 24 April, which asserted that "his memory lives on in our hearts, in the hearts of all party members, of all Romanian laborers."

Foriș was by then unofficially the interim secretary, and in May 1940 traveled to Moscow to obtain backing. The Comintern eventually became aware that the PCR had virtually no executive leadership during the great upheavals caused by the FRN's downfall and the emergence of a National Legionary State. It nominated Teohari Georgescu as the general secretary, but he declined, leaving Foriș to take up that position on a more official basis. Under Ion Antonescu's dictatorship, pressure was again mounted on hunting down some of the surviving communist cells. In April 1941, Piroska Breiner was arrested by the Siguranța, alongside Birtaș. They were singled out by Georgescu for having caved in under interrogation, contributing to the PCR's "spectacular downfall". As reported by communist militant and period witness Pál Veress, "only a hair's breadth separated [them] from being executed by Antonescu's firing squad".

== Legacy ==
Béla Breiner's contribution was revisited at various intervals by the Romanian communist regime, inaugurated in 1948 as a consequence of the Soviet occupation. The printing company of Sonnenfeld & Friedländer was nationalized in 1948, and immediately renamed after Breiner; the same occurred at the Volna Metallurgical Plant in Brașov and at the former Magyar–Belgian Textile Mill in Cluj. The Guban Shoe Factory in Timișoara joined the list of Breiner-named enterprises in 1952, after its capitalist owner had donated it to the Romanian state. In March 1949, Breiner was honored by the National Federation of Former Political Prisoners and Anti-fascist Deportees, which also inaugurated a "Breiner Corner" at Cenușa. The same year, Oradea's Vlahuță Street was changed to "Breiner Béla Street".

In March 1950, the Pioneer Organization formed a guard of honor at his urn, while Iosif Rangheț penned and published his biography. Also then, Andrei Breiner, who was a Pioneer at Bucharest's Lyceum No 7, published a piece honoring his father. Andrei claimed that Béla's example was inspiring him to do his best in school, but also that, during the few father–son moments in his early childhood, he had learned to love the Soviet Union and Joseph Stalin. His mother went on to marry Colonel Andrei "Bandi" Roman. In tandem, the party clamped down on Pătrășcanu and Remus Koffler, depicted as factionalists and made subjects of a show trial. During Securitate-led interrogations in August 1950, Koffler claimed that Breiner had always regarded Pătrășcanu as a dangerous Trotskyist and a habitual fornicator.

In later years, the communist press referred to Breiner Sr as a "shining example" and "fearless revolutionary militant". At the peak of Socialist Realism, his portrait was painted by Ștefan Szönyi. Apele Minerale Street in Bucharest's Dobroteasa mahala was renamed after the former party secretary in the 1950s. His ashes were eventually transported to a mausoleum in Liberty Park, and placed there alongside those of his colleagues in the communist movement. The trend was reversed after the Romanian Revolution of 1989: the Dobroteasa street was renamed after poet Ion Minulescu in January 1991, and a commemorative plaque was similarly removed. Andrei had by then become an engineer at the Chemical Engineering Institute in Bucharest, and working on a system to reduce waste in gas flares. In 1993, the family was still living in the city, in a formerly nationalized (and since litigated) house on Ion Mincu Street. At some point before 1999, the mausoleum was repurposed, and most remains, including Béla Breiner's, were handed to their respective families.
