= Gheorghe Cristescu =

Romanian politician and activist

General Secretary of the Romanian Communist Party
- Preceded by: Office established
- Succeeded by: Elek Köblös

Personal details
- Born: October 10, 1882 Copaciu, Giurgiu County, Romania
- Died: November 29, 1973 (aged 91) Timișoara, Romania
- Party: Romanian Social-Democratic Workers' Party; Social Democratic Party of Romania; Romanian Communist Party
- Children: Tita Cristescu
- Nickname(s): Plăpumarul; Omul cu lavaliera roșie

Gheorghe Cristescu (October 10, 1882, in Copaciu, Giurgiu County – November 29, 1973, in Timișoara) was a Romanian socialist and, for a part of his life, communist militant. Nicknamed "Plăpumarul" ("The Blanket Maker"), he is also occasionally referred to as "Omul cu lavaliera roșie" ("The man with the red four-in-hand necktie"), after the most notable of his accessories.

== Biography ==
=== Early activism ===
Born in Copaciu (at the time part of Ilfov County, presently in Giurgiu County), Cristescu trained as a blanket-maker and became the owner of a blanket-making shop. Active in socialist circles as early as 1898, he soon became a leading member of the Romanian Social-Democratic Workers' Party (up to 1899, when the Party disbanded). In 1900, he joined the leadership of the only surviving group of the Party, its Bucharest socialist circle, România Muncitoare (led by Christian Rakovsky).

Up until the creation of a Social Democratic Party of Romania (PSDR) on January 31, 1910, Cristescu was one of the leaders of the short-lived Socialist Union of Romania. Soon after a Romanian Railways employee named Stoenescu attempted to assassinate Premier Ion I. C. Brătianu on December 9, 1909, Cristescu, alongside other România Muncitoare activists (including I. C. Frimu and Dimitrie Marinescu), was arrested and interrogated on suspicion of having inspired the action. From 1910 to 1916, he was one of the PSDR's leaders; in 1908-1920, he was active in the trade union movement.

In 1916, the Party was banned for its activities in support of the Zimmerwald Conference at a time when Romania entered World War I on the Entente side. After the Central Powers offensive (see Romanian Campaign), he remained active in enemy-occupied Bucharest, and kept contacts with Social Democratic Party of Germany with the help of German soldiers who sympathized with the latter. In 1918, when Romanian authorities resumed control, Cristescu and many other leaders of the PSDR (Ecaterina Arbore, Constantin Popovici, Ilie Moscovici, and Constantin Titel Petrescu among them) were arrested on charges of collaboration.

The PSDR re-emerged in November 1918, as the Socialist Party of Romania, with Cristescu becoming one of its representatives in Parliament after the elections of 1919. In this capacity, he became noted in debates over the imprisonment of Mihai Gheorghiu Bujor, a Romanian citizen who had joined the Russian Red Army in Bessarabia during the October Revolution, and who had been tried for treason. Constantin Argetoianu, who negotiated a failed merger of the Socialist Party into the People's League in late 1919, stated that Moscovici voiced criticism of his party's far left wing, where, as Argetoianu formulated it, "the blanket-maker Cristescu and others were agitating".

In the early elections of 1920, Cristescu, together with Alexandru Dobrogeanu-Gherea and Boris Stefanov, was not validated into Parliament, despite having carried the popular vote. He was eventually confirmed for office.

=== Communism ===
Although he had originally voted against Vladimir Lenin's thesis as a delegate of the socialists to the Comintern World Congresses in Moscow (with Eugen Rozvan, Constantin Popovici, Ioan Flueraș, David Fabian, and Alexandru Dobrogeanu-Gherea), and despite Rozvan's suspicions that he had maintained a "minimalist position", he became more and more radical, supporting the transformation of the Party along Bolshevik lines, but showed himself opposed to control from Russia. In deliberations for the 1920 vote, he expressed his opposition to Comintern control over local parties, and subsequently met with Lenin. Cristescu later claimed that the Russian leader had accepted his dissent and had offered some "non-political" concessions to the Romanian socialists (the claim was partly backed by a testimony of Dobrogeanu-Gherea). During the Congress, both Cristescu and Dobrogeanu-Gherea were ridiculed at home by the non-communist press (their bourgeois status, in contrast to their activism, was highlighted in the nicknames "Cristescu-Blanket Maker" and "Dobrogeanu-Restaurant", the latter of which alluded to the business Dobrogeanu-Gherea was managing in Ploiești).

Cristescu led the faction that separated itself after the Party's Congress of 8–12 May 1921, and was elected as the first general secretary of the newly formed Socialist-Communist Party (soon to be the Romanian Communist Party). Those maximalists who had designated themselves as "communists" (including Gheorghe Cristescu) were arrested and indicted in the Dealul Spirii Trial: Romanian authorities attempted to connect them with Max Goldstein, a terrorist of uncertain affiliation who had detonated a bomb inside the Romanian Senate on December 8, 1920. The charge against the communists was based on their rejection of Greater Romania as a concept, and their commitment to "world revolution" and the Comintern, which raised suspicion that they were trying to overthrow the existing order through actions such as that of Goldstein. Constantin Argetoianu, Interior Minister in the second Alexandru Averescu cabinet and main instigator of the arrest, later admitted that his order lacked legal grounds, and stated that he had given Cristescu approval to hold congress with the knowledge that Comintern policies were to be submitted to a vote, thus causing the faction to incriminate itself.

Most of the accused were acquitted, an important reason for this being Cristescu's convincing testimony (alongside a hunger strike endured by most on the bench, as well as the absence of sufficient evidence). Cristescu depicted Goldstein as an anarchist, and declared most of the witnesses who had connected the terrorist with the Party to be spies for the Siguranța Statului secret police.

=== Dissidence ===
Cristescu started questioning his Party's policies after the decision taken by the Balkan Communist Federation during its 1923 Vienna Conference. The Federation had adopted the official Soviet policy recommending that Bessarabia, Bukovina, Transylvania, and Southern Dobruja (or all of Dobruja) be given the right to secede from Romania. Due to the ethnic composition of these regions, he could not accept that minorities be given self-determination (especially since this implied not autonomy or independence, but rather satisfaction of territorial demands that other nations had on Romania). Cristescu allegedly called for the party to revise its program in respect to these points, and thus resume legal activities.

Notably clashing with his nominal subordinate Marcel Pauker over such issues, he did all in his power to prevent the Party from adopting a clear point of view: when his attitude was investigated by the Balkan Communist Federation (1924), he had to resign his position, being excluded from the Party in 1926. According to Vladimir Tismăneanu, Cristescu's marginalization inside the Workers and Peasants' Bloc (created as an umbrella group for the outlawed Communist faction) was a major factor in his conflict with other activists.

=== 1930s, persecution, and rehabilitation ===
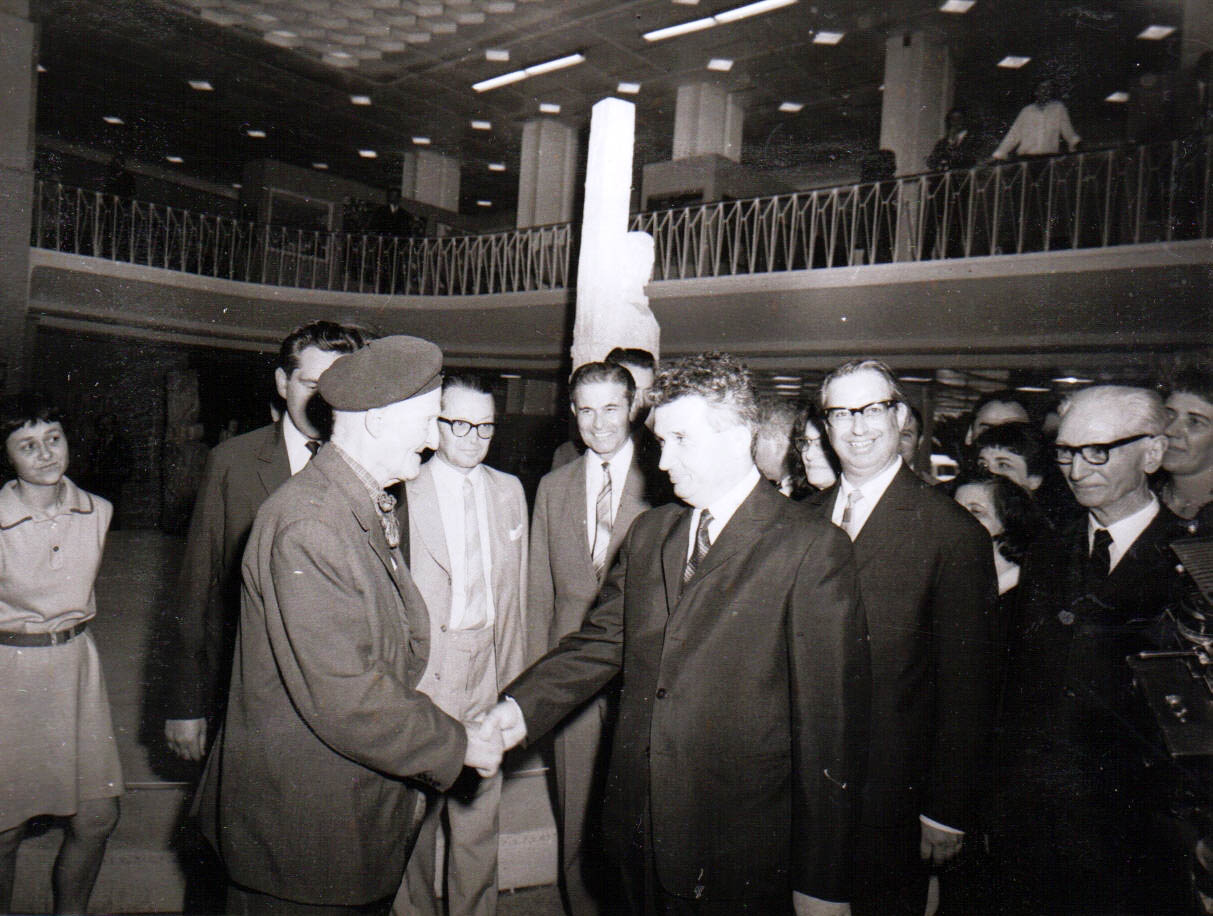
Cristescu meeting with Nicolae Ceaușescu in 1971, at the 50th anniversary of the creation of the Romanian Communist Party.

After creating his own minor group, the Socialist Party of Workers (later known as Independent Socialist Party), in 1928, Cristescu joined the minor Unitary Socialist Party in 1932 (a Marxist group led by Leon Ghelerter, Ștefan Voitec, and Constantin Popovici, it eventually dissolved itself under pressure from the Communist Party in 1944). He retired from politics in 1936.

His daughter Tita Cristescu, a former Miss Romania who had become the mistress of Liviu Ciulei (a well-known lawyer and father of the director Liviu Ciulei), died in mysterious circumstances in 1936. Ciulei, arrested on charges that he had poisoned her, was acquitted later in the same year. A theory in circulation indicates Maria Suciu, Tita's maid, as the killer.

During the first years of Communist Romania, he was severely persecuted for his political views, being arrested and imprisoned in the Danube–Black Sea Canal labour camps from 1950 to 1954. Released through the first amnesty of political prisoners (occurring very soon after Joseph Stalin's death), Cristescu spent his remaining years in relative anonymity. While his name was cleared by Nicolae Ceaușescu's rehabilitation policies, his uncomfortable opinions were censored and he was subject to Securitate surveillance until his death. Although occasionally hailed up as an anti-Comintern communist during a time when the Ceaușescu regime developed a nationalist discourse, Cristescu avoided being associated with the party he had helped to found.

== Notes ==
- (in Romanian) 110 ani de social-democrație în România ("110 Years of Social Democracy in Romania"), Social Democratic Party, the Ovidiu Șincai Social Democratic Institute, Bucharest, July 9, 2003
- Dosarele Istoriei, 10/1998
- Constantin Argetoianu, "Memorii" ("Memoirs"; fragment), in Magazin Istoric, March 1968
- Adrian Cioroianu, Pe umerii lui Marx. O introducere în istoria comunismului românesc ("On the Shoulders of Marx. An Incursion into the History of Romanian Communism"), Editura Curtea Veche, Bucharest, 2005
- Ion Constantinescu, "Dr. N. Lupu: "Dacă și d-ta ai fi fost bătut..."" ("Dr. N. Lupu: "If You Yourself Had Been Beaten...""), in Magazin Istoric, August 1971
- Florin Constantiniu, "Cristescu, Gheorghe", in Biographical Dictionary of European Labor Leaders, Greenwood Press, Oxford, 1995, p. 229
- (in Romanian) Cristina Diac,
  - "La "kilometrul 0" al comunismului românesc. "S-a terminat definitiv cu comunismul in România!"" ("At "Kilometer 0" in Romanian Communism. "Communism in Romania Is Definitely Over!""), in Jurnalul Național, October 6, 2004
  - "Delegații socialiști români la Moscova" ("Romanian Socialist Delegates in Moscow"), in Jurnalul Național, October 7, 2004
- Victor Frunză, Istoria stalinismului în România ("The History of Stalinism in Romania"), Humanitas, Bucharest, 1990
- Z. Ornea, Viața lui C. Stere ("The Life of C. Stere"), Vol. I, Cartea Românească, Bucharest, 1989
- (in Romanian) Stelian Tănase, "Procesul din Dealul Spirei" ("The Dealul Spirii Trial"), in Magazin Istoric
- (in Romanian) Traian Tandin, "Istoria crimelor pasionale: Cazul Liviu Ciulei" ("The History of Crimes of Passion: the Liviu Ciulei Case"), in Jurnalul Național, September 17, 2005
- Vladimir Tismăneanu, Stalinism for All Seasons: A Political History of Romanian Communism, University of California Press, Berkeley, 2003 ISBN 0-520-23747-1
- (in Romanian) Ilarion Țiu, "Aliatul lui Stalin" ("Stalin's Ally"), in Jurnalul Național, June 7, 2005

Party political offices
Preceded by none	General secretary of the Romanian Communist Party; 1921–1924	Succeeded by Elek Köblös
