= Dealul Spirii Trial =

Political trial in the Kingdom of Romania

Dealul Spirii Trial (Romanian: Procesul din Dealul Spirii) was a political trial conducted from January to June 1922 by a military tribunal in the Kingdom of Romania. 271 members of the Communist Party of Romania were accused of treason after voting for the inclusion of the party into the Third International. The defendants were convicted and later pardoned.

The trial — the largest anti-communist trial in the country during the interwar period — was the first step of the repression of communists in the Kingdom of Romania. Less than two years after the trial, the parliament voted a total ban of the Communist Party and communist ideology; for the next two decades, the government enforced a violent repression against the communists and labour unions.

A number of politicians and intellectuals, including Nicolae Iorga, Dem I. Dobrescu, and Iuliu Maniu voiced their discontent over the lack of constitutional basis for the trial.

== Arrests ==
On May 12, 1921, the last day of the Congress of the Romanian Socialist-Communist Party, the party leaders (including Gheorghe Cristescu, Moscu Kohn, Mihail Gheorghiu Bujor, and Elek Köblös), as well as a large number of communist sympathisers were arrested by gendarmes and police who broke into the hall.

They were held for eight months in miserable conditions, the detention being extremely tough for all of them, being tortured and not being allowed to have visits of relatives. They were forced to work for the military, cleaning up the latrines and the courtyards of the barracks.

== Charges ==
The communists were put into a joint trial with Max Goldstein, an anarchist who bombed the Senate on 8 December 1920, killing three people.

The charges included a large number of crimes including crime against the state security, terrorism, collaboration with the enemy and instigation to riot. The main evidence for the charges was that the communists voted for the affiliation of the party to the Third International.

Gheorghe Cristescu, the leader of the party was the main defendant. Constantin Cernat, the royal commissaire, accused him of "taking an active part in preaching the abolition of the present form of government, preaching rebellion, insulting and contempting state institutions". Cernat tried to prove the links between the Socialist movement in Romania and the Soviet Union.

== Trial ==
The trial took place on Dealul Spirii, a hill in Bucharest, where the Senate of Romania was located, and where the Palace of the Parliament now stands. Under the pretext that the courtroom was too small, the public was not allowed to witness the trial and only a small number of journalists were allowed inside.

The main defense attorney was Dem I. Dobrescu, the dean of the Bucharest Bar, helped by leading lawyers including Osvald Teodoreanu, Iorgu Petrovici, and N. D. Cocea. The defense brought 600 witnesses, while the prosecuting attorney brought 300 witnesses.

In favour of the communists spoke General Alexandru Averescu, Iuliu Maniu, the managing director of Adevărul, and Constantin Mille; historian Nicolae Iorga said he supported the communists' right to a fair trial and argued that the affiliation to an international organization is not an action against state security.

The defense strategy was to try to separate the defenders into people who were arrested for their political activity (the communists) and the anarchists, such as Max Goldstein.

== Verdict ==
Max Goldstein, sentenced to forced labour for life

All but 37 of the prisoners were convicted. Among those that were found innocent were Mihail Cruceanu, Moscu Kohn, Ilie Moscovici, Elek Köblös, and Constantin Popovici. The sentences for the Communist Party members varied from 1 month in prison to 10 years of forced labour; Goldstein was convicted to forced labour for life.

== Amnesty ==
The defenders began a hunger strike. As the press began revealing the abuses in the prison, two prison guards, a captain and a lieutenant, were dismissed.

Lawyer Take Polikrat wrote a letter to King Ferdinand I of Romania, asking him to show his goodwill toward the defendants. On June 6, 1922 an amnesty decree was issued by the government in the name of the king, which was signed by the Prime Minister Ion I. C. Brătianu, the Minister of Justice Ioan Theodor Florescu, and the Minister of War, General Gheorghe Mărdărescu. Soon after, 213 of the prisoners were released. Excluded from amnesty were 48 of the defendants, who stood accused of high treason, military espionage, or terrorist attacks. In addition to Max Goldstein, Leon Lichtblau, Paul Goldstein, and Rebeca Goldstein were also sentenced to forced labor for life, Saul Ozias to 10 years in prison, Constantin Agiu to 8 years, and Lupu Goldstein to 5 years; those sentences were upheld.
