= Marcel Pauker =

Romanian activist (1896–1938)

Marcel Pauker

Marcel Pauker (rendered in Russian as Марцел Паукер, Martsel Pauker; December 6, 1896, Bucharest – August 16, 1938, Butovo, near Moscow) was a Romanian communist militant and husband of the future Romanian Communist leader Ana Pauker.

During his life, Pauker took a series of pseudonyms, the ones used most being: Burghezul, Herman Gugenheim, Paul Lampart, Luximin, Puiu, Priu, Semionovici Marin, Stepan, and Paul Weiss.

== Early life ==
Born to a secular Jewish family, Marcel Pauker was a polyglot, and noted speaker of Esperanto. He briefly studied engineering in Zürich, before enlisting as an artillery cadet and becoming a Second Lieutenant in 1916 (during World War I). Between 1919 and 1921, he lived in Switzerland for a second time, receiving his diploma in engineering.

== Militancy ==
In December 1921, Pauker was designated a member of the Provisional Committee of the Communist Party of Romania. In 1922, he became a member of the Central Committee and the Politburo, and was sent as delegate to the Balkan Communist Federation Conferences in Sofia (June 1922) and Berlin (1923). His activities brought him to the attention of the Romanian authorities: he was arrested and sentenced first to ten years imprisonment, and then to labour for life. Nevertheless, he managed to escape and flee to the Soviet Union in 1925, returning to Romania in 1929. On his arrival he was escorted back to prison, only to be released under the terms of an amnesty. He was yet again arrested in Petroșani, after his activities as an instigator during the Jiu Valley miners' strike of August 1929.

== Final years and death ==
Marcel Pauker got involved in a political fight with Vitali Holostenco, reflecting the struggle between the Bucharest section and that of the Ukrainian SSR that had taken hold of the Party's wing inside the Soviet Union around the proceedings of the 4th Congress in Kharkiv. Again in the Soviet Union, Pauker was reprimanded by the Comintern. Banned from political activities, he was sent to assist as an engineer in the industrial expansion of Magnitogorsk (in western Siberia), a job he undertook between 1930 and 1932. At the same time, Joseph Stalin, whose priority at the time was showing the façade of "unity" within his subject Parties, had Holostenco removed from his position.

In 1935 Pauker was appointed a member of the Secretariat of the Romanian Communist Party. He spent time in Prague until 1937, when he returned to the Soviet Union. He fell victim to the Great Purge: arrested by the NKVD on March 21, 1937 and held in the infamous Taganka Prison, Marcel Pauker was first interrogated over a year later, being presented with the charge of espionage in favour of Romania. Records show that he finally admitted to the charge (most likely after being subjected to torture). Consequently, he was put on trial, sentenced to death and executed by shooting.

== Rehabilitation ==
Marcel Pauker was rehabilitated by Soviet authorities in 1957 (as part of the De-Stalinization process under Nikita Khrushchev). Gheorghe Gheorghiu-Dej's rejection of newer Soviet policies prevented this and other such cases from being mirrored in Communist Romania. While Gheorghiu-Dej was exercising a looser control of the society, he was not ready to question most of the Stalinist measures, as these had served to enforce his own rule during the previous decade.

The case was reconsidered under Nicolae Ceaușescu's further distancing measures. Pauker's name was cleared, but mention of his activities and details of his life were kept secret.

== Family ==
Largely thanks to circumstances, Ana Pauker was able to survive her husband's downfall, and she even reached the peak of her political career in the following years. They had three children together: Tanio (1921–1922), Vlad (1926–2016), and Tatiana (1928–2011). Vlad moved to France.

In 1931 Marcel also fathered a son named Yakov, from his relationship with fellow militant Roza Elbert. He also had lengthy affairs with Elena Filipovici and Vanda Nicolschi.
