= Alexandru Dobrogeanu-Gherea =

Romanian academic

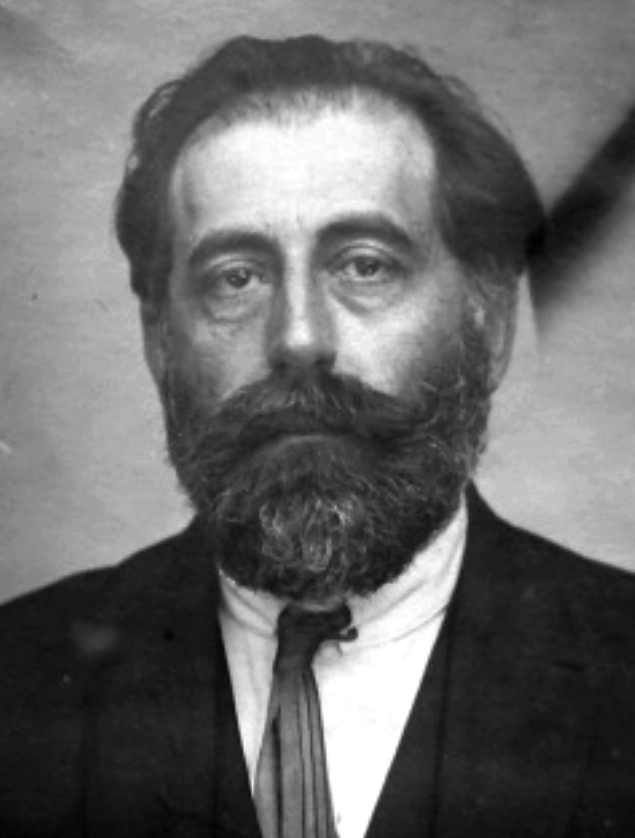
Gherea's mug shot

Alexandru Dobrogeanu-Gherea or Alexandru Gherea (rendered in Russian as Александр Доброджану-Геря or Доброжану-Гере - Aleksandr Dobrodzhanu-Gerya /Dobrozhanu-Gere; 7 July 1879 —4 November 1937) was a Romanian communist militant and son of socialist, sociologist and literary critic Constantin Dobrogeanu-Gherea. He used the pseudonyms of G. Alexe and Sașa/Sasha.

== Socialist activism ==
He was born in Ploiești, the son of Constantin Dobrogeanu-Gherea and his wife, Sofia Parcevska. He studied engineering at the University of Berlin, becoming a member of the Romanian Social-Democratic Workers' Party in 1910. During World War I, Gherea served in a field artillery regiment.

He joined the Socialist Party of Romania (the revived form of the Social Democrats) in 1918, and was one of its five delegates (one of the others was Gheorghe Cristescu) to the 1920 Moscow Comintern meeting that called for the Romanian group to follow Bolshevik lines. He was twice elected to the Romanian Parliament (in 1920 and 1922).

== Communism ==
Dobrogeanu-Gherea was one of the Party members who had voted in favor of the transformation of the group into the Socialist-Communist Party (that soon turned into the Romanian Communist Party), in May 1921. Thus, Gherea was arrested together with the other Comintern supporters, and confronted with terrorist Max Goldstein during the Dealul Spirii Trial of the next months. He was convicted, but soon released through an amnesty on 4 June 1922. In the same year, he was chosen a member of the Overseeing Committee and an agrarian commission at the new Party's 2nd Congress in Ploiești. He was a member of the Central Committee during the preparations for the 3rd Congress in Vienna, and as such occupied a central position when the Party was outlawed in 1924 (although he probably never was the general secretary, as some sources claim). Arrested in December, he was released on probation in 1925, using the circumstances to make his escape to the Soviet Union, being sentenced in absentia to ten years in prison.

Gherea took part in the July 1928 4th Party Congress in Kharkiv, returning yet again to Romania, arrested for a third time and serving time in prison, only to benefit from another amnesty, in 1929.

== Victim of repression ==
From 1932, he lived in the Soviet Union, working as a journalist and holding official positions in the Comintern. Gherea translated some of Vladimir Lenin's works into Romanian.

Together with the majority of Romanian communists inside the Soviet Union, after attracting Joseph Stalin's suspicion, he fell victim to the Great Purge: arrested in September 1937 for "participation in a counter-revolutionary organisation", he was executed the following month in Moscow.

In April 1968, Nicolae Ceaușescu's regime chose to investigate and exonerate most of the former Party members to have died in the period, Dobrogeanu-Gherea included. A similar measure had been taken inside the Soviet state in 1956, during Nikita Khrushchev's process of de-Stalinization.

== Sources ==
- Stelian Tănase, Procesul din Dealul Spirei
- Dosarele Istoriei, 10/1998
