= Ilie Moscovici =

Romanian socialist militant and journalist (1885–1943)

Ilie B. Moscovici
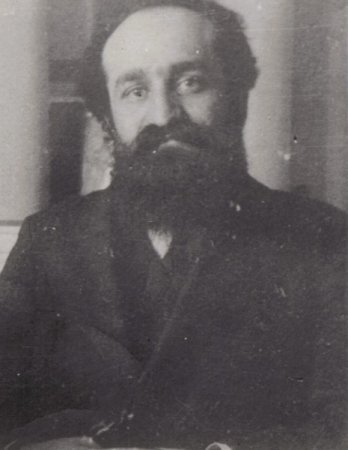
- Moscovici, ca. 1920

Member of the Romanian Social Democratic Party Executive Bureau
- In office 9 May 1927 – 1928

Member of the Assembly of Deputies of Romania
- In office May 1920 – May 1921

Personal details
- Born: 28 November 1885 Băiceni, Iași County, Romania
- Died: 1 November 1943 (aged 57) Bucharest, Romania
- Writing career
- Pen name: I. Nour

Ilie B. Moscovici (also known as Tovilie; 28 November 1885 – 1 November 1943) was a Romanian socialist militant and journalist, one of the noted leaders of the Romanian Social Democratic Party (PSDR). A socialist since early youth and a party member since its creation in 1910, he returned from captivity in World War I to lead the PSDR from Bucharest, and involved himself in a violent clash with the Romanian authorities. He mediated between reformist and Bolshevik currents, and helped establish the Socialist Party of Romania (PS) as a fusion of both tendencies. Moscovici served as a PS representative in Chamber, but was deposed over his instigation of the 1920 general strike, then imprisoned. Although he voted against the creation of a Communist Party from the rump PS and criticized Comintern interference in Romanian affairs, he was again apprehended in 1921. Together with the communists, he appeared as a defendant in the Dealul Spirii Trial.

Moscovici spent the 1920s and 1930s on reconstructing the PSDR and enlarging its basis, sometimes together with, and sometimes against, the moderate socialist Constantin Titel Petrescu. He was the party's representative to the Labor and Socialist International, a participant in antifascist causes, and a publisher of Marxist literature. Seen as the Social Democratic doctrinaire, he continued to take stands against the Communist Party and the Soviet Union, cautioning against the formation of a "popular front".

Persecuted by the far-right for his politics and his Jewish ethnicity, Moscovici was still active in the clandestine PSDR by the time of World War II. He died, after a long illness, before his party's involvement in the Coup of 1944. In later years, after the PSDR was absorbed by the Communist Party, Moscovici's contribution was censored out of socialist history. His work was carried on by his daughter, Mira Moscovici, who helped reestablish an independent PSDR in 1990, during the country's post-communist era. Moscovici's relatives include French social scientist Serge Moscovici and his son, the politician Pierre Moscovici.

== Biography ==
=== Early life and World War I ===
Moscovici was born on 28 November 1885, in Băiceni village, Iași County (just outside Pașcani, where he always owned a townhouse). He is known to have completed his secondary studies at the National College in Iași, and to have enlisted at the local university faculty of medicine in 1906. He was already active in Marxist milieu, scattered after the earlier split of the Romanian Social-Democratic Workers' Party. Young Moscovici joined up with Leon Ghelerter's "Social Studies Circle", where he became comrades with Mihail Gheorghiu Bujor, Ottoi Călin, Max Wexler, and Emanoil Socor. He was a frequent contributor to the socialist press, in magazines such as România Muncitoare or Lupta, and translated under the pen name I. Nour.

In 1910, Moscovici and the entire Social Studies Circle became members of the Social Democratic Party (PSDR), founded as Romania's new socialist party. At the second party congress, in June 1912, Moscovici and Constantin Popovici were rapporteurs on workers' compensation issues. The following year, with Romania's entry into the Second Balkan War, Moscovici was drafted as a medic into the Romanian Land Forces, and sent to the Bulgarian front; he witnessed first-hand the failures of sanitation and healthcare in the army, as some 5,600 soldiers died of cholera and other treatable causes.

Upon his return to Bucharest, Moscovici reported to his party about the matter, and organized a public protest against Conservative Party rule. Joining him in this effort were other veterans of the Bulgarian campaign, including his lifelong friends Constantin Titel Petrescu and Toma Dragu, alongside the socialist physician Ecaterina Arbore. The authorities moved to organize a court-martial, but withdrew the request when faced with public outcry. In August 1913, Moscovici was in Dobreni commune, Neamț County, addressing the local peasants and trying to get them interested in the PSDR agenda.

In 1916, at the height of World War I, Romania declared war on the Central Powers; she lost the subsequent battle, and the legitimate government was forced to withdraw to Iași, presiding over a rump Romanian state. Again mobilized as a reserve officer, Moscovici was captured by the German Army, interned, and transported to Germany as a prisoner of war. In May 1917, he was at the POW camp in Krefeld, sharing captivity with the likes of Alexandru D. Sturdza and Mircea Florian. Set free by the time of Romania's peace with the Central Powers, Moscovici returned to Bucharest, which was still occupied by German troops. For a while, he turned to regular journalism, and, with A. de Herz, Liviu Rebreanu, Scarlat Froda and Barbu Lăzăreanu, put out a theatrical daily, Scena. He left after a few months and was replaced with Așer Penijel. Most of his fellow prisoners were also repatriated on 19 May 1918.

During the interval, Moscovici also resumed his contacts with the PSDR, which was hostile to the German occupiers and undecided about the government in Iași. Moscovici resumed his militancy, cooperating with Gheorghe Cristescu and other Bucharest socialists. As the PSDR general secretary (later co-chair of the Executive Committee), he was one of the main figures in attendance at the social-democratic club on Sfântul Ionică Street, Bucharest. Alongside its core of PSDR activists, the club was frequented by self-styled "Bolsheviks", including David Fabian and the teenaged Belu Zilber. The latter recalls that Moscovici, who did not share his radicalism, was "a figure of rare magnanimity, with an ancestral Judaic passion for ideas."

=== Socialist Party and 1918 trial ===
The party openly rejected the peace with Germany, but did so by invoking Wilsonian principles, including the slogan of "peace with no annexations". The German crackdown brought ended with the arrest of Moscovici and his colleagues, and their detainment at Văcărești. After the November Armistice (Germany's unexpected defeat), the PSDR gained importance in the disorganized territory, from which the Germans were hastily withdrawing. In 1922, Moscovici himself wrote that the party missed out on an opportunity for revolution, because it "refused" to do so. Although the workers' guard outnumbered the Gendarmerie, the PSDR agreed to allow censorship of its press, and did not participate in the oil industry strikes of 30 November.

On 11 December, the PSDR transformed itself into the Socialist Party of Romania. Its program, written down by Șerban Voinea in 1919, specified that the members stood for "scientific socialism" and the socialization of property, but also for reformism (in the absence of a revolutionary class). The PS was immediately approached for secretive talks by radicalized members of the establishment, grouped in the People's Party (PP). The central issue was the PS' nominal support for republicanism, which was also espoused by some of the PP doctrinaires—though not by the party leader, General Alexandru Averescu. In exchange for support, Averescu was ready to co-opt the PS into a future government. Moscovici was among the PS representatives who discussed the matter with PP emissaries Constantin Argetoianu and P. P. Negulescu. In the end, the socialists were adamant in their rejection of a compromise.

Although favoring non-engagement, Moscovici and Cristescu approved of the typesetters' call to a general strike on 25 December, after it became apparent that the outcome was inevitable. For his part, Moscovici was in contact with centrist newspaper proprietors such as Grigore Filipescu, who wanted to organize their own solidarity strike against censorship. Even though they did not take part in organizing the actual workers' strike, the PS men were immediately identified as culprits by the authorities, who amassed a Chasseurs' Regiment around the Sfântul Ionică building. It was at that moment, on 26 December, that Moscovici and other moderates took the initiative, and sent couriers at factories throughout the city, calling union men to leave their stations and rally on the army-occupied street.

In hindsight, Moscovici referred to this as a hasty action, leading into a trap set by the authorities. In later communist historiography, he was condemned for "not posing [himself] the problem of organizing the workers' revolutionary fight, [...] so as the masses would avoid bloody attacks by the authorities, or respond to such attacks with due force." Some tens of workers were killed when the Chasseurs' Regiment fired on the columns gathering at Teatrului Square, on Calea Victoriei; up to 500 people, including labor organizer I. C. Frimu, were arrested. Although more violent columns of workers managed to resist the onslaught and reportedly negotiated a ceasefire, the authorities maintained the mood of repression for several months.

A large segment of PS activists (48 men), was court-martialled on various charges: with Cristescu, Popovici, Voinea and Alecu Constantinescu, Moscovici was indicted of sedition and "bringing offense" to King Ferdinand I. A celebrity defense team, comprising Petrescu, Constantin Mille, Constantin Costa-Foru, N. D. Cocea, Constantin Angelescu, Radu D. Rosetti, and D. R. Ioanițescu, managed to obtain acquittals for most of the defendants. The party continued to threaten with strike actions during the closing months of 1919, and, although it won seats in the November election, boycotted Parliament. In parallel, the PS committees negotiated an understanding with socialist Romanians from those former regions of Austria-Hungary which had been incorporated into Greater Romania. In October 1920, the PS absorbed the Bukovina Social Democratic Party and the Transylvania Social Democratic Party. The reorganized party, an uneasy alliance of reformists and Bolshevized radicals, held sway over the 156 trade unions in Greater Romania, having blocked out competition from syndicalism and anarchism. It counted 148,500 as its total members.

=== 1920 strike ===
Moscovici, who represented the PS Executive Committee at the funeral ceremony of Marxist theorist Constantin Dobrogeanu-Gherea, ran in the May 1920 suffrage, carried out under a PP government. He was elected to the Assembly (Chamber) of Deputies, alongside Cristescu. Fellow deputy Alexandru Vaida-Voevod, of the right-wing National Romanian Party, recalled hearing them speak: Cristescu, he noted, was an "uncultured Romanian", whereas Moscovici was a "cultured Jew". According to the American visitor Charles Upson Clark, Moscovici was a remarkable figure, "the most prominent Jewish member of the House".

The party involved itself in the radical opposition to the Averescu government, calling the administration a "terror regime" denying workers "their most basic citizens' rights". The PS and many others on the left were infuriated by Minister Grigore Trancu-Iași's law on labor courts, which seemed like an effort to reduce unions' representative power. On 10 October 1920, Moscovici was one of the participants to the congress of the General Council of the Socialist Party and Labor Unions. In its ultimatum to the government, it asked for the recognition of collective bargaining, and demanded a unified and advanced system of workers' compensation, threatening with a general strike in case of non-compliance. With Iosif Jumanca and Rudolf Gaidosch, Moscovici was part of a PS commission of handpicked moderates who presented Averescu with the PS' demands.

When Averescu refused to give in, the PS put into motion the 20 October general strike, with the peaceful slogan: "Everyone stays at home, we will hold no demonstrations so as not to leave room for the provocateurs." Beyond this facade, the PS was torn by factionalism. The radical section made open calls for the party's transformation. In the theoretical organ Lupta de Clasă, there was already talk of forming "the vanguard party of the proletariat, the communist party". Yet, as Moscovici explained in a 1922 essay, Problemele actuale ale mișcării socialiste ("Current Issues Facing the Socialist Movement"), "although ours is a revolutionary party, who realizes that Capitalist Society cannot be overturned in any other way but through a revolution—once our Society, like our proletariat, is ripened enough for it [Moscovici's italics]—, it would be an enormous mistake to maintain that the general strike has aimed to overthrow the current State's regime." The socialists' attempt to "pressure" the government into reforming the labor legislation "failed, and we did not wish for a revolution."

The immediate effects of the strike were an economic crisis and a settlement between the right-wing National Liberal Party, in the opposition, and the PP government. As the academic and labor organizer Nicolae Ghiulea attests: "General Averescu's government reacted by ordering the sentencing of socialist leaders, the arrest of all workers who had any sort of influence over their comrades, the dissolution of all trade unions, the suspension of the socialist and workers' press, the closure and destruction of press quarters. Scattered, lacking a class consciousness and with no means of resistance, the working masses abandoned the movement." In May 1921, Averescu also passed a more liberal law on labor disputes, which allowed trade unions to form but screened their leadership for various criteria, including Romanian ethnicity.

Moscovici, stripped of his seat in the Chamber, was made subject to a court-martial. Its proceedings were a publicized affair: Averescu himself was called to the stand, where he reluctantly acknowledged having called upon the PS during his time in the opposition. The revelation of Averescu's "plot against the Crown" left a mark on public opinion. Writing at the time, sociologist Dimitrie Drăghicescu argued that "somebody with enough courage and authority should take the plotter by the collar and throw him into that place where he himself has thrown Ilie Moscovici." In the end, Moscovici, Socor, and three other defendants were sentenced to five years of penal labor. Upon hearing the verdict, Moscovici was heard shouting: "Socialism shall not die! Long live socialism!"

=== Communist schism ===
The recipient of an amnesty, Moscovici returned to the PS just as the radical side, inspired by the consolidation of Soviet Russia, was pushing for the party's affiliation to the Comintern. In essence, Moscovici, Petrescu and other centrists did not reject outright the notion of affiliating, but demanded guarantees—whereas the "rightist" side of the PS, with Jumanca, Voinea, and Iacob Pistiner, simply objected to all manner of contact with the Soviets. They were joined by Ioan Flueraș, leader of the Transylvanian socialists, who had visited Russia, experienced communism directly without being won over, and denounced the Comintern's agenda; the Comintern deposed him from the delegation, citing Flueraș's presence on the Transylvanian Council that voted union with Romania.

The pro-Comintern left, however, included Moscovici's old associate and Chamber colleague, Cristescu. As Moscovici himself noted, the latter returned from Russia with orders to expel the "opportunistic" members on the right. According to a retrospective article published by Lumea Nouă newspaper in 1922, the old socialists were only reserved one seat on the Executive Committee, to be contested between Cristescu, Popovici and Moscovici. Nevertheless, later historians argue that the list of the Central Committee imposed by the Comintern comprised not only all three, but also trade unionists and other centrist socialists.

As Moscovici later stated, Comintern affiliation "means true disaster for the workers; it has always been the greatest obstacle to achieving or preparing the socialist revolution." The mass of proletarians, he suggested, was unprepared for a major political role, which could only be arrived at through gradualism ("the strengthening of the working masses in body and spirit"). According to Bolshevik delegate Mihail Cruceanu, Moscovici was making efforts to boycott a PS vote on the issue, refusing to convene a congress and leaving intact the seal placed by Averescu's police on the Sfântul Ionică building. On the right, George Grigorovici also reacted to Cristescu's Bolshevism by reestablishing the Bukovina Social Democratic Party. Accused by the communists of playing into the hands of the political establishment, this group competed with the PS for a few months, claiming to embody the PDSR's moderate core. Together with the other formerly Austro-Hungarian chapters of the PS, Grigorovici set up his own Provisional Central Committee, later Federation of Socialist Parties from Romania (FPSR).

Such moves led the radical faction in effective control of the PS. On 8 May 1921, this group, with Cristescu at the helm, voted to set up the Romanian Communist Party (PCdR, or "Socialist-Communists"), a Comintern affiliate. As Ghiulea noted, the vote signified a "communist takeover of the socialist party", leaving socialism divided into "three pathways". The PCdR was that of "violent agitation." As argued by Clark, the Socialist Party survived an attempted seizure "by Communistic elements". This was also the version supported by Moscovici's rump PS. In February 1922, it defined the PCdR as a "brand new party", adding: "we are the continuation of the old party with its program, that no one and nothing has been able to change."

The government moved to immediately arrest and prosecute those delegates present at Sfântul Ionică during the vote. Moscovici was picked up as well, and, although he had voted against Comintern membership, was indicted in the subsequent Dealul Spirii Trial. The prosecutor aimed to show that he and Cristescu had conspired "to overthrow the current form of government". Kept separate from his former colleagues, Moscovici was among those acquitted, alongside Cruceanu, Popovici, and Elek Köblös (most of the others were eventually amnestied by the king).

Moscovici's rump PS ultimately joined up with Jumanca and Flueraș's FPSR by August 1922. According to the communist press of the day, this group, also known as Unified Party, only managed to keep as its members "some tens of renegades"; however, the FPSR claimed that the PCdR only managed to sign up some 500 of the total 40,000 PS members, the rest having defected after the Comintern affiliation. At the same time, according to the reports presented at its 1922 congress, the FPSR claimed 12,000 members, of which 6,000 in Banat, 2,000 in Transylvania and 2,000 in Bukovina. Moscovici, as ideologue of the Federation, noted that the coming "Social Revolution" would not be inspired by Russia, but could only be "handed down to us by the proletarian class in advanced countries".

The Federation signaled its opposition to the Comintern by rallying with the International Working Union of Socialist Parties (the "2½ International"), and later to the Labor and Socialist International (LSI). Moscovici was the party representative to the ISWU Congress in Hamburg. Back in Romania, he was one of the socialists who also joined the League of Human Rights, alongside left-leaning politicians such as Costa-Foru, Nicolae Lupu, Vasile Stroiescu and Dem I. Dobrescu.

=== PSDR survival ===
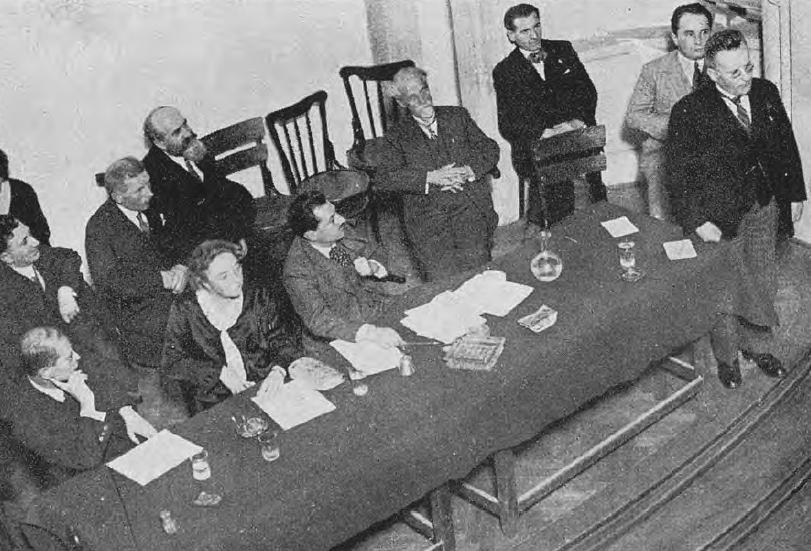
Moscovici (back row, in dark suit), listening in as Paul Löbe speaks in front of the Socialist Inter-Parliamentary Conference of 1931. The photograph also shows Constantin Titel Petrescu (seated directly in front of Moscovici), Lothar Rădăceanu, Yanko Sakazov, and various representatives of the Belgian and Czechoslovak socialist parties

After the 1922 election, Pistiner was the only FPSR deputy in Chamber, allowing the center-left Peasants' Party to represent the main channel for workers' grievances. However, according to Drăghicescu, the FPSR was destined to slowly erode the Peasantist vote, with the consolidation of the proletarian class. Moscovici, Grigorovici, alongside Ghelerter and Dragu, were "realistic" leaders, who could potentially transform the FPSR from a sectarian "class party" into a "party of ideas". At the time, the party's theorist was Voinea, who, as an Austromarxist, steered the FPSR away from social-liberal deviations. For his part, Moscovici represented the FPSR and spoke about its policies at Dimitrie Gusti's Social Institute—one of a set of conferences in which Romanian doctrinaires advertised their respective ideologies.

In March 1924, Moscovici, Flueraș and Pistiner were the Romanian representatives to the Balkan Socialist Conference of Bucharest. They received prominent figures of the LSI, including Irakli Tsereteli, Friedrich Adler, Živko Topalović, Yanko Sakazov, and Asen Tsankov. Nevertheless, the Federation continued to discuss secretly with the PCdR, even after the latter had been outlawed; communist militants identified Moscovici as one of the main opponents of a tactical "united front". In Lumea Nouă, Moscovici denounced the Comintern's directives on the matter. The communists, Moscovici wrote, "have to come up once in a while with a proposal to create the united front, without ever bringing it about, so as to maneuver against other workers' parties and compromise the leaders of said parties." Moscovici looked into the Soviet Union's acts of provocation, and, in the official newspaper Socialismul, denounced the Tatarbunary Uprising as a Cominternist invasion. In his view, the Soviet-backed "Moldavian Republic" was "non-existent and ridiculous".

On 9 May 1927, following a Federation congress, the old PSDR was reborn, with a more centralized structure. Moscovici, Petrescu, Pistiner, Jumanca and Flueraș, as well as the younger Lothar Rădăceanu, were voted in as the Executive Bureau; Jumanca was the Secretary, Moscovici the Party Treasurer. He also took charge of the PSDR's publishing activity and cultural club. It was hosted by the printing offices of Barbu Brănișteanu, on Calea Victoriei, where Moscovici was the sales manager. He had regular meetings with left-wing figures such as the Peasantist leader Constantin Stere, the physician Simion Iagnov, and Voinea's half-brother, the sociologist Henri H. Stahl. As Stahl recalls: "the basis of my political conceptions, so to say, came from Moscovici, who was a very interesting man. He was a very well-read man. [...] he was a furious anti-Bolshevik." The enterprise, however, went out of business after publishing a single title—a brochure about Giacomo Matteotti.

Once consolidated, Romanian social democracy began cooperating with the National Peasants' Party (PNŢ), which showed most promise in reforming the Romanian social system. In cartel with the PNŢ, the PSDR made its return to Chamber following the election of 1928. The alliance ended abruptly when the PNŢ cabinet of Iuliu Maniu used violence to quell down the Lupeni Strike of 1929, while also refusing to release left-wing political prisoners. The PSDR suffered another setback in 1928, when the Ghelerter faction defected, reclaiming for itself the title of Social-Democratic Workers' Party, later Unitary Socialist Party (PSU). It managed to attract into its ranks Moscovici, Popovici, and eventually Cristescu, who had been deposed as PCdR leader.

Moscovici eventually returned to the PSDR, and attended, alongside Petrescu, the Socialist Inter-Parliamentary Conference of 1931. A year later, he was the party's delegate to the funeral of Iosif Ciser, a leader of the Jiu Valley miners. On 15 September 1929, Moscovici had become editor of a monthly, Mișcarea Socială ("The Social Movement"). With contributions from Voinea and Rădăceanu, and translations from Europe's leading Marxist theoreticians, it survived to 1933. Also in 1929, Moscovici and Socor sat on the board of a cooperative, Casa Poporului ("People's House"), which attempted to purchase land property and place it under proletarian administration.

=== Antifascist campaigns ===
The PSDR's pacifist anti-fascism was channeled in the creation of several left-wing bodies, frequented by Moscovici and accepting communist members: the Unitary Front, the League against Terror, the League against War and Fascism. The years after Ghelerter's departure brought clashes between the socialists and the antisemitic far-right, in particular the National-Christian Defense League (LANC). In 1926, a LANC politician, Nicolae Paulescu, proclaimed that "the kike Moscovici" managed an "almost entirely kikeified party." The League of Human Rights was dissolved that year, after Costa-Foru was beaten and mutilated by LANC youth. In early 1930, the international press reported that Moscovici and PSDR deputy Rădăceanu had been assaulted by far-right students and "badly abused". Moscovici was injured in the attack, and recovering at home.

At the 1933 PSDR Congress, which condemned the success of fascism in Europe and labeled Nazi Germany a "barbarous regime", Moscovici was elected to the Executive Committee. During those years, the activities of a LANC successor, the Iron Guard, signaled a deep political crisis. After Premier Ion G. Duca's assassination by an Iron Guard death squad, the authorities decided to also clamp down on the PSDR press. Deep rifts were also showing between the orthodox Marxism of Petrescu and Moscovici and the more reformist stance of Transylvanian socialists.

During 1936, citing the Comintern's revised "popular front" doctrine against fascism, the clandestine PCdR and its Red Aid connections negotiated a rapprochement with the PSDR. Moscovici's own political essays, taken up by Lumea Nouă, treated the communists' proposal with suspicion. As Petrescu argues, PSDR leaders were persuaded when communists renounced their "provocative and libelous verbiage"; but they eventually found it impossible to deal with a party that did not accept "legality and democracy." Instead, in 1937, the PSDR managed to reintegrate the Unitary Socialist Party, including Cristescu and his followers. During that time, Moscovici was reelected to the Executive Committee, and was again Party Treasurer.

The general election of 1937 evidenced the PSDR's decline after its split with the PNȚ: it only received 0.9% of the national vote. The tied elections were decided by King Carol II, who blocked the Iron Guard threat by handing power to another fascist group: the National Christian Party (PNC, successor of the LANC) with Octavian Goga as Premier. In its bid for additional support, the PNC managed to obtain the collaboration of some right-wing PSDR leaders, most notably Flueraș. The following year, Carol II instituted his own dictatorship, centered on the quasi-fascist National Renaissance Front (FRN). To Moscovici's chagrin, the FRN was also able to enlist some of the right-leaning socialists, who justified themselves as supporters "of the king against the Iron Guard." The most prominent defectors were Flueraș and Grigorovici, whose option made them bitter rivals of Petrescu (and, to a lesser degree, of Moscovici himself). Jumanca also left the party to support the FRN, but his relatively low profile allowed him to maintain more cordial contacts with the PSDR leaders.

=== Final years and death ===
Although all parties but the FRN had been banned by the authoritarian Constitution, the PSDR maintained an informal existence around Lumea Nouă paper (where Moscovici was still a leading contributor). However, the party had to relinquish its seats in the LSI. The FRN regime, politically isolated by World War II, crumbled in 1940, unable to deal with Nazi and Soviet pressures (the Soviet annexation of Bessarabia and the loss of Northern Transylvania). Romania experienced an episode of Iron Guard rule, with Ion Antonescu as the Conducător. The clandestine PSDR objected to such moves, as well as to the subsequent German occupation, placing its hopes in the Western Allies.

After securing his position in a bloody confrontation with the Iron Guard, Antonescu involved Romania in the war against the Soviet Union. Antisemitic measures and the clampdown on dissident activities reached a peak. Ailing from heart disease and noticeably poor, Moscovici was threatened with imminent eviction from his Bucharest home in Vatra Luminoasă, and had to move in with friends. As noted by his daughter Mira, the signal for this persecution was an article in the fascist newspaper Porunca Vremii. Against the family's protests, the house was listed for rent by the Romanianization bureau, which had barred Jews from placing bids. When Moscovici presented his certificate of service in World War I, guaranteeing him special treatment, the officials objected that he was not a war invalid. Moscovici was also prevented from cashing into his Journalists' Union pension, owing to his racial origins. He was advised to seek an interview with Antonescu, but he rejected the idea outright. Although exposed to such persecution, Moscovici had remained cautious of the Soviet Union, and informed himself about its crimes. His young friend Belu Zilber, at the time involved with the clandestine PCdR, recalls a brush with the anticommunist Moscovici some time after the Battle of Stalingrad. According to Zilber, Moscovici shouted at him that: "those Katyn people are coming, and they're going to kill you!". In summer 1943, with Petrescu, Moscovici also wrote a note to the International Revolutionary Marxist Centre, detailing the "treason" of Flueraș and Grigorovici.

The Moscovici family eventually found lodging on Bolliac Street. Kept under medical supervision by his socialist friend Nicolae Lupu, Moscovici had severe edema in his feet, and developed chronic infections. By October, he showed symptoms of atrial fibrillation and a decline in his mental state, with episodes of delirium. He died, after a twelve-day agony, on the morning of 1 November 1943. His funeral ceremony at Cenușa Crematorium offered the occasion for an impromptu socialist demonstration. As the junior PSDR activist Ion Pas wrote in 1945, this was "a final protest against fascist tyranny". Moscovici left no final will, but Mira forged one to prevent the family from being evicted by the Romanianization bureau.

== Posterity ==
Following the 23 August Coup of 1944, in which the PSDR played a significant part, Antonescu was toppled, and Romania made a swift return to multiparty rule. During the subsequent democratic interval, Moscovici was commemorated by Tudor Teodorescu-Braniște with a belated obituary in Jurnalul de Dimineaţă: "there are very few politicians in our country to have remained faithful to an idea their whole lives. [...] In this world of ours, Ilie Moscovici was and endured a socialist. He was not dissuaded by vain ambition. He was not frightened by poverty. He was not influenced by persecution." Although the PSDR was rapidly expanding, claiming some 700,000 members in 1945, it was being undermined by the infiltration of communists, who, inspired by the Soviet occupation of Romania, worked to absorb it into a much smaller PCdR. Addressing the rank and file of the party, the pro-communist Ștefan Voitec claimed that the merger had been envisaged by Moscovici while he was still alive—a claim that is seen as "opportunistic" by journalist and historian Victor Frunză. The communist takeover was effected at the congress of March 1946, and facilitated in part by Voinea's last-minute defection.

The PCdR recreated itself as a "Workers' Party", while the Independent Social Democrats, led by Petrescu and Jumanca, remained active until the 1948 installment of a fully-fledged Romanian communist regime. Both leaders ended up as political prisoners of the regime (Jumanca died in prison). During the Gheorghe Gheorghiu-Dej era of Romanian communism, Moscovici's activity was almost entirely stricken out from historical records. Zilber, who fell out with the communist regime and spent 18 years as a political prisoner, noted in his memoirs that expunging Moscovici and other deceased but inconvenient socialists from the history of Romania was "not hard at all": "difficulties showed up only when it came to the live ones".

Having vowed to avenge her father's death and continue his work, Mira Moscovici preserved her spiritual affiliation to non-communist socialism. After the ascendency of Nicolae Ceaușescu as communist leader, she frequented dissident circles and was placed under surveillance by the Securitate secret police. The Moscovici family maintained close contacts with Italian President Sandro Pertini, informing him about the realities of Ceaușescu's rule, beyond its liberalized facade. Shortly after Romanian Revolution of 1989, which reinstated multiparty democracy, Mira Moscovici joined Sergiu Cunescu and Adrian Dimitriu in reestablishing the PSDR. The Ilie and Mira Moscovici papers, preserved by Victor Frunză, are stored at the Institute for the Investigation of Communist Crimes and Memory of the Romanian Exile.

Ilie's nephew, Serge Moscovici, was himself exposed to antisemitic persecution as a youngster, and had to perform forced labor in a factory. He left for France in 1947, and became a major figure in social psychology, as well as a radical social theorist. Serge's son, the economist Pierre Moscovici, is a French Socialist Party politician. He has served in various ministerial posts, including as Finance Minister between 2012 and 2014. Pierre Moscovici was also one of the supervisors for Romania's European integration process.
