= Socialist Party of Romania =

Socialist Party of Romania Partidul Socialist din România
- Founded: 11 December 1918
- Dissolved: 8 May 1921
- Preceded by: Social Democratic Party of Romania
- Succeeded by: Communist Party of Romania
- Ideology: Socialism; Majority; Bolshevism; Minority; Reformism
- Political position: Left-wing to far-left

The Socialist Party of Romania (Romanian: Partidul Socialist din România, commonly known as Partidul Socialist, PS) was a Romanian socialist political party, created on 11 December 1918 by members of the Social Democratic Party of Romania (PSDR), after the latter emerged from clandestinity. Through its PSDR legacy, the PS maintained a close connection with the local labor movement and was symbolically linked to the first local socialist group, the Romanian Social-Democratic Workers' Party. Its creation coincided with the establishment of Greater Romania in the wake of World War I; after May 1919, it began a process of fusion with the social democratic groups of in the former territories of Austria-Hungary — the Social Democratic Parties of Transylvania, Banat and Bukovina. The parties adopted a common platform in October 1920. Progressively influenced by Leninism, the PS became divided between a maximalist majority supporting Bolshevik guidelines and a reformist-minded minority: the former affiliated with the Comintern as the Socialist-Communist Party in May 1921 (officially known as Communist Party of Romania from 1922), while the minority eventually established a new Romanian Social Democratic Party.

The PS had its headquarters in Bucharest, at the Socialist Club on Sfântul Ionică Street No.12, near the old National Theater (located just north of University Square, the street is currently a section of Ion Câmpineanu Street, after the latter was rerouted). The building eventually also housed all Romanian trade unions of the period, as well as the General Trade Unions' Commission. The Socialists edited the newspaper Socialismul, headquartered on Academiei Street.

== History ==
=== Context ===
In 1915, at a time when Romania kept its neutrality, the PSDR, led by the revolutionary-minded Marxist Christian Rakovsky, played a prominent part inside the anti-war Zimmerwald Movement. Throughout the following year, it organized rallies in support of non-intervention into what it deemed "an imperialist conflict". When Romania joined the Entente Powers in August 1916, the group came under suspicion of supporting the Central Powers, and was outlawed soon after. While its secretary Dumitru Marinescu was drafted and killed in action during the Romanian Campaign, several of its prominent activists, including Rakovsky, were arrested. Gheorghe Cristescu, Alecu Constantinescu, and others remained active in Bucharest under occupation by the Central Powers, and maintained links with the Social Democratic Party of Germany; the group, also including Ecaterina Arbore, Constantin Popovici, Ilie Moscovici, Ghiță Moscu, and Constantin Titel Petrescu, protested the peace with the Central powers and was arrested by the Alexandru Marghiloman government, but released through an amnesty soon after.

The PSDR's history was decisively marked by the Russian Revolution of 1917. Following the February Revolution, Rakovsky was set free by Russian troops present in Iaşi, and took refuge in Odessa — he became active in revolutionary politics against the Romanian state, and joined the Bolsheviks. As a member of the Rumcherod authority in Odessa, he joined with Mihai Gheorghiu Bujor, Alexandru Nicolau and Ion Dic Dicescu's short-lived Romanian Social Democratic Action Committee in planning an insurgency, before being driven out by a German military intervention.

=== Creation ===
The PSDR itself radicalized its message, adding to its previous calls for universal suffrage a republican program and support for land reform. Its program also called for an end to all forms of exploitation, but argued that this was to be fulfilled inside the existing legislative framework. King Ferdinand I's promise to legislate the land reform, together with electoral reform, was embraced by PSDR's moderate wing.

After the party adopted its new name, it proclaimed its commitment to dictatorship of the proletariat, and became involved in supporting the radicalized labor movement, culminating in the 1920 general strike.

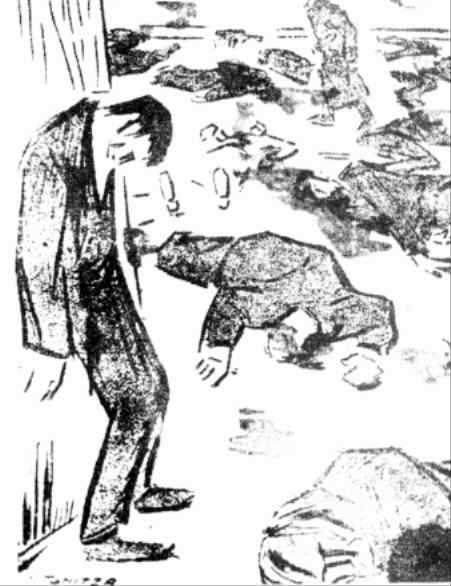
1918-12-13 Seven o'clock in the evening... It's quiet throughout the land. (Cartoon by Nicolae Tonitza, published in Socialismul, December 1919)

On 26 December [O.S. 13 December] 1918, just days after the party was founded, typesetters at various presses in Bucharest, who had been protesting since November, rallied in front of the Sfântul Ionică building and marched on the Ministry of Industry headquarters on Calea Victoriei, asking for the eight-hour day, salary increases, the guarantee of civil liberties, and more say for the trade unions. The group quickly swelled in numbers, to about as many as 15,000 workers in a contemporary account. On orders of the Constantin Coandă cabinet, who feared Bolshevik agitation, troops were ultimately ordered to fire on the crowd and assail it with bayonets in as many as three successive waves. They also stormed into the Sfântul Ionică building and arrested several Socialist leaders, including the general secretary Moscovici and I. C. Frimu (Frimu later died in custody). Four PS members, including Alecu Constantinescu, were each sentenced to five years in prison, while all others arrested were acquitted. Eventually, in February 1919, most demands of the Socialist group were fulfilled after the Transylvanian Socialists Iosif Jumanca and Ioan Flueraş, urged by Constantin Titel Petrescu, came to Bucharest and discussed the matter with both King Ferdinand and the new Premier, Ion I. C. Brătianu.

In May 1919, delegates of the Transylvanian and Bukovinian groups began negotiations with the PS to form a single political movement, and elected representatives to the newly created General Council of the Socialist Party. A single statute was adopted in October 1920.

In late 1919, the main Socialist Party and the Transylvanian wing were approached by the emerging People's Party for a fusion; the matter was discussed between, on the Socialist side, Moscovici, Flueraş, and Jumanca, and, from among the People's Party, by Alexandru Averescu and Constantin Argetoianu. Talks yielded no results, especially after Averescu attempted to impose his party's platform on the Socialists. During negotiations, Argetoianu observed that unease was growing between Moscovici's group and the party's far left, rallied around Cristescu.

After the election of 1919, when it reused the PSDR's logo of two crossed hammers, the PS sent 7 representatives to the Chamber of Deputies; it was awarded 19 seats in the latter and 3 in the Senate following the 1920 elections. The three senatorial candidates of that year — Cristescu, Alexandru Dobrogeanu-Gherea and Boris Stefanov — were not validated into Parliament, despite having carried the popular vote. The PS' involvement in the 1920 strike caused authorities to organize a swift crackdown (50 party members were still held in prisons by early 1921).

In early 1921, the PS had 27 branches nationwide, totaling 40,000 to 45,000 registered members and rallying support from most workers affiliated with trade unions (more than 200,000 people). Estimates place the industrial working class of the 1920s and 1930s at between 400,000 and 820,000 people.

Notable PS activists at the time were David Fabian, Elena Filipescu, and Panait Muşoiu. Among the PS' sympathizers were the artist and former prisoner of war Nicolae Tonitza, who regularly contributed graphics to Socialismul, and the writer Gala Galaction.

=== Comintern and reformist split ===
The major issue splitting the party involved affiliation to the Comintern, seen by many PS members as a successor to the Second International. In 1920 the party sent representatives to the 2nd World Congress of the Comintern in Moscow, were they engaged in prolonged talks over the issue of affiliation with Christian Rakovsky, Grigory Zinoviev, and Nikolai Bukharin. These were Cristescu, Dobrogeanu-Gherea, David Fabian, and Constantin Popovici; the two delegates representing the Socialist Party of Transylvania and Banat were Eugen Rozvan and Flueraş — as a former member of the National Romanian Council in Transylvania, Flueraş was deemed a "class enemy" by the Comintern.

Specifically, Bukharin called on the PS to accept the policy changes theorized by Vladimir Lenin (the so-called 21 points), to exclude Flueraş and others, to submit itself to supervision from the Comintern's Balkan Communist Federation, to vote in a new Central Committee, and to guarantee that Socialismul would be turned into a communist newspaper. According to journalist Victor Frunză, an additional and hotly contested demand involved submitting trade unions to party control.

Dobrogeanu-Gherea, Popovici, and Cristescu met with Lenin, who urged them to adopt the resolution in this form, while allegedly making some promises to preserve a certain degree of autonomy for the Romanian group. Returned to Bucharest, Flueraş called on the party to return to a reformist stance and support for Greater Romania; together with the similarly-minded Iosif Jumanca, he severed all links with the PS in after its Conference of January–February 1921 (they were later followed by George Grigorovici).

=== May Congress ===
At the same time, the maximalist wing, led by Cristescu (who renounced his reserves after first engaging in a heated polemic with Rozvan), passed the resolution to join the Comintern and accept Lenin's 21 points. The Cominternist motion was drafted with support from 18 out of 38 members of the General Council, and submitted to the Congress which took place after 8 May, with the maximalist faction adopting the name of Socialist-Communist Party (PCdR).

According to sources, during the vote on 11 May, advocates of the Comintern had received 428 mandates from a total of 540, and, given the departure of the reformists, represented 51 out of 77 delegates. Commenting on the success of Leninist delegates, historian Adrian Cioroianu and journalist Victor Frunză both attributed it to manipulation of inner-party electoral procedures rather than actual appeal. Such supposition was however not shared by contemporaneous opponents of the affiliation: according to the deposition of reformist leader Iacob Pistiner during the Dealul Spirii Trial, had the PSR leaders failed to affiliate to the Third International, the mass of the party membership would have overridden them. A third PS wing, comprising the centrists who supported conditional affiliation and provided 111 mandates, was marginalized inside the Communist group over the following period.

The procedures were cause for much deliberation: according to his own testimony, the reformist Şerban Voinea, who translated Lenin's 21 points, was accused of having fabricated them as a means to give the Bolsheviks bad press (a fellow delegate shouted that "It was absolutely impossible for the Third International to have voted such a text, with such conditions"), while Boris Stefanov allegedly heckled him, suggesting Voinea leave the PS and join the National Liberal Party ("[he] kept shouting at me [...]: «To the Liberals! To the Liberals!»"). Voinea also left detail on the impact the Congress had on the outside:

The matter had become a slogan with which people would greet each other throughout the city: «Long live the third [International]! Long live the third!». Children would say to one another: «Long live the third!». At the time, it took real civic courage to declare oneself against the IIIrd International.

=== Repression ===
Romanian Army regulars headed by a Royal Commissioner stormed into the Sfântul Ionică building at 15:00 on 12 May 1921; all 51 Socialist-Communist delegates were separated from the group, arrested, and transported to the penal facilities of Jilava and Văcărești. An additional 200 known Socialist-Communist militants were also incarcerated. Among those taken into custody, aside from Cristescu and Stefanov, were Vitali Holostenco, Marcel Pauker, Elena Filipescu, Lucrețiu Pătrășcanu, and Elek Köblös, all of whom were later prominent Communists. The intervention occurred at a time when the floor was taken by Köblös, the PS delegate from Târgu Mureș, who was much later accused of conspiring with the authorities, based on speculation that his speech was in fact a signal.

Authorities prosecuted those arrested (as many as 300 in one account) in the Dealul Spirii Trial, and attempted to connect them with Max Goldstein, a terrorist of uncertain affiliation who had detonated a bomb inside the Romanian Senate on 8 December 1920. Charges were based on the group's rejection of Greater Romania and their advocacy of "World revolution", which had raised suspicion that they were trying to overthrow the existing order through actions such as Goldstein's. In technical terms, this was formulated by the prosecutors as:

Congress overstepped [its] order of the day and submitted to debate affiliation to the Third International, deciding to vote on it.

The instigator for the move was Constantin Argetoianu, Minister of the Interior in the Alexandru Averescu People's Party cabinet, who later admitted that the arrest lacked legal grounds. He also stated that he had given Cristescu approval for the Congress as a means for the arguably illegal motion to be discussed, and evidenced that he had planned to arrest the leaders based on his belief that, once this was accomplished, "all agitation will crumble like an edifice raised on sand". The move provoked mixed reactions inside the executive: according to Argetoianu, Premier Averescu was hesitant, while the Minister of Justice, Grigore Trancu-Iași, advised against it (reason why Argetoianu decided to order the arrest without prior knowledge from his fellow People's Party members, as a fait accompli). Confident, Argetoianu subsequently stated that "Communism is over in Romania".

As the trial was under way, Argetoianu allowed for several Socialist-Communist defendants (including Leonte Filipescu) to be shot while in custody — alleging that they had attempted to flee. Several of the detainees declared they had been beaten, and some were occasionally moved to solitary confinement.

At the 3rd Comintern Congress in July, Karl Radek reported that the Russian Bolshevik government and the international group at large continued to recognize the Socialist-Communist leaders in prison as the official executive body of the Romanian party. Several refugees, mostly natives of Bessarabia, were elected as the party's representatives in Moscow: they included Saul Ozias and Gelber Moscovici. Joining them was Alecu Constantinescu, as the only prominent socialist present. Victor Frunză credited this moment with severing ties between the PS' tradition and the new Bolshevik course; his view was disputed by Vladimir Tismăneanu, who concluded instead that subordination to the Comintern was equally demanded from all pro-Bolshevik PS members.

=== Aftermath and legacy ===
Most of the accused were eventually amnestied on orders King Ferdinand. At their 1922 Congress in Ploieşti, the Socialist-Communists officially established the Communist Party of Romania (PCdR), of which Cristescu was the first general secretary. It was outlawed by the Ion I. C. Brătianu cabinet in April 1924, through the Mârzescu Law (named after its proponent, Minister of Justice Gheorghe Gh. Mârzescu). In 1925, Cristescu himself left the Communist group after clashing with the Balkan Communist Federation over the issue of Greater Romania and being progressively marginalized. The PCdR survived as a marginal grouping in the underground, with much of its leadership taking refuge in the Soviet Union; upon the close of World War II, it was resurrected with the help of Soviet occupation, to become the ruling party of Communist Romania.

Reestablished in January 1922 and led by Ilie Moscovici, Litman Ghelerter and Constantin Popovici, the PS continued to have nominal existence after it merged into the newly created Federation of Romanian Socialist Parties or FPSR (May 1922). Using PS symbolism and reuniting the country's reformist groups, this established its own faction in the Chamber of Deputies, and was represented to the 2½ International. On 7 May 1927, the various groups in the Federation merged to reestablish the Romanian Social Democratic Party (PSD), led by Constantin Titel Petrescu. The Socialist Party, unlike other groups, refused to join the Second International, and affiliated instead with the Paris Bureau (it was joined in this by a group on the PSD's left wing).

Journalist Victor Frună claims the Communists encouraged several myths about the Socialist Party: in 1921, Rakovsky allegedly made the claim that the PCdR had inherited the vast majority of the PS' 40,000 members (such a view was virulently rejected by the FPSR, who credited the PCdR with no more than 500 members, while the Comintern itself eventually reduced the official claim to 2,000 members); in 1951, several years after the Communist Party came to power, its leader Gheorghe Gheorghiu-Dej encouraged the notion that voting on affiliation to the Comintern had occurred on 13 May instead of 12 May (and at a time when most people who voted in favor had already been taken into custody) — this version was interpreted as an attempt to depict the PCdR as a natural successor to the PS.

== Electoral history ==
=== Legislative elections ===
Election	Votes	%	Assembly	Senate	Position
1919			7 / 568	0 / 216	10th
1920			19 / 366	3 / 166	6th
