= Principality of Transylvania =

Principality of Transylvania may refer to:

- Principality of Transylvania (1570–1711), a semi-independent state
- Principality of Transylvania (1711–1867) (from 1765 Grand Principality of Transylvania)

== See also ==
- Transylvania, the historical region
- Transylvania (disambiguation)
- Transylvanian (disambiguation)
