= Alexandru Averescu =

Romanian marshal and populist politician (1859–1938)

Marshal Alexandru Averescu
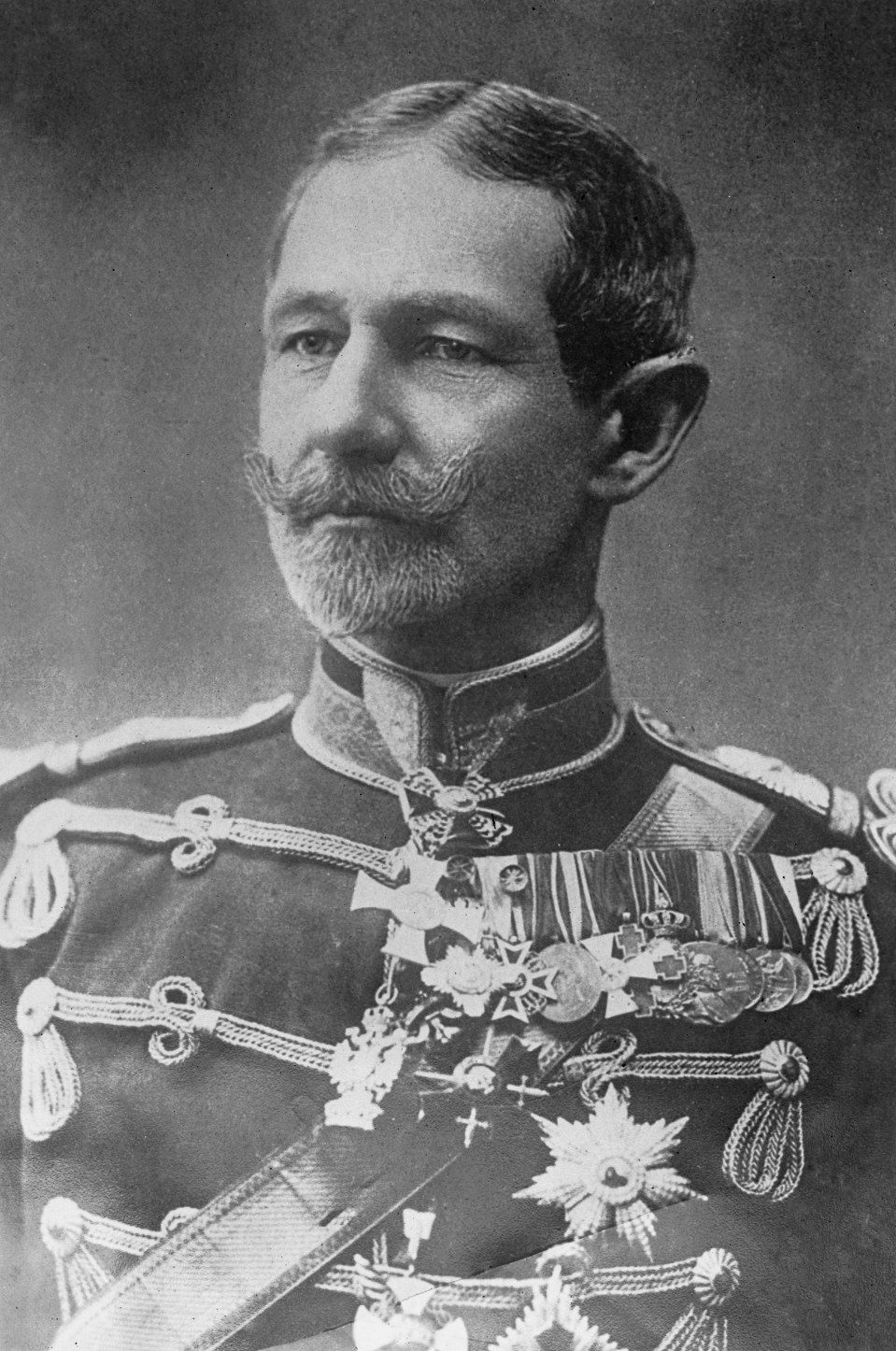
- Averescu c. 1916

24th Prime Minister of Romania
- In office 29 January 1918 – 4 March 1918
- Monarch: Ferdinand I
- Preceded by: Ion I. C. Brătianu
- Succeeded by: Alexandru Marghiloman
- In office 13 March 1920 – 16 December 1921
- Monarch: Ferdinand I
- Preceded by: Alexandru Vaida-Voevod
- Succeeded by: Take Ionescu
- In office 30 March 1926 – 4 June 1927
- Monarch: Ferdinand I
- Preceded by: Ion I. C. Brătianu
- Succeeded by: Barbu Știrbey

Foreign Affairs Minister of Romania
- In office 29 January 1918 – 4 March 1918
- Prime Minister: Himself
- Preceded by: Ion I. C. Brătianu
- Succeeded by: Constantin C. Arion

Chief of the Romanian General Staff
- In office 18 November 1911 – 2 December 1913
- Monarch: Carol I
- Preceded by: Vasile Zottu
- Succeeded by: Constantin Cristescu

Member of the Crown Council
- In office 30 March 1938 – 2 October 1938
- Monarch: Carol II

President of the People's Party
- In office 3 April 1918 – March 1938
- Succeeded by: Petre P. Negulescu

Personal details
- Born: 9 March 1859 Babele, United Principalities (today Ozerne, Ukraine)
- Died: 2 October 1938 (aged 79) Bucharest, Romania
- Party: People's Party
- Spouse: Clotilda Averescu
- Profession: Officer

Military service
- Allegiance: Kingdom of Romania
- Branch/service: Romanian Land Forces
- Rank: Marshal of Romania
- Commands: First Infantry Division; Second Army Corps; Second Army; Third Army
- Battles/wars: Romanian War of Independence; 1907 Romanian peasants' revolt; Second Balkan War; World War I; Flămânda Offensive; Battle of Bazargic; First Battle of Cobadin; Battle of the Southern Carpathians; Battle of Râmnicu Sărat; Battle of Mărăști; Battle of Mărășești; Third Battle of Oituz

Alexandru Averescu (Romanian pronunciation: [alekˈsandru aveˈresku]; 9 March 1859 – 2 October 1938) was a Romanian marshal, diplomat and populist politician. A Romanian Armed Forces Commander during World War I, he served as Prime Minister of three separate cabinets (as well as being interim Foreign Minister in January–March 1918 and Minister without portfolio in 1938). He first rose to prominence during the peasants' revolt of 1907, which he helped repress with violence. Credited with engineering the defense of Moldavia in the 1916–1917 Campaign, he built on his popularity to found and lead the successful People's Party, which he brought to power in 1920–1921, with backing from King Ferdinand I and the National Liberal Party (PNL), and with the notable participation of Constantin Argetoianu and Take Ionescu.

His controversial first mandate, marked by a political crisis and oscillating support from the PNL's leader Ion I. C. Brătianu, played a part in legislating land reform and repressed communist activities, before being brought down by the rally of opposition forces. His second term of 1926–1927 brought a much-debated treaty with Fascist Italy, and fell after Averescu gave clandestine backing to the ousted Prince Carol. Faced with the People Party's decline, Averescu closed deals with various right-wing forces and was instrumental in bringing Carol back to the throne in 1930. Relations between the two soured over the following years, and Averescu clashed with his fellow party member Octavian Goga over the king's attitudes. Shortly before his death, he and Carol reconciled, and Averescu joined the Crown Council.

Averescu, who authored over 12 works on various military topics (including his memoirs from the frontline), was also an honorary member of the Romanian Academy and an Order of Michael the Brave recipient. He became a Marshal of Romania in 1930.

== Early life and career ==
Averescu was born in Babele, United Principalities of Moldavia and Wallachia (later renamed to Alexandru Averescu, today Ozerne, a village northwest of Izmail, Ukraine). The son of Constantin Averescu, who held the rank of sluger, he studied at the Romanian Orthodox seminary in Izmail, then at the School of Arts and Crafts in Bucharest (intending to become an engineer). He had partial Gagauz ancestry. In 1876, he decided to join the Gendarmes in Izmail.

Seeing action as a cavalry sergeant with the Romanian troops engaged in the Russo-Turkish War of 1877–1878, he was decorated on several occasions, but was later moved to reserve (after failing his medical examination due to the effects of frostbite). He was, however, reinstated later in 1878, and subsequently received a military education in Romania, at the military school of Târgoviște (Dealu Monastery), and in Italy, at the Military Academy of Turin. Averescu married an Italian opera singer, Clotilda Caligaris, who had been the prima donna of La Scala. His future collaborator and rival Constantin Argetoianu stated that Averescu "chose Mrs. Clotilda at random".

Upon his return, Averescu steadily climbed through the ranks. He was head of the Bucharest Military Academy (1894–1895), and, in 1895–1898, Romania's military attaché in the German Empire; a colonel in 1901, he was advanced to the rank of brigadier general and became head of the Tecuci regional Army Command Center in 1906.

Before the First World War, he led the troops in crushing the 1907 peasants' revolt — where he engaged in using very harsh means of repression, especially when dealing with soldiers who refused to fight against the rebels — and was subsequently Minister of War in Dimitrie Sturdza's National Liberal Party (PNL) cabinet (1907–1909). According to the recollections of Eliza Brătianu, a split occurred between him and the PNL after Averescu attempted to advance various political goals — the conflict erupted when he sought support with King Carol I and then, as the National Liberals deeply resented Romania's alliance with the Central Powers, he approached the Germans for backing.

Subsequently, he was commander of the First Infantry Division (stationed in Turnu Severin) and, later, of the Second Army Corps in Craiova. In 1912, he became a major general, and, in 1911–1913, he was Chief of the General Staff. In the latter capacity, Averescu organized the actions of Romanian troops operating south of the Danube in the Second Balkan War (the campaign against Bulgaria, during which his troops met no resistance).

== World War and first cabinet ==
During the First World War (which Romania entered in 1916), General Alexandru Averescu led the Second Romanian Army in the successful defense of the Predeal Pass, and was then moved to the head of the Third Army (following the latter's defeat in the Battle of Turtucaia). He commanded Army Group South in the Flămânda operation against the Third Bulgarian Army and other forces of the Central Powers, ultimately stopped by the German offensive (Averescu's forces did not register important losses, and orderly retreated to Moldavia, where Romanian authorities had taken refuge from the successful German operations).

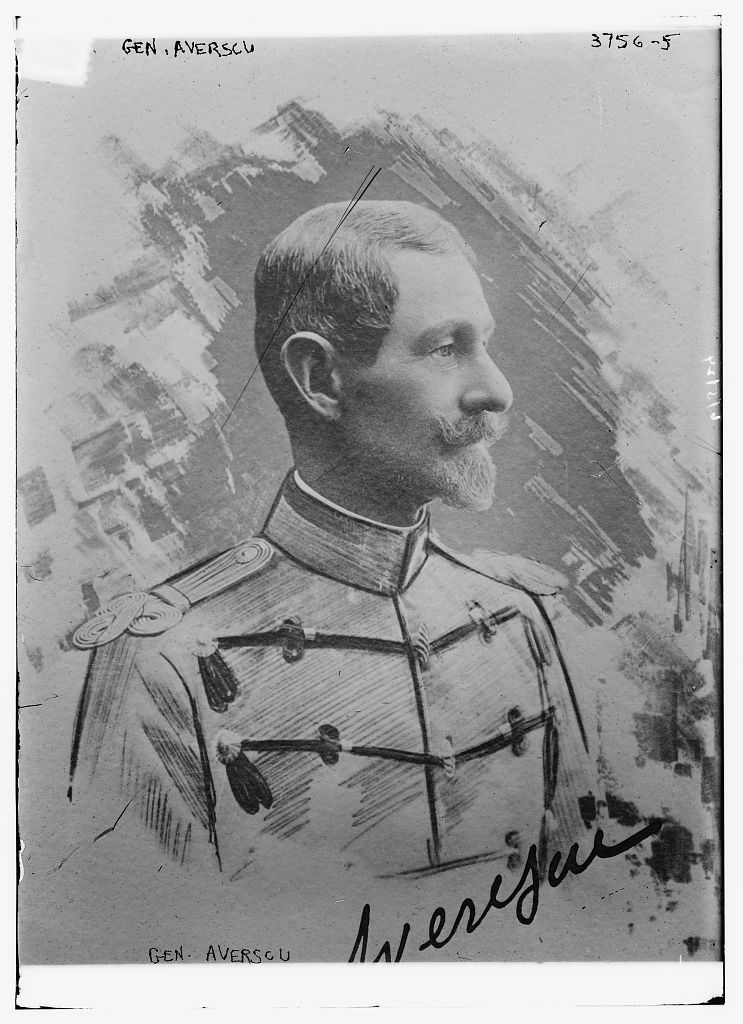
General Averescu

Averescu again led the Second Army to victory in the Battle of Mărăști (August 1917); his achievements, including his brief breakthrough at Mărăști, were considered impressive by public opinion and his officers. However, several military historians rate Averescu and his fellow Romanian generals very poorly, arguing that, overall, their direction of the war "could not have been worse". Despite controlling an army of 500,000 plus 100,000 Russian reinforcements, they were defeated by a German-Austrian-Bulgarian army of 910,000 in less than four months of combat.

"The strictness of General Averescu is well known in his army... There is no pardon for a coward, whoever he may be. I was present a few days ago at the execution of a wealthy young cavalry reserve officer. He retired his detachment from a position without reason or order; he was tried and shot four days later. If General Averescu is strict with delinquents, the brave know that they will find in him their best friend and protector. His contact with the army under him is so close that he gets to know of the smallest act of bravery, and rewards, as far as possible personally, the man who has done it."

— the correspondent of The Times from Rumanian headquarters, February 10, 1917

Averescu was widely seen as the person behind a relatively successful resistance to further offensives on Moldavia (the single piece of territory still held by the Romanian state), and he was considered by many of his contemporaries to have stood in contrast to what was seen as endemic corruption and incompetence. The state of affairs, together with the October Revolution in Russia, was to be blamed for the eventual Romanian surrender to the Central Powers; promoted Premier by King Ferdinand I during the period of crisis, Averescu began armistice talks with August von Mackensen in Buftea and Focșani, but was vehemently opposed to the terms — he resigned, leaving the Alexandru Marghiloman cabinet when it signed the Treaty of Bucharest. Despite Averescu's talks yielding no result, he was repeatedly attacked by his political adversaries for having initiated them.

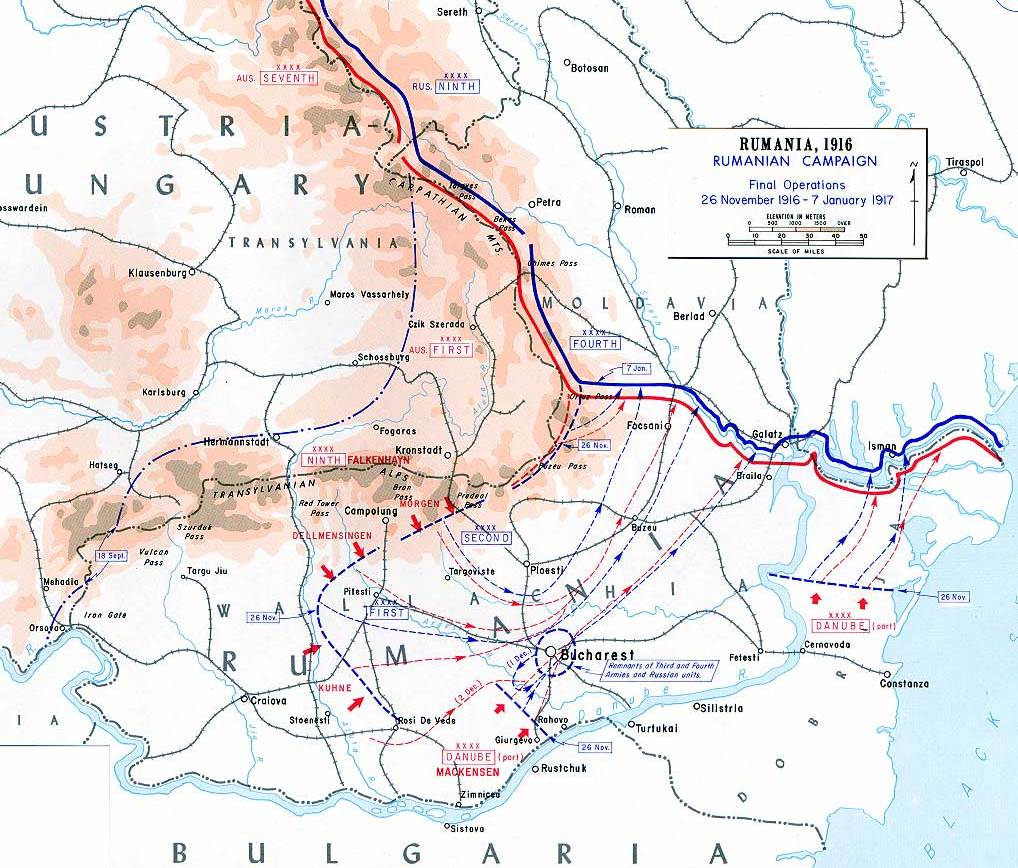
The Romanian Front in late 1916-early 1917

During the period, he also faced a Russian Bolshevik military action: just before Averescu came to power, as Russia's Leon Trotsky negotiated the Treaty of Brest-Litovsk with Germany, the Rumcherod administrative body in Odessa, led by Christian Rakovsky, ordered an offensive from the east into Romania. In order to prevent further losses, Averescu signed his name to a much-criticized temporary armistice with the Rumcherod; eventually, Rakovsky was himself faced with a German offensive (sparked by the temporary breakdown of negotiations at Brest-Litovsk), and had to abandon both his command and the base in Odessa.

== People's Party ==
=== Character ===
Averescu quit the army in the spring of 1918, aiming for a career in politics — initially, with a message that was hostile to the National Liberal Party (PNL) and its leader Ion I. C. Brătianu.

He presided over the People's Party (initially named People's League), and he was immensely popular especially among peasants after the end of the war. His force had an appealing populist message, translated into vague promises and relying on the image of the General: peasants had been promised land at the beginning of the war (and they were being rewarded with it at the very moment, through an agrarian reform that reached its full scope in 1923); they had formed the larger part of the Army, and had come to see Averescu as the one to fulfill their expectations, as well as a figure who was still commanding their allegiance. Eliza Brătianu, the PNL leader's wife, placed Averescu's ascension in the context of Greater Romania's creation through the addition of Bessarabia, Bukovina, and Transylvania (while making use of the condescending National Liberal tone towards the Romanian National Party that was emerging triumphant in previously Austro-Hungarian Transylvania):

"[The] so very harsh losses [during the war], the defeats suffered by the Old Kingdom, the traces of foreign domination in the newly acquired provinces, but most of all the state of unhealthy euphoria that had taken hold of Transylvania, who had begun, in all good faith, to believe that only she had made the union happen, all of these have created a sort of insecurity within the borders of [Greater Romania]."

As the movement initially tended to describe itself as a social trend rather than a political party, it also attracted former members of the Conservative Party (such as Constantin Argetoianu, Constantin Garoflid, and Take Ionescu), military men such as Constantin Coandă, the Democratic Nationalist Party leader A. C. Cuza, the notorious dirigisme supporters Mihail Manoilescu and Ștefan Zeletin, the moderate nationalist Duiliu Zamfirescu, the future diplomat Citta Davila, the journalist D. R. Ioaniţescu, the left-wing agrarian Petru Groza, the Bukovinian leader Iancu Flondor, and the lawyer Petre Papacostea. Additional support came from Transylvanian activists such as Octavian Goga and Teodor Mihail, who had previously left the Romanian National Party there in protest over the policies of its president Iuliu Maniu. Nevertheless, the People's Party did attempt to approach Maniu for an alliance at various intervals after summer 1919 (according to Argetoianu, their attempts were frustrated by King Ferdinand I, whose relationship with Maniu was cordial at the time, and who allegedly stated "Maniu is no one else's! Maniu is mine!").

The grouping also established close links with Garda Conștiinței Naționale (GCN, "The National Awareness Guard"), a reactionary group formed by the electrician Constantin Pancu, engaged in violence against communist activists in Iași (the latter were feared by Averescu as well). Nevertheless, in late 1919, Averescu and Argetoianu approached the Socialist Party of Romania and its associate, the Social Democratic Party of Transylvania and Banat, with an offer for collaboration, negotiating the matter with the parties' reformist leaders — Ioan Flueraș, Ilie Moscovici, and Iosif Jumanca. At the time, Argetoianu claimed, his conversations with Moscovici revealed the fact that the latter was growing suspicious of the party's far left wing, where "the blanket-maker Cristescu and others were agitating". Averescu proposed merging the two parties, as a distinct section, into the People's Party; he was refused, and talks broke down when the general expected the Socialists to support his electoral platform.

=== Impact ===
According to Eliza Brătianu (who was comparing Averescu with the French rebel soldier Georges Boulanger), several voices inside his movement called on Averescu to lead a republican coup d'état against King Ferdinand and his wife — a move allegedly prevented only by the general's loyalism. Argetoianu, who admitted that "I shook hands with Averescu [...] expecting a dictatorial regime", claimed that, during his stay in Italy, the general had been decisively influenced by Radicalism and the Risorgimento movement. This, in Argetoianu's view, was the cause for his repeated involvement in conspiracies; he recalled that, in 1919, Davila's house was the scene of regular reunion of officers, who plotted Brătianu's ousting and pondered dethroning the king (in this version of events, Averescu initially accepted to be proclaimed dictator, but, around October of that year, called on conspirators to renounce their plan).

Aiming to answer most of Romania's social and political issues, the League's founding document called for:

"A land reform, with the passage of the land which is at the moment expropriated only on principle [ - a reference to the 1917 promise for a land reform] into the effective and immediate ownership of villagers through the means of communes; an electoral reform, through universal suffrage, direct election, secret ballot, and compulsory voting, with representation given to ethnic minorities, since the latter would not hinder the free manifestation of political individualities; administrative decentralization."

According to Argetoianu,

"in the autumn of 1919, [Averescu's] popularity had reached its peak. In the villages, people would dream of him, some swore that they had seen him descending from an airplane into their midst, others, who had fought in the war, told that they had lived by his side in the trenches, it was through him that hopes were solidified, and he was expected of to provide a miracle for people to live a carefree and fulfilling life. His popularity was something mystical, something supernatural, and all sorts of legends had begun to surround this Messiah of the Romanian people."

Although he was also Prime Minister of Romania for three mandates (1918, 1920–1921, 1926–1927), his political success is not as spectacular as the military one. Averescu ended up as one of the pawns maneuvered by Brătianu. Argetoianu later repeatedly expressed his distaste for Averescu's hesitant stance and openness to compromise.

== Second cabinet ==
=== Establishment ===
Initially, Brătianu approached Averescu using their shared displeasure over the Alexandru Vaida-Voevod Romanian National Party (PNR)-Peasants' Party (PȚ) cabinet; the National Liberals managed to obtain the general's renunciation of his goal to prosecute their party for alleged mis-management of Romania before and during the war, as well as his promise to respect the 1866 Constitution of Romania when carrying out the planned land reform. At the same time, Brătianu kept a tight relationship with King Ferdinand.

On 13 March 1920, he gave news of the Vaida-Voevod cabinet's dissolution, and was widely expected to call for early elections as soon as this had happened. Instead, he read a document convened with King Ferdinand, which suspended Parliament (the first legislative body in Greater Romania) for ten days — the measure was intended to give Averescu the time to negotiate a new majority in the chambers. These moves caused a vocal response from the opposition: Nicolae Iorga, who was president of the Chamber of Deputies and sided with the National Party, called for a motion of no confidence to be passed on 26 March; in return, Averescu obtained the support of the monarch in dissolving the Parliament, and invested his cabinet's energies into winning the early elections by enlisting the help of county-level officials (local administration came to be dominated by People's Party officials). It carried the vote with 206 seats (223 together with Take Ionescu's Conservative-Democratic Party).

As agreements between the PNR and PȚ broke down (with the PNR awaiting for new developments), the PȚ joined Iorga's party, the Democratic Nationalists, in creating the Federation of National-Social Democracy (which also drew support from the group around Nicolae L. Lupu).

=== Policies ===
His mandate was marked by the signing of the Treaty of Trianon with Hungary, and initial steps leading to the creation of the Little Entente—formed by Romania with Czechoslovakia and the Kingdom of Serbs, Croats and Slovenes. It was also at this stage that Romania and the Second Polish Republic inaugurated their military alliance (see Polish–Romanian alliance). The goal to create a cordon sanitaire against Bolshevist Russia also brought him and his Minister of the Interior Argetoianu to oversee repression measures against the group of Socialist Party of Romania members who voted in favor of joining the Comintern (arrested on suspicion of "attempt against the state's security" on 12 May 1921). This came after a long debate in Parliament over the imprisonment of Mihai Gheorghiu Bujor, a Romanian citizen who had joined the Russian Red Army in Bessarabia during the later stages of the October Revolution, and who had been tried for treason. Argetoianu, who proclaimed communism to be "over in Romania", later indicated that Averescu and other members of the cabinet were hesitant about the crackdown, and that he ultimately resorted to taking initiative for the arrests — thus presenting his fellow politicians with a fait accompli.

The regions coming under Romania's administration at the end of the war still maintained their ad hoc administrative structures, including the Transylvanian Directory Council, set up and dominated by the PNR; Averescu ordered these dissolved in April, facing protest from local notabilities. At the same time, he ordered all troops to be demobilized. He unified currency around the Romanian leu, and imposed a land reform in the form in which it was to be carried out by the new Brătianu executive. In fact, the latter measure had been imposed by the outgoing PNL cabinet through the order of Ion G. Duca, in a manner which Argetoianu described as "destructive". As an initial step, Averescu's government appointed the noted activist Vasile Kogălniceanu, a deputy for Ilfov County, as rapporteur; Kogălniceanu used this position to give an account of the agrarian situation in Romania, stressing the role played by his ancestor, Constantin, in abolishing Moldavian serfdom, as well as that of his father, Mihail Kogălniceanu, in eliminating corvées throughout Romania.

The People's Party found itself hard pressed to limit the effects of the reform as promised by Duca — reason why Constantin Garoflid, seen by Argetoianu as "the Conservative and theorist of large-scale landed property", was promoted as Minister of Agriculture. Argetoianu also accused the Premier of endorsing reform in an even more radical shape, and contended that:

"[...] peasants blessed «father Averescu», who gave them land, and rallied around him even tighter. Brătianu, Duca, they were nowhere mentioned except in curses. O, human gratitude!"

In October 1920, Averescu reached an agreement with the Allied Powers, recognizing Bessarabia's union with Romania — expressing a hope for the Bolshevik government to be overthrown, it also imposed the region's cession on a projected democratic government in Russia (while calling for further negotiations between it and Romania); throughout the interwar period, the Soviet Union refused to bind itself to the provisions of the agreement. Italy also refused to ratify the document, citing, alongside various foreign interests (including its friendship with the Soviet Union), the 250 million Italian lire owed to Italian investors in Romanian state bonds.

=== Scandals and fall ===
In March 1921, Argetoianu became implicated in a scandal involving the actions of his associate Aron Schuller, who had attempted to contract a 20 million lire loan with a bank in Italy, using as collateral Romanian war bonds that he had illegally obtained from the Finance Ministry reserve.

With Nicolae Titulescu as Finance Minister, Averescu resumed the interventionist course in economic policies, but broke with tradition when he attempted to legislate a major increase in taxes and proposed nationalizations — with potential negative effects on the PNL-voting middle class. The National Liberals, through the voice of Alexandru Constantinescu-Porcu, helped exploit the rivalry between the Peasants' Party and Iorga, using the latter's rejection of Constantin Stere (a conflict sparked by Stere's support for Germany during the World War); Stere won partial elections for the deputy seat in Soroca, Bessarabia, causing a political scandal which saw all parties (including the PNR) declare their dissatisfaction. The conflict worsened during a prolonged parliamentary debate over Averescu's proposal to nationalize enterprises in Reșița (an initiative the opposition mistrusted, alleging that the new owners were to be People's Party members), when Argetoianu addressed a mumbled insult to the Peasant Party's Virgil Madgearu. Ion G. Duca of the PNL expressed his sympathies to Madgearu (who had repeated out an obscene word whispered by Argetoianu), and all opposition groups appealed to Ferdinand, asking for Averescu's recall (14 July 1921).

Ferdinand then attempted to facilitate a fusion between the Romanian National Party and the National Liberals, but negotiations broke down after disagreements over the possible leadership. Eventually, Brătianu convened with Ferdinand his return to power, and the king called on Foreign Minister Take Ionescu to resign, thus causing a political crisis that profited the PNL and put an end to the Averescu cabinet.

Shows of popular support in Bucharest were called of by Averescu himself, after he had negotiated with Brătianu for a People's Party cabinet to be formed "at a proper time". Ionescu took over as premier until late January 1922, when he was replaced by Brătianu.

== Third cabinet ==
=== New political alliances ===
In early 1926, the general was again named Premier, and approached the PNR and its close ally, the Peasants' Party, proposing a merger around his leadership. This met with a stiff refusal, as it seemed that the two were about to win the elections with additional support, but the king, suspicious of the left-wing credentials of the Peasants' Party, used his Royal Prerogative and nominated Averescu as premier (with PNL support).

Averescu's party was instead joined by PNR dissidents, Vasile Goldiș and Ioan Lupaș, who represented a Romanian Orthodox segment of the Transylvanian voters (rather than the Greek Catholics supporting Iuliu Maniu). The 1926 elections, which Averescu's cabinet organized in March and won with a landslide (269 mandates) also brought a massive defeat for the PNL, who held just 16 seats in the Chamber of Deputies.

=== Italian-Romanian Treaty ===
Although not fascist itself, the new government he formed displayed gestures of friendship towards Benito Mussolini's Fascist Italy, a state which advertised itself as a rising force — The Nation called Averescu "Romania's Mussolini", as "an epithet which the new premier of Rumania bestowed upon himself". Contacts established (as early as June 1926, when Mihail Manoilescu had negotiated a loan in Rome) were one of the major points of divergence between the policies of Averescu and those of Brătianu: the former attempted to overcome the embarrassment provoked by Mussolini when, due to Romania's debt, the Italian government had recalled the ambassador and had refused to permit King Ferdinand's pre-convened visit.

The loan convened by Manoilescu and Mussolini made important concessions to Italy in return for a clarification of Romania's debt status; it also led to the signing of a five-year "Friendship Treaty" (16 September), widely condemned by Romanian public opinion for not having called on Italy to state its support for Romanian rule in Bessarabia, and created tension inside the Little Entente (Yugoslavia feared that Italy had attempted to gain Romania's neutrality in case of a potential irredentist conflict). Writing at the time, Constantin Vișoianu also criticized the vague terms in which the sections of the document dealing with mutual defense had been drafted:

"What have we gained from Italy through this pact? Nothing. In truth, article 3 — which does not [even] refer to Bessarabia — makes provisions for the eventuality of a violent incursion and organizes a mutual assistance system [that is] original through its Platonic love-like character."

The treaty expired in 1932, and, after being prolonged by six months, it was not renewed. Overall, the political impact of contacts was minor, given that the Italians mistrusted the Romanian movement for its traditional role as instrument for Brătianu. Referring to the parallel project to marry Princess Ileana to Prince Umberto of Italy, Averescu himself allegedly stated: "I didn't get much from Italy except a throne for a Princess of Rumania".

=== Averescu's controversial projects ===
Averescu continued to offer his support to far-right groups (especially to the National-Christian Defense League formed by A. C. Cuza, his early collaborator), and probably considered assuming dictatorial powers.

The cabinet clashed with Brătianu when it was discovered that it had been negotiating in secret with the disinherited Prince Carol (a traditional adversary of the PNL) as Ferdinand's health was taking a turn for the worse (Averescu later claimed that he had been asked by Brătianu: "So, after I have brought you to power, you wish to rise and dominate?"). The PNL withdrew its support, and, through an order signed by Constantin Hiott, Averescu's was replaced by the broad coalition government of Barbu Știrbey, Brătianu's brother-in-law. The general's deposition, confirmed by King Ferdinand on his deathbed, created a vacuum on the Right, soon filled by the Iron Guard, a fascist movement formed by Corneliu Zelea Codreanu (formerly an associate of Cuza's).

== Late 1920s politics ==
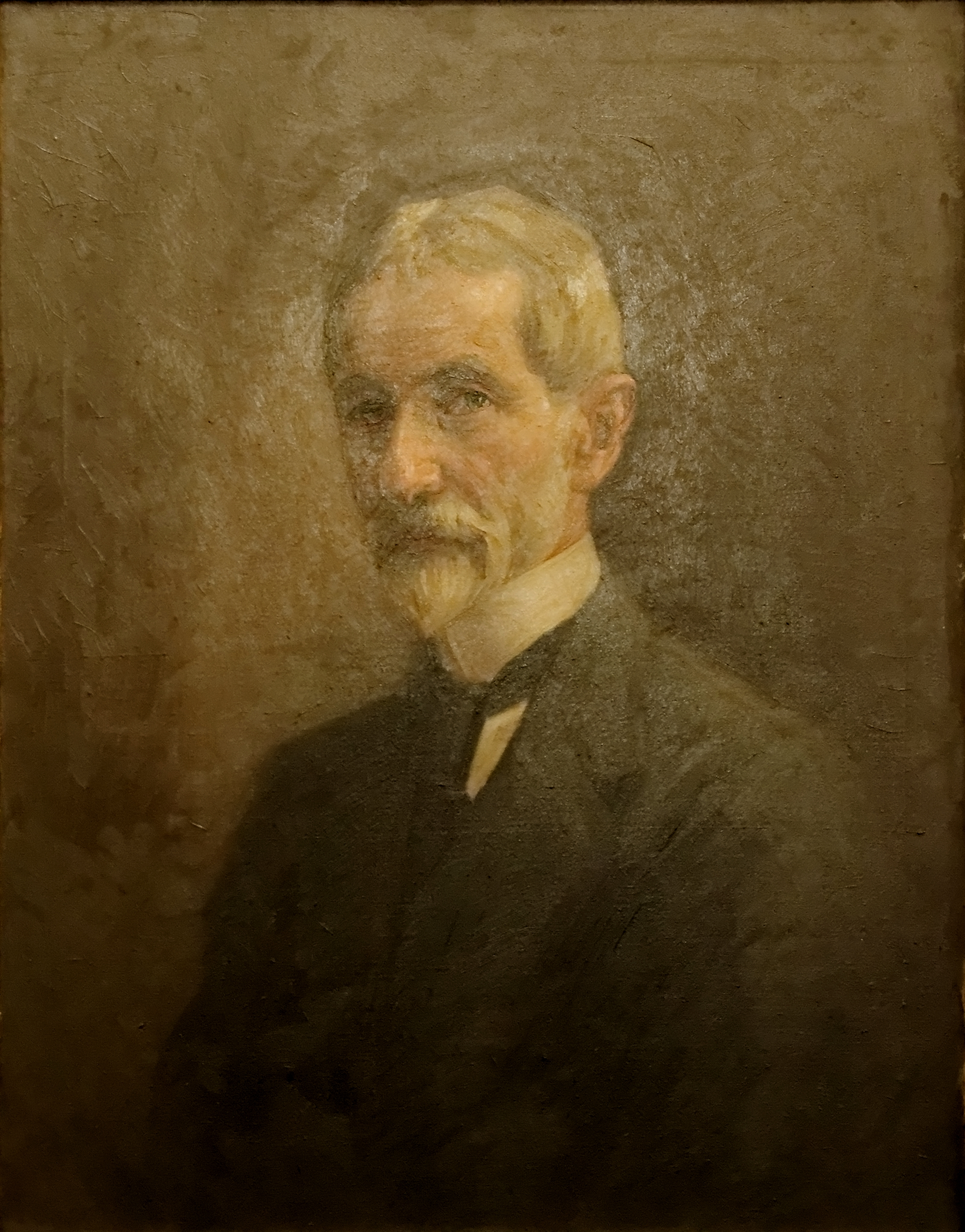
Averescu

The People's Party involved itself in solving the dynastic crisis after Ferdinand's death in July 1927, again approaching Carol to replace the child-king Michael and Prince Nicholas' regency. In November 1927, Averescu took the stand in the trial of his supporter Mihail Manoilescu, who was arrested after having incited pro-Carol sentiment; in his testimony, he backed the notion that, despite his initial anger, Ferdinand had ultimately planned to have Carol return to the throne.

His grouping lost much of its supporters to the newly formed National Peasants' Party, and scored under 2% in the 1927 elections. Around 1930, Averescu began opposing the universal suffrage he had endorsed earlier, and issued an appeal to the intellectuals in order to have it discarded from legislation on the basis that it was easily influenced by the parties in power. He and his supporter, the pro-authoritarian poet Octavian Goga, received criticism from the left-wing Poporanist journal Viața Românească, who claimed that Averescu had in fact provoked and encouraged widespread electoral irregularities during his time in office.

In November 1930, he filed a complaint against the poet and journalist Bazil Gruia, claiming that the latter had libeled him by publishing, in January, an article in Chemarea which began by questioning the People's Party claim that Averescu was "the only honest comrade of the Romanian peasant" and contrasted it with the general's activities during the 1907 Revolt. The trial was held in Cluj, and Gruia was represented in court by Radu R. Rosetti. On 1 December, Gruia was found guilty and sentenced to 15 days in a correctional facility with reprieve, and to a fine of 3,000 lei (soon after, Gruia benefited from a pardon).

Averescu was promoted to Marshal of Romania in the same year, during the time when Carol returned to rule as King — the appointment was attributed by Time to his political support for the latter's return. According to the same source, by the end of 1930, Averescu was again at the center of Romanian politics, owing to Carol's favor, to the deaths of Ion I. C. and Vintilă Brătianu, and to the unexpected support he gained from the PNL dissident Gheorghe I. Brătianu.

== Final years ==
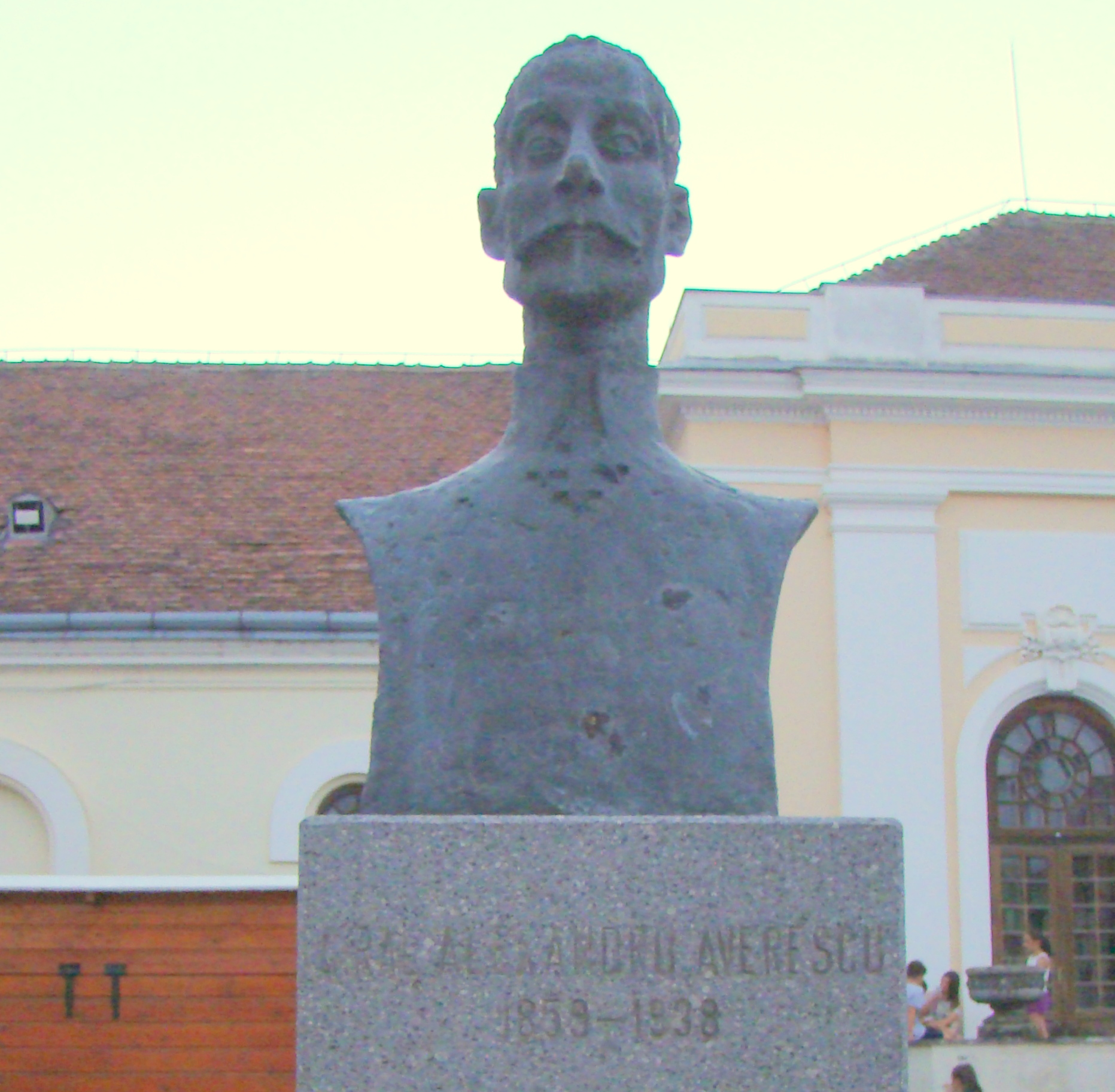
Bust of Alexandru Averescu in Alba Iulia

He ultimately showed himself hostile to Carol's inner circle, and especially to the king's lover Magda Lupescu; consequently, Goga was instigated by Carol to take over as leader of the People's Party, and the latter attacked Averescu for "subverting [...] the traditional respect enjoyed by the Crown". The clash led to Goga's creation of the splinter National Agrarian Party, which, although never an important force, obtained more of the vote in the 1932 elections (approx. 3% compared to Averescu's 2%).

Around 1934, as the Guard proclaimed its allegiance to Nazi Germany, the Italians (still rivals of Adolf Hitler), approached Averescu (as well as Manoilescu, Nicolae Iorga, Nichifor Crainic, Cuza, Goga, and other non-Guardist reactionaries), with an offer for collaboration (see Comitati d'azione per l'universalità di Roma). This apparent alliance was, in fact, marked by major dissensions — Averescu and Iorga were routinely attacked by Crainic's Calendarul. Eventually, Averescu's group formed, in 1934, the Constitutional Front, a nationalist electoral alliance with the National Liberal Party-Brătianu, which was joined by Mihai Stelescu's Crusade of Romanianism (an Iron Guard offshoot), and the minor party created by Grigore Forțu (the Citizen Bloc); after the latter two parties disappeared, the Front survived in its original form until 1936, when it disbanded.

In 1937, despite his ongoing feud with Carol, Averescu was appointed a member of the Crown Council. Argetoianu recalled that he and the Marshal had reconciled — at a time when Argetoianu pondered rallying all opposition forces, including the National Peasants' Party, the National Liberal Party-Brătianu, and the Iron Guard, in a single electoral bloc (before the general election of December, the various groups successfully negotiated an electoral pact against the government of Gheorghe Tătărescu). Averescu, who, according to Argetoianu, declared was more interested in convincing Carol to allow his estranged wife Elena of Greece to return to Romania, remained opposed to the deal.

The following year, he was briefly minister without portfolio in the cabinet of Premier Miron Cristea, created by Carol to combat the ascension of the Iron Guard, and opposed the monarch's option to renounce the 1923 Constitution and proclaim his dictatorship (the latter move signaled the end of the People's Party), but was among the figures displayed by Carol's regime. He died soon after in Bucharest, and was buried in the World War I heroes' crypt in Mărăști. In December, the king created the National Renaissance Front as the political instrument of his authoritarian rule.

== Bibliography ==
- Otu, Petre; Georgescu, Maria (2022). Durchleuchtung eines Verrats Der Fall des Oberst Alexandru D. Sturdza [Examination of a treason. The Case of Colonel Alexandru D. Sturdza] (in German). Hainburg: Lektor. ISBN 9783941866089. OCLC 1335552122.
- Otu, Petre; Bucur, Viorel V. (2012). Alexandru Averescu Marschall, Politiker, Legende [Alexandru Averescu Marshal, Politician, Legend] (in German). Hainburg/Hessen: Lektor. ISBN 9783941866027. OCLC 815951423.
