= Banater Arbeiter-Presse =

Socialist newspaper in the Banat

- Founded: 1925
- Ceased publication: 1927
- Political alignment: Banat Socialist Party
- Language: German language
- Sister newspapers: Arbeiter-Zeitung

Banater Arbeiter-Presse ('Banat Workers Press') was a German language socialist newspaper published from Jimbolia, Romania between 1925 and 1927. The first issue of Banater Arbeiter-Presse was published on July 3, 1925. The newspaper was published weekly. Banater Arbeiter-Presse was an organ of the Banat Socialist Party. Banater Arbeiter-Presse was of great help for the socialist movement in Jimbolia, helping the party to win the local elections of 1926.
