= Leonte Filipescu =

- Born: 1895; Tagu, Buzău County, Kingdom of Romania
- Died: March 26, 1922 (aged 26–27); Jilava, Kingdom of Romania
- Occupations: Journalist; socialist militant; printer
- Known for: Early leader of the Socialist Party of Romania and precursor to the Romanian Communist Party
- Political party: Socialist Party of Romania

Leonte Filipescu (September 18, 1895 – April 13, 1922) was one of the leaders of the early Romanian communist movement, shot in custody by the Romanian authorities.

Leonte Filipescu was born in a family of workers in Bârlad, Romania. He worked from an early age, first as a dock labourer in the port of Galați, and after 1910 as a waiter in Bucharest, Romania's capital. In Bucharest he met several trade unionist active in the waiter's guild, such as Gheorghe Niculescu-Mizil, Iancu Olteanu, and Marian Cristescu, who introduced him to socialist ideas. He took part in several waiters' protests, and, after the start of World War I, in the anti-war demonstrations organised in Bucharest by the Socialists. In the meantime, he also joined the Social Democratic Party, sitting on its far left wing.

As Romania joined the war on the side of the Entente in 1916, Leonte Filipescu was drafted and sent to the front, but was soon captured by the German Army and interned in a concentration camp. He succeeded in escaping along with several prisoners, and by the spring of 1917 he was back in Bucharest, taking part in the demonstration organised by the Socialists in front of the German Army Headquarters in occupied Romania. In 1918 he was one of the editors of the socialist manifest Trăiască Socialismul ("Long live Socialism"), and advocated its distribution by bypassing the military censorship.

In the first post-war years, Leonte Filipescu became one of the leaders of the left-wing grouping of the Socialist Party of Romania, and participated in the organisation of several strikes and mass demonstrations in Bucharest. In July 1919 he began contributing to the left-wing journal Federația, advocating communist revolution and the transformation of the Romanian society into a socialist society. Following the authorities crackdown on the 1920 Romanian general strike, which he helped organise, he went into hiding, while continuing to spread pro-socialist manifestos and pamphlets.

During the January–February 1921 conference of the General Council of the Socialist Party and Trade Unions, Leonte Filipescu was one of the advocates of the party's affiliation with the Third International, and its transformation into a communist party. The same year he went to Iași, in eastern Romania, where he organised, along with Pavel Tcacenco, the Socialist Conference of March 3–6. During the talks, he reiterated his support for the transformation of the Socialist Party into a communist one. Narrowly escaping capture during the crackdown on the Conference, he left for Bulgaria, missing the May Congress of the Socialist Party which saw its transformation into the Communist Party of Romania.

Returning in Romania at the end of July 1921, he found most of the leadership of the Communist Party in prison, so he took part in the organisation of a provisional leadership, assuming the control of the party's youth wing. He worked in gathering support for the communist imprisoned at Jilava, Văcărești, and Doftana among the workers in Bucharest's factories. In October 1921 he was captured by the secret police, and became one of the main defendants in the Dealul Spirii Trial. While in prison, he contracted a severe form of tuberculosis. Due to his health problems, he was granted severance, and was moved to a military prison in Bucharest. In April 1922 he was summoned to appear as a witness in the main trial, and the authorities decided to have him transferred to Jilava Prison, despite Leonte's opposition. On the night of April 13/14, during the transport, he was shot in the head and in the heart, ostensibly because he was attempting to escape. His assassination provoked outrage among Romanian workers and in the press.

In the 1960s, his remains were moved to the Monument of the Heroes for the Freedom of the People and of the Motherland, for Socialism, in what is now Carol Park, in Bucharest, where they remained until 1991. A street in Timișoara now called Nicolae Filipescu bore his name. A street in Voluntari was also named after him, but it now bears the name of Gheorghe Dinică.
