= Ghiță Moscu =

Romanian communist (1889–1937)

Ghiță Moscu (born Gelbert or Gelber Moscovici, also known as Alexandru Bădulescu, Russian: Александр Саимович Бадулеску; 1889 – November 4, 1937) was a Romanian socialist and communist activist, one of the early leaders of the Romanian Communist Party and its permanent delegate to the Third International. He was executed in the Soviet Union during the Great Purge.

== Biography ==
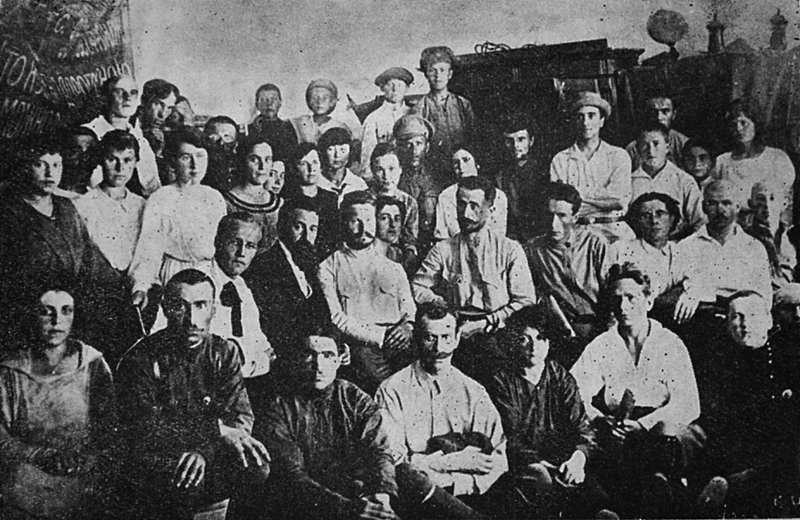
Ghiță Moscu (seated, second row, first from left) along with fellow Romanian Ion Dic Dicescu in the political section of the Turkestan Front, 1919–1920

He was born in a Jewish family in Băiceni, near Iași, in north-eastern Romania. He was the son of an immigrant petty merchant who had fought in the Romanian Independence War. A student of the Iași superior school of commerce until 1910, in 1906 Moscu joined the local socialist România Muncitoare circle, where his older brother, Ilie Moscovici, a future leader of the reformist Romanian Social Democratic Party, was already active. Involved in the youth section, he contributed to the creation of the Circle for the Socialist Education of the Youth, which included young workers as well as school students. Moscu represented the socialists of Pașcani at the 1910 Congress reorganizing the Social Democratic Party of Romania, before being drafted in the autumn of the same year, and participating as a soldier in the Second Balkan War. After demobilization, he moved to Bucharest, where he started working for an insurance company and joined the local socialist section. During the years before the First World War, Moscu was engaged in the pacifist anti-war movement, writing articles in the socialist youth press. In 1915, at the fourth Congress, where he participated as a delegate for Bucharest, Moscu was elected in the party's control commission. In August 1915 he was also elected in the Committee of the newly created commercial employees' trade union. Other political position held during this period include membership in the local Trade Union Commission, the Bucharest Party Committee and the commission for the ideological control of the party's press.

During the war, Moscu gradually moved toward communism, being engaged with the "maximalist" group that chose to continue its activity clandestinely in German-occupied Romania. In 1918 he was arrested in Bucharest by the German military administration and sentenced to four and a half years confinement in Jilava Prison for spreading a manifesto saluting the Russian Revolution. Set free in November 1918, he was arrested again the following month on charges of "attack on public security", after the reinstalled Romanian authorities opened fire on demonstrating workers during a general strike. Moscu left the country in March 1919 and, after a brief internment at Užice, made his way to Austria, where he re-established contact with the Romanian movement. In November he represented the youth wing of the Socialist Party in the Berlin Congress that created the Communist Youth International, signing its founding manifesto in the name of the Working Youth of Romania. After a failed attempt to return to Romania in the summer of 1920, Moscu was finally able to do so during autumn. In Bucharest he became one of the main supporters of the creation of a Communist Party, also organising a conference of the clandestine communist factions in Iași during the spring of 1921. In June 1921 he left Romania for Soviet Russia with his wife Clara (also known under the pseudonym Ana Bădulescu). Moscu, who had by the time adopted the name Bădulescu, headed the Romanian delegation to the Third Congress of the Communist International (Comintern), being elected a member of its Executive Committee (ECCI), as the sole Romanian representative. At the same Congress his wife was elected in the International Communist Women's Secretariat. Afterwards, the couple moved to Moscow, and was active in the Comintern press. Designated the Romanian representative to the Balkan Communist Federation in 1922, Moscu moved to Bulgaria, where the latter organisation had its headquarters. Following the Balkan Conference held in Moscow in autumn 1923, he settled in the Soviet Union and was appointed deputy rapporteur of the ECCI for the Balkan countries. In 1924 he was admitted in the Bolshevik Party, and later that year participated in Romanian Communist Party's third congress, which took place in Vienna. During most of the interwar, Moscu remained the RCP permanent delegate to the Comintern, and in 1927 he was also appointed a member in the Balkan Secretariat of the Comintern.

In 1929, during the intense factional fights which divided the Romanian Communist Party, Moscu left the Comintern apparatus and, after taking some university courses in commerce, he led the international section of the Soviet National Committee of Standardization. After September 1932, when the section was disbanded, he worked as the assistant manager of the international section of the People's Commissariat for Communications of the USSR. Temporarily excluded from the Communist Party, Moscu had to leave this position and start working as a consulting editor for the Co-operative Publishing Society of Foreign Workers in the USSR. Expelled again from the Party in 1935, he was eventually killed in 1937, during the Great Purge, accused of creating a spy ring inside the ECCI. He was later rehabilitated, first in the USSR and then in Romania, during the de-stalinization campaigns in the Eastern Bloc.
