= Transylvanian (disambiguation) =

Transylvanian may refer to:

- anyone or anything related to Transylvania

== Geography ==
- Transylvanian Plain
- Transylvanian Plateau
- Transylvanian Mountains

== History ==
- Transylvanian Principality (1570-1711)
- Transylvanian Principality (1711-1867)
- Transylvanian Military Frontier
- Transylvanian peasant revolt
- Transylvanian voivode
- Transylvanian School
- Transylvanian Memorandum
- Transylvanian unification with Romania (Romanian National Assembly)
- Transylvanian flag and coat of arms

== Linguistics ==
- Transylvanian Romanian
- Transylvanian Saxon dialect
- Transylvanian Romani

== People ==
- Transylvanian Saxons
- Transylvanian Hungarians
- Transylvanian Landler

== Religion ==
- Transylvanian Reformed Diocese
- Transylvanian Unitarian Church

== Institutions ==
- Transylvanian Diet
- Transylvanian Museum
- Transylvanian Museum of Ethnography
- National Museum of Transylvanian History

== Organizations ==
- Transylvanian Peasants' Party
- Group of Transylvanian Saxons
- Association of Transylvanian Saxons in Germany
- Transylvanian Society of Dracula

== Arts ==
- Transylvanian music
- Transylvanian Regurgitations
- Transilvanian Hunger

== Others ==
- Transylvanian mining railway
- Transylvanian rugs
- Transylvanian Hound

== See also ==
- Transylvania (disambiguation)
- Transylvanian Carpathians (disambiguation)
- Transylvanianism
