= Ioan Flueraș =

Romanian politician (1882–1953)

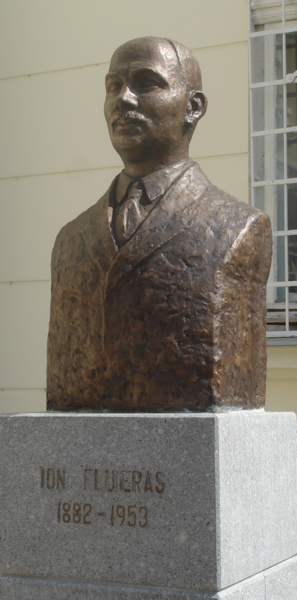
Bust in Alba Iulia.

Ioan (also known as Ion, Flueraș or Fluieraș; 2 November [O.S. 21 October] 1882 – 7 June 1953) was a Romanian social democratic politician and a victim of the communist regime.

== Biography ==
=== Early activities ===
Born in Chereluș (Kerülős), Arad County, in the Crișana region, he trained as a wheelwright and settled in Arad, where he became active in socialist circles. In 1901, he joined the Social Democratic Party of Hungary, and began contributing to its press in Hungary; with Iosif Jumanca and Tiron Albani, he led the Party's ethnic Romanian wing. The latter eventually reformed itself as the Social Democratic Party of Transylvania and Banat. At the time, Flueraș unsuccessfully ran in elections for the Hungarian diet.

Between 1906 and 1914, he was editor-in-chief of Adevărul (the party newspaper), until it was closed down by Hungarian authorities. Living in Budapest, Flueraș was conscripted after the outbreak of World War I, and worked for the Austro-Hungarian Air Service in a factory on Csepel Island.

=== Transylvanian politics ===
In the summer of 1918, he and Jumanca became involved in reestablishing Adevărul, which, inspired by the Fourteen Points, became connected with the fight for emancipation of Romanians in Transylvania and Banat, and their eventual union with Romania. Before the Aster Revolution, Flueraș and Jumanca were charged with contacting the Romanian National Party, negotiations which led, in early October, to the creation of Consiliul Național Român Central (CNRC, the Central Romanian National Council). The CNRC was instrumental in convoking the Great National Assembly of Alba Iulia of December 1, 1918, one which declared Transylvania's secession from the Hungarian Republic, and its will to join with Romania; Flueraș was the Assembly's vice president, and subsequently served as Chief of Department of Social Security and Hygiene in the Directory Council (the de facto government of the region, led by Iuliu Maniu). Among the other Social Democrats in the council were Jumanca, Albani, and Enea Grapini.

On the very day of the Great National Assembly of Alba Iulia, he was elected general secretary of the Social Democratic Party of Transylvania and Banat. Later in the same month, after a strike was worker's rally broken up in Bucharest and the newly created Socialist Party of Romania (PS) repressed, Flueraș and Jumanca, urged by Constantin Titel Petrescu, met with King Ferdinand I and Premier Ion I. C. Brătianu, persuading them to grant concessions to the labor movement. In 1920, he was one of Romania's envoys to the Paris Peace Conference.

=== Interwar Romania ===
In late 1918, the Transylvanian and Banat socialists agreed to join the PS as a distinct section. In late 1919, Flueraș, Jumanca, and Ilie Moscovici carried unsuccessful negotiations for a merger between Alexandru Averescu's People's League and the Socialist groups; talks were mediated by Constantin Argetoianu.

Alongside Gheorghe Cristescu, Alexandru Dobrogeanu-Gherea and others, Flueraș was a delegate to the Second Congress of the Comintern in Moscow, where the matter of the PSR's joining of the international body and its support of Bolshevik lines were debated. The Transylvanian delegates and, as a former member of the Directory Council, Flueraș first and foremost, were the target of Nikolai Bukharin and Christian Rakovsky's attacks, given that they supported a Greater Romania in front of Bolshevik principles; upon their return, Flueraș, Gheorghe Popovici, and others were expelled from the PS (despite Cristescu's reserves) — the remaining group reformed itself as the Romanian Communist Party (PCR).

After the reestablishment of the Romanian Social Democratic Party (PSD) as a socialist group opposed to the PCR, Flueraș served several terms as a party representative to the Chamber of Deputies of Romania. He settled in Bucharest in 1922, and worked for the Labor Ministry. With Moscovici, Șerban Voinea, and Iacob Pistiner, Flueraș represented the PSD to the 1924 Congress of the Labor and Socialist International in Marseille.

When the authoritarian regime of King Carol II was imposed in 1938, he supported the change and remained active in the guilds established by the new corporatist structure of the National Renaissance Front (as a member of the Upper Economic Council and the Senate).

A potential target of Iron Guard reprisals during the National Legionary State, Flueraș survived the Legionnaires' Rebellion, and, upon the Guard's defeat, sent a congratulatory telegram to Conducător Ion Antonescu. He retreated from public life for the rest of World War II.

=== After World War II ===
In early 1945, after the royal coup that toppled Ion Antonescu's pro-Nazi regime and placed Romania in the Allies camp, Flueraș and George Grigorovici founded the Socialist Democratic Party, which claimed legitimacy inside the socialist camp and denounced collaboration with the Communists. It was dissolved in September 1946. Flueraș remained opposed to the main Social Democratic Party (PSD), and accused the growing Soviet influence which had found its advocates inside the latter political group (the wing led by Lothar Rădăceanu and Ștefan Voitec). He also allegedly refused office in the Communist-backed Petru Groza government, and rallied with Constantin Titel Petrescu's Independent Social Democrats, which had split with the PSD over the issue of running common lists with the communists.

He was arrested in late 1948, presented as a dissident PSD member, tried for "having collaborated with a fascist regime", and held in various prisons inside the country, where he was routinely tortured, being ultimately murdered by two fellow inmates, Constantin Juberian and Ștefan Rek in Gherla prison (according to one testimony, he was beaten to death with sandbags). Juberian was sentenced to death and executed in 1954 for the crime, while Rek was sentenced to 12 years in prison.
