= National Democratic Hungarian-Szekler Party =

The National Democratic Hungarian-Szekler Party (Romanian: Partidul Național-Democrat Maghiar-Secuiesc, PNDMS) was a political party in Romania.

== History ==
The party began as a political group in early 1919 led by Béla Maurer, and started publishing a daily newspaper Új Világ on 27 April.

In the 1919 elections held between 4 and 8 November, the group won eight seats in the Chamber of Deputies, and four in the Senate. The party itself was officially formed on 27 November in a meeting held at the Grand Hotel in Bucharest, with Lajos Dániel becoming party president. However, it did not contest any further elections.

== MPs ==
Term	Chamber of Deputies	Senate
1919–1920	József Fay, Gábor Szabó, Mózes Pethő, András Fekete, Endre Morvay, Béla Maurer, Béla Lengyel, Károly Nesselrode	Lajos Keresztszegy, Lajos Dániel, Győző Truppel, Iván Herepey

== Electoral history ==
=== Legislative elections ===
Election	Votes	%	Assembly	Senate	Position
1919			8 / 568	4 / 216	9th
