= Socialist Party of Transylvania =

Socialist Party of Transylvania Partidul Socialist din Transilvania
- Abbreviation: PST
- Founded: 1919
- Dissolved: 1927
- Split from: MSZDP
- Merged into: PCdR (faction)
- Succeeded by: PSDR
- Ideology: Democratic socialism Romanian minority politics Factions: Social democracy Socialism; Communism

The Socialist Party of Transylvania was a political party in Romania, active primarily in Transylvania. Born out of the ethnic Romanian section of the Social Democratic Party of Hungary (MSZDP), it gradually attracted other socialist and social-democratic groups active in the Transleithanian lands of Austro-Hungary incorporated into the Kingdom of Romania after World War I. Although initially it claimed, under the title Social Democratic Party of Transylvania and Banat, the adherence of the MSZDP party sections in Banat, the latter, while maintaining close links with the Transylvania party, constituted themselves as a distinct political organization. The party also actively sought the cooperation of the socialist parties active in other regions of Romania, working towards a unified political party of the working class. Such plans were however soon thwarted by repression from the part of the Romanian authorities, as well as disagreements both inside the party and among the different socialist formations of Romania. The disagreements were further aggravated by the request of the Third International that the leaders of the party that had collaborated with the Romanian National Party be excluded from the merger, and eventually resulted in the split between the reformist social-democrats and the revolutionary-minded communists. While the former decided to retire from unification talks and re-establish an independent Transyvanian party, the latter joined the majority of Socialist Party of Romania (PSR) to create the Communist Party of Romania in May 1921. The social-democratic faction would late join the PSR members that disagreed with the new orientation of their party, founding the Romanian Social Democratic Party in 1927.

== Attempts at unifying the socialist movement in Romania ==
In the wake of World War I, as Transylvania united with Romania, the greater part of the ethnic Romanian branch of the Social Democratic Party of Hungary, held a Congress in Sibiu on January 19–20, 1919, which decided on the creation of an independent party. In May 1919 the party, along with the socialists active in the pre-war territories of Romania (the Old Kingdom) and Bukovina, adopted a common electoral programme. On September 6, 1919, a party conference in Sibiu unanimously decided to change the name of the party to Socialist Party of Transylvania and Banat, as a step towards the unification with the Socialist Party in the Old Kingdom. Such moves were reciprocated by the latter, which, during its October 1919 Extraordinary Congress held in Iași, decided to include four representatives from Transylvania and Banat in its Executive Committee. Furthermore, the same conference created a General Council in order to coordinate the actions of the socialist parties and groups across all the territories of post-war Romania, and entrusted it with organising a Congress for unifying the socialist movement. The council included representatives from all existing socialist parties, with the eight Transylvanian delegates being elected during a conference held in Sibiu in December. During the same month, the Banat Social Democratic Party formally merged into the Socialist Party of Transylvania and Banat, retaining nevertheless much of its organisational autonomy.

The first meeting of the General Council of the socialist parties and trade unions was held in 1920, between January 31 and February 2, and reunited 47 delegates, including 8 from Transylvania, and 2 from Bukovina. Besides tactics and means of unification, one of the major subjects of the discussion was the international affiliation of the unified party: either with a resurrected Second International or with the more radical Third International (Comintern). The Bucharest socialist section, increasingly communist in outlook, had already requested affiliation to the later in June 1919, however the other sections had yet to come to a decision. During the following months the communist ideas gained traction, and, after the Bucharest section adopted a motion that supported affiliation to the Third, many local section followed suit, mostly in Old Romania, but also in Transylvania and Banat (e.g. the Reșița-Petroșeni section). Ultimately, a new meeting of the General Council, held in April 1920, decided to officially announce it no longer considered the socialist movement in Romania to be bound to the Second International. As a sign of unity, in the context of the May general elections, the council also resolved for some Transylvanian candidates to run in constituencies inside Old Romania, with some representatives from the latter running instead in Transylvania. Consequently, 21 socialists were elected in the Chamber of Deputies and 3 in the Senate. The Congress tasked with the unification of the movement, initially set for April, was postponed twice, as the dispute regarding international dragged on. In the meantime, a regional Congress of the Socialist Party of Transylvania and Banat was held in Cluj during August 15–17, reaffirmed its support for an unified party and relinquished its independence, declaring it would abide by the programme and statute to be decided by the country-wide socialist Congress. A similar resolution was adopted by the Congress of the socialist movement of Banat, held in Timișoara during September 19–20.

In reaction to the numerous labour conflicts across Romania during the summer of 1920, the government adopted in September a new labour law, which severely curtailed the power of the trade unions. At the same time, the heavy-handed response of the authorities to the strikes (which included deployment of army units, militarisation of factories, official censorship. and even armed confrontation) left the working class increasingly disgruntled. The problem of formal unification of the socialist parties and trade unions was thus further postponed, in order to concentrate on the new issue. The October 10–11 meeting of the General Council decided to send a delegation to the government in order to demand recognition of workers' rights, cessation of government intervention in the internal matters of the trade unions, and suspension of the new labour legislation until further negotiations. As the government refused any discussion, the Council called for a general strike, which began on October 20, and engulfed enterprises across Romania. The government cracked down on the workers' movement, closed or devastated the local headquarters of the socialist organizations, and arrested many party and trade union leaders. A provisional committee of the socialist parties, gathering the leaders still at large, decided to suspend the strike on October 28, however some of the workers continued their protest until the first days of November.

In the meantime, a delegation of Romanian socialist, which included two representatives from Transylvania and Banat (Eugen Rozvan and Ioan Flueraș), arrived in Soviet Russia in early October, in order to examine the political and social evolutions following the October Revolution and to discuss the terms of the affiliation to the Third International. After meeting with veteran Romanian socialist Christian Rakovski in Harkov, the delegation left for Moscow, where it discussed with Zinoviev and Bukharin some of the Romanian reservations towards the Twenty-one Conditions. On Soviet request, Flueraş was excluded from the delegation, due to his previous collaboration with the Romanian National Party and participation at the Paris Peace Conference. Six conditions were further imposed on the socialist delegation, among others making affiliation to the Third International conditional upon the exclusion from the party of Flueraș, Iosif Jumanca and other Transylvanian social-democrats which had been part of the Central Romanian National Council.

== Split ==
After the Romanian socialist delegation returned from Soviet Russia, a new meeting of the General Council took place between January 30 and February 3, 1921. While the communists requested the rapid convocation of a Congress and affiliation to the Comintern, Flueraş requested the exclusion of all communist delegates from the central committees. A third faction, the "unitary socialists", sought to maintain the unity of the movement, requested new discussions on the issue of the affiliation, and equal representation of each faction in a provisional executive committee. The communist motion received most votes (18, as opposed to 8 for the social-democrats and 12 for the unitary socialists), and a further attempt to reconcile the faction coming from the unitary socialists was rejected by the others. The eight social-democratic representatives, which included delegates from all the regional parties, declared themselves outside of the party, and constituted a Provisional Committee of the Romanian Social-Democracy, while the communists and unitary socialist continued in the General Council, preparing for the long overdue national Congress.

=== Social-democratic faction ===
The Transylvanian sections that remained under the control of the social-democratic leaders dismissed the decisions of the August 1920 Congress and reorganised the Socialist Party of Transylvania, while similar steps were taken by the sections in Banat, which re-constituted the Socialist Party of Banat. Each party sent one delegate to the founding conference of the International Working Union of Socialist Parties (the 'Two-and-half International') in Vienna in February 1921. Furthermore, ten of the socialist deputies and all the three senators in the Romanian Parliament constituted a distinct parliamentary group in March. During a Congress in Ploiești on June 19–21, 1921, the two parties, along with the Social Democratic Party of Bukovina and a reconstituted Social Democratic Party in parts of Old Romania, formed the Federation of Romanian Socialist Parties, adopting a common reformist programme and affiliating to the Two-and-half International. The Federation was joined during the Bucharest Conference of 27–28 August by the reorganised Socialist Party of Romania, constituted from most of the unitary socialists in Old Romania that did not agree to the unconditional affiliation to the Third International of the original party.

In early 1922, the Transylvanian party had an estimated 2,000 members. In 1927 the Federation of Socialist Parties and its constituent parties merged into a new Social Democratic Party.

=== Communist faction ===
In Transylvania and Banat, several sections - including the ones in Cluj, Arad, Brașov, Oradea, Târgu Mureș, and Timișoara - continued to support the General Council, condemned the decision of the social-democratic faction (which included an important part of the Transylvanian delegates in the council), and, on February 12, constituted the Provisional Transylvanian Council of the Romanian Socialist Party in Cluj. The General Council, which had become dominated by communists, reportedly maintained the allegiance of most party members not only in Old Romania (where the movement had traditionally been more to the left), but also in Transylvania and Banat. The last meeting of the Cluj Provisional Committee took place on May 5, when it dissolved itself, relinquishing the power over the Transylvanian sections in favour of the upcoming Congress. As was the case all over the country, most Congress delegations elected by the local sections in Tranyslvania and Banat were dominated by communists. The Congress began in Bucharest on May 8, 1921. One of the main issues was again the affiliation to the Third International. A hot point of the debate was the official letter from the Comintern, considered unfair and overly critical, with many of the speakers contesting some of its accusations. On the evening of May 11, the majority of the delegates however decided for unconditional affiliation to the Communist International (428 mandates, as opposed to 111 mandates supporting the conditional affiliation proposed by the unitary socialists). The following day the Congress adopted the transformation of the party into the Socialist-Communist Party. In the evening of the same day, the police and army intervened in the Congress and arrested all delegates that had supported unconditional affiliation to the Third International, under the accusation of "plot against state security".
