= Transylvanian Carpathians =

The Transylvanian Carpathians may refer to:

- Eastern Transylvanian Carpathians, a designation for the Eastern Romanian Carpathians
- Southern Transylvanian Carpathians, a designation for the Southern Romanian Carpathians
- Western Transylvanian Carpathians, a designation for the Western Romanian Carpathians

== See also ==
- Romanian Carpathians
- Carpathian Mountains
- Carpathian (disambiguation)
- Transylvania (disambiguation)
- Transylvanian (disambiguation)
