= Arbeiter-Zeitung (Timișoara) =

German language newspaper (1893-1933)

- Editor-in-chief: Josef Gabriel (from 1913)
- Founded: 1893
- Ceased publication: 1933
- Political alignment: Social Democratic Party of Hungary (1893–1918); Banat Socialist Party (1919–1927); Social Democratic Party
- Language: German language
- Headquarters: Timișoara

Volkswille (transl. People's Will), later renamed Arbeiter-Zeitung (transl. Workers Newspaper), was a German language newspaper published from Temesvár/Timișoara between 1893 and 1933. Volkswille was the main organ of the German-speaking labour movement in the Banat region (which belonged to Austria-Hungary until World War I, then incorporated into Romania). It was the sole long-lasting German-language socialist newspaper in the region.

== Hungarian period ==
The first issue of Volkswille appeared on May 1, 1893. Volkswille was founded as a weekly publication. Initially it carried the by-line 'Organ for the Interests of the Working Population in Southern Hungary'. From January 19, 1984, the by-line was changed to 'Organ of the Social Democratic Party of Hungary'. On April 1, 1898, the original by-line was reinstated. On November 8, 1905, the new by-line was 'Social Democratic Organ for Politics and People's Economics of Southern Hungary'. On the same day the newspaper was converted into a twice-weekly publication.

The by-line was somewhat modified on March 28, 1905, as 'Social Democratic Organ for People's Economics of Southern Hungary', and on January 1, 1909, reduced to simply 'Social Democratic Organ of Southern Hungary'.

In the midst of the World War, Volkwille returned to weekly publishing on August 8, 1914.

Editors of Volkswille during the Hungarian period included Wilhelm Paul, Robert Blum (from March 24, 1899), Johann Dobrillovich (from April 6, 1900), Anton Zabilsky (from March 1, 1901), Josef Schwarz (from January 9, 1903), Peter Karl (from May 22, 1903), Gyula Horacsek (from April 29, 1904), János Biró (from May 20, 1904), Béla Czeizel (from November 8, 1905), János Tóth (from November 10, 1906), Rudolf Kruppa (from April 11, 1908), János Maul (from May 16, 1908), Gyula Freund (from June 17, 1908), J. Maul (from October 10, 1908), Ferenc Nedl (from January 6, 1909), J. Schönberger (from June 5, 1909), Lajos Fried (from June 23, 1909), Mihály Back (from November 24, 1909), József Herber (from January 5, 1910), Vilmos Sehorsch (from July 16, 1910), György Bauer (from March 4, 1911), Ferenc Geistlinger (froom March 19, 1911) and József (Josef) Gabriel from January 11, 1913.

== Romanian period ==
On December 1, 1918 Volkswille was converted into a daily newspaper. Between November 25, 1919, and December 11, 1930, it appeared under the name Arbeiter-Zeitung. Josef Gabriel remained the editor of Arbeiter-Zeitung during this period.

The offices of Arbeiter-Zeitung were located on Strada General Dragalina, 1 (45°44′48.4″N 21°12′34.8″E). Arbeiter-Zeitung served as the German-language organ of the Banat Socialist Party, and later of the Social Democratic Party. Notably, whilst there was another German Social Democratic daily in Bukovina (Vorwärts), there was no Romanian-language dailies published in the country as of the late 1920s. In 1930 the name was changed back to Volkswille. The newspaper was closed down in 1933, due to financial constraints. It was replaced by Neue Zeitung, which was published between July 1933 and 1940.
