= Swabian Group =

German political party based in Romania

The Swabian Group (Romanian: Gruparea Șvabilor, SB) was an ethnic German political party in Romania supporting the minority rights of the Banat Swabians.

== History ==
In the 1919 elections it won six seats in the Chamber of Deputies. However, it did not contest any further elections.

== Electoral history ==
=== Legislative elections ===
Election	Votes	%	Assembly	Senate	Position
1919			6 / 568	0 / 216	12th
