= Vorwärts (Cernăuți) =

- Cover of 1924 issue of Vorwärts
- Type: Twice-monthly, weekly newspaper
- Founded: 1899
- Ceased publication: 1937
- Political alignment: Socialist
- Language: German language
- Headquarters: Czernowitz/Cernăuți
- Country: Austria-Hungary, Romania

Vorwärts ('Forward') was a German-language socialist daily newspaper published from Czernowitz/Cernăuți, Bukovina (in Austria-Hungary, later in Romania; present-day Chernivtsi, Ukraine). The newspaper was founded in 1899 with the name Volkspresse ('People's Press'). During its initial phase, Volkspresse was published twice-monthly. Volkspresse was an organ of the Social Democratic Workers Party of Austria and the trade union movement. The newspaper was largely representative of the Jewish labour movement of the town.

== History ==
In 1905 it was converted into a weekly newspaper. Publishers of the newspaper included Jakob Pistiner, Rudolf Gaidosch and Johann Dumpert.

The newspaper was renamed Vorwärts in 1912. The newspaper carried the by-line 'Organ of the International Social Democratic Provincial Organization of Bukovina'. It continued publication until 1914, hereby there was an interruption for a few years. Publication was resumed in 1918. From June 29, 1918 until December 19, 1934 Vorwärts was published daily. It then returned to weekly publication. Vorwärts played an important role in re-activating the workers movement in the town after the war.

Vorwärts focused largely on international issues, leaving little space for local German concerns. The Bundist Dr. Jakob Pistiner served as the editor of the newspaper. Other editors of the newspaper included Albert Silbermann and Salo Hellenberg.

As of the late 1920s, the offices of Vorwärts were located on Strada General Mirescu, 4. Vorwärts was closed down in 1937. The last issue was published on December 19, 1937.

== See also ==
- List of newspapers in Romania
