= 1919 Romanian general election =

- 4–8 November 1919

All 568 seats in the Chamber of Deputies All 216 seats in the Senate
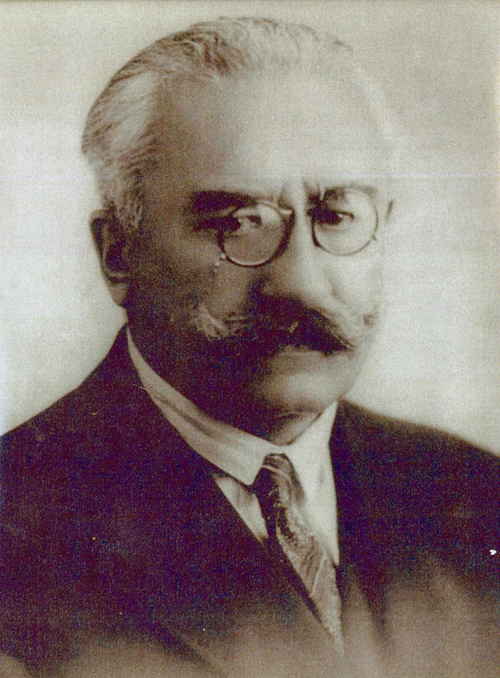

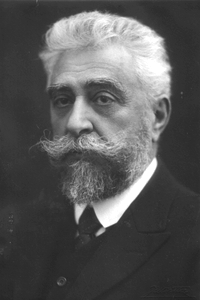

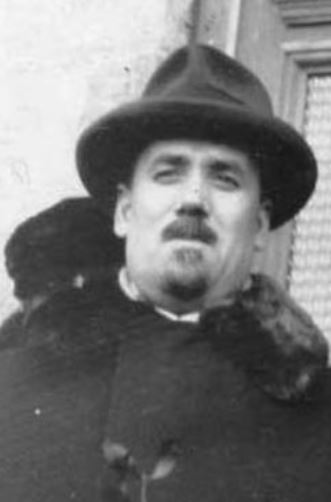
	Majority party	Minority party	Third party
Leader	Alexandru Vaida-Voevod	Ion I. C. Brătianu	Pan Halippa
Party	PNR	PNL	PȚB
Leader's seat	Cluj County	Gorj County	Bălți County
Seats won	169 C / 76 S	103 C / 54 S	72 C / 35 S
Prime Minister before election
Artur Văitoianu
Independent
Subsequent Prime Minister
Alexandru Vaida-Voevod
PNR

General elections were held in Romania between 4 and 8 November 1919. The Romanian National Party, which ran mostly unopposed in Transylvania, emerged as the largest party in Parliament, winning 169 of the 568 seats in the Chamber of Deputies and 76 of the 216 seats in the Senate. Though both the Socialist Party and People's League decided to boycott the elections, several of their candidates who had registered before the decision went on to win seats.

== Results ==
=== Chamber of Deputies ===
Party	Seats
Romanian National Party	169
National Liberal Party	103
Bessarabian Peasants' Party	72
Peasants' Party	61
Democratic Nationalist Party	27
Democratic Union Party	20
Progressive Conservative Party	13
Group of Transylvanian Saxons	8
National Democratic Hungarian-Szekler Party	8
Socialist Party	7
People's League	7
Swabian Group	6
Transylvanian Peasants' Party	4
National Union from Banat	4
Other parties	59
Total	568
Source: Nohlen & Stöver

=== Senate ===
Party	Seats
Romanian National Party	76
National Liberal Party	54
Bessarabian Peasants' Party	35
Peasants' Party	28
Democratic Nationalist Party	9
Democratic Union Party	7
Progressive Conservative Party	4
Group of Transylvanian Saxons	3
Total	216
Source: Nohlen & Stöver
