= Banat Socialist Party =

Banat Socialist Party Partidul Socialist Banat
- Abbreviation: PSB
- Founded: 1919
- Dissolved: 1927
- Merged into: Romanian Social Democratic Party
- Ideology: Social democracy
- Political position: Left-wing
- Colors: Red

The Banat Socialist Party was a political party in the Banat, Romania. The party was founded by social democratic branches in Banat on September 19, 1919, as the Banat Social Democratic Party. In December 1919, the party merged with the Social Democratic Party of Transylvania, but retained its autonomy. The name Banat Socialist Party was adopted at a party conference on May 2, 1920. The party was affiliated to the Federation of Socialist Parties in Romania.

== History ==
The party sent two delegates to the founding conference of the International Working Union of Socialist Parties (the 'Two-and-half International') in Vienna in January 1921. The regional congress of the party was held on January 6-7, 1922 in Timișoara. 35 delegates participated, representing 6,093 party members. The congress ratified the membership in the Federation of Socialist Parties of Romania and unanimously approved of the membership in the 'Two-and-half International'.

In February 1922 the party organized an assembly of party members to elect candidates for the forthcoming parliamentary elections. The candidates selected were Franz Geistlinger for the Lower Chamber and Josef Gabriel for the Senate. The party failed to win any of the two seats. The party complained of terror, intimidation and vote-buying by the Liberals on the polling day.

The Hungarian-language organ of the party was Munkáslap and its German-language organ was Arbeiter-Zeitung. Between 1925 and 1927 the party had a local German-language organ in Jimbolia, Banater Arbeiter-Presse.

In 1927 the Federation of Socialist Parties and its constituent parties merged into a new Social Democratic Party.
