= Group of Transylvanian Saxons =

The Group of Transylvanian Saxons (Romanian: Gruparea Sașilor Transilvăneni, GST) was a political party active in interwar Romania representing the minority rights of the Transylvanian Saxons, a sub-group of the ethnic German community in Romania who have been living in Transylvania since the High Middle Ages.

== History ==
In the 1919 elections it won eight seats in the Chamber of Deputies and three in the Senate. However, it did not contest any further elections.

== Electoral history ==
=== Legislative elections ===
Election	Votes	%	Assembly	Senate	Position
1919			8 / 568	3 / 216	8th
