= Transylvanian Peasants' Party =

Political party in Romania

The Transylvanian Peasants' Party (Romanian: Partidul Țărănesc din Transilvania, PȚT) was a political party in Romania.

== History ==
In the 1919 elections it won four seats in the Chamber of Deputies. The 1920 elections saw the party win six seats. However, it did not contest any further national elections.

== Election results ==
=== Parliamentary elections ===
Election	Votes	%	Assembly	Senate	Position
1919			4 / 568	0 / 216	13th
1920			6 / 366	0 / 166	10th
