= Iosif Jumanca =

Romanian politician (1893–1950)

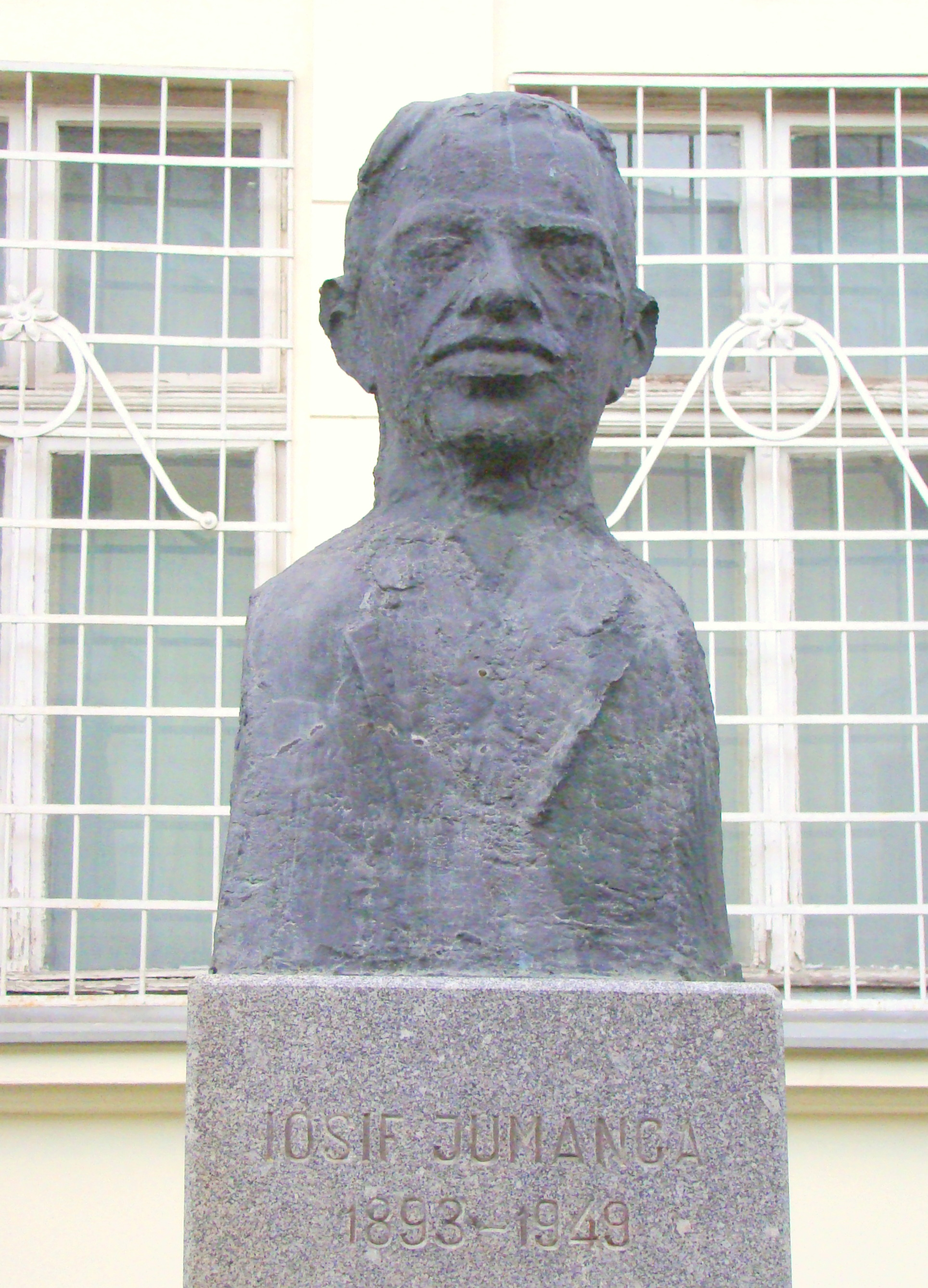
Bust of Jumanca in Alba Iulia

Iosif Jumanca (23 December 1893 – 26 June 1950) was an Austro-Hungarian and Romanian politician.

Born in Fólya, Temes County (now Folea, Timiș County) in 1893, he became a founding member of the Romanian branch of the Hungarian Social Democratic Party, which later became the Social Democratic Party of Transylvania and Banat. A journalist by profession, his political outlook encompassed both a strong patriotism on behalf of Austria-Hungary's Romanians and a commitment to social democracy. He was elected to the party leadership at three successive congresses: Nagyszeben (Sibiu) (December 1906), Budapest (December 1910) and Arad (October 1913). Although he viewed the socialist movement mainly in terms of struggle between classes rather than nationalities, Jumanca insisted on separate Romanian structures because he believed the many Romanian workers of Transylvania and Hungary were hesitant to join Hungarian-led political and trade movements for fear of Magyarization. He saw Romanian-led party sections and unions as a way to educate workers about their own language and history while safeguarding against Magyarization.

Near the end of World War I, on October 30, 1918, a Romanian council was created in Budapest with the goal of preparing the Union of Transylvania with Romania. This body had six representatives from the Romanian National Party and six social democrats, among whom was Jumanca. Moreover, he was present at the assembly in Alba Iulia that proclaimed the union, delivering a speech to the crowd of over 100,000 in which he emphasized the devotion to the national cause of the workers' movement. The following day, he was elected to the region's provisional parliament and named by the interim government as minister for industry.

The subsequent period witnessed negotiations for uniting the socialist movement in Romania's new provinces with that of the Old Kingdom, a process that culminated with a congress held in October 1920 that absorbed the socialists of Transylvania, Banat, and Bukovina into the Socialist Party of Romania. Eight individuals from these provinces were included in the party's leadership, Jumanca among them. Meanwhile, Ioan Flueraș traveled to Moscow to make contact with the Comintern; his experience there led social democrats to reject any ties with Soviet Russia. Thus, in February 1921, the social democrats of Transylvania, Banat, and Bukovina withdrew from the pro-Moscow executive of the Socialist Party and formed a provisional leadership, to which Jumanca was elected.

In May 1921, the socialist movement underwent a split at the founding conference of the Romanian Communist Party. The following month, a Federation of Romanian Socialist Parties was created by, among others, Jumanca, Flueraș, Gheorghe Grigorovici, Ilie Moscovici, and Constantin-Titel Petrescu; this was consolidated at a congress in August 1922. In May 1927, the Federation reorganized into the Romanian Social Democratic Party (PSDR), with Jumanca elected to its leadership. He continued to be elected to executive positions within the party at three subsequent congresses, in 1930, 1933, and 1936.

Jumanca was among the social democrats elected to the Romanian Chamber of Deputies in 1928 and in 1931. Additionally, from 1932 to 1933, he was a member of the Cluj city council. In 1933, he was elected to the Senate, and he served until 1937. Although elected senator for Cluj County on November 29, it was not until the following February 1 that he was sworn in: the assassination of Ion G. Duca by the Iron Guard on December 29 seriously shook the political system. In the event, from the time he was seated until his term expired in November 1937, he was the only social democrat in the Romanian Parliament.

In 1938, with the onset of the National Renaissance Front royal dictatorship of King Carol II, Jumanca was among those social democratic leaders who decided to work within the new system, hoping to improve the situation of the workers while aware of internal threats (the rise of the far-right) and external ones (irredentist demands that threatened to break up the country). Working within the country's social insurance department, neither he nor other social democrats practiced politics, but instead focused on helping the workers' guilds achieve their demands.

On April 12, 1944, he had a meeting with Iuliu Maniu (the leader of the National Peasants' Party) and other socialists, where they discussed a possible program of collaboration. Unlike Grigorovici, Jumanca had not held a position in Carol's government; neither had he been in the king's parliament, as had Flueraș; nor had he even considered cooperating with the Ion Antonescu dictatorship at its onset. These considerations led the individuals who recreated the PSDR after the royal coup d'état of August 23, 1944, to elect Jumanca to the party leadership. In contrast, Grigorovici, Flueraș, Lazăr Măglașu, and Ilie Mirescu were excluded for their past collaboration.

Jumanca was a close ally of Titel Petrescu, whom he followed into the Independent Social Democratic Party after a split between pro- and anti-communist social democrats in March 1946. Along with other party leaders, the two were arrested in February 1948 by the authorities of the new Communist Romania. According to witnesses mentioned by historian Stelian Neagoe, Jumanca was killed by torture at Gherla Prison, his body then transported to Văcărești Prison in Bucharest, in order to hide the evidence of the crime.
