= Transylvania (disambiguation) =

Transylvania is a historical region in present-day Romania.

Transylvania may also refer to:

== Places ==
- Principality of Transylvania (1570–1711), realm of the Hungarian Crown, a semi-independent state, vassal of the Ottoman Empire
- Principality of Transylvania (1711–1867), realm of the Hungarian Crown ruled by Habsburg Imperial Governors, crownland of the Austrian Empire since 1804
- Transilvania Airport, an airport in Romania
- 1537 Transylvania, an asteroid

=== United States ===
- Transylvania, Louisiana, a small town in the United States
- Transylvania County, North Carolina, United States
- Transylvania (colony), an American colony in present-day Kentucky in the 1770s

== Education ==
- Transilvania University of Brașov, a public university in Brașov, Romania
- Transylvania University, a private university in Lexington, Kentucky, United States

== Entertainment ==
- Transylvania 6-5000 (1963 film), an animated short film starring Bugs Bunny
- Transylvania 6-5000 (1985 film), a comedy/horror movie
- Transylvania (film), the title of a 2006 film directed by Tony Gatlif
- Transylvania (board game), a 1981 game from Mayfair
- Transylvania (series), a computer game series of the 1980s
  - Transylvania (video game), the first title in the series
- "Transylvania" (song), a song by Iron Maiden on their 1980 self-titled album Iron Maiden
- Transylvania (Nox Arcana album)
- Transylvania (Creature with the Atom Brain album)
- "Transylvania", a song by Tyler, the Creator from his album Goblin (2011)
- "Transylvania", a song by Kim Petras from her EP Turn Off the Light, Vol. 1 (2018)
- Transylvania, a fictional galaxy from The Rocky Horror Show (1973)

== See also ==
- Transylvanian (disambiguation)
- Transylvanian Carpathians (disambiguation)
- Baby's Coming Back/Transylvania, a single by English band McFly, taken from their 2006 album Motion in the Ocean
- Transylvania 90210: Songs of Death, Dying, and the Dead, a 2005 album by Wednesday 13 and also the title track from the album
- Transylvania in fiction
- Transylvania Mounds, an archaeological site in Louisiana, USA
- Trans-Sylvania Mountain Bike Epic
- Transylmania
