= 1920 Romanian general election =

- 25–27 May 1920

All 366 seats in the Chamber of Deputies All 166 seats in the Senate
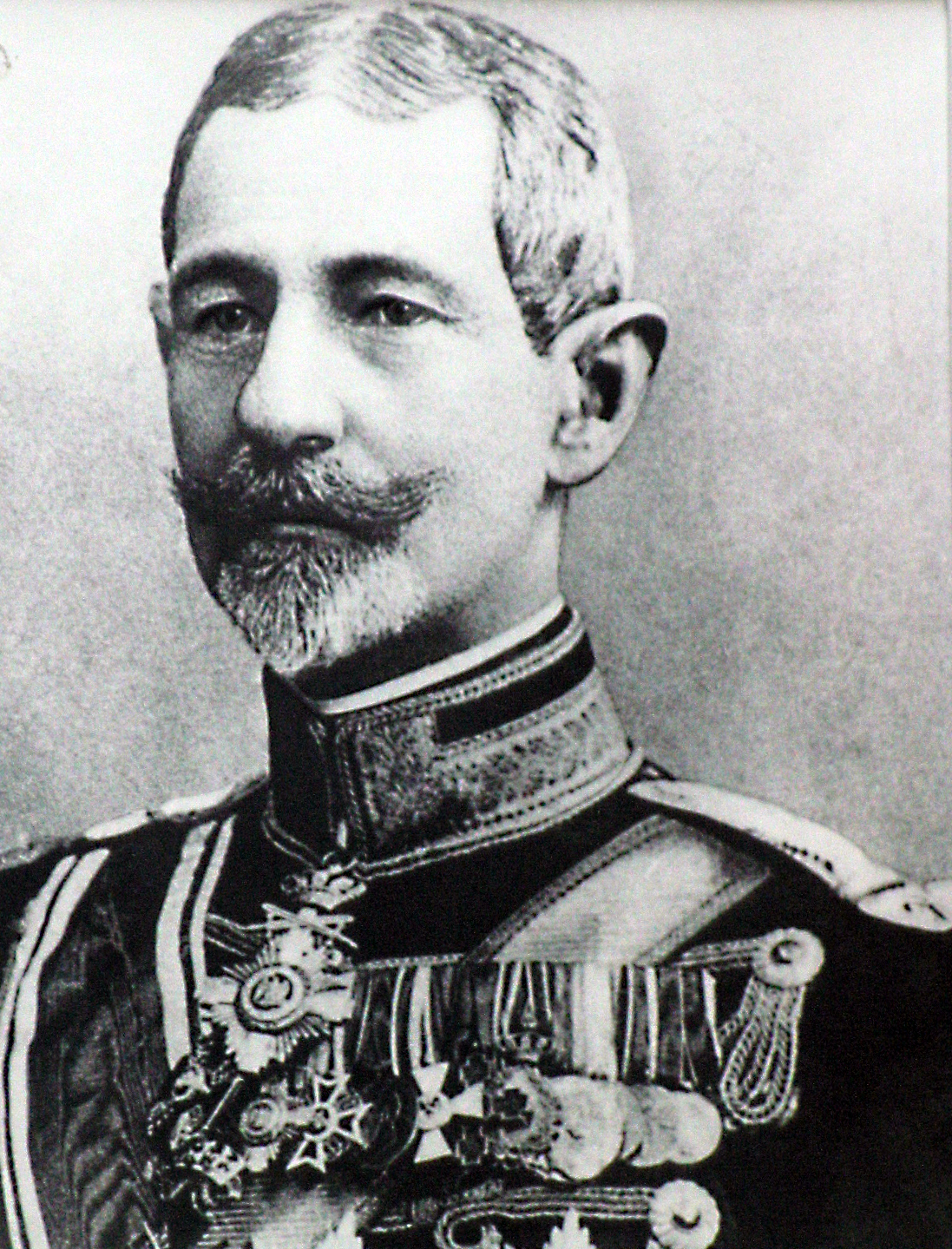

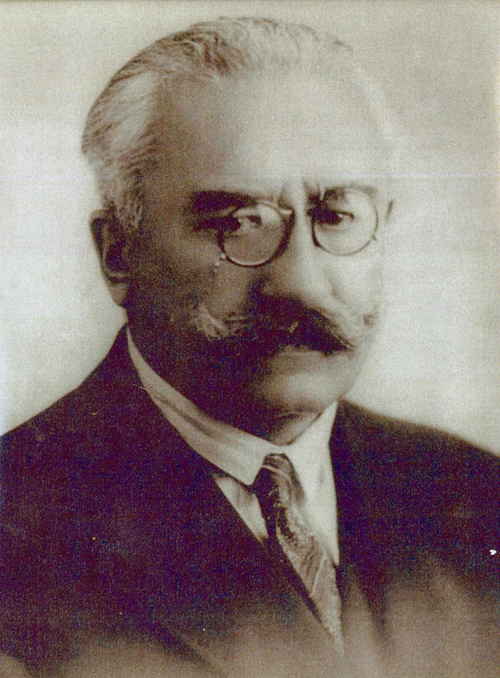
| | Majority party | Minority party |
|---|---|---|
| Leader | Alexandru Averescu | Alexandru Vaida-Voevod |
| Party | PP | PNR |
| Leader's seat | Bucharest | Cluj County |
| Seats won | 206 C / 124 S | 27 C / 14 S |
| Seat change | ▲199 C / ▲124 S | ▼142 C / ▼62 S |
Prime Minister before election
Alexandru Averescu
PP
Subsequent Prime Minister
Alexandru Averescu
PP

General elections were held in Romania between 25 and 27 May 1920. The result was a victory for the governing People's Party, which won 206 of the 366 seats in the Chamber of Deputies and 124 of the 166 seats in the Senate.

== Results ==
=== Chamber of Deputies ===
| Party | Seats | +/– |
|---|---|---|
| People's Party | 206 | +199 |
| Romanian National Party | 27 | –142 |
| National Liberal Party | 16 | –87 |
| Peasants' Party | 25 | –36 |
| Bessarabian Peasants' Party | 23 | –49 |
| Socialist Party | 19 | +12 |
| Conservative-Democratic Party | 17 | New |
| Democratic Nationalist Party–Iorga | 10 | New |
| German Party | 10 | New |
| Transylvanian Peasants' Party | 6 | +2 |
| Democratic Nationalist Party–Cuza | 2 | New |
| Democratic Union Party | 1 | –19 |
| Other parties | 4 | – |
| Total | 366 | –202 |
Source: Nohlen & Stöver

=== Senate ===
| Party | Seats | +/– |
|---|---|---|
| People's Party | 124 | +124 |
| Romanian National Party | 14 | –62 |
| Peasants' Party | 10 | –18 |
| Bessarabian Peasants' Party | 6 | –29 |
| Conservative-Democratic Party | 4 | New |
| Socialist Party | 3 | +3 |
| Democratic Nationalist Party–Iorga | 2 | New |
| German Party | 2 | New |
| National Liberal Party | 1 | –53 |
| Total | 166 | –50 |
Source: Nohlen & Stöver
