= Iacob Pistiner =

Romanian politician and lawyer

Election campaign poster for Pistiner, in Romanian and Yiddish

Iacob Pistiner (German: Jakob Pistiner; 1882 – 24 August 1930) was a Romanian politician and lawyer.

He was born in Chernivtsi, Bukovina, 1882, then part of Austro-Hungarian Empire, in a Jewish family. As a result of the general election of May–June, 1920, in Greater Romania, he was elected member of the parliament, defeating the German candidate by a majority of only 30 votes.

His political career was tied with the socialist movement. In 1917, he joined Mayer Ebner in establishing the Jewish National Council in Chernivtsi. As a lawyer he pleaded for the defendants in the "Trial of the 500" that followed the important 1924 Tatarbunary Uprising.

He died unexpectedly in 1930 in Bucharest, aged 49.
