= 1920 Romanian general strike =

Nationwide strike in Romania in 1920

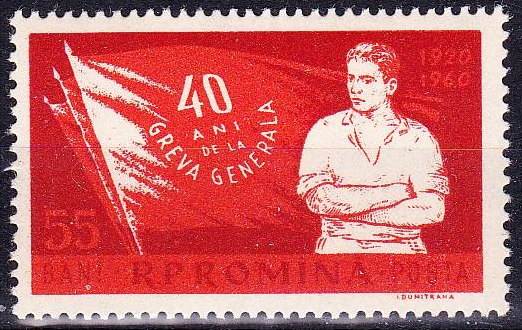
1960 postage stamp commemorating the strike, issued by the Romanian People's Republic.

The 1920 Romanian general strike was a major nationwide strike in the Kingdom of Romania which lasted from 20 to 28 October and involved the participation of most of the over 400,000 industrial workers from across the country. The demands of the workers included the recognition of the workers' factory committees, demilitarization of the industrial enterprises, abolition of the state of siege, elimination of censorship and the adoption of a new legislation regarding labour disputes. During the strike, hundreds of people were arrested, the publication of the newspaper Socialismul was suspended, and the Averescu government proclaimed a state of siege. The strike was violently repressed by the government using the Romanian Army and the leaders of the workers were sentenced to prison.
