= Elena Bacaloglu =

Romanian journalist, literary critic, novelist and fascist militant (1878 - 1949)

Elena (Hélène) Bacaloglu
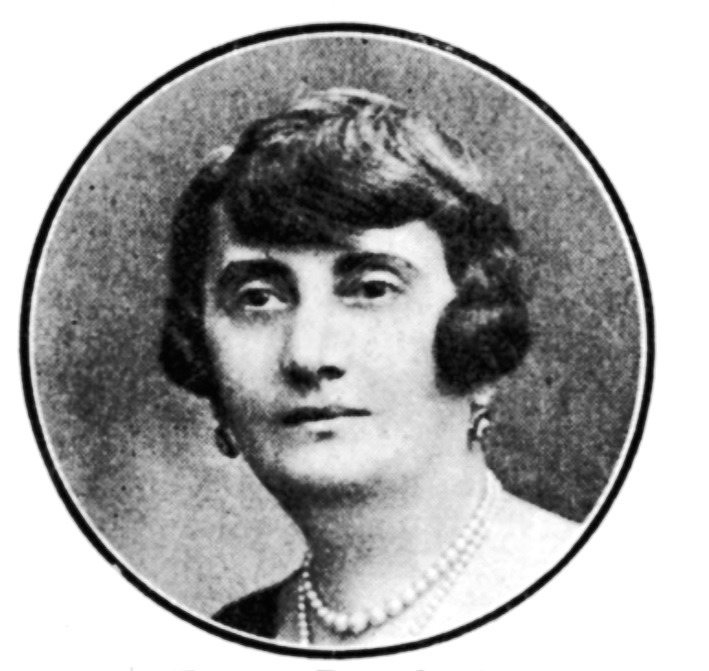
- Bacaloglu in 1933
- Born: December 19, 1878; Bucharest
- Died: 1947 or 1949 (aged 69–71); Bucharest
- Occupations: Journalist, critic, political militant
- Writing career
- Period: 1903–1923
- Genres: Essay, psychological novel
- Literary movement: Impressionism

Elena A. Bacaloglu, also known as Bakaloglu, Bacaloglu-Densusianu, Bacaloglu-Densușeanu etc. (Francized Hélène Bacaloglu; December 19, 1878 – 1947 or 1949), was a Romanian journalist, literary critic, novelist and fascist militant. Her career in letters produced an introduction to the work of Maurice Maeterlinck (1903), several other critical essays, and two novels. She married and divorced writer Radu D. Rosetti, then Ovid Densusianu, the Symbolist poet and literary theorist.

Bacaloglu lived most of her later life in the Kingdom of Italy, where she affiliated with the literary and political circles. Her subsequent work included campaigns for Pan-Latinism and Romanian irredentism. This second career peaked upon the close of World War I, when Bacaloglu became involved with Italian fascism. Introduced to Benito Mussolini and Benedetto Croce, she helped transplant fascism on Romanian soil. Her National Italo-Romanian Cultural and Economic Movement was a minor and heterodox political party, but managed to earn attention with its advocacy of political violence.

This classical Romanian fascist movement merged into the more powerful National Romanian Fascio, then reconstructed itself under Bacalogu's own leadership. It survived the troubles of 1923, but was disbanded by government order in 1925, and was entirely eclipsed by the Iron Guard. Shunned by Mussolini, Bacaloglu lived her final decades in relative obscurity, enmeshed in political intrigues. Her fascist ideas were taken up by some in her family, including her brother Sandi and her son Ovid O. Densusianu.

== Biography ==
=== Early life and literary debut ===
The Bacaloglus, whose name is the Turkish for "grocer's son" (var. Bakkaloğlu), were a family of social and political importance, descending from the Bulgaro-Romanian Ion D. H. Bacaloglu, a recipient of the Order of Saint Stanislaus. Elena's ancestors were first mentioned in Bucharest about 1826, having settled in Wallachia as foreign nationals, and set up business as land speculators. Elena's father was Bucharest civil administrator Alexandru Bacaloglu (1845–1915), related to scientist Emanoil Bacaloglu. He was married to Sofia G. Izvoreanu (1854–1942). Alexandru and Sofia's children, other than Elena, were: Constantin (1871–1942), a University of Iași physician; Victor (1872–1945), an engineer, writer and journalist; and George (Gheorghe) Bacaloglu, an artillery officer and literary man. Another brother, lawyer Alexandru "Sandi" Bacaloglu, was less known until a 1923 incident propelled him into the public arena.

Elena was born in Bucharest on December 19, 1878. Compared to other Romanian women of the fin de siècle, and even to some men, she was highly educated, taking her diplomas at the University of Bucharest Faculty of Letters and the Collège de France. Her study interests were French culture, art history, and philosophy. It was in Paris (where she was chaperoned by Constantin Bacaloglu) that she met Ovid Densusianu, her future lover. However, her first marriage was to Radu D. Rosetti, who was to become a highly successful lawyer and a minor neoromantic poet. Reportedly, she fell "madly in love", and convinced her reluctant parents to approve of him. They were engaged on December 19, 1896, and had their religious wedding in January of the next year, with politician Nicolae Filipescu as godfather. They had a daughter together.

The marriage did not last: by 1897, unable to make ends meet, Rosetti deserted his wife and daughter, who moved back into Alexandru Bacaloglu's home. In June 1898, she attempted suicide by shooting herself in the chest, and was saved by an emergency intervention on her right lung. The Rosetti–Bacaloglu divorce was registered in 1899. On August 7, 1902, Elena married Ovid Densusianu, who was fast becoming the theoretician of Romanian Symbolism. Historian Lucian Nastasă describes theirs as an odd union. Elena was "extremely beautiful"; Ovid, much less educated than his wife, was also "short and limp". They had a son, Ovid Jr (or Ovid O. Densusianu), born in March or April 1904.

Bacaloglu's editorial debut was in 1903, when Editura Socec published her monograph Despre simbolizm și Maeterlinck ("On Symbolism and Maeterlinck"). Together with the essays of Alexandru Bibescu (1893) and Izabela Sadoveanu-Evan (1908), it constitutes an early Romanian attempt to define the limits of Symbolism, Decadence and modernity. In Bacaloglu's interpretation, Symbolism and Decadentism were the two sides of a coin: while the Decadents gave voice to the late-19th-century "degeneration" of the Latin race, the Symbolists epitomized the Latin "revival", a triumph of mysteries and metaphysics. Straddling these two eras were Maeterlinck's Hothouses, which she was the first to discuss from a Romanian perspective. According to literary historian Angelo Mitchievici, Despre simbolizm tackles the literary critic's perspective as a "participatory-impressionistic formula, not lacking in refinement".

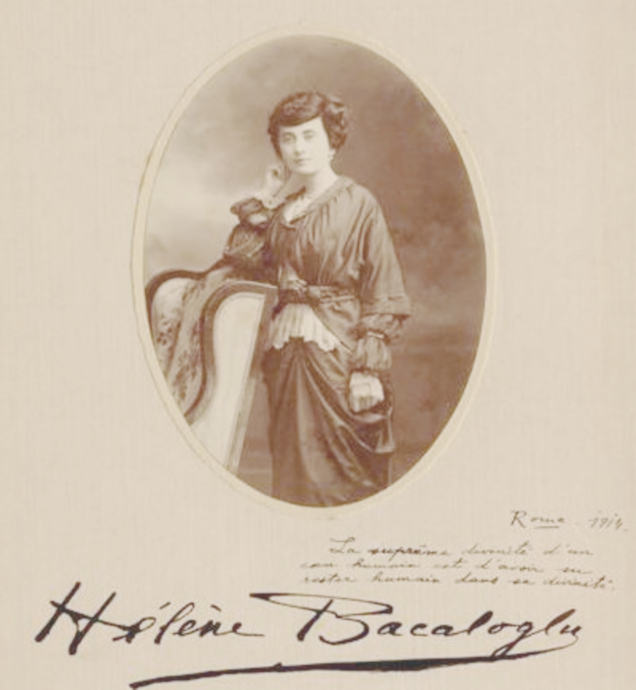
Bacaloglu's studio photograph and autographed dedication, 1914

In 1906, Bacaloglu also published her psychological novel, În luptă ("In Combat"), followed in 1908 by another novelistic work, Două torțe ("Two Torches"). Her writing was poorly reviewed by the literary chronicler at Viața Românească, who argued that În luptă was impossible to read through. The book was presented to the Romanian Academy as a candidate for the annual literary prize, but was rejected with objections regarding Bacaloglu's "tortured" writing technique and her poor grasp of literary Romanian. Other magazines, including Noua Revistă Română and Convorbiri Critice, hosted samples of her literary work.

=== Relocation to Italy ===
Meanwhile, Bacaloglu had separated from Densusianu, divorcing him in 1904. Having traveled through much of Western Europe, she spent most of her time in Italy, writing articles for Il Giornale d'Italia, Madame, and the political magazine L'Idea Nazionale. For a few months in 1908, she had an affair with the poet-playwright Salvatore Di Giacomo, whose Assunta Spina she translated for Convorbiri Critice (August 1909). She later married a third time, to an Italian.

In the early 1910s, Bacaloglu was living in Rome, where, in September 1912, she published a monograph about the love affair between Romanian poet Gheorghe Asachi and his Italian muse, Bianca Milesi. A recipient of the Bene Merenti medal, granted by the Romanian King Carol I, she translated into French the prose work of his consort, Carmen Sylva. She also represented Romania at the Castel Sant'Angelo National Exhibit, and, as "Hélène Bacaloglu", gave French-language conferences about Di Giacomo. During the period, she came into conflict with Romanian antiquarian Alexandru Tzigara-Samurcaș. Mandated by the Romanian government, Tzigara replaced Bacaloglu at the National Exhibit's Romanian Committee. He described Bacaloglu as an illegitimate, self-appointed, representative, and noted that the Italian press also mistrusted her abilities. Bacaloglu presented her own version of the events in a protest to the curators, later published as a brochure.

Her conferences on Di Giacomo were received with more sympathy: Alberto Cappelletti gave them a good review in Il Giorno, and E. Console republished them as a fascicle, but all such collaborations ended abruptly when her collaborators became dissatisfied with her character and the quality of her prose. She still continued to be held in esteem by her Romanian peers and, in 1912, was voted into their Romanian Writers' Society.

Shortly after the outbreak of World War I, Bacaloglu turned to political activism and interventionism, campaigning for still-neutral Romania to join the Entente Powers, and supporting the annexation of Romanian-inhabited Transylvania. To this goal, she published in Bucharest the Italian-language essay Per la Grande Rumania ("For Greater Romania") and the French-language Preuves d'amour. Conférences patriotiques ("Proofs of Love. Patriotic Conferences"). In Bacaloglu's activity, irredentism blended with the cause of Pan-Latinism. She joined the Pan-Latin association Latina Gens, which welcomed in members of all "Latin" nations and looked forward to a "Latin federation" of states. Working for this organization, she became close to Italian General Luigi Cadorna, described by Romanian officials as her "protector", and Foreign Minister Sidney Sonnino.

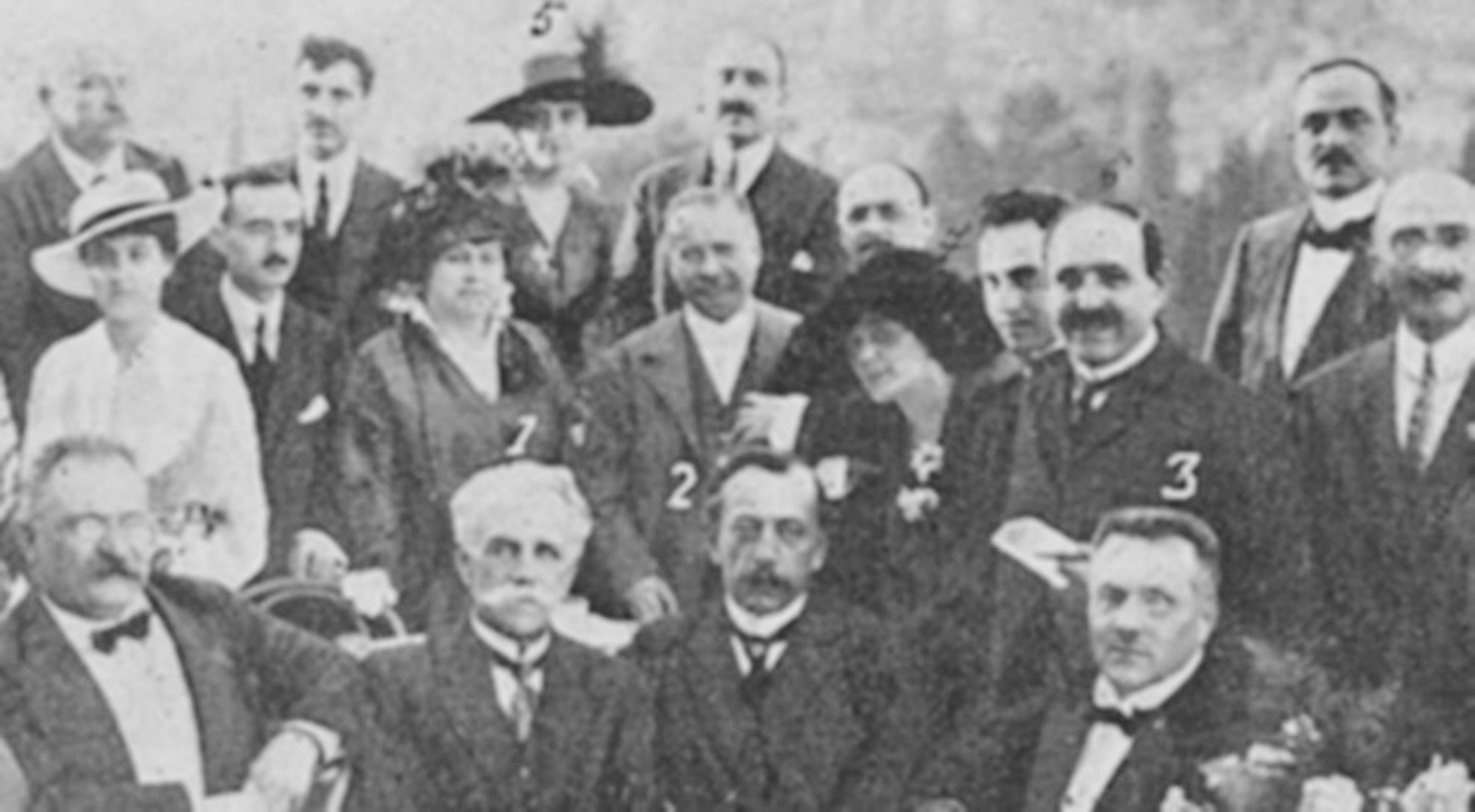
Bacaloglu (back row, marked 5) and the Latina Gens, gathered around Sebastião de Magalhães Lima (1) and Jules Destrée (2), in July 1916

Her efforts to popularize the Romanian cause among the troops fighting on the northern Italian front were interrupted in October 1917 by the Battle of Caporetto, which Italy lost, forcing Bacaloglu to take refuge in Genoa. She subsequently played a part in creating the "Romanian Legion in Italy". Grouping Romanians from Transylvania and Italian sympathizers, this military formation fought the Central Powers in Italy. However, Bacalogu and Latina Gens were not invited at the Legion's founding ceremony, held at Cittaducale in June 1918.

According to Victor Babeș, the Transylvanian doctor and publicist, Elena Bacaloglu was "the great propagandist of Romanianism abroad, and especially so in Italy". The cause of "Greater Romania" fascinated two of Bacaloglu's three brothers: Victor, the author of patriotic plays, created one of the first all-Romanian newspapers in Bessarabia; George fought with distinction during the war of 1916, fulfilled several diplomatic missions, and was later a Prefect of Bihor County, Transylvania. Elena, Constantin and Victor were all correspondents for George Bacaloglu's cultural review, Cele Trei Crișuri, well into the 1930s.

=== Fascist experiment ===
After the war, Elena Bacaloglu remained in Italy as a correspondent of Universul, the Bucharest daily. One of the first Romanians to gain familiarity with the modern far-right movements in Europe, and, historians assess, driven by an "enormous ambition", she contemplated transplanting Italian fascism into Greater Romania. This project had preoccupied her since the "red biennium" of 1919–1920, when she presented a proto-fascist appeal to the Italian nationalist Gabriele d'Annunzio and wrote articles for Il Popolo d'Italia. Benito Mussolini, who presided over the Fasci Italiani paramilitaries, also received Bacologlu's letters, but was noticeably skeptical at first. She also addressed Italian journalists Giuseppe Bottai and Piero Bolzon, who agreed to become members of Bacaloglu's Romanian fascist steering committee. At the time, Bacaloglu was also a friend of philosopher and fascist admirer Benedetto Croce, and corresponded with him on a regular basis.

Just as she was embarking on this ideological mission, Bacaloglu was drawn into a conflict with the Romanian political establishment. In the Italian Chamber of Deputies, Mussolini's National Fascist Party took up her cause: in August 1920, deputy Luigi Federzoni accused the Romanian state of trying to kidnap and silence Bacaloglu, "a person of the highest respectability". In 1922, the tribunal of Casale Monferrato heard her complaint against Romania over copyright issues. Bacaloglu again complained that Romanian Siguranța agents tried to kidnap her during the Genoa Conference. The same year, fascist deputy Alessandro Dudan took Bacaloglu's side in her conflict with Romanian authorities, noting that the latter were abusing their powers. Bacaloglu and her claims were shunned by successive Romanian Ambassadors, who simply noted that she suffered from a "mania for persecution".

Mussolini himself acknowledged Bacaloglu's admiration. He corresponded with Bacaloglu, sending her point-by-point instructions about "Latin expansionism" and about economic cooperation against capitalism. These were made public by Bacaloglu in her brochure Movimento nazionale fascista italo-romeno. Creazione e governo ("National Italo-Romanian Fascist Movement. Creation and Steering"), published in Milan after Mussolini's victorious "March on Rome". Seeking to "draw the fascist chief [Mussolini] closer to Romania's political course", Bacaloglu also made visible efforts to prevent a rapprochement between Italy and Romania's rival, Regency Hungary. She denounced Romania's foreign policies in articles she wrote for the Italian newspapers, depicting liberal politicians as lackeys of the French Republic.

At some point in 1921, with Mussolini's acquiescence, Bacaloglu established an Italo–Romanian fascist association, later known as National Italo-Romanian Cultural and Economic Movement (MNFIR). Her followers began setting up fascist leagues in Romania—one of the first such clubs was founded in the Transylvanian regional capital, Cluj. The main difference between the Italian and Romanian fascists was their respective stance on the "Jewish Question": the Italo-Romanian Movement was antisemitic; the original Fasci were not. The goal was supported by other Constantin Bacaloglu, in his work at Iași University. Working with the antisemitic opinion leader, A. C. Cuza, he gave endorsement to rioters who called for the expulsion of most Romanian Jewish students, and tolerated fascist symbolism. However, according to political scientist Emanuela Costantini, the antisemitic agenda of the Movement was comparatively "moderate"; she highlights instead Bacaloglu's other ideas: "an anti-industrialism in the populist mold", and a version of nationalism heavily inspired by the Action Française.

The Romanian branch of Italian fascism was always minor, and vied for attention with a plethora of paramilitary groups. As suggested by Costantini, it shared their anticommunism and contempt for democracy, but was the only one to be directly inspired by Mussolini. In 1922, MNFIR split, and its more powerful sections, presided upon by Titus Panaitescu-Vifor, merged with the National Romanian Fascio (FNR). However, in 1923, Bacaloglu reentered central politics as leader of the reconstructed MNFIR, directly modeled on the Fasci Italiani. On December 30 of that year, she founded the propaganda weekly Mișcarea Națională Fascistă, of which she was also the "political director". Only about a hundred people were persuaded to join, even though, as historian Francisco Veiga notes, many represented the more active strata of Romanian society (soldiers, students). Powerful cells gravitated around the University of Cluj (Transylvania) and Constantin Bacaloglu's own Iași University. Women themselves were largely absent: still not granted the vote under the 1923 Constitution, they generally preferred enrollment in specifically feminist organizations, and were never popular with the more significant Romanian fascist parties (including, from 1927, the Iron Guard).

=== Antifascist clampdown and disgrace ===
Throughout its short existence, Bacaloglu's association was very vocal in condemning the Romanian status-quo and the Treaty of Versailles. She believed that the Little Entente, which was partly dedicated to countering Italian irredentism but included Romania, would leave the two countries prey to capitalist and Jewish exploitation. Some reports suggest that the "Romanian fascio" took it upon itself to threaten enemies of the deposed, but politically ambitious, Crown Prince Carol (who did not in fact approve of the Romanian fascists). In October 1923, Nicolae Iorga, a historian who opposed Carol's return, accused the organization of sending him hate mail.

The MNFIR became the object of government repression, soon after the antisemitic student Corneliu Zelea Codreanu was arrested on charges of terrorism. Codreanu had attempted to assassinate the staff of Adevărul, including the Jewish manager Iacob Rosenthal, and, during the interrogations, implicated other fascist alliances. His testimony was disputed by Vestul României, the pro-fascist newspaper of Timișoara, which claimed: "The attempt [...] is not the work of terrorists, as was quickly proclaimed by some of our colleagues, but the mere revenge of one Sandi Bacaloglu who wished to defend the honor of his sister, that had been compromised by one Adevărul article, wherein it had been claimed that Elena Bacaloglu had been convicted for immodesty by the appellate court of Genoa." Several other theories circulate regarding Codreanu's motivation, but it is known that his group of assassins included an FNR man, Teodosie Popescu, and also that the act was celebrated in the FNR media.

The news was taken up in another Transylvanian paper, Clujul, which claimed that "the lawyer Bacaloglu" had "taken revenge on his sister's slanderer". Also according to Clujul, Vifor, who lived in Rome and was not involved in the Rosenthal incident, remained recognized as the "fascist leader"—as FNR president. Meanwhile, George Bacaloglu, interviewed by the press, denied any connection with his sister's movement. According to historian Armin Heinen, the MNFIR was never a fully fledged party, whereas Vifor's more powerful movement could present a more attractive platform to some of Bacaloglu's disillusioned followers. The FNR was explicitly Nazi as well as corporatist, and as such still had little to do with the Mussolinian program. Somewhat larger in numbers, it managed to absorb two other nationalist political clubs, emerging from this fusion with a program supporting dictatorial politics and the expulsion of all foreigners.

Sandi Bacaloglu was soon imprisoned, facing charges of attempted assassination and sedition. The court only cleared him of the more serious charges, and fined him 50 Lei. Accounts differ as to what became of Elena Bacaloglu's fascist party. She is credited as a founder of the successor National Fascist Movement (MNF), closed down by Romanian Police in 1925. However, this mainly Transylvanian party did not have a direct link with the Bacaloglus. Before the police clampdown, the FNR announced in Clujul its goal of destroying "the intrigues of foreigners", and its motto ("The Fascio does not forget!"). It also informed Transylvanians that Sandi Bacaloglu, recently freed and presenting himself as a Mussolini envoy, was not a fascist, and could not claim to represent any local fascist party.

Bacaloglu became a persona non grata and was deported from Italy once Mussolini grew aware of her dissident stance. A Romanian police report of the period suggests that "the Fascist Party of Romania" intended to join up with Cuza and Codreanu's National-Christian Defense League (LANC) and the Romanian Action, into a "National Christian Party". In October 1925, however, Cuza officially announced that the National Romanian Fascio, the Romanian Action, and the Transylvanian Social-Christian Party had voted to dissolve and merge with the League, with the common goal being "the elimination of the kikes". Sandi Bacaloglu signed his name to the appeal as a Fascio representative, and became a member of the LANC's executive council, on par with Ioan Moța, Ion Zelea Codreanu, Iuliu Hațieganu, Valeriu Pop, Iuniu Lecca. Afterward, Sandi Bacaloglu ran in the general election of 1926 on the same list as Cuza and Codreanu.

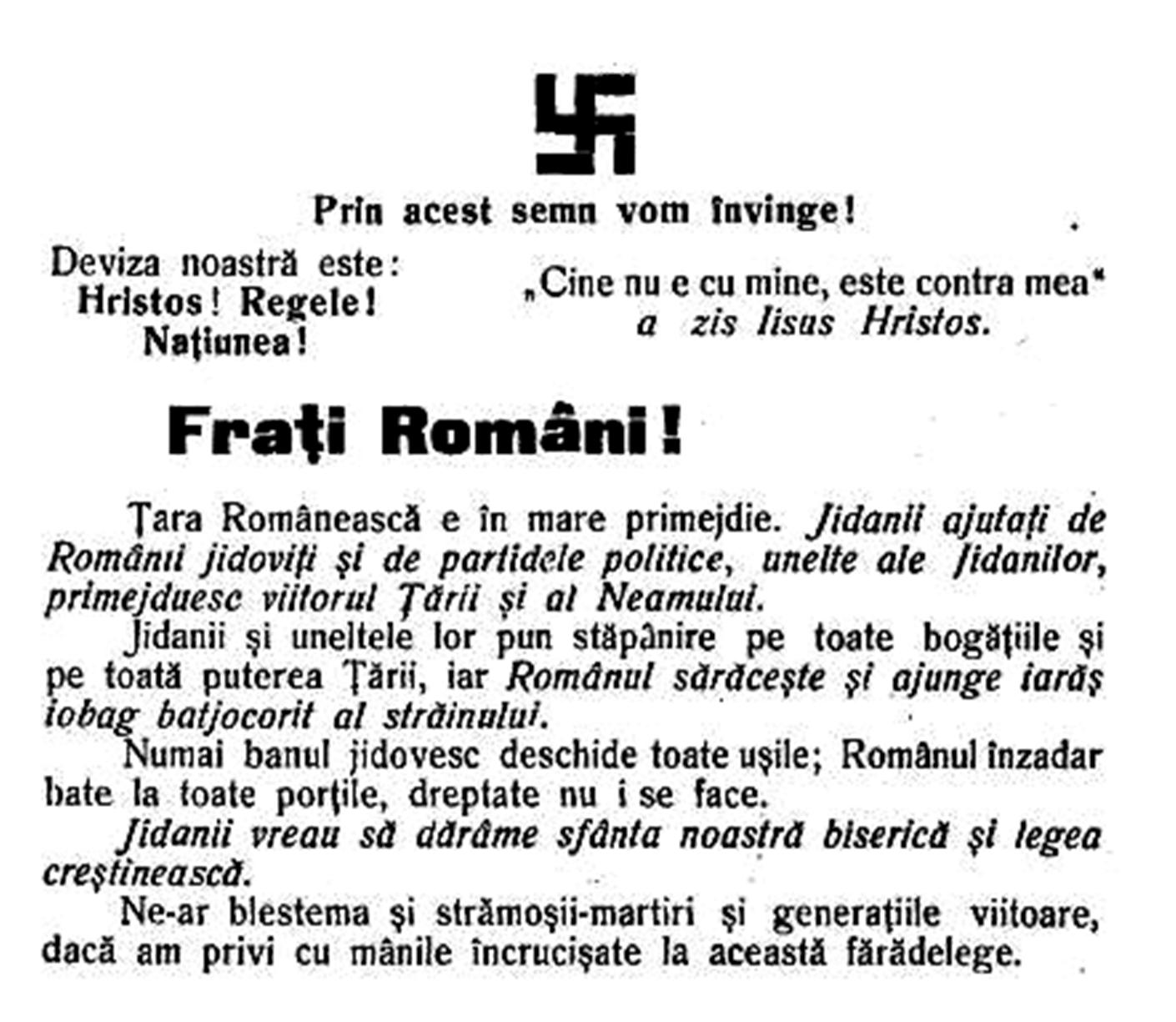
1928 manifesto of the National-Christian Defense League, published under the swastika logo. It proclaims: "Romanian brethren! The Land of the Romanians faces a great peril. The kikes, with assistance from Judaized Romanians and the political parties, as tools of the kikes, are gambling with the future of the Country and Folk."

In 1927, his sister still held claim to being leader of "the national fascist movement", with temporary headquarters in "the Solacoglu House", Moșilor. She also pursued her dispute with the Romanian state. She claimed that the authorities still owed her some 4 million Lei, which she tried to obtain from Interior Affairs Minister Octavian Goga and from Writers' Society president Liviu Rebreanu. In her letters to Rebreanu, she made transparent allusions to the possibility of mutual help but, researcher Andrei Moldovan suggests, was incoherent and needlessly haughty.

=== Later years ===
In 1928, Bacaloglu left Romania on a visit to the Kingdom of Spain, where she continued to campaign for Pan-Latinism and collaborated with La Gaceta Literaria. The latter introduced her as "that Central European feminine type, dedicated to journalism, to embassy work, to zigzagging and daring missions." For his part, Vifor had probably put his activity on hold by January 1929, when he was assigned a diplomatic post in Barcelona. He later returned to Bucharest as a representative of Balcan Oriente news agency. Also in 1929, the Romanian fascio was revived a third and final time, when a certain Colonel August Stoica tried to use it in his coup against government, variously described as an "operatic plot" or a "shambolic conspiracy". The conspirators were rounded up and made subject to a public trial, during which prosecution invoked the Mârzescu Law against fascist as well as communist sedition.

Bacaloglu herself remained active on the margin of Romanian politics, witnessing from the side as Prince Carol retook his throne with the help of Iuliu Maniu and the National Peasants' Party. She approached the Maniu government and the Foreign Ministry with offers of support and complaints about past persecutions, but these were poorly received. She was eventually allowed to return to Italy in support of the Romanian propaganda effort, protected by the National Peasantist undersecretary, Savel Rădulescu (and, allegedly, by the League of Nations' Nicolae Titulescu), but lost endorsement in a subsequent transfer of power. She continued with her appeals to Rebreanu (who was also being asked to help George Bacaloglu revive Cele Trei Crișuri) and writer-bureaucrat Eugen Filotti. In 1931, she claimed that a conspiracy, headed by diplomat Filip Lahovary and the leaders of the National Liberal Party, wanted to assassinate her "through hunger" and prevented her from even talking to people of influence. Bacaloglu also stated that, in exchange for recognition of financial support, she could obtain Mussolini's endorsement for the National Peasantists, who were in the opposition.

Sandi Bacaloglu carried on a LANC activist and then joined the successor National Christian Party (PNC), running in the legislative election of 1937 in Bucharest's Black Sector. As a Bucharest PNC leader, he also led street battles with a more minor LANC splinter group, the Fire Swastika. By then, Elena's son by Densusianu was also entering public life. Educated in Italy and Romania, Ovid Jr trained as a schoolteacher and then became a press officer at the Interior Ministry. He also had prospects of becoming a writer, and is especially remembered for a 1937 novel, Stăpânul ("The Master"). He adhered to his mother and uncle's fascist ideology: he was a staff writer for the Iron Guard paper Porunca Vremii, translated the political essays of Mussolini and Antonio Beltramelli, and campaigned in support of Italy during the Ethiopian War. In May 1936, he helped Mihail Manoilescu establish the local network of Fascist Action Committees (CAUR).

Always a staunch critic of fascism, Ovid Densusianu Sr died unexpectedly on June 8, 1938, after surgery and sepsis. A year into World War II, Elena was again living in Rome, but had to return to Romania because, as she put it, "fake Latin nationalists" wanted her gone. She was issued new papers attesting her move to Bucharest, and was still living there in April 1945. During the same interval, Titus Vifor reactivated his fascism. He was assigned by the Iron Guard's "National Legionary State" to direct the Romanian Propaganda Office in Rome, together with writers Aron Cotruș and Vintilă Horia, and, in May 1941, became its president.

In old age, Bacaloglu witnessed the August 1944 Coup, Soviet occupation, and the transition from fascism to democracy, then to communism. In 1947 she sold the letters she had received from Italian literati to the publicist I. E. Torouțiu, who passed them on to the Romanian Academy Library. She maintained friendly contacts with the left-leaning writer Gala Galaction, but nevertheless lived to see the effects of political retaliation and recession on the Bacaloglu family: her daughter by Rosetti was sacked from her government job.

Bacaloglu died later that year (or, according to some sources, in 1949), and was buried in Bellu cemetery. She was survived by Ovid Jr. After the official establishment of Communist Romania, he focused on his work as a philologist, but was still arrested in 1958, and spent six years as a political prisoner. He died in Bucharest, on April 19, 1985.
