= Titus Panaitescu-Vifor =

Romanian fascist politician

Titus Panaitescu-Vifor (22 July 1893 – ?) was a Romanian fascist politician, journalist, businessman, playwright, and co-founder of the National Romanian Fascio. He served as a commercial attaché of Romania to Belgium (1920-?), and as a cultural attaché and head of the propaganda service of Romania to Italy in the early 1940s.

== Early life and career ==
Titus Panaitescu-Vifor was born on 22 July 1893 in Focșani, to Dimitrie and Hélène (née David). He had one brother, Constantin Panaitescu.

Panaitescu-Vifor studied business in Thessaloniki, Greece, and later earned a doctorate in social sciences. In 1915, he co-founded a literary magazine, Făclia, with F. Hotin, to which writer Tudor Arghezi and painter Leon Biju also contributed. He published a series of plays, including Veneticul (1915) and Stând de vorbă cu moartea (1918). During the First World War, Panaitescu-Vifor served as a captain or lieutenant in Iași, and maintained a close relationship with Arghezi. Following the end of the First World War, Panaitescu-Vifor served as editor-in-chief of the military magazine Ilustrațiunea Armatei, and later as founding editor of the Iași-based newspaper Timpul.

In 1918, Panaitescu-Vifor joined the populist, militarist People's Party, led by Alexandru Averescu, wherein he began to develop anti-communist, antisemitic, militarist, anti-German, and generally xenophobic ideas. Although he was initially expected to run as a People's Party candidate in the May 1920 general election, he instead ran as an independent candidate in Bucharest. Around the same time, he was also named commercial attaché (class II) of Romania to Belgium, and became co-administrator of a Belgo-Romanian petroleum company in Brussels (alongside Henri Coandă).

In 1922, he officially resigned from the People's Party, and ran as head of a group called "Balanța dreptatei" ("The Scales of Justice") in the March 1922 Romanian general election. Shortly thereafter, he joined Nicolae Iorga's National Democratic Party. The same year, he established a residence in Rome.

== National Romanian Fascio ==
In December 1922, following Mussolini's March on Rome in Italy, Panaitescu-Vifor co-founded Fascia Națională Română ("National Romanian Fascio", FNR), alongside a committee which included Démètre C. Pădeanu, Gheorghe Băgulescu, Gheorghe Lungulescu, Valeriu Spătaru, V. Bazgan, and D. Rădulescu. The organisation claimed inspiration from Italy's Fascists and other Western fascist regimes, and espoused militarist, monarchist, and antisemitic views. Vifor thereafter resigned from Iorga's National Democratic Party in June 1923.

The group was short-lived, suffering from conflicts of leadership and police raids. In particular, a split within the FNR between Pădeanu and Panaitescu-Vifor, allegedly over an attempted merger with Elena Bacaloglu's similar National Italo-Romanian Fascist Movement (MNFIR), and a related violent attack on the Jewish editor of Adevărul, Iacob Rosenthal, (for which Panaitescu-Vifor was arrested), caused the quick disintegration of most of the FNR. Panaitescu-Vifor continued to lead a splinter movement which claimed the FNR name, alongside general Gheorghe Băgulescu, Valeriu Spătaru, and Sandy Bacaloglu (one of Elena Bacaloglu's brothers). The group published a vehemently antisemitic and xenophobic program, Doctrina Fascismului Român ("Doctrine of Romanian Fascism"), in 1924. Due to the ongoing hemorrhaging of members from the FNR, especially to A. C. Cuza's National Christian Defense League, the group disbanded in the late 1920s.

== Later career ==
Panaitescu-Vifor married an Italian woman, Leda Ponzanelli, in January 1923 or 1924, with whom he had a daughter, Rodica, and possibly a son, Titus Dumitru.

During and following his political involvement with the FNR, Panaitescu-Vifor began a number of business ventures in Romania, Italy, and Belgium, with a focus on agricultural and chemical imports and exports. He relocated to Venice in 1925, and worked there as an honorific commercial attaché. The same year, a pharmaceutical import business he ran from Bucharest was the subject of a scandal involving false advertising for syphilis medications. During this time, Panaitescu-Vifor also became a regular contributor to the Romanian economic newspaper Argus, publishing nationalist and pro-fascist articles with economic themes. Beginning in 1929, Panaitescu-Vifor also began to establish business ventures in Spain and Bulgaria.

Upon Tudor Arghezi's request, Panaitescu-Vifor also published a short story in the former's literary journal, Bilete de Papagal, in February 1928.

In the 1930s, Panaitescu-Vifor co-founded and served as director of a number of press agencies, including Agenția Telegrafice Internaționale „Oriente“ ("'Oriente' International Telegraphic Agency"). He also served as president of the Union Mondiale des agences télégraphiques privées ("World Union of Private Telegraphic Agencies"). He resided mainly in Italy, although returned to Belgium in 1936.

As director of "Oriente", he collaborated with a number of antisemitic and far-right newspapers in Romania, providing them with international news stories, including Buna Vestire, Nicolae Iorga's Neamul Românesc, Porunca Vremii, A. C. Cuza's Apărarea Națională, and Octavian Goga's Țara Noastră. He also served as contributor to Nichifor Crainic's antisemitic magazine Sfarmă-Piatră.

In the summer of 1940, Vifor was appointed press councillor of Romania in Rome, where he worked closely with Claudiu Isopescu, Aron Cotruș, and Vintilă Horia. After the establishment of the National Legionary State in September 1940, the press legation in Italy was reorganised into a general propaganda service. Vifor succeeded Isopescu as head of the propaganda service in May 1941.

Panaitescu-Vifor continued to do business in Italy, Switzerland, Portugal, and Romania throughout the 1940s, although ceased business in Romania after the establishment of the communist regime in 1948.

In the 1950s, Panaitescu-Vifor attempted to formulate a political-economic doctrine called the "New Universal Economy", publishing several texts economics in French.

Panaitescu-Vifor died at some point after 1967.
