= Bodu =

Bodu may refer to:

- Bodu River, tributary of the Râul Mare in Romania
- Sebastian Bodu (born 1970), Romanian politician
- The proper name of the star 95 Herculis
