= Radu D. Rosetti =

Romanian poet, playwright and attorney (1874–1964)

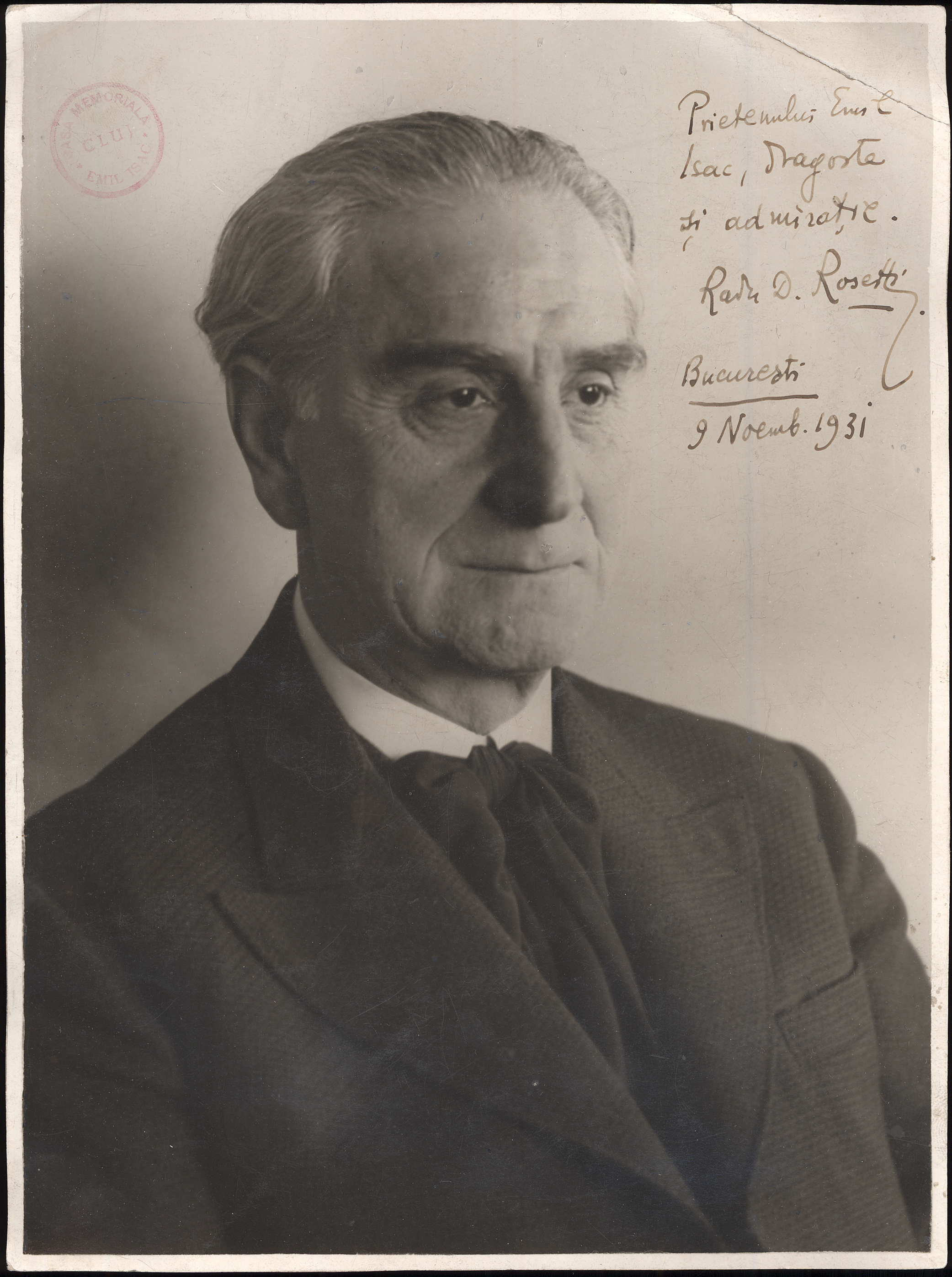
- Radu D. Rosetti in 1931
- Born: December 13 or 18, 1874; Bucharest, Kingdom of Romania
- Died: c. November 1964 (aged 89); Bucharest, Communist Romania
- Resting place: Bellu Cemetery, Bucharest
- Occupations: Lawyer, journalist, activist
- Spouses: Elena Bacaloglu; Marioara Naumescu; Lucreția Cristescu-Coroiu
- Writing career
- Period: 1890–1964
- Genres: Lyric poetry, epigram, madrigal, romanza, drama, verse drama, sketch story, travelogue, memoir
- Movements: Neoromanticism; Decadent movement Literatorul; Convorbiri Critice

Radu D. Rosetti or Rossetti (December 13 or 18, 1874 – c. November 1964) was a Romanian poet, playwright, and short story writer, also distinguished as an attorney and activist. The son of playwright-aristocrat Dimitrie Rosetti-Max and nephew of Titu Maiorescu, he had a troubled and rebellious youth, split between Romania and Austria-Hungary; during these debut years, he kept company with senior literary figures such as Ion Luca Caragiale and Alexandru Vlahuță. Graduating from the University of Bucharest at age 26, he was already a successful poet of neoromantic sensibilities, a published translator of plays and novels, and also famous for his unhappy marriage to the literary critic Elena Bacaloglu. Rosetti then switched to writing social-themed plays and stories of his professional life, earning a high profile as a defender of left-wing causes and impoverished clients. He traveled extensively and to exotic locations, publishing a number of volumes detailing his experiences.

From ca. 1913, Rosetti was also the public face of cremation activism, engaged in public polemics with the Romanian Orthodox Church. Although an artillery officer stationed in Chitila, Rosetti was mostly active during World War I as a patriotic orator and propagandist, later returning to his work at the Ilfov County bar association. During the interwar, he maintained contact with both the socialists and the "cremationists", while also experimenting as a Romanian Radio lecturer—but grew more conservative and passéist, attacking modernist literature on several occasions. This attitude consolidated his success as the author of memoirs, though he was rejected by both extremes of the political spectrum for his cherishing of a destitute social system. Largely forgotten during the early stages of Romanian communism, he withdrew to a garret. He was recovered in his late eighties by authors who were curious about his meetings with Romania's literary greats, as well as by humorists who appreciated his cultivation of the epigram genre. Rosetti died in his garret, shortly after returning to publishing.

== Biography ==
=== Early years ===
The future poet was born in Bucharest to Eftalia (or Natalia) Gheorghiu and Dimitrie Rosetti-Max. His father belonged to the boyar aristocracy of Wallachia, which was intertwined with the Phanariotes. His was a more obscure branch of the Rosetti family, descending from an unknown sibling of the 1770s Wallachian Prince, Emanuel Giani Ruset. His known ancestor, Scarlat Ruset (died 1821), had uncertain parentage, but was identified by all other Rosettis as a relative. Max's father was a Wallachian statesman, Aga Radu Rosetti, who headed the National Theater Bucharest under Prince Gheorghe Bibescu. In 1847, he was Prefect of Gorj County, noted for establishing obligatory medical examinations for the local prostitutes. Radu Sr was also Prefect of the Bucharest police during the reign of Barbu Dimitrie Știrbei, who kept him as a Paharnic, but ultimately sacked in 1855 for his alleged mistreatment of foreigners. In 1864, with Pantazi Ghica and N. T. Orășanu, he was publishing a satirical newspaper, Nichipercea. He died in 1868, after having squandered much of his and his wife's fortune.

Max was the author of light comedies that appeared in Convorbiri Literare, dubbed the "father of Romania's theatrical revue". He was also National Theater chairman, replacing the playwright Ion Luca Caragiale for a time. A collaborator of poet-satirist Iacob Negruzzi, he married Negruzzi's sister Maria; another one of Radu's paternal aunts, Ana, was the second wife of culture critic Titu Maiorescu. Radu D. Rosetti, who described himself as Maiorescu's nephew "by marriage", was born to Dimitrie and Natalia when the couple was unmarried; however, they did marry during the child's infancy. The couple divorced around 1889, with "Max" fathering two daughters, Noemi and Florica, from his second marriage, to Alexandra Costovici. Rosetti-Max died in France in October 1934, the result of a car accident.

As literary historian George Călinescu suggests, the parental split imposed a "rough life" on Radu, explaining why he, an aristocrat, maintained "quasi-proletarian" customs and sympathies. Rosetti himself noted in a 1942 article that: "I never made a fuss about my boyar's rank." He proudly listed himself as a "democrat" like C. A. Rosetti, founder of the left-liberal movement and "some kind of a cousin to my grandpapa". The same was noted by his younger friend Victor Eftimiu: "A boy of select birth, [Rosetti] did not linger in that scornful Olympus of his caste, but rather gave himself, spent himself, a troubadour and proletarian, wherever he found impetus, suffering, elation." The poet confessed that the only exception he ever made to his personal standards of "earning my few distinctions with the sweat of my brow" was when he visited a rich relative, Nicolae de Rosetti, and humored his genealogical pride in exchange for gifts of cash. Unusually, Rosetti was a contemporary of his homonymous relatives, social historian Radu Rosetti (1856–1926) and General Radu R. Rosetti (1877–1949). As early as 1914, he was making efforts to distinguish himself from the former. Since Rosetti the soldier was also engaged in writing, Radu D. joked to his readers: "If you liked my little work, know that I'm me [...], Radu D. Rosetti. If not, then I wasn't me, [...] but my homonym, General Radu Rosetti. Phone him at his house and call him names." Repeatedly confused with the general by reviewers such as George Panu, he adopted the initial "D." (signaling his patronymic) as a distinguishing mark.

=== Social revolt ===
Rosetti's first contacts with literary life include his attending, in 1889, the funeral of Romania's national poet, Mihai Eminescu. In later life, he validated the claim that Eminescu had been murdered by a fellow inmate, suggesting gross negligence by his attending physician, Alexandru A. Suțu; Rosetti noted seeing a fresh wound on Eminescu's body. Initially raised by his maternal grandmother, he was then sent to various schools, and in 1890 was studying at Andrei Șaguna High School in Brașov, then under Austro-Hungarian rule. He was passionate about the city, where he also learned to speak Hungarian "by necessity". It was here that he met poet Ștefan Octavian Iosif, together with whom he put out the hectographed magazine Păcăleandru. Rosetti's first published poem, appeared in Duminica journal in 1890, and was inspired by his grandmother's death. He recalled that his first-ever volume of poetry also came out that year—but noted that there was no merit to this contribution, rating it a "grave mistake".

Stubborn and rebelling against the prison-like conditions in boarding schools, Rosetti was then placed under private tutors, but did not manage to complete his studies. Reputedly, it was during these years that he first met Caragiale, who (despite being formally uneducated) worked as a teacher of Romanian history at one of the schools attended by young Rosetti. As Rosetti recalls, his unorthodox mentor would encourage his students not to snitch on each other, and, on one occasion, took them out of class so that they could listen to a song thrush. Philologist Sebastian Drăgulănescu believes that Caragialesque mannerisms found their way into Rosetti's prose, which preserved a form of "detached irony". He was saluted by Caragiale as Romania's second-greatest writer, after Caragiale himself. Later, Rosetti found out that this was a prank: Caragiale would pay that same compliment to other writers in his circle.

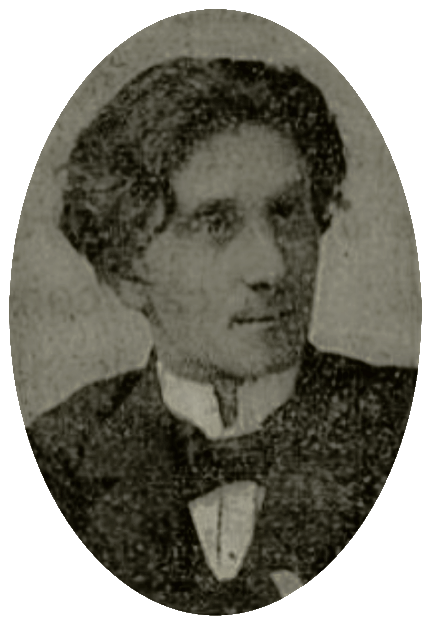
Rosetti in 1897

Leaving Matei Basarab High School, Rosetti worked for a while as a proofreader at Adevărul daily. With no other means to support himself, he drifted into homelessness, and had to sleep in the editorial offices, on public benches in Cișmigiu Gardens, or in the waiting room at Gara de Nord. His verse appeared in Vieața with the support of Alexandru Vlahuță, through whom he came to know Nicolae Grigorescu and Barbu Ștefănescu Delavrancea, while also maintaining contacts with Caragiale. The latter also published his poetry in the review Vatra, which allowed Rosetti to preserve links with other Romanian magazines published in Austria-Hungary. Constantin Mille, his Adevărul employer, wrote the preface to his second short volume of verse, Foi de toamnă ("Autumn Leafs", 1892). His lifelong poetic work, described by Călinescu as "provincial and rustic" neoromanticism, comprised a large number of epigrams, madrigals and romanzas; some of the work showed the influence of Traian Demetrescu, and, through him, that of Heinrich Heine. Drăgulănescu proposes that "Foi de toamnă outlines the dominant aspects in both Rosetti's poetry and prose: talkative, prone to improvisation, with a taste for dramatic art, the poet constructs miniature dialogues, puts anecdotes in verse, either in tones of folklore or in the grave and pensive tone of [...] Miron Costin."

In 1894, Rosetti also debuted as an epigrammatist in Graiul magazine, which was edited by Ilarie Chendi. A volume of such works came out that year, as Epigrame, and other volumes of verse followed in quick succession: Din inimă ("From the Heart", 1895), Sincere ("Sincere Ones", 1896), Duioase ("Soothing Ones", 1897). In his review of Sincere, Alexandru Antemireanu noted that Rosetti's "sweet melancholy" was highly popular with the public: "they love him as one loves a gentle child, a child who never hurts anyone". This gentleness was nevertheless interrupted by samples of social realism, including a translation from Jean Richepin. According to Antemireanu, this was a "stupid" selection, "glorifying barbarity and profanity". For a while, with Ludovic Dauș, Rosetti put out the literary magazine Doina—named after the folk singing style.

=== With the Symbolists ===
To 1898, Rosetti was one of the regulars at literary gatherings in Fialcovsky Coffeehouse (also attended by his father), where he met Alexandru Macedonski, Mircea Demetriade, and actor Ion Livescu. The latter recalled that Rosetti was "as gentle and soft as his poetry, as thin and as supple as a reed, with long blond hair and dreamy eyes". Macedonski also co-opted him to write for Literatorul, though other members of that circle, including Aristide Cantilli, regarded Rosetti as culturally irrelevant. While not affiliated with Macedonski's Symbolist movement, Rosetti had some ideological links with various of its exponents—and was described by Cantilli as an imitator of Macedonski. In 1913, critic Gheorghe Savul included him in the overlapping "decadent movement", alongside Symbolists Ștefan Petică and Iuliu Cezar Săvescu. All three were also followers of a "disillusioned socialism", left isolated following the collapse of the Workers' Party; but were also attached to Romanian nationalism, and inspired by Eminescu.

With Săvescu and Vlahuță, Rosetti was a noted presence in V. A. Urechia's magazine, Biblioteca Familiei, which sought to reconcile Symbolism with the staples of socialist didactic art. Stylistically, he was an early and episodic influence on young Symbolists such as Eftimiu and Ion Minulescu; at that stage, Rosetti was involved in the project to erect a statue of Demetrescu at Craiova, arguing that this had been Demetrescu's explicit wish. His influence on the Symbolists did not refer just to his poetic standard, but also to his lifestyle: as Eftimiu recalls, he made his colleagues envious of his physical beauty and sentimental adventures. Although Eftimiu believes that Rosetti was wholly indifferent to Baudelaire and Verlaine, he in fact revered the latter. In 1935 he recalled that he chanced upon aging and "stiff drunk" Verlaine while walking around Paris: "It seemed to me that even his inebriation was something grand and beautiful".

In 1895, Rosetti took his first diploma, graduating cum laude from the Bucharest Conservatory for Dramatic Arts. In order to also enter the University of Bucharest, he obtained a high school degree from Brussels. He married a first time, to the novelist and literary critic Elena Bacaloglu. They were engaged on December 19, 1896, and had their religious wedding in January of the next year; politician Nicolae Filipescu was their godfather. They soon after had a daughter, Natalia "Lia". However, in early 1898, Rosetti became dissatisfied with his material condition, moving out of the family home and suing for divorce. The despaired Bacaloglu shot herself, but survived. The event shocked Rosetti, but was recalled with some enthusiasm by Eftimiu, who noted that Rosetti had "avenged the tribe", showing that poets could be the seducers, not just the seduced. Rosetti and Bacaloglu were divorced by 1899, with Elena marrying the literary theorist Ovid Densusianu in 1902. She kept most of Rosetti's personal belongings, and allegedly sold his collection of books.

In 1900, Rosetti ultimately graduated from the Bucharest law faculty with a thesis on press infractions in Romanian law. He performed service in the Romanian Land Forces, reaching the rank of Lieutenant in an artillery regiment stationed at Chitila fort. His civilian career saw him debuting as a bailiff for the Ilfov County tribunal. After working in minor positions for the tribunals of Brăila and Constanța, by 1903 he had been advanced to prosecutor for the Prahova County court. Living in Ploiești, he married and divorced a Marioara Naumescu, with whom he had a second daughter, Miorica. This period also saw his debut as a dramatic author, with plays on social topics. In the 1898 O lecție ("A Lesson"), the wife of a plagiarist expresses her contempt by pursuing an adulterous affair and getting pregnant; Păcate ("Sins"), which appeared in 1901, unveils the love triangles that break apart a middle-class family. Both plays were taken up by the National Theater Bucharest, with Livescu in one of the title roles. In June 1900, O lecție was performed at the National Theater Budapest, as the first Romanian play to be performed by a Hungarian troupe.

With time, Rosetti also focused more fully on translation work, which he began with a version of Richepin's L'Étoile, published in 1896 and taken up by the same National Theater in 1898. Livescu, who starred in it as Sir Richard, called the work "excellent". In 1901, he returned to poetry with the collection Cele din urmă ("The Very Last Ones"), comprising pieces by himself and translations from his favorite poets. The reviewer at Familia magazine described him as "pessimistic, but always coquette". Rosetti published versions of Robinson Crusoe (1900) and Gulliver's Travels (1905), followed in 1908 by selections from Guy de Maupassant and André Gill. He also participated in rendering homage to Princess Dowager Marie of Edinburgh: with Iosif, Dimitrie Anghel, Cincinat Pavelescu and George Ranetti, he co-wrote a poem welcoming Marie to the Tinerimea Artistică salon of March 1906. His former wife Marioara went on to marry another epigrammatist, Ion Ionescu-Quintus, who was also a provincial leader of the National Liberal Party; their son, Mircea Ionescu-Quintus, would also take up poetry in the genre, and eventually become party leader. Rosetti remained close friends with the family, and visited them in their home. He was at the time married to Lucreția Cristescu-Coroiu, who spent 20 of their 21 years together bedridden with illness.

=== Marginalization ===
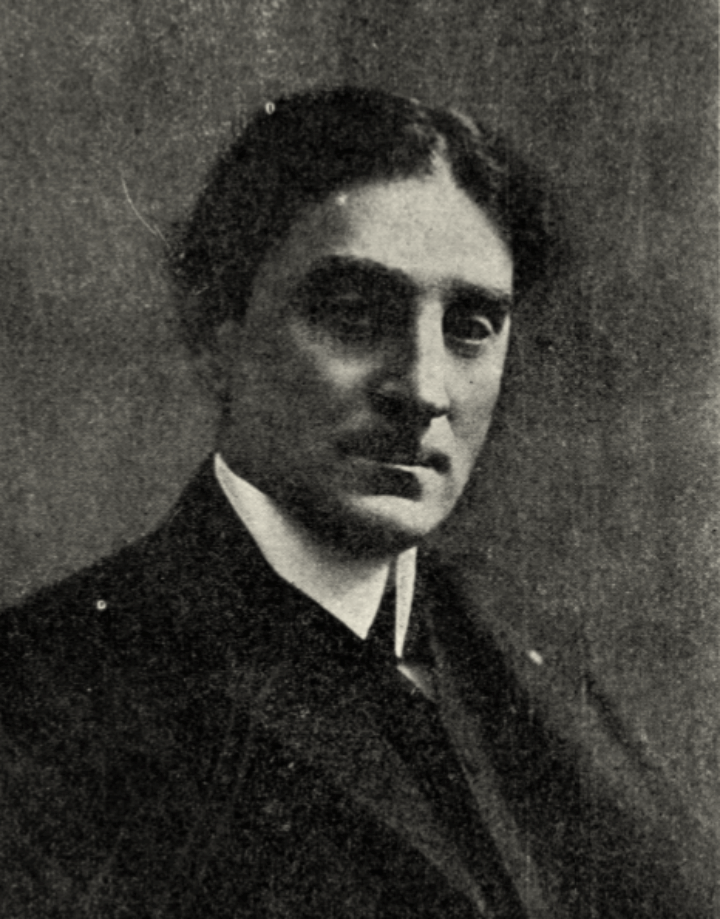
Rosetti in 1912

Rosetti himself became an incessant traveler ("the most well-traveled Romanian writer", as he himself claimed). His first journeys throughout Europe, taking him to Svalbard at a time when few Romanians had even heard of the place, were recorded in accounts which doubled as travel guides. Some of these were first collected, alongside sketch stories, in the volume Printre Picăturĭ ("Between Drops", 1903). As argued by Călinescu, they are entirely devoid of "acuteness of perception and artistic preparation." By contrast, Drăgulănescu contrarily finds these to be the "most enduring part" of Rosetti's literary output, a "mixture of rigor and fantasy, of gossip, but also of pensive solitude". Rosetti "does not 'instruct us' about the countries, roads, ships, but about the secret of traveling as a unique, fundamental experience." In 1905, Rosetti visited the Russian Empire, appearing as a defense lawyer at Odesa. By his own account, he had an affair with female bodybuilder, until he got scared that she would physically harm him. In autumn 1906, he traveled to Egypt—coincidentally at the same time as other Romanian intellectuals, including Timoleon Pisani and Constantin Istrati. Both Istrati and Rosetti left notes of their journeys, which are some of the earliest Romanian impressions of Egypt; Rosetti, who reached Luxor and Aswan, displayed his pity for the fellaheen he met along the way.

A 1904 volume of verse, Din toate ("Some of Everything") was panned by the Symbolist Emil Isac in Familia: Isac believed that it announced Rosetti's death as a poet. However, as noted by the same Familia, Rosetti remained "one of the most widely read authors" in the Romanian Old Kingdom, his style being "accessible". By 1908, he was a regular contributor to Convorbiri Critice, put out by the traditionalist Mihail Dragomirescu, and to the tourism magazine Printre Hotare. He was also recovered in the 1910s by the nationalist historian Nicolae Iorga, who viewed Rosetti's marginalization as unfair, and published his "lively" travelogues in Neamul Românesc review. He sketched out a work of verse drama about Jesus, publishing fragments of it in a 1910 issue of Noua Revistă Română. He was still working on it in 1925; according to a 1938 article, a "religious-themed play" by Rosetti had been banned "back in the day".

In April 1911, the Romanian Theatrical Society elected Rosetti on its first Steering Committee, alongside Ranetti, George Diamandy, A. de Herz, and Paul Gusty. With Diamandy, Rosetti also organized a Literary Circle at Comoedia Theater, and as such also a February 1912 festival honoring Caragiale. In March, as a delegate of the Society, he welcomed to Richepin to Bucharest and spoke at his banquet. His work appeared alongside that of Symbolist poets in the magazines Ilustrația and Noi Pagini Literare, but was shunned by the more radical Symbolists and socialists at Facla. Here, Rosetti was listed alongside Constantin Banu, Petre Locusteanu and Maica Smara as a "triumphant mediocrity", a literary "street organ".

Rosetti had a lengthy career as a defense lawyer, an experience that informed certain of his literary output, including memoirs such as Din sala pașilor pierduți ("From the Hall of Wasted Pacing", 1922). As both Călinescu and Eftimiu note, he was one of several Romanian orators inspired by the style and social-justice ideology of François Coppée (whom Rosetti had met, and whom he "uncanningly resembled physically"). Rosetti would often take no pay for his lawyer's services, or would charge his more destitute clients ad libitum ("whatever you can afford; if you can't spare anything, that's not a problem"). He was especially involved in pleading for left-wing activists prosecuted by the state—or, as he put it, "trials which allowed me to act against social injustice." He and Petre Grădișteanu obtained acquittal for Vasile Kogălniceanu, who had been arrested as an instigator of the 1907 Peasants' Revolt. In 1909, he and Mille failed to obtain an acquittal for I. C. Frimu, Gheorghe Cristescu and Panait Istrati, who had been charged with sedition. Rosetti was featured in the first-ever issue of Banu and Locusteanu's Flacăra with a piece titled Revoltă ("Revolt"), described by Zaharia Stancu, the left-wing novelist and cultural promoter, as a political statement.

Rosetti also represented himself in his conflicts with the literary magazine Viața Romînească after its columnist Constantin Stere ridiculed Rosetti's poetry; as Rosetti notes, this review was unfair, since it focused mainly on poems he had published as a teenager. The case was heard before the Court of Cassation, which ruled in Rosetti's favor. Another leading cause for him was the advocacy of cremation, on which he spoke at the Romanian Atheneum in March 1913. As a result, newspapers reported (probably exaggerating) that some 3,000 people had joined the "cremationist" movement. Such early affiliates included politician Constantin Dissescu, physician Haralambie Botescu, and banker Aristide Blank. The Rosetti speech fed into satirical commentary by Tudor Arghezi and Ranetti, the latter in particular noting that Rosetti was planning to strip funeral artists, undertakers and florists of their business. Rosetti responded in Ranetti's Furnica with an ironic piece, in which he informed readers that they could still bury their ashes to maintain the funeral trade. A figure of importance in the "cremationist" trend, which openly challenged the funeral customs of the Romanian Orthodox Church, Rosetti would later shun moderates such as Dissescu—who, Rosetti claimed, had betrayed the cause.

=== World War I and cremation activism ===
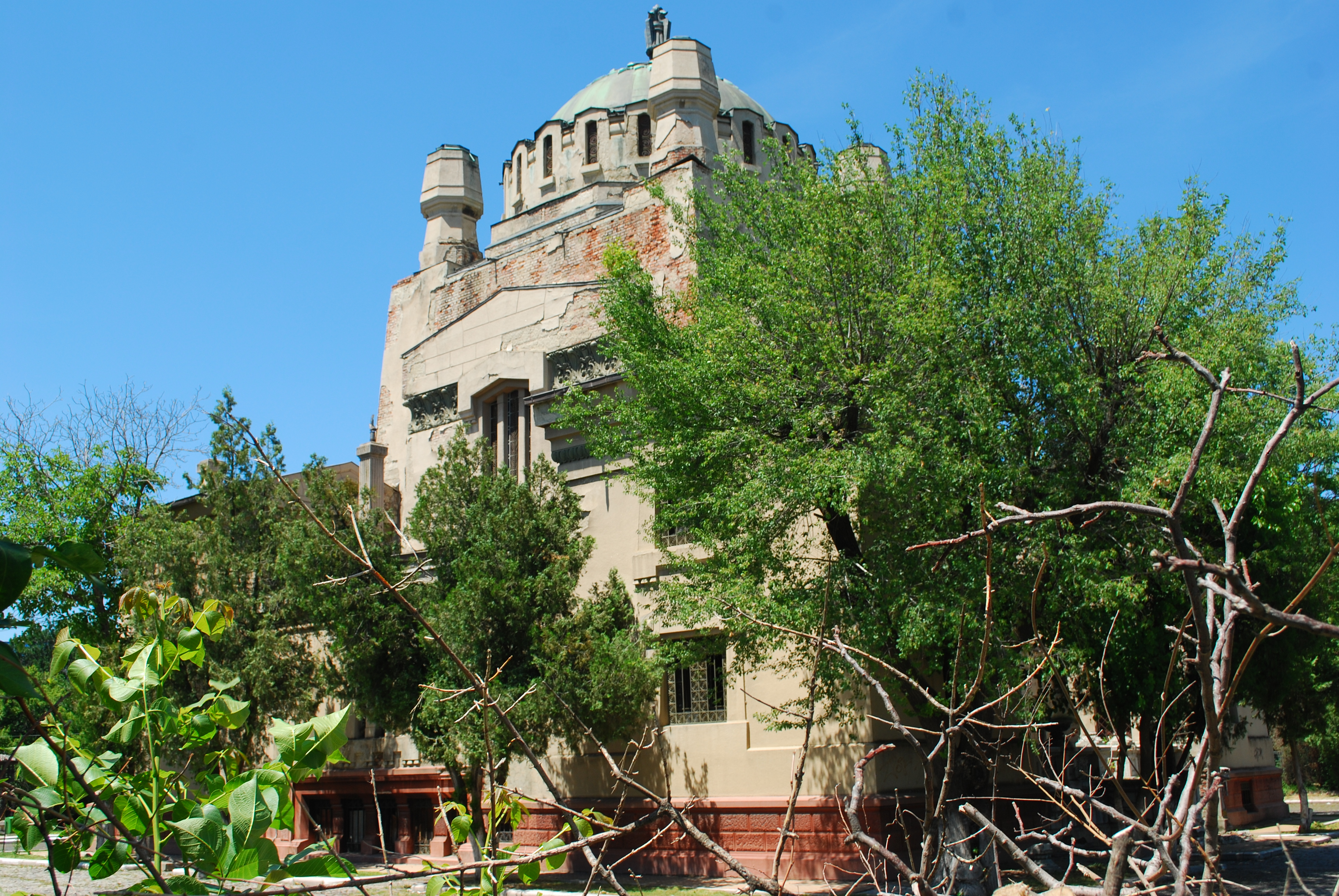
The Bucharest Crematorium, set up by Rosetti and his fellow "cremationists"

Shortly after the outbreak of World War I, with Romania still neutral territory, the Francophile Rosetti campaigned for Romania to join the Entente Powers, and tackled the issue during debates at the Romanian Writers' Society. However, he earned recognition for his court defense of Hasan Tahsin, would-be assassin of the pro-Entente campaigners Noel and Charles Buxton. In the end, Romania joined the Entente, and Rosetti was called under arms. Unexpectedly, he was moved to a horse artillery unit, but was shielded from active service by General Alexandru Averescu, and only assigned to give patriotic speeches to his troops on the front line. During the subsequent siege of Bucharest, Rosetti was at Periș with the staff of Constantin Prezan—Ion G. Duca, who joined him there, recalled that he "made himself look important". His subordinates included Cristache Ciolac, famous in civilian life as a Lăutar performer, and honored by Rosetti with a sonnet.

The Army headquarters eventually withdrew to Iași. Rosetti lived with his fellow satirist Pavelescu at the latter's family home on Păcurari Street; like Pavelescu, he had his writings published by a local newspaper, Opinia, providing them with a meager but steady income. Rosetti was afterward assigned to write for the military propaganda magazine, România. In January 1918, while the Moldavian Democratic Republic began its process of unification with Romania, he signed up to a manifesto calling for the cultural unification of all Romanian-inhabited regions; other signers included Minulescu, Ion Agârbiceanu, Nichifor Crainic, Mihail Sadoveanu, and Mihail Sorbul. Rosetti, discharged from the army as a Captain, eventually returned to Bucharest following the November 1918 Armistice. In 1919, he and Mille were part of a defense team that represented the leadership of the Socialist Party of Romania, tried for their role in a general strike of the previous December. He was an independent candidate for the Ilfov seat in the Assembly in the election of November 1919, but only took 5,234 votes.

Rosetti remained generally opposed to the Viața Romînească circle, but was on friendly terms with its editor, Mihail Sevastos; from 1925, the two were working together at Adevărul and Dimineața. The collaboration ended abruptly when Rosetti asked to have his picture published next to that of historian Radu Rosetti, in hopes of discouraging the persistent confusion between them. Sevastos refused to have Adevărul turned into a "shop window", prompting the angered poet to withdraw from the enterprise and switch to a rival newspaper, Universul. In the 1920s, Rosetti had some of his writing appearing in Viața Romînească, as well as in newspapers and magazines throughout Greater Romania—including Îndreptarea, Rampa, Ziarul Științelor și Călătoriilor, Cele Trei Crișuri, Di Granda, Foaia Tinerimii, Ilustrația, Izbânda, Lumea Copiilor, Lumea Ilustrată, Poetul, Sănătatea, Săptămâna Muncii Intelectuale și Artistice, and Viața Studențească. By 1930, his work was also featured in Omul Liber, Basarabia, Brazda, Ecoul, Propilee Literare, Revista Politică, and Revista Subofițerilor. He also published translations in Orizontul, as well as legal literature in Curierul Judiciar, Revista Penală, and later in Palatul de Justiție and Poliția Modernă.

In 1923, Rosetti rallied with the left-leaning League of Human Rights, founded by Constantin Costa-Foru and Vasile Stroescu. In March, alongside the forensic scientist Mina Minovici and the politician Grigore Trancu-Iași, he founded Nirvana Society (later Cenușa, "The Ash"), which operated the Bucharest Crematorium. However, when his wife died in 1926, she was conventionally buried at Bellu Cemetery. In December 1923, he also returned at the Atheneum to advocate cremation, and boasted 6,000 new recruits, although his interest in the matter continued to fuel ridicule and provided subject matter to the epigrammatist N. Crevedia. It was also met with protests from Orthodox leaders such as Iuliu Scriban and Dumitru Popescu-Moșoaia, who noted, in public disputations with Rosetti, that Nirvana was channeling public funds; however, most clergymen were by then passively reconciled with the practice. A more serious challenge came from religious-right newspapers such as Curentul, Cuvântul, and Glasul Monahilor, who backed priest Marin C. Ionescu, sued for slander by Minovici. Rosetti was the latter's lawyer, himself accused by the Orthodox lobby of consciously lying to promote his client's interests.

1929 caricature of Rosetti, by Victor Ion Popa

Journalist Romulus Dianu, who visited Rosetti in 1925, noted that the cases he handled of the time were mostly penal, with "defendants [who were] mostly freed on bail." Publishing volumes of his wartime memoirs—Remember (1921) and Obolul meu ("My Contribution", 1922)—, Rosetti joined Emil Cerbu in compiling an anthology of modern love verse, Cartea dragostei ("The Book of Love", 1922). He followed up with definitive collections of his scattered prose and poetry: Poezii ("Poems", 1926), Eri ("Yesterday", 1931), Pagini alese ("Selected Pages", 1935), Vechituri ("Old Things", 1936), and Instantanee turistice ("A Tourist's Highlights", 1939). Of these, Vechituri drew notice with its adoring portrait of Queen Marie, seen by Rosetti as responsible for Romania's diplomatic victory at the end of the world war. His work in travel writing was complemented by his 1935 introduction to Mihai Tican Rumano's account of life in the Ethiopian Empire. It underscored Rosetti's admiration for Tican Rumano, who had "braved unimaginable exhaustion", "unaided by any 'Officialdom' or private sponsor". In May of the same year, Rosetti was feted at the Atheneum upon the initiative of his friend, Trancu-Iași. Contributors to the ceremony included Ion Marin Sadoveanu, Ionel Perlea, and Ion Sân-Giorgiu.

=== Late interwar and World War II ===
Rosetti's own memoirs, appearing in book form and in other formats, were treasured by the reading public, and were featured in Romanian Radio broadcasts. As noted by Eftimiu, they conserved the universe of the more senior readers, who bought the books to regain contact with the prewar world. Writing in 1931, Isac also saluted in them the return of the old 1890s poet, who, although "belated", offered "a compendium of civilization, affection, and true Romanianism." Rosetti himself was avowedly backward-looking and uninterested in modernist literature. He told Dianu that Futurism was already dead by 1925, and that "the orientation in Romanian literature has returned to following the right path". In a 1935 interview with Mihail Sebastian of Rampa, Rosetti argued that Dada and Futurism were "here today, gone tomorrow", declaring that he only read works by his own generation colleagues. Reportedly, he only showed up once at meetings held by the moderately modernist club Sburătorul, in what was read by the regulars as a "courtesy visit".

The aging lawyer-activist, unanimously elected dean of the Ilfov Bar Association in 1933, continued to involve himself in causes other than cremation. Prior to the election of 1931, he represented Averescu in a civil lawsuit against journalist Bazil Gruia, who had referred to the general as an "assassin of the peasants", for his role in the 1907 revolt. Although, as he noted, he regarded himself as Averescu's political adversary, he agreed to defend the "great commander who had led our troops to victory". Some four years later, he found himself challenged by his peers after having obtained that an aged man, universally known as "Tata Moșu", be convicted for the murder of Sofia Aslan. During the retrial, which saw evidence piling up against Safia's son, Guy Aslan, Rosetti appeared to defend his version of events. As recalled by writer Vlaicu Bârna, he was damaged during the affair, with a "sad reputation over having obtained that an innocent man be convicted". By 1936, Rosetti was also interested in the biography of four-wars veteran Peneș Curcanul, traveling to Vaslui in hopes of acquiring his unpublished letters.

During World War II, Rosetti was an occasional contributor to Universul, where, in 1940, he published a piece romanticizing the history of Moșilor quarter. In March of that year, Rosetti joined the defense team of a Jewish industrialist, Max Auschnitt, who stood accused of having defrauded the Romanian state. Addressing the judges, Rosetti argued that his client was fully assimilated, and that his fortune had been exclusively a product of "[Auschnitt's] labor and skill." A short while after, the fascist National Legionary State was established, supporting a renewed offensive against the "cremationist" movement: by 1941, Education Minister Traian Brăileanu was proposing to disestablish the Bucharest Crematorium, describing it as anti-Christian.

In June 1941, under the new government formed by Ion Antonescu, Rosetti contributed to a Vremea special issue commemorating Nicolae Iorga, killed by the Iron Guard the previous year. In June 1942, Editura Cugetarea issued a final volume of his recollections, Odinioară ("Once"); literary scholar Șerban Cioculescu curated the edition. It features chapters on the more picturesque figures who had crossed the author's path, for instance Macedonski, Claymoor, Nicolae Fleva, Alceu Urechia, and Alexandru Bogdan-Pitești. Much of the work was dedicated to deriding historical urban policies, and in particular to the memory of horsecars. At the time of its publishing, Odinioară won praise from Dianu in Curentul, who saw it as equal to memoirs by Coppée, Ion Ghica and Iacob Negruzzi. Dianu concludes: "[Rosetti is] a man of yesteryear, who honors his life, a type of man that is unfortunately no longer produced." Literary chronicler George Sbârcea shortlisted Odinioară and George Ciprian's Cutia cu maimuțe as the two best works of autobiography to have appeared in 1942.

As noted by Cioculescu, one of Rosetti's critics was Mica Bogdan-Pitești. She resented her late husband's portrayal in the book, noting that Rosetti had once "scrounged off" Alexandru's wealth. For different reasons, Rosetti's book was censured by the far-right Gândirea. Its literary reviewer Nicolae Roșu saw Rosetti as "despondent and washed-out, pining for a useless world", "superficial and gelatinous", his ink "drenched in mothballs". He also denounced the memoirist as a "Knight of Malta, that is to say a Freemason." The characters in the book, Roșu claimed, were tinged by "adultery and concubinage", their luxury made possible by "millions of peasant slaves, toiling in sorrow"; the work itself was "addressed to those few fossils to have survived the great social uplift." Some of these statements were formally retracted by the editor, Nichifor Crainic—to whom Rosetti had sent a letter of protest. Clarifications included a note according to which Rosetti "is not a Freemason, his name absent from all lists that have ever been made public."

=== Advanced old age ===
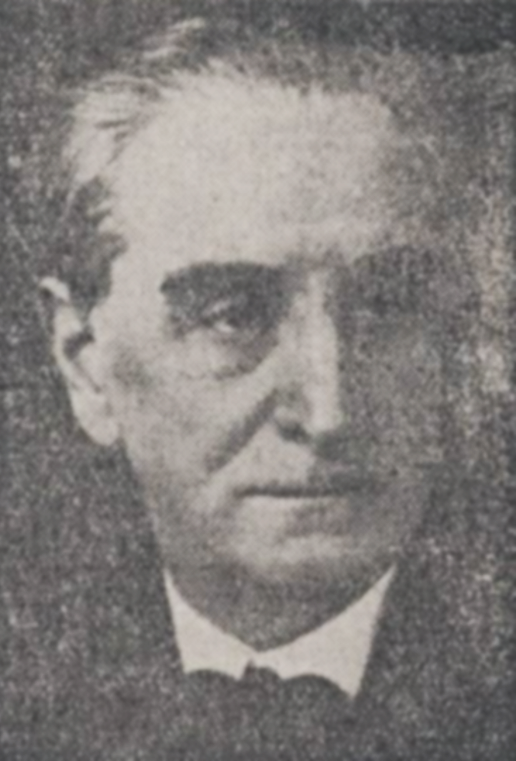
Rosetti in the 1940s

Rosetti's other work under Antonescu included the preface to Mircea Ionescu-Quintus' debut volume, Haz de necaz, which appeared in 1943. The August 1944 coup briefly restored democracy to Romania. In its aftermath, Rosetti returned as a satirist, with contributions to Sergiu Milorian's magazine, Papagalul. He was also interested in the revival of social activism, and, in November 1945, spoke at the Atheneum about the "citizen-poets", offering posthumous praise to Vasile Alecsandri and Constantin Dobrogeanu-Gherea. In the late 1940s, he also resumed his polemic with the modernists, being criticized in Rampa as "a sausage-maker that has stumbled into a Picasso exhibit late one evening"; according to Rampa, he resented the avant-garde because it "has been, and is, cutting off his own flower tendrils as they were shooting up toward that sky of (what else but) blue".

The establishment of a Romanian communist regime in 1948 brought on more ridicule targeting the aged writer. In 1950, critic Paul Georgescu included Rosetti's Duioase on a list of obsolete works: "The bourgeoisie was reading and growing enthusiastic about books that no one today would even dare to open." Rosetti lived those years in isolation. Largely forgotten by the public, he inhabited a garret in Bucharest (possibly located in Pasajul Român area, outside Calea Victoriei). Here, he kept an urn destined for his ashes, leaving only the date of his death to be completed by the engraver. He was tended to by a female servant, giving her his impractically large pendulum clock; she tried to sell the item, but had trouble finding a buyer. Lia, Rosetti's daughter by Bacaloglu, was also living in Bucharest. She spent decades as a government clerk before being sacked by the communists. In the 1950s, Rosetti was frequenting the literary parties held at Ion Larian Postolache's home, on Dobroteasa Street, alongside former rival Crevedia, Virgil Carianopol, Ion Buzdugan, and Crevedia's son Eugen Barbu.

Later that decade, there was a revival of the epigram, with Rosetti being recognized as a "classic of the genre". In his eighties, he was allowed into the Writers' Union of Romania—and received small sums, as well as dinner invitations, from its literary fund, care of poet Dumitru Corbea. In a 1957 piece in Gazeta Literară, Cioculescu drew attention to Rosetti as the only living source who could explain mysterious details in Caragiale's biography; he also called Rosetti an "evergreen octogenarian, who records his epigrams with the same success as ever". Epigrammatist George Corbu notes that Rosetti's contributions from the 1920s were now plagiarized by younger authors, but also that Rosetti himself was plagiarizing from C. Ilea in one piece for Urzica magazine. Rosetti published another work of recollections, Spicuiri ("Gleanings"), in 1958. It included an overview of his various interviews with Ciolac. That year, in an interview with G. Cristobald, he announced his planning of five other books, including one about an intended journey into the Soviet Union.

According to Corbea, Rosetti's last wife was his unnamed landlady, who also collected his pension. Affected by blindness during his last years, he agreed to dictate scenes from his literary life to Horia Oprescu. As noted in 1971 by Stancu, the elderly satirist Alexandru Cazaban "pretended to have a feud with the poet Radu D. Rosetti. Each one claimed to be older than the other." Rosetti died in his garret in late 1964—this was announced by Oprescu in November, by means of Gazeta Literară; Oprescu defined his friend as: "A destitute youth who became a scholar; an assiduous worker; a traveler always enamored with new horizons; an honest newspaperman. And, above all — a good man!" Oprescu also noted that he himself was not sure of Rosetti's precise age, but that he seemed youthful and serene to his last moment. Shortly before, his contributions to medical humor had been featured in a best-selling anthology, put out by N. Tofan. According to his wish, he was cremated. His urn was deposed in Lucreția's tomb at Bellu. Writing in 1968, critic Remus Zăstroiu referred to Rosetti as "all but forgotten". Though he viewed Rosetti as less relevant than other authors of his age, he pleaded for a contextual understanding, in terms of his "social and cultural framework". Bârna provided a contrasting assessment in 1997, when he rated Rosetti as an "amateur-tier" writer, but "a lawyer of significance."

== Sources ==
- George Baiculescu, Georgeta Răduică, Neonila Onofrei, Publicațiile periodice românești (ziare, gazete, reviste). Vol. II: Catalog alfabetic 1907–1918. Supliment 1790–1906. Bucharest: Editura Academiei, 1969.
- Lucian Boia, "Germanofilii". Elita intelectuală românească în anii Primului Război Mondial. Bucharest: Humanitas, 2010. ISBN 978-973-50-2635-6
- George Călinescu, Istoria literaturii române de la origini pînă în prezent. Bucharest: Editura Minerva, 1986.
- Dumitru Corbea, Memorii. Bucharest: Cartea Românească, 1982.
- Viorel Cosma, Figuri de lăutari. Bucharest: Editura Muzicală, 1960.
- G. Cristobald, "Momentul literar. De vorbă cu Radu D. Rosetti. În preajma apariției volumului Spicuiri", in Gazeta Literară, Vol. V, Issue 9, February 1958, pp. 1, 6.
- Ileana-Stanca Desa, Dulciu Morărescu, Ioana Patriche, Adriana Raliade, Iliana Sulică, Publicațiile periodice românești (ziare, gazete, reviste). Vol. III: Catalog alfabetic 1919–1924. Bucharest: Editura Academiei, 1987.
- Ileana-Stanca Desa, Dulciu Morărescu, Ioana Patriche, Cornelia Luminița Radu, Adriana Raliade, Iliana Sulică, Publicațiile periodice românești (ziare, gazete, reviste). Vol. IV: Catalog alfabetic 1925-1930. Bucharest: Editura Academiei, 2003. ISBN 973-27-0980-4
- Sebastian Drăgulănescu, "Rosetti, Radu D.", in Dicționarul general al literaturii române. P/R, pp. 690–691. Bucharest: Editura Univers Enciclopedic, 2016. ISBN 973-637-138-7
- Ion G. Duca, Amintiri politice, II. Munich: Jon Dumitru-Verlag, 1981.
- Victor Eftimiu, Portrete și amintiri. Bucharest: Editura pentru literatură, 1965.
- Adriana Iliescu, "Scriitori și curente. Sateliții Literatorului. I. Liga Ortodoxă. II. Revista Modernă", in Viața Românească, Vol. XXI, Issue 5, May 1968, pp. 75–83.
- Nicolae Iorga, Istoria literaturii românești contemporane. II: În căutarea fondului (1890–1934). Bucharest: Editura Adevĕrul, 1934.
- Ion Livescu, Amintiri și scrieri despre teatru. Bucharest: Editura pentru literatură, 1967.
- Ioan Massoff, Istoria Teatrului Național din București: 1877—1937. Bucharest, Alcaly, [n. y.].
- Constantin Titel Petrescu, Socialismul în România. 1835 – 6 septembrie 1940. Bucharest: Dacia Traiana, [n. y.].
- George Potra, Din Bucureștii de altădată. Bucharest: Editura științifică și enciclopedică, 1981.
- Radu R. Rosetti, Familia Rosetti, II. Celelalte ramuri (Studii și cercetări XLVII). Bucharest: Romanian Academy & Monitorul Oficial, 1940.
- Nicolae Roșu, "Cronica literară. Radu D. Rosetti: Odinioară", in Gândirea, Issue 9/1942, pp. 527–529.
- Marius Rotar, History of Modern Cremation in Romania. Newcastle upon Tyne: Cambridge Scholars Publishing, 2013. ISBN 978-1-4438-4542-7
- Mihail Sevastos, "Amintiri de la Adevărul Literar și Artistic. Sfaturile lui G. Ibrăileanu", in Iașul Literar, Issue 3/1966, pp. 55–57.
- Ioana Ursu, Ioan Lăcustă, "În București, acum 50 ani", in Magazin Istoric, July 1992, pp. 78–82.
