= Romanian Constitutional Bar =

- Territory: Europe: Romania, Spain
- Ethnicity: Romanians
- Activities: corruption, forgeries, fraud

The Constitutional Bar (Romanian: Baroul Constituțional), also known as the Romanian Constitutional Bar (Romanian: Baroul Constituțional Român) or the Bota Bar (Baroul Bota) and which falsely claimed to be the National Association of Romanian Bars (Uniunea Națională a Barourilor din România) in order to obtain material benefits, also called UNBR Bota (UNBR Bota) by then; was a parallel, illegal bar, lacking legal personality, established by Pompiliu Bota in 2002 as an alternative to the "classic bars" of Romanian lawyers, reorganized after 1990 within UNBR, which is the genuine Romanian bar association.

The Constitutional Bar had as object of activity the practice of law as lawyers by persons who legally did not have the right to practice as lawyers, according to Art. 348 of the new Romanian Criminal Code (Art. 281 of the old code). It also violates Art. 367 of the Criminal Code, as an organization that has the purpose of committing crimes or organized criminal group.

== History ==
In 2002, the Deva Court recognized the legal personality of the "Bonis Potra" Charitable Association, which had included in its Statute, among other objects of activity, "the establishment of bars in compliance with the provisions of the Romanian Constitution, the provisions of international human rights pacts and conventions.".

After the finality of the court decisions, the "board of directors" of the Romanian Constitutional Bar was constituted, and Pompiliu Bota called himself "dean". On January 17, 2003, the "Annual Panel of Constitutional Bar Lawyers" was drawn up, in which 35 people were registered, 20 of whom were granted the pseudo-right to draw conclusions in courts and courts of appeal, the professional offices being located in Orăștie, Alba Iulia, Baia Mare, Timișoara, Reșița, Piatra Neamț, Satu Mare, Negrești Oaș, Turnu Severin, Petroșani and Bucharest.

It is obvious nonsense for a charity to be able to set up bars, unions, foundations or trade unions, as only courts of law can legally set up organizations, and they cannot delegate this prerogative to a private association. That is why the Constitutional Bar was never a legally established organization. There is no court ruling that explicitly provides for the establishment of the Constitutional Bar. The "Bonis Potra" Association or the "Figaro Potra" Association could not issue court rulings. Or, even stronger: even a court is not allowed to establish a UNBR, only the Parliament can do that.

=== Non-unitary practice of courts ===
The courts did not have a unitary practice in assessing the quality of lawyer of the members of the Constitutional Bar.

The following trends could be identified in the practice of the courts:

1. accepting and allowing members of the Constitutional Bar to provide legal assistance and representation;
2. to consider the members of the "Constitutional Bar" to present "evidence regarding the quality of lawyer under the conditions of Law no. 51/1995" and, in their absence, not to be allowed to provide assistance and representation;
3. to qualify the mandate of representation as being given to a non-lawyer and, in accordance with the provisions of art. 68 paragraph 4 of the Code of Civil Procedure, the members of the mentioned bar are not allowed to draw conclusions.

=== Criminal conviction of Pompiliu Bota ===
On April 5, 2012, the Deva Court decided to sentence Pompiliu Bota, dean of the Constitutional Bar, to 6 months imprisonment for the unlawful exercise of a regulated profession and to 6 months imprisonment for the crime of complicity in the crime of unlawful pursuit of a regulated profession. Following the merging of the two sentences, the heaviest sentence of 6 months imprisonment was applied. The court also ordered the conditional suspension of the execution of the sentence applied to Pompiliu Bota for a probation period of 2 years and 6 months. The sentence given by the Deva Court was appealed by Pompiliu Bota on April 26, 2012, to the Alba Iulia Court of Appeal, but the appeal was rejected on May 29, 2012, so that the sentence of conviction of Pompiliu Bota by the Deva Court remained final. The action for annulment was also dismissed.

Bota and others will be tried in 2022 at the Suceava Court of Appeal for violating Art. 348 and Art. 367 of the Criminal Code; the injured parties (the plaintiffs who filed the complaint) number almost two hundred people. On 28 November 2023, the Suceava Court of Appeal annulled the acquittal of some "lawyers" from the Bota Bar (including Pompiliu Bota), terminated the criminal proceedings against them due to the limitation of criminal liability, the assets used for the illicit practice of law remain confiscated, the insurance seizure on certain assets and real estate was maintained, and they were obliged to pay some expenses related to the criminal investigation. The sentence is final (definitive). Pompiliu Bota filed a recourse in cassation, but that was also rejected by the HCCJ. In January 2025, the Constitutional Court rejected his complaint that the law about the bars of lawyers would be unconstitutional.

Florin Talpan, jurist of the Steaua București Army Sports Club (CSA Steaua), stated: "First of all, Bota is not a lawyer! He is a jurist, who has repeatedly violated the law, being sentenced to suspended imprisonment. He is a person of bad faith who evades the law all the time, making a point of it." Bota entered into a conflict with CSA Steaua by abusively registering their trademark with the European Union Intellectual Property Office.

Mr. Bota died in January 2026.

=== Criminal conviction of others ===
Two alleged lawyers from the Constitutional Bar have been definitively convicted either of illicitly practicing law as a lawyer or of threatening government officials during the investigation of the illegal practice of law (one of them went to jail and the other is or was wanted by the Romanian Police for being landed in jail). In fact, one of them was already excluded from the Bota Bar when he pretended to be a lawyer, so when the penal trial was being judged against the doubly false lawyer, the Bota Bar asked for damages from the doubly fake lawyer (asked 10 thousands RON as civil party to the trial); but since the Bota Bar was not recognized as a legally established bar association, the fake lawyer was not sentenced to pay damages to the Bota Bar. A Bucharest resident who was a member of the Bota Bar was also definitively sentenced to three years and six months in prison, among other things for violating Art. 348.

The Suceava Tribunal sentenced two people that were part of the Bota Bar to suspended sentences, but the decision is not final, being appealed. In the same decision, the Suceava Tribunal ordered the annihilation of many documents signed by several "lawyers", i.e. the annihilation of many invoices, but this will produce legal effects only if the decision remains final [annihilation=making them void]. The legal doctrine on the civil law effects of the annihilation of documents in criminal proceedings is unclear and controversial. The appeal has been judged, see above.

Another "lawyer" from the Bota Bar was definitively sentenced to a RON 7200 criminal fine in 2018 for practicing a regulated profession without having the right to do so. The head of UNBR Botomei, a former associate of Pompiliu Bota, was definitively sentenced to prison with immediate effect. Another fake lawyer from Constanța or Tulcea, belonging to the Bota Bar, was sentenced to prison. The appeal trial of this person was cancelled due to exceeding the statute of limitations (the trial has ended without declaring him either guilty or innocent). A pretended lawyer from Cluj was sentenced to 7200 RON penal fine for exercising the profession of lawyer without having the right to do so. He has to pay a total of 35 thousands RON penal fines. E.g. he got one sentence to pay a 9000 RON penal fine and 10000 RON damages to the real Cluj Bar Association. Another pretended lawyer received a postponed prison sentence. A woman pretending to be lawyer has been sentenced in Constanța. A fake lawyer from Tulcea was also sentenced. A fake lawyer from Cluj was saved by the statute of limitations.

Two sons of a Romanian (ex)judge are being prosecuted for illegal practice as lawyers. They had been illegally registered as members of the Madrid Bar Association, which apparently could not distinguish between fake and genuine credentials of being a Romanian lawyer. One of them was saved by the statute of limitations.

Four people are being tried for practicing law without having the right.

== Legal decisions on the Constitutional Bar ==
Currently, there are many decisions of the Constitutional Court of Romania or the European Court of Human Rights on the issue of the organization of the lawyer profession and bars in Romania as a result of the conflict between "classic bars" and "Bota bars", but the practice has long been non-uniform at the level of various courts.

=== Appeal in the interest of law ===
On September 21, 2015, the High Court of Cassation and Justice ruled in an recourse in the interest of the law (RIL) on the non-unitary practice regarding lawyers in alternative bars.

The minute reads as follows:

The act of a person exercising activities specific to the lawyer profession within entities that are not part of the forms of professional organization recognized by Law 51/1995 on the organization and exercise of the lawyer profession, republished, with subsequent amendments and completions, constitutes the felony of practicing without permission of a regulated profession provided by Art. 348 of the Criminal Code.

Since then, the practice of law by the "lawyers" of the Constitutional Bar has been a crime, without any doubt in this regard. This was confirmed by the Constitutional Court of Romania on 17 September 2019, citing, inter alia, the rejection as inadmissible of application 24.057/03 to the European Court of Human Rights. The Constitutional Court has stipulated again on 19 January 2021, decision no. 30, that bars alternative to the real UNBR are not allowed. Confirmed again in 2024.

=== Websites ===
The web domain www.bota.ro was deleted as a result of the Decision 2384/2019 of October 17, 2019 of the Bucharest Tribunal. Since February 2026 the website unbr.eu was rendered offline.

=== Trademark ===
The UNBR trademark registered by the Constitutional Bar was definitively annulled by the decision of the HCCJ. The deregistration or cancellation of the trademark is also confirmed by the Register of Trademarks kept by the Romanian State Office for Inventions and Trademarks (OSIM). UNBR Bota, led by Constantin Bălăcescu, filed an annulment appeal with the HCCJ, requesting, among other things, the recusal of the entire court (i.e. judicial panel). The annulment appeal is an extraordinary remedy and can only be exercised for a limited number of reasons specifically provided by law. On 3 May 2022, the annulment appeal was definitively rejected for failing to pay the required court fees (stamp duty). The Constitutional Court rejected the objection of unconstitutionality invoked by Bălăcescu and Bota regarding the UNBR Bota trademark; the European Court of Justice will not be consulted in this case.

On the OSIM Trademark Register, Pompiliu Bota appears with 11 trademarks: 10 rejected and one canceled. The UNBR trademarks registered by RODALL SRL have had varying degrees of success: some are still registered, some have been canceled, some have been rejected, and some are currently (as of February 2023) listed as "pending litigation". Although civil law would allow their use, in criminal law their use is a crime (punishable by imprisonment from 6 months to 3 years or a fine). Registering those trademarks is not a felony, but actually using them is.

=== Capacity to contract ===
The point of view of the Romanian Ministry of Justice is that UNBR Bota and INPPA Bota are not juridical entities: "The two entities do not have the capacity of use within the meaning of art. 205 para. (1) Civil Code, i.e. they cannot acquire rights and they cannot have obligations. They are not subjects of law." This view has been communicated to the courts for implementation. This has to do with their lack of juridical personhood, not with the mental state of their leaders: these two structures formally do not exist, so they cannot stand trial because they not exist. Speaking of civil law, organizations that do not exist cannot stand trial. Verbatim quote: "Correspondingly, the article 56 paragraph (2) of the Code for Civil Procedure expressly states that the two entities that are not established under the law cannot stand trial."

A paper in law science from 2010 concluded that UNBR Bota never existed. The reason is that only the lawgiver is entitled to establish a UNBR, while a court is not. According to lawyer Gheorghe Florea, the president of the real UNBR, the National Union of Romanian Bars, led by Constantin Bălăcescu, is "an entity without legal personality". Florea's point of view is enacted by the courts. Indeed, no such entity appears in the National Register of NGOs (data from 2 March 2020). Also confirmed for data from 26 May 2021 and for associations registered until 1 March 2016. According to the Romanian Ministry of Finance, UNBR-Bota did not register any declarations as economic agent after 22 April 2019 (data from 5 July 2024). The date of the last processing is 25 March 2021.

The National Union of Romanian Bars - Bota, with Fiscal Identification Code (CIF) 20626000, was declared a person without procedural capacity of use (capacity to contract). The decision was appealed by Pompiliu Bota and UNBR Bota. The lack of this capacity shows that the organization cannot be a party to civil law proceedings (cannot stand trial). In the context of the decision, this means that UNBR Bota cannot own or rent real estate and cannot pay or owe money to anyone — economically or financially this organization does not exist and has no money rights or obligations, property or rental. The appeal was reinstated, the Bucharest Municipal Tribunal requesting proof of the economic activities, income, property and bank accounts of UNBR Bota and Pompiliu Bota. Pompiliu Bota and the National Union of Romanian Bars (Bota Structure) requested public aid, but the court ruled: "Rejects the requests for public aid as unfounded." It is a matter of Bota and UNBR-Bota claiming that they cannot afford to pay a lawyer, and in general the costs of the proceedings (experts, executors, etc.), this is what public legal aid is all about. These conditions are "the average monthly net income per family member, in the last two months prior to the application, is below the level of 600 lei" for 50% compensation and below 300 lei, for 100% compensation [lei=RON]. The court either did not receive evidence that Bota and UNBR Bota met the legal requirements for granting them public aid, or considered that an "organization" without procedural capacity of use has no basis for receiving public aid, or considered that an "organization" clearly has no family members.

On 18 March 2022, the Bucharest Municipal Tribunal rejected the demand for reexamination of the public legal aid. On 21 April 2023, the Bucharest Municipal Tribunal ruled that the Bota Bar cannot stand trial. The verdict got attacked with recourse (still pending). And merely technically, the failure to recuse the judges can be appealed. On 5 September 2023, the Bucharest Court of Appeal decided: "Cancel the request for public judicial aid, for lack of signature. With the right of re-examination within 5 days of communication." The request for re-examination of the stamp duty was refused by the Bucharest Court of Appeal on 21 September 2023; the decision about stamp duty is final (definitive).

=== International recognition ===
In Italy, the lawyer's certificates as being registered in the Bota Bar were considered worthless scraps of paper, and the Italians who used them were not allowed to register in the Italian bars or were erased from the Italian bars due to lacking the title "lawyer". Each false certificate costs 7000 Euro, plus VAT, payable to the Bota Bar. After Viviana Onaca, from the Romanian Justice Department, officially notified the Order or Lawyers from Tivoli, Italy, that UNBR Bota does not exist (i.e. it is neither recognized nor legally established), UNBR Bota attacked her notification in court, but UNBR Bota definitively lost the trial. A genuine Italian lawyer who was found in conflict of interest with regard to representing the professional interests of Italian lawyers and to favoring UNBR Bota, was suspended for a year from practicing their profession.

=== Affair Bota vs. Romania ===
The European Court of Human Rights judged the Affair Bota vs. Romania. This is not about being a lawyer, but about a trial regarding unregistered cigarettes (a stamp had to be used in order to show that the cigarettes were legit).

=== Petitions to the EU Commission ===
Several petitions were addressed to the EU Commission. Those were answered in 2015.

=== International Criminal Court ===
Bota sent a request for judgment at the International Criminal Court, claiming the lawyers from the Bota Bar were and still are victims of genocide. There is no indication that the Office of the Prosecutor will accept to start an investigation.

== Botomei Bar ==
At one point there was UNBR-Botomei, which had split from UNBR-Bota, for which Vasile Botomei, who had been a colleague of crimes with Pompiliu Bota, was criminally convicted. Botomei was or is serving a "clandestine lawyer" prison sentence as a repeat offender. The judge who recruited clients for the Botomei Bar for a fee had to endure the rigors of the law, being definitively convicted and subsequently released from office by Romanian President Klaus Iohannis.

== The Independent Union of Romanian Jurists ==
The Independent Union of Romanian Jurists, led by Pompiliu Bota, is another clandestine lawyers structure. Bota's union has promoted nonsensical actions in court, in which it claims to consult (see) the act of establishment of the real UNBR. Or the real UNBR has no other act of establishment than the special law, published in the Official Gazette (Monitorul Oficial), the law can be consulted publicly by absolutely everyone. As such, the deed of establishment of the real UNBR cannot be the object of "law no. 544/2001 on free access to information of public interest" (Romanian FOIA law).

Pompiliu Bota also makes great efforts (but without much success) to obtain criminal prosecutions for some of his enemies, including two former associates of his:

- file 7129/2/2021 (3180/2021) Gheorghe Gheorghiu, former vice-president of the Association of Romanian Jurists (real)
- file 12741/4/2021 Ina Spînu (Racovita), vice-president of the Bota Bar
- file 306/57/2021 Cosmin Alin Roncioiu, dean of the Hunedoara Bar (real)
- file 8076/2/2021 (3721/2021) Ion Dragne, dean of the Bucharest Bar (real)
- file 46664/299/2021 Viorel Nimernicu, vice-president of the Bota Bar

This is after in the file 5397/303/2020 he tried to obtain the criminal prosecution of the real UNBR.
