= National Romanian Fascio =

Romanian fascist group

National Romanian Fascio Fascia Națională Română
- Abbreviation: FNR
- Founder: Démètre C. Pădeanu, Titus Panaitescu-Vifor, Gheorghe Băgulescu, Gheorghe Lungulescu, Valeriu Spătaru
- Founded: 22 December 1922; 103 years ago
- Merged into: National-Christian Defense League
- Newspaper: Fascismul
- Membership: 10,000+ (reported, 1924)
- Ideology: National Socialism; Fascism
- Colors: Black

The National Romanian Fascio (Romanian: Fascia Națională Română, FNR) was a fascist paramilitary organization active in the Kingdom of Romania for a short time period, between 1922 and 1929. Its members wore black shirts, and the organization was ideologically influenced both by Mussolini's National Fascist Party and by Hitler's NSDAP; it sought to adapt and implement these foreign fascist ideologies to Romania's specific circumstances.

== History ==
=== Beginnings: 1922-1923 ===
The National Romanian Fascio was founded by a committee including Démètre C. Pădeanu, Titus Panaitescu-Vifor, Gheorghe Băgulescu, Gheorghe Lungulescu, Valeriu Spătaru, V. Bazgan, and D. Rădulescu in December 1922. Some sources incorrectly claim that the grouping was initially known as Liga Națională (English: the National League), and later as Salvatorii Patriei (English: the Saviors of the Motherland), or that it was formed together with dissidents from the less-successful National Italo-Romanian Fascist Movement (MNFIR), which had been established in 1921 by journalist Elena Bacaloglu. However, according to historian Bronwyn Cragg, an attempt at merging the two groups came only later, and the group's other supposed names were only used as epithets in promotional materials.

The organization was founded nearly two months after the March on Rome carried out by the Italian fascists; the event was closely monitored by Romanian fascists, and Mussolini's rise to power strongly inspired them. Despite the clear inspiration it drew from Western European fascist regimes, the FNR was especially sensitive to accusations that it represented a foreign political import from Italy. At its founding, the FNR did not maintain any tangible relations with the Italian fascist regime, although Panaitescu-Vifor resided in Rome beginning in 1922. The majority of its early membership consisted of middle- and upper-class Romanians and members of the military. It classified itself as a monarchist organization which sought the eradication of foreign influence in Romania, and its political program was generally antisemitic, militarist, and monarchist in nature. The group also promoted the implementation of a numerus clausus, i.e. the limiting of Jewish students in Romanian instititions and universities, which had also been promoted by groups like A. C. Cuza's National-Christian Defense League. The FNR began to publish a newspaper, Fascismul (English: Fascism), in June 1923, and was promoted by newspapers including Lumina Satelor and Telegraful Român.

By 1923, the FNR had established throughout the entire country, but main areas of influence were Western Moldavia, Bukovina, and Banat, having its stronghold in the county of Caraș-Severin. In February 1923, its branch in Timișoara was raided by police, and Spătaru was arrested. Shortly thereafter, police also raided the group's Bucharest headquarters.

The group claimed to comprise 40,000 members in 1923, although contemporary sources disputed this number. Some police reports suggested that by December 1924 the organization had tens of thousands of members; one report estimated that in Cluj county, its membership already counted 2,000 members during the protests of the antisemitic students' movement of December 1922.

It maintained cordial relations with another nationalist organization inspired by Action Française, known as the Acțiunea Românească (English: Romanian Action), with which they held joint congresses, and by 1923 it had attracted the support of the periodical Opinia Publică (English: Public Opinion), published in Iași. Co-leader Panaitescu-Vifor, then working as a commercial attaché in Belgium, later attempted to establish relations with Charles Maurras of Action Française.

==== Structure, organization, social composition ====
The FNR had an overall quasi-military structure, modelled on that of the Roman army (similarly to the Italian fascists, it sought to emphasize Roman descent and Latinity) and organized hierarchically into squadrons, centuries, cohorts, legions, and groups of legions. It prized strict hierarchy and discipline, viewing the world as divided into "traitors" and adherents, and demanding total submission from the latter. The ideal fascist is described in article 22 of its statute as follows:

"The fascist must serve Romania and the Fasces with devotion, and with the firm conviction that he is serving a noble cause. His faith must be unwavering and full of strength of will. Indifferent to temptations, contemptuous of weaknesses and cowardice, ready for sacrifice, and fully aware of the weight of an apostolate, which he fulfills for the salvation of his country—this is how a fascist should be."

The FNR proposed a corporatist economic model in which workers would be organized into corporations rather than syndicates, similar to the system adopted by the Italian fascists.To demonstrate their commitment to ordinary Romanians, the fascists organized themselves into corporations of 25 members each, which were intended to "protect the interests of Romanian workers in their conflicts with employers and the authorities".

It was not primarily a workers' organization, and its social composition varied from city to city, with membership drawn predominantly from soldiers, functionaries, students, and railway workers. Its leadership, however, largely consisted of army officers, university professors, and journalists.

The FNR appears to have been particularly successful in attracting both soldiers and officers, whose distrust of democracy had been fuelled years earlier. A significant number of the organization's branches were led by former army officers. For instance, the Bukovina branch was headed by retired major Urșianu and a student, Tudose Popescu, who recruited former volunteers from the Italian Army during the Great War; the Banat branch was led by retired lieutenant colonel of the Austro-Hungarian Army, Valeriu Spătaru, who likewise recruited veterans; the Lugoj city section, part of the Banat branch, was led by retired captain Grigore Popescu; and the Galați county section was under the leadership of admiral Eustațiu Sebastian.

In the county of Iași, the FNR was led by university students, and most of its members were high-school students, totaling approximately 4,500. In the city of Târgu Ocna, a teacher named Henrietta Gabrilescu promoted the FNR's ideology in nearby villages; In the city of Orăștie both the LANC and the FNR were led by Ioan Moța (father of the future Iron Guard ideologue, Ion Moța), who promoted every and any nationalist organization in his newspaper Libertatea (English: The Liberty); and in the eastern counties of Covurlui, Tecuci, and Tutova, the most active cells were also located in villages rather than in the cities.

=== Conflict and decline (1923-1925) ===
In May 1923, General Artur Vătoianu reported that he had received threatening letters from members of the FNR. Later that year the prefect of Caraș-Severin, Petre Nemoianu, also fell victim to the FNR's threats, prompting increased attention on the group. However, by August 1923, the FNR leadership had split into two factions, each claiming to be the organization's sole representative. Pădeanu declared himself "dictator" and sole leader of the FNR in September 1923, prompting the group's newspaper, Fascismul (then under the editorship of Panaitescu-Vifor) to publicly excommunicate him. Some members claimed that one group had attempted a merger with Elena Bacaloglu's National Italo-Romanian Fascist Movement (MNFIR), which they had opposed. Pădeanu's group subsequently claimed that the side led by Panaitescu-Vifor had stolen the FNR's newspaper masthead and funds.

In October 1923, Pădeanu's group began to publish a separate newspaper, Fasciștii Constructivii (English: the Constructive Fascists), which openly attacked Panaitescu-Vifor's Fascismul. Shortly thereafter, members of the latter group staged an attack on the Jewish director of the newspaper Adevărul, Iacob Rosenthal, for publishing articles regarding the split which dishonoured Elena Bacaloglu. Both Bacaloglu's brother Sandy, Panaitescu-Vifor, Spătaru, and Lungulescu were subsequently arrested. At the same time, members of the Romanian military associated with the FNR, including general Gheorghe Băgulescu and colonel Ștefan Zăvoianu, were arrested for an alleged plot to overthrow the government. The former group was acquitted in June 1924, and Băgulescu's trial was thrown out following an intervention by Prince Carol (later King Carol II).

Unsure which side to support, many provincial branches hesitated, but most eventually abandoned the FNR and joined the increasingly popular National-Christian Defense League (LANC). In Cluj County, for example, membership had fallen to roughly 400 by 1924, suggesting that the majority had already defected to LANC. The FNR further fragmented into several smaller groups, which either disintegrated over time or attempted to revive the organization, as in the case of a FNR rump party that appears to have re-emerged in 1927 and continued to exist until 1929.

Due to conflicts between Bacaloglu and Panaitescu-Vifor, the merger with Bacaloglu's group was never fully realized. Some supporters of the FNR shifted their attention to the Romanian Action after 1924. A significant part of the FNR, along with the Romanian Action, merged into the LANC in 1925 under an agreement with Sandy Bacaloglu, apparently without the approval of Panaitescu-Vifor.

Panaitescu-Vifor's group continued to operate under the FNR name, moving the group to Cluj and publishing a new manifesto (Doctrina Fascismului Român (English: the Doctrine of Romanian Fascism)) in 1924. According to police reports, the group continued to have adherents in the Banat region and Bucharest, with smaller groups existing in Transylvania, but had fallen apart in Bukovina and Bessarabia. The group took on an increasingly antisemitic and xenophobic character, and proposed to expel foreigners and Jews from Romanian territory.

=== Final echoes: 1927-1929 ===
The FNR never achieved significant political influence. According to historians Armin Heinen and Bronwyn Cragg, its forces were weakened by ongoing internal power struggles and a lack of charismatic leadership. Researcher Roland Clark adds that a scandal involving the National Liberal Party and the Ion I. C. Brătianu cabinet also contributed to its collapse; in August 1923, three ministers from Brătianu's cabinet were found to have supported fascism, thus prompting attacks on the FNR by leaders from most of the major parties, ultimately collapsing under the pressure of discord and unpopularity.

By 1926, Panaitescu-Vifor, Băgulescu, and Spătaru remained active in the FNR, but the former lived abroad and was preoccupied by a diplomatic career and entrepreneurial ventures. The group shifted its focus to establishing a corporatist state in Romania, and to create a federation with nearby countries (Austria, Czechoslovakia, Hungary, Poland, Yugoslavia). The following year, Spătaru sought to establish relations with Hungarian officials, and advocated closer Romanian-Hungarian collaboration; by this point it appears that Panaitescu-Vifor had become inactive in the organization.

After the decline of the FNR, former members continued to be active in other fascist organizations. Panaitescu-Vifor established several press agencies and was appointed press councillor in Rome from 1940 onwards, developing close relationships with Octavian Goga, Nichifor Crainic, Ilie Rădulescu, Lucian Blaga, Vintilă Horia, Aron Cotruș, and other cultural figures of Romania's far-right. Gheorghe Băgulescu became associated with both LANC and Corneliu Zelea Codreanu's Legionary Movement, and served in diplomatic posts under the National Legionary State and under Ion Antonescu. Ștefan Zăvoianu became a member of the Legionary Movement, and was appointed police prefect of Bucharest by Horia Sima in 1940, participating in the Jilava massacre of 26 November 1940.

==== The "Fascist Plot" of 1929 ====
In April 1929, Colonel August Stoica (or Stoika), who at the time was in charge of another group using the FNR's name, tried to use FNR in his coup against government, variously described as an "operatic plot" or a "shambolic conspiracy". The conspirators were rounded up and made subject to a public trial, during which prosecution invoked the Mârzescu Law against fascist as well as communist sedition.
