= National Fascist Movement =

Romanian political movement

The National Fascist Movement (Romanian: Mișcarea Națională Fascistă, MNF) was a Romanian political movement formed in 1923 by the merger of the National Romanian Fascia and the National Italo-Romanian Cultural and Economic Movement.

With its roots in an avowedly pro-Italian group, the MNF also became close supporters of the Italian model of Fascism - although the movement also admired the methods of Action Française. The movement did not enjoy the success that it had hoped for, largely because of its attachment to foreign influences, and it was ultimately superseded by the Iron Guard, which offered a more domestic form of fascism.
