= Nestor Ignat =

Romanian journalist, writer and graphic artist

- Born: March 2, 1918; Iași, Kingdom of Romania
- Died: August 29, 2016 (aged 98); Bucharest, Romania
- Citizenship: Romanian
- Education: University of Bucharest
- Occupations: Journalist, writer, graphic artist
- Political party: Romanian Communist Party
- Spouse: Ana Barcan (actress)
- Children: Nestor Florin Ignat (b. 1942)
- Parents: Dimitrie Ignat (father); Lucia Ignat (née Filotti) (mother)

Nestor Ignat Filotti (2 March 1918 – 29 August 2016) was a Romanian journalist, writer and graphic artist. He was best known for his strong support for Marxist-Leninist ideology in culture.

== Journalist ==
Born in Iași in 1918, Ignat graduated from the Spiru Haret National College of Bucharest in 1936 and continued his studies at the University of Bucharest.

Nestor Ignat joined the Romanian Communist Party while it was still illegal. In 1944 he joined the staff of the Scînteia newspaper, where he was appointed editor.

Working with the chief editor Sorin Toma and deputy chief editor Silviu Brucan, Nestor Ignat wrote editorial attacking the non-communist political parties and vocally demanding the sentencing to death of their leaders. This part of his activity is often quoted as an example of an expression of the Stalinist ideological excesses and intolerance.

Ignat's journalistic activity focused mainly on the ideological aspects. A staunch supporter of proletcultism, he defended the ideological purity of the socialist society and exposed the "bourgeois" intellectuals. He also published articles in literary magazines where he exposed not only the writers which he considered as being "reactionary" but also communist critics who were insufficiently pugnacious. An example is his study on Lucian Blaga published in Viața Românească in which he wrote:

"Now when justice is under way for sentencing big and small criminals, it is our duty to denounce, to dispel all confusion, to tear off masks however well they might be composed, to through light into the darkness where fascism swarmed. We must eradicate evil, to extirpate it from every corner of the spirit. Those are the reasons for which we opened the "Blaga case", to enable all those who dreamed of an "aeonic" future, that the hour of reckoning has come and that nothing and nobody can escape from the crushing judgement of history."

A new wave of attacks started after student movements of 1956. A typical article of this period is a criticism of Anatol E. Baconsky, editor in chief of the magazine "Steaua" published by the Cluj section of the Writers' Union of Romania. This time Nestor Ignat disagrees with Baconsky's study of Mateiu Caragiale, accusing him of moving away from Marxism and from the "Leninist methods of revaluation of cultural heritage", of ignoring socialist realism and militant literature.

Ignat was one of the most zealous supporters of socialist realism; he was part of the first team of professors at the Faculty of Philosophy of the University of Bucharest, one of the most ideologized institutions of higher education in Romania at the time. Together with Sorin Toma, Ofelia Manole, Mihail Roller, Ștefan Voicu, Traian Șelmaru, Nicolae Moraru, Paul Niculescu-Mizil, he was part of the group of zealots in the immediate entourage of Leonte Răutu, then head of the Propaganda and Culture Department. Subsequently, Ignat was in charge of the theoretical journal of the Central Committee of Communist Party, Class Struggle. By the nature of the positions he held, he was directly involved in all the important ideological decisions of those times.

He held important functions in various professional organizations. He was chairman of the Union of Journalists and member of the National Council on the Romanian State Radio and Television Networks. He was also dean of the Faculty of Journalism of the University of Bucharest, giving up his position after the Romanian Revolution of 1989.

Though he remained close to the higher hierarchy of the Romanian Communist Party, he became less active after Gheorghe Gheorghiu-Dej's death in 1965. In 1974, at the 11th Congress of the Communist Party, he was not elected a member of the Central Committee, although he had been proposed by his County Organization. There were only two political figures whose candidacy was rejected by the Congress.

== Poet and writer ==
Ignat started writing poems while he was still in university, one of his first being "Magic" (Magie) published in 1939 in the "Jurnalul literar":Ignat started writing poems while he was still in university, one of his first being "Magic" (Magie) published in 1939 in the "Jurnalul literar":

Coloane negre cresc în jur solemne
Și rotitoarea boltă stă pe loc,
Apele fug în cercuri mari de foc,
E noaptea plină de ciudate semne.
...
Atunci răspund din mine stranii şoapte,
Înțepenite sferele m-ascultă,
În gând răsare clar cifra ocultă,
Mă simt crescând, mag uriaș în noapte.

Around me black columns are solemnly growing
And the rotating vault stays motionless
Waters are carried away in giant rings of fire
The night is full of strange occurrences
...
Then I start answering in strange whispers
The rigid spheres start listening
In my mind the occult number rises
And I feel that I am growing, as night's enormous wizard.

After his involvement in politics, Nestor Ignat published works attempting to present a Marxist-Leninist interpretation of Romanian writers. A first such volume analyzed the journalistic activity of Mihai Eminescu, emphasizing the poet's political views. His major volume "On the revaluation of the cultural heritage" is more comprehensive and covers the Marxist presentation of many Romanian contemporary writers.

"The Byzantinist mystic, the wild chauvinism, the glorification of the fascist "superman" and the exhortation of blind submission to the will of fascist leaders, the myth of blood and the worship of death, the idealization of patriarchal retardment and of the return to the Middle Ages – spread by traitors such as Nichifor Crainic, Radu Gyr, Aron Cotruș, Mircea Eliade and other representatives of hooliganism in literature – had precise and outspoken class related goals; their school raised the gangs of murderers of the Iron Guard."

Ignat continued his attacks previous against Lucian Blaga published in literary magazines:

For instance, Lucian Blaga's writings are a meeting point of all western decadent philosophical and literary trends. What could anybody find as being "good" or "positive" in Blaga's plays – an association of dark mysticism and Freudian pathological dramas – or in his misty poetry, full of morbid sensations, expressing the aspiration of immersion into nothingness, a poetry in which man is degraded to inferior levels, being transformed into a plant or a mineral? Blaga's entire work is an expression of putrid bourgeois ideology and foredoomed to perish at the same time with the class it has served.

While Ignat indicates the critical way in which Communist Party considered national cultural heritage, his book acidly characterizes various Romanian writers, without presenting an analysis or a justification of those views. However, after Joseph Stalin's death, Ignat did not publish any other books on similar topics.

His later works dealt with a presentation of Mexican Muralism or with impressions from his various travels and were devoid of political activism. He had shown concern for painting even before, having supported the activity of painters. Thus, he had written the presentation of painter George Ștefănescu for the latter's solo exhibition at the "Gheorghe Tattarescu Museum" in 1965.

After the Romanian Revolution of 1989, Ignat published o booklet with his poems, which a completely different worldview. As the poems were written at the same time when Ignat was an active supporter of Communist extremism, their publication does not reflect a change of mind after the collapse of the Communist regime.

In 1999 he published a Romanian translation of the originally in French written doctoral thesis of Alice Voinescu on neo-Kantianism and the Marburg school (Paris 1912). The same year, Ignat published some memoirs on Nae Ionescu, who had been one of his professors. The topic is unexpected for a journalist and indicates the variety of Nestor Ignat's areas of interest.

== Graphic artist ==
Nestor Ignat also had talent as graphic artist. The booklet with his poems, published in 1996, also included reproductions of some of Ignat's drawings. Other drawings were also selected as illustrations for a bibliophile reprint of Geo Bogza's "Offensive Poem"

In 2004, at age 86, Ignat had his first exhibition as a graphic artist at the "I.C. Petrescu" library in Bucharest. His 64 drawings are essentially expressionistic, but also reflect influences of other modern art movements such as constructivism, futurism, cubism or surrealism. His drawings entitled "Totalitarism", "Limbs", "War and Peace", "Sic transit gloria mundi", "End of a Century", "Jungle", "War", "At the Gates of Hell", "Big Bang", "Walpurgis Night", etc., present the terrifying contemporary hysteria and dementia, the desacralization of human existence, the bestialization of human beings. The drawings seen to reflect the artist's profound anxiety, the impossibility of finding an interior peace. Part of his drawings were presented at the "Sicardi Gallery" in Houston.

== Legacy ==
Contemporary historians investigating the history of Communism, mention Ignat as a journalist who was notorious in his rigid presentation of extreme Marxist-Leninist interpretation of the national culture, in purging the names of important Romanian writers for even minor non-conformist opinions, and for severely criticizing any other writer who dared be less intransigent. The influence of such views persisted long after the Stalin's death. Ignat's name is nearly always mentioned along with other political activists with whom he collaborated, such as Silviu Brucan. While it would be difficult to deny this ideological activity, which is clearly illustrated by his writings, Ignat's personality is significantly more complex.

Even after the relative thaw after the fall of Stalinism or after the collapse of the communist regimes in Eastern Europe, Ignat was unapologetic, never denying the opinions expressed in his writings, and never attempting to justify or to explain them.

Except for the period from 1945 to 1955, Ignat's publications show a completely different ideological picture. The poems published before 1944, such as "Magic" are impregnated with a mysticism similar with the one found in Blaga's works, which he later exposed as a sign of bourgeois decadence. His publications of the 1972–1980 period seem to avoid ideological involvement. His study of neo-Kantianism presents an idealistic philosophy opposed to materialism.

His drawings are influenced by the artistic avant-garde of the years between the two world wars and does not have the slightest connection with the socialist realism which he himself had supported as the only viable artistic expression.

These different approaches are however not the result of an evolution of Ignat's thinking. They seem to have coexisted. As opposed to other communist ideologists of the post-war era, to whom he is compared, Ignat did not try to rise in the political hierarchy of the Communist Party. While he did have important positions in the professional union of journalists and in the Faculty of Journalism, which both required an allegiance to the party, Ignat tried to limit his involvement strictly to journalism and avoided the party bureaucracy. The reasons why his candidacy for a membership in the party's central committee was rejected has never been investigated or explained by analysts. Ignat remains a controversial figure, still raising many unanswered questions.

He died in August 2016 at the age of 98.

== Works ==
- Nestor Ignat – Eminescu publicist – București, Editura pentru Literatură, 1950.
- Nestor Ignat – O carte despre frumusețea vieții noi – București, Editura pentru Literatură, 1950.
- Nestor Ignat – Cu privire la valorificarea moştenirii culturale – București, Editura de Stat pentru Literatură și Artã, 1954.
- Nestor Ignat – Pictori muraliști mexicani – București, Editura Meridiane, 1972.
- Nestor Ignat – Din albumul unui călător – București, Editura Sport Turism, 1980.
- Nestor Ignat – Poezii – București, Editura Bibliotecii Centrale Pedagogice, 1996.
- Alice Voinescu, Nestor Ignat – Kant și școala de la Marburg – București, Editura Eminescu, 1999.
