= Sebastian Bodu =

Romanian politician (born 1970)

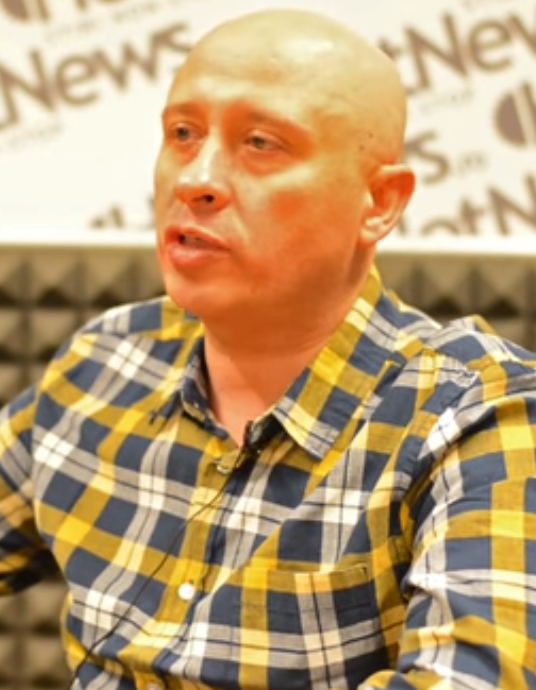
Sebastian Bodu

Sebastian Valentin Bodu (born 7 December 1970) is a Romanian politician and previous Member of the European Parliament. He was elected in 2007 and re-elected in 2009, being part of the European People's Party (EPP) group in the European Parliament. Bodu is a vice-chairman of the Committee on Legal Affairs and also a member of the delegation for relations with Canada.

Between 2005 and 2007, Sebastian Bodu was the president of ANAF. He is a member of the Democratic Liberal Party (PDL) since 2002. Bodu is a lawyer, being a member of the Bucharest Bar between 1996–1998 and 2007–2008.

== Professional career ==
Sebastian Bodu was born in 1970 in Constanța, Constanța County, Romania. He studied at the Faculty of Law at the University of Sibiu (1992–1996). In 1996, he graduated from the university with the licentiate in Law and with the average graduation mark: 9.71.

Since 1996, he has been a university professor, currently he teaches the Business Law course at the Faculty of Marketing at the Academy of Economic Studies (ASE) in Bucharest.

In 1996, he was admitted as a lawyer at the Bucharest Bar. Then, in 1996–1997, he works as an internal legal adviser at Financial Markets International Inc., the US consultancy corporation in the field of capital market, next, in 1997–1998, domestic legal adviser at Carana Group Inc., the US privatization consulting corporation (and, finally, between 1998 and 2004, as internal legal adviser for the Romanian-American Fund for Investments, a closed-end investment fund with American capital.

In 1999–2002, he did his PhD studies at the Law Department of the Academy of Economic Studies (ASE) in Bucharest and got his PhD in law with the thesis on: "The legal regime of the shares issued by commercial companies", the qualification got was very good. Then, in 2002–2004, he did Executive MBA studies at ASEBUSS Bucharest, a program of Kennesaw University of Atlanta, USA, graduated with a general average mark of 9.41.

He has published over 60 articles in prestigious law journals (being a member of the editorial board of the Romanian Journal of Business Law and then Director of the Society and Commercial Law Review). Sebastian Bodu is also author of the works: "Company Law - Dictionary of Legal Terms" (Rosetti Publishing House); "Commercial Law - University Course" (Rosetti Publishing House); Business Law (University Publishing House), Corporate Law Treaty - Volume I-III, ed.1 and 2 (Rosetti Publishing House), Commented Corporate Law (Rosetti Publishing House), Annotated Corporate Law (Rosetti Publishing House), The Law of Issuers of Financial Instruments, commented and annotated (Rosetti Publishing House).

During 2004–2005, he works as Director of the Legal Division and Compliance of ING group Romania. He is specialized in corporate law, commercial law, banking law, capital markets, privatization, civil law, financial law, commercial competition law.
