= Ovid Densusianu =

Romanian writer

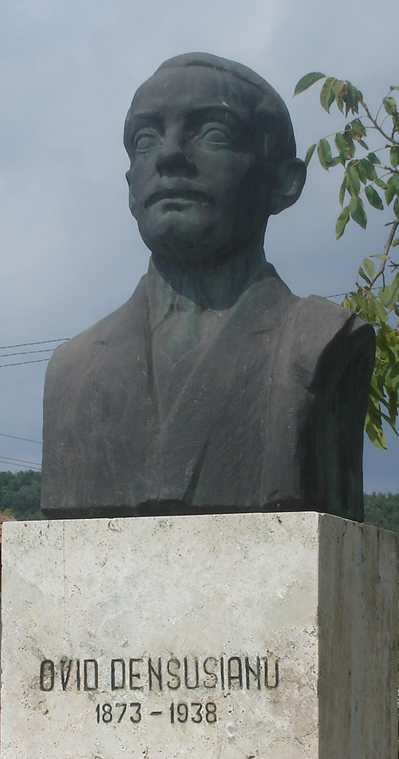
Bust of Densusianu in Densuș.

Ovid Densusianu (Romanian pronunciation: [oˈvid densuʃiˈanu]; also known under his pen name Ervin; 29 December 1873, Făgăraș – 9 June 1938, Bucharest) was a Romanian poet, philologist, linguist, folklorist, literary historian and critic, chief of a poetry school, university professor and journalist. He is known for introducing new trends of European modernism into Romanian literature.

== Biography ==
The son of Aron Densușianu, a university professor at the University of Iași, and Elena (b. Circa), he received a degree from the Faculty of Letters, University of Iași, in 1892. Between 1893 and 1895, he studied in Berlin, Germany, and Paris, France. After he received his diploma from the École pratique des hautes études, Paris, in 1896, he worked his way up at the University of Bucharest, eventually becoming a professor in 1901. In 1918, he became a full member of the Romanian Academy.

Densusianu was briefly married to Elena Bacaloglu, who later came to admire fascism and organized the National Italo-Romanian Cultural and Economic Movement. He is buried at Bellu Cemetery, in Bucharest.

Streets in Călan, Hațeg, Oradea, and Pitești are named after him. A county library in Deva and schools in Călan, Făgăraș, and Hațeg also bear his name.

== Writings (selection) ==
- La Prise de Cordres et de Sebille, Firmin Didot et cie, Paris, 1896. OCLC 760072
- Aymeri de Narbonne dans la chanson du pelerinage de Charlemagne, Paris, 1896. OCLC 919527087
- Istoria literaturii române, București, 1898.
- Un Essai de resurrection litteraire, E. Bouillon, Paris, 1899. OCLC 949262307
- Între două lumi, Institutul de Arte Grafice and Editură Minerva, București, 1899. OCLC 967949370
- Histoire de la langue roumaine, E. Leroux, Paris, 1901. OCLC 8256977
- Folclorul, cum trebuie înțeles, București, 1910; second edition, București, 1937
- Poezia nouă, București, 1911
- Limanuri albe, Editura Vieței Nouă, București, 1912. OCLC 81631020
- Păstoritul la popoarele romanice. Însemnătatea lui lingvistică și etnografică, București, 1913
- Ce nu se poate să învingă ..., Editura Vieața nouă, București, 1914. OCLC 897453663
- Graiul din Țara Hațegului, Socec, București, 1915. OCLC 908988288
- Originea păstorească a "Cântărei Cântărilor", Editura Vieața nouă, București, 1916. OCLC 577053865
- Heroica, București, 1918
- Sub stînca vremei, Editura Vieața nouă, București, 1911. OCLC 935579891
- Barbu Delavrancea, București, 1919
- Literatura română modernă, I–III, București, 1920–1933; re-edited by I. Șerb, București, 1985
- Salba clipelor, Editura Vieața nouă, București, 1921. OCLC 1079233111
- Dante și latinitatea, Ancora, București, 1921. OCLC 935427771
- Sufletul latin și literatura nouă, I–II, Editura Casei Școalelor, București, 1922. OCLC 895286597
- Vieața păstorească în poezia noastră populară, I–II, București, 1922–1923; second edition, București, 1943
- Raze peste lespezi, H. D'Arthez, Paris; Vieața Nouă, București, 1924. OCLC 65855309
- Evoluția estetică a limbii române, I–V, București, 1924–1938
- În zorile vieței, Socec, București, 1925. OCLC 7299863
- Florilège des chants populaires roumains, E. Droz, Paris, 1934. OCLC 21278037
- Flori alese din cântecele poporului. Viața păstorească în poezia noastră populară. Folclorul, cum trebuie înțeles. Graiul din Țara Hațegului, edited and foreword by Marin Bucur, Ed. pentru literatură, București, 1966. OCLC 252602086
- Opere, I–VI, edited by B. Cazacu, V. Rusu, and I. Șerb, București, 1968–1985
- Ideal și îndemnuri, edited and foreword by Călin Manilici, Cluj-Napoca, 1980
- Scrieri literare, București, 1998
