= Gheorghe Băgulescu =

Romanian general

Gheorghe Băgulescu (November 1, 1886 – November 26, 1963) was a Romanian brigadier general during World War II, writer and art collector. He served as Ambassador and Military Attaché to Japan from 1934 to 1939. From 1941 to 1943, he was Ambassador to Tokyo and Nanjing, China, as well as Military Attaché to Tokyo.

Băgulescu was born in Flămânda, a hamlet in Teleorman County. After having fought in World War I in a Vânători de munte unit as a captain, he was decorated in 1918 with the "Order of Michael the Brave" 3rd class, together with 14 other soldiers of the same unit.

In December 1922, he was among the co-founders of the fascist organization Fascia Națională Română.

He was appointed as military attaché of Romania to the Japanese Empire (1935–1939) and ambassador of Romania to Japan, Manchukuo, and China (1941–1943). In 1939, the Japanese Emperor awarded him the Order of the Sacred Treasure, 3rd class, after the publication of his book Japanese Soul.

After the war, he emigrated to southern France, and materially supported the Romanian National Committee and general Nicolae Rădescu. He died in Nice in 1963.

In 1973, the Romanian Ministry of Culture acquired a valuable collection of Japanese and Chinese art from general Gheorghe Băgulescu's estate for the Romanian National Art Museum.
