= National Italo-Romanian Cultural and Economic Movement =

Fascist movement of the 1920s

The National Italo-Romanian Cultural and Economic Movement (Romanian: Mișcarea Națională Culturală și Economică Italo-Română) or National Italo-Romanian Fascist Movement (Mișcarea Națională Fascistă Italo-Română) was a short-lived Fascist movement active in Romania during the early 1920s.

The movement was formed in 1921 by Elena Bacaloglu, a journalist who had an Italian husband at the time, and was an acquaintance of Benito Mussolini (she had been briefly the wife of Ovid Densusianu). The group deliberately mimicked Italian fascism and stressed the close ethnic bonds between the Italians and the Romanians. The group attracted only around 100 members. The group was based in Cluj, where it was initially established. It was wound up in 1923, when it merged with the National Romanian Fascia to form the National Fascist Movement.
