= Bucharest Bar =

- Formation: 30 September 1831
- Legal status: Legal entity of public interest
- Headquarters: no 3 Dr. Dumitru Râureanu Street, sector 5, Postal Code 050047
- Location: Bucharest, Romania
- Region served: Bucharest
- Members: lawyers in Bucharest
- Official language: Romanian
- Dean: Aurel Ciobanu
- Main organ: General Assembly
- Parent organization: U.N.B.R.
- Staff: 10,000+ active lawyers
- Website: www.baroul-bucuresti.ro

Bucharest Bar is the professional body of lawyers in the city of Bucharest, Romania. It is the largest bar in Romania, including 10,000+ active lawyers, representing almost half of the total number of lawyers across the country. Mainly, it is dedicated to serving their members, regulating the legal profession and organizing the mandatory legal assistance in its jurisdiction. In Romania, membership in bar associations is mandatory for practicing. The members of Bucharest Bar have general jurisdiction meaning that they are allowed to practice everywhere in Romania, but not only in Bucharest.

== History ==
Bucharest Bar was founded on 30 September 1831 and reorganized on 24 June 1865 following the adoption of the first law in Romania regulating the "body of lawyers" (December 1864), Bar Bucharest (Ilfov Bar, as originally called) was the nucleus around which the legal practice has been developed in Romania.

Throughout its history, the Bucharest Bar has undergone several stages of development:

- 1831-1865 were born the premises of legal practice in Romania;
- 1865-1921 period was the age of formation and affirmation, followed by its consolidation (between the two World Wars);
- of distress during the Communist Regime;
- Post-Romanian Revolution revival and European integration.

== Bucharest Bar Organization ==
=== General Assembly ===
- Consists of all lawyers (10,000+ active lawyers) practicing in the city of Bucharest.

=== Dean and Deputy Deans ===
Currently (term 2023-2027):

- Aurel Ciobanu (Dean)
- Ion Ilie-Iordachescu (Deputy Dean)
- Iosif Friedmann-Nicolescu (Deputy Dean)

=== Council of Bucharest Bar ===
Bucharest Bar is run by a Council composed of 17 members / counsels, led by the Dean and two Deputy Deans. Each counselor coordinates an area / resort activity. Council is elected for a period of 4 years. The current Council of Bucharest Bar is elected for the mandate 2023-2027.

== Masters of Bucharest Bar ==
- Aristide Pascal Constantin Bozianu, G. Vernescu, D. Gianni (in the earliest age of Bucharest Bar);
- Nicolae Titulescu, Take Ionescu, CG Dissescu, Toma Stelian, Sarmiza Bilcescu-Alimanisteanu, the first female lawyer in Europe and the first woman Phd in Law in the world. (at the end of the nineteenth century and early twentieth century);
- Micescu N. Istrate, "The Prince of Romanian lawyers", Dem. I. Dobrescu, Radu D. Rosetti, Petre Pandrea, (in the interbelic "golden age");
- Paul Vlahide, Nicolae Cerveni, Victor Anagnoste (in last quarter of the last century).

== Affiliations ==
Bucharest Bar is connected to the following European legal bodies:

- collective member of the Union Internationale des Avocat ( U.I.A.) since 1927 (www.uianet.org);
- collective member of the International Bar Association since 1992 (www.ibanet.org);
- founding collective member of the Black Sea Countries Bars Association (B.C.B.A.) since 1994; the B.C.B.A. joined the U.I.A. as an associated member in 1998 and it currently includes 15 bar associations of 8 countries in the Black Sea region: Romania, Bulgaria, Macedonia, Turkey, Republic of Moldova, Georgia, Azerbaijan and Albania.

The Bucharest Bar has been developing close cooperation with all the European bar associations as well as with other bar associations worldwide. It also develops cooperation with the American Bar Association.
