= Aron Cotruș =

Romanian poet and diplomat (1891-1961)

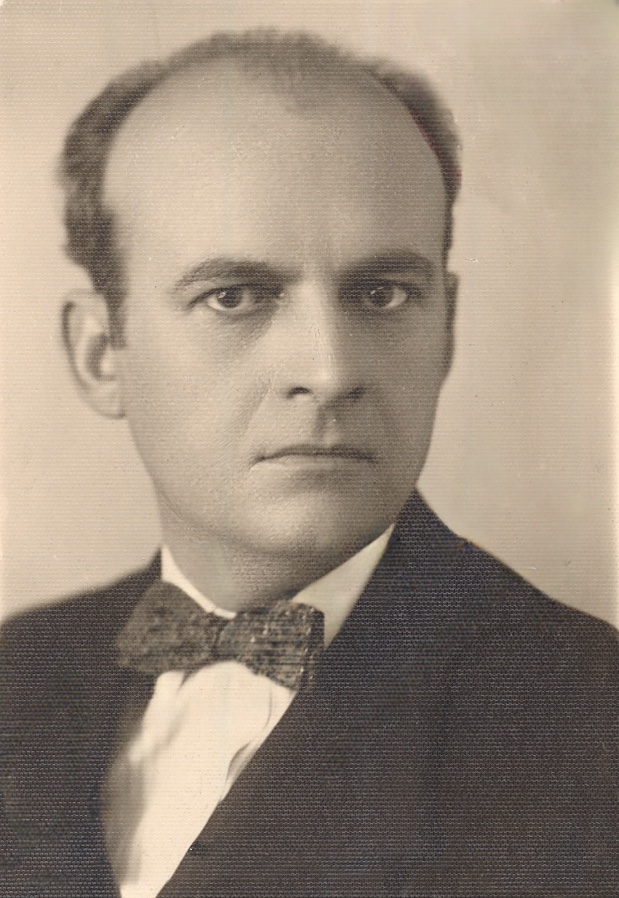
Aron Cotruș, signed photograph

Aron Cotruș (Romanian pronunciation: [aˈron koˈtruʃ]; 2 January 1891 – 1 November 1961) was a Romanian poet, diplomat, and member of the fascist Iron Guard.

== Life ==
He was born in 1891 in Hașag, Sibiu County, at the time in Austria-Hungary. After attending secondary school in Blaj and the Andrei Șaguna High School in Brașov, he pursued his studies at the Faculty of Letters of the University of Vienna. He became affiliated with the nationalist newspapers ""Românul" from Arad and "Gazeta de Transilvania" from Brașov. He also collaborated with the cultural magazines "Gândirea", "Vremea", "Libertatea" (Orăștie), "Iconar" (Cernăuți), among others. The critic Al. T. Stamatiad described Cotruș as young Transylvania's "most talented poet".

During World War I he was in Italy, where he worked under the Romanian Legation in Rome. After the war, in 1919, he returned to Romania, becoming a journalist in Arad. A royalist, he later became a supporter of Ion Antonescu. After the death of Queen Marie of Romania he wrote the important poem "Maria Doamna" ("Lady Marie"), in which, in the words of historian Lucian Boia, "the queen appears as a providential figure come from far-off shores to infuse the Romanian nation with a new force."

Cotruș also became a member of the Romanian Writers' Society. He worked as a press attaché in Rome and Warsaw, and during World War II as a press secretary in Madrid and Lisbon. Along with Titus Vifor and Vintilă Horia he was assigned by the Iron Guard's National Legionary State to run the Romanian Propaganda Office in Rome, "The Fellowship of the Cross".

After the coup d'état of August 1944 and the collapse of the Antonescu regime, he became a political refugee in Francoist Spain. He became the president of the exiled Romanian community, then editor of the Iron Guard exile magazine "Carpații", published in Madrid. In 1957 he settled in the United States in Long Beach, California, where he lived for the rest of his life. He died in La Mirada, California on November 1, 1961. His remains are in Holy Cross Cemetery, Cleveland, under a simple stone plaque.

A street in Bucharest's Sector 1 is named after him.

== Literature ==
The Princeton Encyclopedia of Poetry describes him as a writer "whose messianic thunderings were couched in rolling free verse and a racy, sonorous vocabulary." Along with Emil Isac, he opposed a neo-romantic and "prophetic" attitude borrowed from Octavian Goga. In Cotruș's case, this took the form of an ethno-nationalist discourse about "the ethnic and social battles of the Romanians".

Under the communist regime, Cotruș was identified as a traitor, and as a representative of what Marxist critic Nestor Ignat called "hooliganism in literature". However, during the late Ceaușescu era, portions of his work were republished in Romania and his image was partially rehabilitated.

== Publications ==
- "Poezii" ("Poems"). Orăștie, 1911
- "Sărbătoarea morții" ("Festival of Death"). Concordia, Arad, 1915. Edition II Bucharest, 1922
- "Neguri albe". ("White Clouds"). Alba-Iulia, 1920
- "România" ("Romania") (poem). Brașov, 1920. Edition II Arad, 1922
- "Versuri". ("Lyrics"). Library "Sămănatorul", Arad, 1925
- "In robia lor" ("In their bondage"). Arad, 1926
- "Mâine". ("Tomorrow"). Editura Scrisul Românesc, Craiova, 1928. A second edition under the auspices of the "Societății de Mâine" ("Society of Tomorrow"), Cluj, 1928
- "Holnap" (Tomorrow), Hungarian, published in Arad, 1929. Translated by Pal Bado
- "Strigăt pentru depărtări" ("Cry for the departed"). Editura Ienci, Timișoara, 1927
- "Printre oameni în mers". ("Some people walk"). Sosnowiec, Poland, 1933 (bibliographical rarity). Second edition of the Spanish translation of Gaetano Aparicio, Madrid 1945
- "Horia". Issue Get Warsaw, Poland, 1935. Edition II Brad 1936 (in just two years appear editions of volume 18. Only in appearing in Bucharest, during 1938: editions III, IV, V, VI). The Hungarian translation by A. Kibedi, Cluj, 1938
- "Versek" (book of poems in Hungarian). Cluj, in 1935 (many of the poet's verses were published in the Transylvanian Saxon magazine "Klingsor" in Brașov, some translated by Alfred Margul-Sperber. Similarly, Zoltan Franyo translated some poems in German publishing them in magazines literature for the German community in Romania)
- "Culegere de versuri" ("Collection of poems"). Polish translation by Wladimir Lewice. Lvov, 1936
- "Țara" ("Country"). Bucharest, 1937. Edition II Lisbon, 1940
- "Miners", Bucharest, 1937
- "Peste prăpăstii de potrivnicie" ("Over the precipice of misfortune"), Bucharest, 1938. Edition II Aparicio Gaetano Spanish translation, Madrid 1941
- "Maria Doamna" ("Lady Marie") (poem). Typography "Star", Bucharest, 1938 (deluxe edition)
- "Aron Cotruș: Lady Marie". Reviews published in literary magazines in the country at that time, collected and published as a homage to the poet, Bucharest, 1939
- "Rapsodie Valahă" ("Wallachian Rhapsody"). Madrid, 1940. Edition II Bucharest: "Star", 1941. Edition III of Madrid, Editura Carpații, 1954. Appeared in Spanish translation, Madrid, 1941 (Aparicio Gaetano's translation)
- "Rapsodie Dacă" ("Dacian Rhapsody"). Editura Fundațiile Regale, Bucharest, 1942
- "Poema de Montserrat" (in "Escorial"), Spain, 1949; Second edition of Madrid, 1951
- "Poemas". Madrid 1951
- "Roads by storm." Madrid 1951
- "Canto Ramon Llull." Mallorca, Spain, 1952
- Rapsodia Iberică [Rhapsody Iberian], Madrid: Editura Carpații, 1954, OCLC 7295357
- Între Volga și'ntre Mississippi [Between the Volga and the Mississippi], Madrid: Editura Carpații, 1956, OCLC 14914878
- "Aron Cotruș – Complete Works". Editura Dacia, Madrid, 1978 (edited by Nicolae Roșca)
