= 1911 Romanian general election =

← 1907	March 1, 1911	1912 →

All 112 eligible seats in the Senate All 183 seats in the Chamber of Deputies
- Turnout: 72.6%
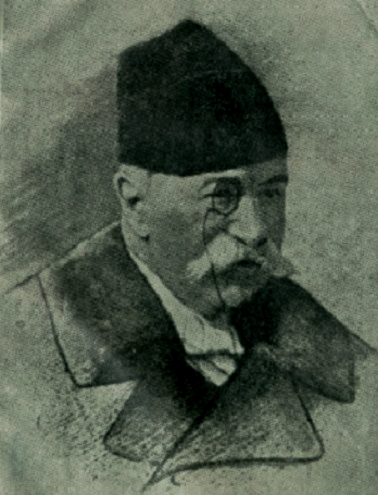

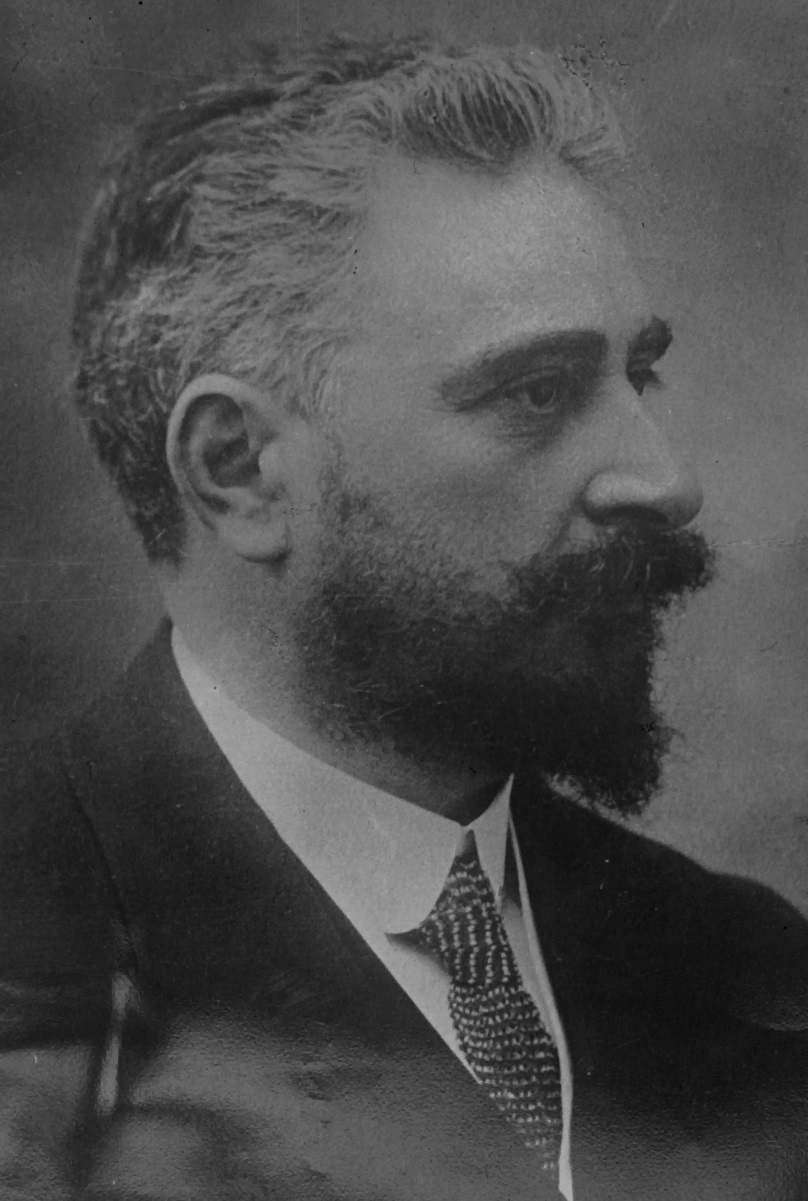
	First party	Second party
Leader	Petre P. Carp	Ion I. C. Brătianu
Party	Conservative Party (Romania, 1880–1918)	PNL / PCD
Leader since	1907	1909
Last election	17 S / 15 D	95 S / 166 D
Seats won	85 S / 160 D	27 S / 20 D
Seat change	▲70 S / ▲145 D	▼68 S / ▼146 D
Popular vote	133,287	81,139
Percentage	61.4	37.8

General elections were held in the Kingdom of Romania from March 1 to March 14, 1911, confirming a majority for the Conservative Party (PC) under Petre P. Carp. The united opposition was constituted of the National Liberal (PNL) and Conservative-Democratic (PCD) parties, with Ion I. C. Brătianu and Take Ionescu as the leaders. The PCD, founded in 1908 from a middle-class Conservative splinter group, was making its first appearance nationally. A quickly rising third-party, its alliance with the PNL helped the latter survive and consolidate. The elections were also contested by two other new political actors: the right-wing Democratic Nationalist Party, and the left-wing Social Democratic Party. Both failed to win any seats.

The elections were held under census suffrage with all-male electors—although both the smaller parties and a left-wing faction of the PNL had begun pressing for universal male suffrage. The PC countered these demands, and the PNL's expected return to power, by running on a platform of sweeping social and economic reforms, including support for labor rights. The campaign and ballot count were touched by controversy, with Minister of the Interior Alexandru Marghiloman being widely accused of intimidation and fraud.

The Conservatives' surprisingly large win was counterbalanced by their inner factionalism, with major disputes taking place before, during, and after the campaign. Once reconfirmed, Prime Minister Carp was repeatedly pressured by King Carol I into resuming talks with the PCD, in order to achieve stability and secure popular backing. That project was hampered by Carp's refusal to compromise over larger issues of policy, and more particularly by scandals such as the "Tramcar Affair", which helped solidify the opposition to Carp. Carp resigned in early 1912, and the king appointed Titu Maiorescu to lead a new Conservative cabinet, which sealed a deal with the PCD and held new elections in November.

== Context ==
Following the 1907 election, Romania had been under a PNL administration, with Ion I. C. Brătianu as Prime Minister. The cabinet had been formed shortly after the large-scale peasants' revolt, and saw the Conservatives and the National Liberals entangled in a debate about land reform. Carp, as the PC doctrinaire, was against giving land and voting rights to the peasants, and favored tax cut for activities of self-improvement. The negotiations, also involving landowner advocate Ioan Lahovary on the Conservative side, stalled. Under Carp, the Conservatives blocked out their democratizing wing, by expelling Take Ionescu from the party in January 1908. This clash led to the creation of the PCD, as Ionescu's own party. The new group rose rapidly on the political scene, earning pledges from an intellectual and political class that included Alexandru and Nicolae Xenopol, Ion Luca Caragiale, Ovid Densusianu, and Constantin Rădulescu-Motru.

The PCD had a good electoral record, having won 9 of 18 by-elections held from 1907 to 1911—the PNL had 8 such victories, and the PC only one. Ionescu's rise worried Carp and his supporters. Carp reportedly authorized his right-hand man, Alexandru Marghiloman, to use any means necessary in preventing the PCD from winning more electoral advantages. At the time, Carp counted not on electoral gains, but on the graces of King Carol I. He explained to his followers that it was enough for the monarch to appoint him prime minister, and "the number [of electors] would follow suit."

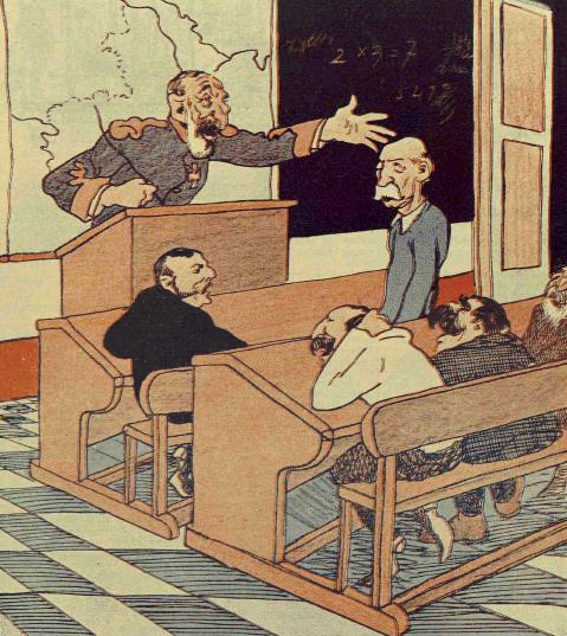
Cartoon by Ion Theodorescu-Sion, in Furnica, June 1910. Petre P. Carp as the opinionated student of King Carol I, expressing his wish to come to power "by way of the Palace". Alexandru Marghiloman to his left, shushing the PCD back-benchers (Take Ionescu, Alexandru Bădărău, Nicolae Fleva).

The immediate cause of the 1911 election was a prolonged campaign against Brătianu, accused by the Conservatives of running a spoils system. These accusations were backed by the Conservative-Democrats, who expected that King Carol would call upon them, the third force, to form government. On December 22, Brătianu announced his cabinet's resignation to Parliament, despite criticism from his own ranks; he thus forfeited his chance of organizing recall elections on his terms. Brătianu reassured his constituents that he felt confident the PNL would win under any scenario. As he put it at the time, the withdrawal was one of both moral high ground and electoral tactics: "we decided that, as higher politics dictate, we would retire in such manner as to make our adversaries witness [it] not just with a feeling of respect, but also with fear. Others may hold government, but power belongs to us still."

Also in December, the king appointed Carp to form a Conservative cabinet, bypassing the PCD altogether. He insisted, however, that Carp would not overturn the PNL's agrarian legislation, and (less categorically) that Carp and Ionescu begin reconciliation talks. The controversial appointment pushed the PCD into an alliance with the PNL. However, it may have been intended by Carol as a subtle attack on Carp: although he favored the PC, he felt that Carp was arrogant and incapable of forging a governing coalition. He may also have believed that Carp would lose his own elections. Nevertheless, the new administration reflected an understanding between the various factions of the party. Carp represented the Junimea club, as did his ministers Marghiloman, Constantin C. Arion and Titu Maiorescu. Mihail G. Cantacuzino and Dimitrie S. Nenițescu were followers of the aristocrat Gheorghe Grigore Cantacuzino, while Nicolae Filipescu and Barbu Ștefănescu Delavrancea stood for the PC's national-conservative pole. Lahovary, the Minister of Agriculture, represented traditional conservatism.

== Campaign ==
Brătianu and the PCD's Take Ionescu sealed a pact to form the united opposition. This tactic was highly advantageous to the then-waning PNL: Ionescu agreed to allow the National Liberals an equal share of the eligible positions, including in areas that voted all-PCD. Immediately after being appointed, Carp visited Brătianu and Ionescu. He promised not to overuse his power to influence the election, allowing the PNL and PCD together a total of 55 parliamentary seats, 35 of them in Chamber (from 295 and 183 respectively). Both of his opponents refused.

While striking a deal with the PCD, the PNL leadership was challenged by the party's own democratizing wing, unsatisfied with the pace of post-1907 reforms. Coalesced around by Spiru Haret, it comprised agrarian "Poporanists" and former socialists such as the anthropologist George Diamandy. The latter produced timid calls for the introduction of universal (male) suffrage, and openly proposed a merger with the PCD. Brătianu was able to reassert control over this tendency, for instance by not putting Diamandy up for reelection in Chamber.

To this background, radical-right forces, having established in 1910 the Democratic Nationalist Party (PND), also began "strong electoral agitation." They also demanded the extension of electoral rights, but wanted these limited to ethnic Romanian males. Led by academics Nicolae Iorga and A. C. Cuza, this group negotiated an alliance with the PC, but later denounced it. Their campaign was touched by significant controversy: Cuza was allegedly prevented by the authorities from running in Prahova, then in Dorohoi, "with maneuvers unbecoming of a decent administration." He eventually ran alongside Ion Zelea Codreanu in Baia County, where their electoral agents included the athlete-spy and future assassin Ilie Cătărău, whose impressive size struck fear in the electorate.

Just shortly before the election, Carp had caused public uproar by challenging some of the core tenets of radical Romanian nationalism, outlining his respect for Austria-Hungary, and his overall sympathy for the Jewish Romanian community. On the left, the Social Democratic Party (PSDR) was consolidating in and around Galați, after having been repressed by a PNL administration. Its absentee leader was the Bulgarian-born Christian Rakovsky, who only obtained his citizenship rights under the new laws of the Carp government.

The PC reached out to a non-conservative electorate by adopting a reformist program with attractive promises: tax cuts for small and medium rural property, to favor peasants; and the introduction of guilds, workers' compensation, and social insurance, to address issues of labor. These were denounced by the PNL–PCD as demagoguery, but agreed upon by most Conservative leaders—with the notable exception of Lahovary, who found them unpalatable. Their impact on the public was first tested during a set of local elections, which the PC won easily at Giurgiu and more narrowly at Constanța and Sulina.

== Results ==
The general elections were convened for March 1 [O.S. February 16] 1911, and were carried out in four stages, to March 14 [February 24]. Overall, 91,678 of 126,912 registered voters, or 72.6%, cast their vote. The turnout was highest in the upper-class 1st College of Chamber, where 78.4% of the total 15,298 voters showed up. The Conservatives received 133,287 votes, or 61.4% of the general total. The remainder 81,139 votes, or 37.8%, went to the PNL–PCD camp, and 2,486 votes were invalidated. During the first stage of voting, Conservatives secured 82 parliamentary seats in the 1st and 2nd Colleges for Chamber, with the PNL and PCD only managing 18 between them. Chairman Brătianu failed to win a Chamber seat for Botoșani County, and the PCD's Constantin Dissescu lost at Olt, although Ion G. Duca was elected for Vâlcea. Support for government peaked in the 3rd (and last) Electoral College of Chamber, representing the lower-middle class, where it had 77.6% of the ballots (39,633 of 51,048) and 38 of 40 possible seats.

In the race for the 1st Senatorial College, the first round of voting gave Carp only 52% of votes (8,209 of 15,811), and 60 seats in the first round in the 1st College; the PNL–PCD alliance secured 18. In Vâlcea, Conservative I. G. Cantacuzino, on his last electoral appearance, lost to Dissescu. The two senatorial seats for the universities were evenly split: Thoma Ionescu, a PCD man, won at Bucharest, the PC's Nicolae A. Bogdan at Iași. However, the 2nd (last) Senatorial College produced a sweeping victory. In that subgroup, 22 mandates went to the Conservatives, with the opposition only electing 4 men: Brătianu, Haret, Alexandru Bădărău, Mihail Pherekyde. 32 seats were decided during ballotage—15 for Senate, 16 for Chamber. In the end, the Conservatives had 160 deputies, while the PNL and the PCD each had 10; there were 85 Conservative senators to 16 and 11, respectively. This was a major reversal from the 1907 legislature, in which the PNL had had 166 deputies, 95 senators, while the PC had had 15 deputies, 17 senators.

A major political battle took place in Ilfov County, which encompassed the capital Bucharest and included some of the parties' top contenders. This individual unit sent the highest number of parliamentarians: 7 senators (5 in the 2nd College); 16 deputies (9 in the 2nd, 2 in the 3rd Colleges). For Chamber, the united opposition list was headlined by Take Ionescu, Pherekyde, Haret, Constantin Nacu and Nicolae Fleva, and also included Constantin Banu, Jean Th. Florescu, Constantin Istrati, Basile M. Missir, and Dimitrie P. Moruzi. They lost to a government list that included, among others, Maiorescu, Marghiloman, Filipescu, Virgil Arion, Constantin Bacalbașa, Alexandru Cărcăleteanu, Nicolae Lahovary, Emanoil Miclescu, Alexandru Obregia, Theodor Rosetti, and Sabba Ștefănescu—all of whom were elected.

No other parties won seats in the race, although two deputy seats were won by independents. On the left, PSDR also put up a Bucharest candidate, Christian Rakovsky, who managed 320 votes, and was also presented, also unsuccessfully, as a candidate in Galați. PND put up candidates in several counties. In one notable incident at Gorj, its candidate withdrew from the race to make way for the nationalist Conservative Barbu Ștefănescu Delavrancea. In Ilfov, PND leader Iorga only received 386 votes running for the 2nd Chamber College. This placed him between two former party colleagues, who ran as independents (Vasile Kogălniceanu, with 552 votes, and Petre Liciu, with 218), and above the humorist George Ranetti (326 votes). Iorga also ran unsuccessfully in six other precincts. PND partisans attributed this poor showing to the systemic failures of the census suffrage, which the party, like the left-leaning Liberal factions, sought to amend.

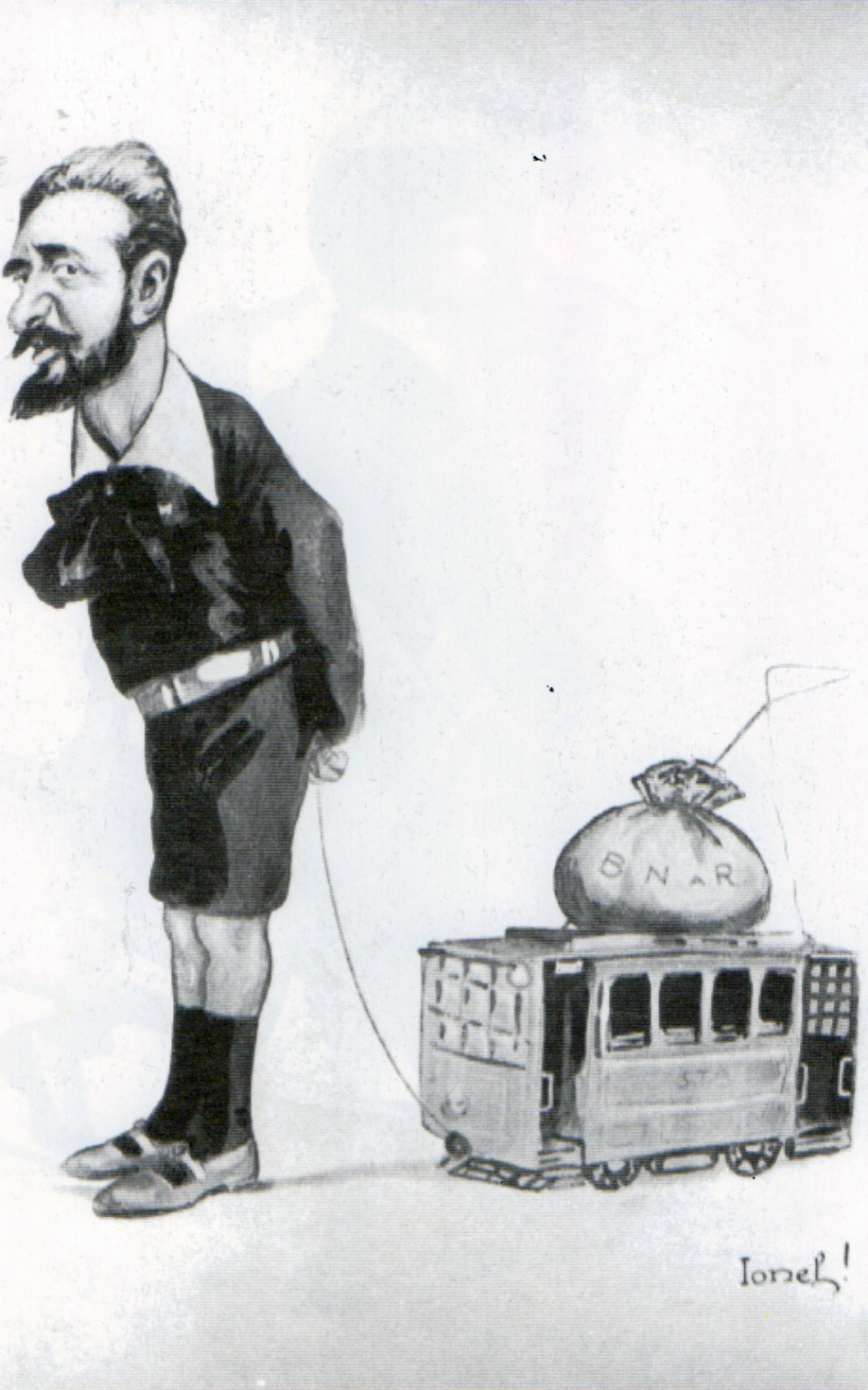
Ion I. C. Brătianu in child's clothes, dragging about a tramcar as his toy. 1913 cartoon by Nicolae Petrescu Găină.

As noted years later by candidate Bacalbașa, Carp's team "put their faith in the administrative machine, on one hand, and, on the other, on [having a] popular platform." Bacalbașa reserves praise for Marghiloman, who, as Minister of the Interior, "proved himself a strong organizer and an extraordinary elector." He also claims that the resulting Chamber was "clean and independent", "dominated by a democratic current." Other sources are more blunt in attributing Carp's win to electoral fraud. As noted by cultural historian Z. Ornea: "Marghiloman sensed the danger [...] and ran the elections in an indescribable manner. Contemporaries recount that people were simply terrified." The PCD press described the voting count as "the least dignified" in Romania's history, while the PC's newspapers accused the united opposition of buying its votes.

== Aftermath ==
After also securing the elections of G. G. Cantacuzino as Head Senator and Constantin Olănescu as Chamber President, Carp was in near-complete control of Romanian politics. The opposition abstained during the subsequent election for Bucharest Council, leaving only the Conservative factions to compete, informally, for the appointment of a mayor. Matache Dobrescu, a favorite of Carp's, took that position, defeating Filipescu protégé Mihail "Mișu" Deșliu. Similar disputes over offices soon led the Conservatives to lose support from parliamentarians such as Ion C. Grădișteanu and Ermil Pangrati, who, either formally or informally, went to the united opposition. The anti-Carp Conservative Gheorghe Manu, who took a Chamber seat in Teleorman County, boycotted parliamentary proceedings until his death on May 16.

The Carp administration was soon hindered by political scandals such as the Gherasim Safirin affair, but alternating with displays of diplomatic success, as with the celebrated visit to Bucharest of Count Nogi. By August, the newspaper headlines were about the "Tramcar Affair", an issue first brought up by Marghiloman and Dobrescu. Government voted to dissolve the Bucharest Tramcar Society on suspicion that it functioned as part of the PNL political machine. When international experts found the Society to have been legally operating, the PNL and PCD instigated massive demonstrations against Carp.

Meanwhile, with the start of an international emergency (the Tripolitanian Crisis), the king hoped to obtain a stable government by making the PCD a partner in government, and negotiations to this effect began between Carp and Ionescu. These broke down when Ionescu asked for new elections that fall. In December, citing as their reason the government's obstinacy in the Tramcar Affair, 53 senators and deputies of both opposition parties resigned, including Brătianu. This time brought the Conservatives and the PSDR into an informal alliance, with counter-demonstrations being staged by both parties together. The government fulfilled its promise to the workers, and passed a social package—making Romania the fourth European country to introduce compulsory insurance, and creating a network of public healthcare facilities.

In March 1912, the Tramcar Affair reached its climax. Following an unfavorable verdict at the High Court and PNL-instigated riots in Bucharest, Carp handed in his resignation. The king took the decision to install another Conservative team, with Maiorescu taking over as prime minister. The new cabinet resumed talks with the PCD, spurred on by the need for stability in the context of the First Balkan War—these produced a PC–PCD cabinet, also headed by Maiorescu, which announced elections in late 1912. These two defeats would cause a definitive end to the 50-year-long friendship between Carp and Maiorescu, and lead to the former's marginalization within the PC.
