= Democratic Nationalist Party (Romania) =

Democratic Nationalist Party Partidul Naționalist-Democrat
- President: Nicolae Iorga/A. C. Cuza (first); Petre Topa (last)
- Founded: May 6 [O.S. April 23] 1910
- Dissolved: 1946; 80 years ago
- Split from: Conservative Party
- Merged into: National Liberal Party–Tătărescu
- Newspaper: Neamul Românesc; Răvașul Naționalist-Democrat
- Ideology: Producerism; Economic antisemitism; Corporatism; Anti-communism; Right-wing populism
- National affiliation: Parliamentary Bloc (1919); Federation of National Social Democracy (1920); Democratic Bloc (1920); National Union (1931); National-Democratic Coalition (1944)
- Colours: Black

Party flag

The Democratic Nationalist Party or Nationalist Democratic Party (Romanian: Partidul Naționalist-Democrat, PND) was a political party in Romania, established by historian Nicolae Iorga (who was also its longest-serving leader) and jurist A. C. Cuza. Its support base was in the lower reaches of the Romanian middle class, and, especially through Cuza's ideology, it reflected the xenophobia, economic antisemitism, and producerism of that particular environment. The PND was a weak challenge to the mainstream political forces, either conservative or liberal, failing in its bid to become Romania's third-strongest party. By 1916, it was effectively split between Iorga's moderates and Cuza's radicals, suspending its activity for the remainder of World War I.

The PND reemerged as a significant force in Greater Romania, after November 1918. It frequently changed names and refined its official stance, becoming closely aligned with Iorga's evolving ideas on society and politics. During the early 1920s, it trailed to the left of the political spectrum, caucusing with the Peasants' Party, and supporting a "Democratic Bloc" coalition against the National Liberals; its far-right faction seceded and became the National-Christian Defense League. Around 1925, the PND itself returned to national conservatism, briefly merging with the Romanian National Party, but resuming independence in 1926, when the latter merged into the National Peasants' Party. It reemerged with an agenda supporting technocracy and corporatism, and was brought to power in 1931, when King Carol II appointed Iorga as Prime Minister.

The PND and its allies attempted to tackle the Great Depression in Romania with controversial measures such as debt relief, and the government was voted out of office in the 1932 elections. Iorga's version of middle-class nationalism faded into political insignificance with the advent of fascist movements, in particular the Iron Guard; his own growing support for authoritarianism led him to dissolve the PND in 1938, when he and other cadres joined Carol's National Renaissance Front. He participated in the clampdown against the Iron Guard, which led to his killing in 1940.

The PND was revived clandestinely during World War II, with Petre Topa at its helm. In this final part of its existence, it joined up with liberal and socialist forces in opposing the Ion Antonescu dictatorship. It supported the coup of August 1944, and afterward enjoyed a brief existence as a legal party, before merging into the National Liberal Party–Tătărescu. From ca. 1950, Topa and various former PND affiliates were imprisoned by the Romanian communist regime, while others were recovered and enjoyed high favor.

== History ==
=== Origins ===
Iorga and Cuza traced their collaboration to 1895, when they were among the founders of a short-lived Universal Antisemitic Alliance. The PND's existence was formalized on May 6 [O.S. April 23] 1910 (Saint George's Day) as a union of two groups respectively led by Iorga and Cuza. Iorga had previously entered and left the mainline Conservative Party (PC). Putting out the nationalist review Neamul Românesc, he had also created a string of cultural-political societies, including the Brotherhood of Loyal Romanians, which had brought him into direct contact with Cuza; both men ran for Parliament seats as the "nationalist-democratic candidates" in 1907 (only Iorga was elected). By 1909, Cuza had also joined Iorga's lecturing team at Vălenii de Munte, where he outlined his producerist worldview: "Romania seems to have turned into a sewage canal [...] for all sorts of ethnic filth, and the Romanian cannot sustain himself, by honest labor, in his own country—so he perishes."

In its original form, the PND was united around the ideals of economic antisemitism, postulating that Romanian Jews were a parasitical or exploitative stratum of society. Its earliest recorded symbol was the right-facing swastika (卐), or "Aryan cross", which Cuza used as a symbol of his antisemitic struggle. Beyond that, the party's roots were in the more radical forms of generically ethnic nationalism: four years before the PND's foundation, Iorga had sparked a riot against the National Theatre, picked out for staging French plays, untranslated.

Structurally, the PND contested the third-party position, behind the PC and the dominant National Liberal Party (PNL). It was the first lower-middle-class organization in Romanian politics, its antisemitism and traditionalism being also manifestations of anti-capitalist anxieties. Its democratic demands included proposals to reform the 1866 Constitution by introducing "universal suffrage for the Romanians, with the representation of minorities".

Continuing Iorga's propaganda work, the party also endorsed the nationalism of Romanian communities in Bukovina and Transylvania (held by Austria-Hungary), and in Bessarabia (incorporated into the Russian Empire). Through PND and the Cultural League for the Unity of All Romanians, Iorga maintained alive the cause of irredentism and "Greater Romania". A final major rally point for the PND, was the agrarian platform, on which the PND clashed with the mainstream Conservatives. Explicitly set out against the "old parties", Iorga's group pushed for land reform through purchase, in effect "granting the peasants that large part of the land that is currently occupied by a fictitious great landed property". Iorga's stance on national and agrarian issue had made him a target for surveillance by the Siguranța secret police, which kept records of his movements.

=== Early history ===
The party was nominally led by its two founders as co-presidents; in practice, Cuza had a supporting role, with Iorga supervising all aspects, including recruitment. Overall, however, Iorga was largely uninterested in creating himself a centralized and coherent party, preferring to focus on cultural politics. The PND was always strongest in Western Moldavia and Oltenia, with some additional fiefs in Brăila and Ploiești. In Bucharest, the cadres included aristocrat Vasile Kogălniceanu, actor Petre Liciu, and Orthodox chaplain Gheorghe Cotenescu. They were joined by Leon Cosmovici, the biologist and social worker. The Moldavian wing included veterans of far-right antisemitism such as Ion Zelea Codreanu and Corneliu Șumuleanu, alongside writer Ion Ciocârlan. At a regional level, the party had in its ranks young radical-right militants such as Gheorghe Clime and Nichifor Robu. Also joining the PND were two Bessarabians: Dumitru C. Moruzi, the novelist, and Ilie Cătărău, the bullfighter and double agent (for the Siguranța and the Russian Okhrana).

After inconclusive negotiations for an alliance with the PC, the PND contested the elections of 1911 alone. Its main adversary was another candidate for the third-force role in politics, the Conservative-Democratic Party (PCD). The Bucharest list was headed by Iorga, while Kogălniceanu ran against them, as an independent; Liciu also ran, either as a PND affiliate or as an independent. In the wake of the elections, PND men complained that they had been harassed by the PCD, and that they could not hope to compete with it in the propaganda war. However, the PND itself also took up violence during the events, when Cătărău intervened to support Codreanu, who was running for a seat in Fălticeni. The party took some 15% of the popular vote in those precincts where it put up candidates, but failed to win any seats. In the recall vote of 1912, Cuza and Iorga were elected together, although Cuza lost the fief of Iași; Iorga lost at Covurlui, but won in Prahova. They were to remain for long the party's only two parliamentarians, and represented the more marginal Second Colleges, comprising the urban underclass.

By then, the PND was holding annual congresses on Saint George's Day, with peasant participation. During the one of 1912, with Cuza absent due to illness, Iorga announced that he no longer pursued the Bucharest proletarian vote, and that the party would only focus on campaigning among the intellectuals, merchants, artisans and the peasantry. Its propaganda program, carried out in conjunction with the Cultural League, included setting up public libraries. The event also market the official launch of Cuza's newspaper, Unirea, and included a memorial service for the recently deceased Liciu. The congress of 1913 showed the growing rift between Cuza and Iorga: the former supported quick intervention in what became the Second Balkan War, whereas Iorga opposed it (he was backed by various party activists, who found Cuza to be coarse and violent). The pro-war interventionist stance was also taken up by Kogălniceanu, who built on PND irredentism to propose Romania's expansion into "natural borders". Also around that time, at the University of Iași, Cuza's PND cell clashed with left-wing activists (Social Democrats and Poporanists) over control of the "Student Center".

Ideological differences inside the PND were again on display during early 1914, when the PNL's Ion I. C. Brătianu made public his own project for land and electoral reform. While Iorga approved of their moderation, Cuza and Codreanu campaigned for more radical policies. Inner-party tensions flared up in the first two years of World War I, during which Romania, under a PNL government, was cautiously neutral. Following his irredentism, Iorga involved himself in the camp which supported the Entente Powers, but did so rather cautiously, placing his faith in the Brătianu administration. The party split over the issue: Cuza pushed for immediate intervention against the Central Powers, declaring that neutralism was "absurd". At a grassroots level, Cătărău, who was probably responding to Okhrana commands, involved himself in acts of terror in Bukovina and Transylvania, trying to push Austria-Hungary into declaring war. During the international scandal which followed, he fled Romania in mysterious circumstances.

=== 1916 suspension and 1918 revival ===
In September 1915, Cuza stepped up his opposition to PND policies, joining Nicolae Filipescu's Unionist Federation. According to Iorga, the latter group perverted the nationalist cause, using its symbols in an attempt to topple and replace Brătianu. The highly inactive PND eventually suspended its activities in September 1916, some time after Brătianu had declared war on the Central Powers. The party was thus non-existent during the subsequent offensive and defeat, and its activists took flight during the evacuation of Bucharest. Taking refuge in Iași, where he continued to put out editions of Neamul Românesc, Iorga resumed his seat in the Assembly as an independent, declaring Cuza to be "dead to me".

During the uncertain interval that followed Romania's peace with Germany, the former PND militants reactivated their party cells. Putting out Unirea newspaper, styled PND mouthpiece, Cuza and Codreanu announced that the party had merged into the anti-PNL coalition called People's League (later "People's Party", or PP), which was headed by General Alexandru Averescu. Their move was rejected by Iorga, who called it an "usurpation" by "ambitious and weary men." Both Iorga and Cuza participated in the June 1918 election, won by the Conservatives under Alexandru Marghiloman.

The armistice in the West overturned the country's fortunes, reopening the possibility of creating "Greater Romania", and thus raising Iorga's popularity. The Unirea group capitalized on this, leaving Averescu's party, and rejoining the PND, which had been formally reactivated on November 26, 1918. Before going back to its original name, it briefly existed as the "Union of National Democracy". It circulated a radical program, promising land reform through expropriation, but also attracted into its ranks defeated "Germanophiles" such as Costică Negruzzi. The reconciliation with Unirea was marred in ambiguity, as Cuza continued to support Averescu from inside the party; Iorga, meanwhile, regarded the PP as a congregation of "upstarts", and precluded any collaboration with Averescu. The reformed party also attracted into its ranks new cadres from other backgrounds, including Gheorghe Tașcă, the economist and former Conservative.

The PND remained divided on issues pertaining to antisemitism. In April 1919, the Assembly voted on Jewish emancipation: Iorga, taking a pragmatic approach, voted in favor, while Cuza and Codreanu were the only two parliamentarians to vote against. In parallel, both Cuza and Iorga drifted toward regionalism, joining the ranks of a pressure group called Brotherhood of Unified Moldavia, which reunited them with leftists such as Paul Bujor. The PND, however, was opposed to more radical decentralizing tendencies, and especially to corporate rights for the ethnic and religious minorities: in June, Iorga polemicized over the issue with Bukovina regionalists Iancu Flondor and Mayer Ebner. The restored PND contested the November elections, carried by universal male suffrage, and the first ones involving the whole of Greater Romania. Its logo showing two hands shaking, it had as its regional ally the Bessarabian Peasants' Party (PȚB), on whose lists Iorga ran and won an Assembly seat at Orhei. The PND emerged as the fifth largest in Parliament, winning 27 seats in the Assembly of Deputies and nine in Senate; the PȚB had an additional 72 deputies. The growth was marginal, as the PND only convinced 5.7% of the Greater Romanian electorate. Iorga became a staunch critic of the electoral mores cultivated by the PNL and the PP, alleging voter intimidation and supposed communist infiltration.

The PND and the PȚB became parliamentary supporters of the Romanian National Party (PNR) cabinet, presided upon by the Transylvanian conservative Alexandru Vaida-Voevod. This was a moment of triumph for the anti-system and anti-PNL parties. Their multicolored coalition, called Parliamentary Bloc, also included the Peasants' Party (PȚ), the Democratic Union Party, and remnants of the Labor Party. The PP was also co-opted until Iorga, designated Assembly President, issued a verbal attack against Averescu. The latter resigned from the Interior Ministry. The PND again split into two factions, Iorga having omitted to present Cuza as a PND candidate for Averescu's post. At that junction, Iorga and his supporters pushed for Kogălniceanu to take over as prime minister, though the latter was under investigation for embezzlement.

=== FDNS ===
Iorga witnessed the mounting tensions between King Ferdinand I and the Parliamentary Bloc, and, hoping to prevent Vaida's fall, presented Parliament with a land reform project. On March 13, 1920, Ferdinand ordered Vaida to step down, and installed Averescu as his prime minister. Years later, the monarchist Iorga saw this exercise of kingly power as abusive, and a "crime of state". The People's Party organized the elections in May, securing Cuza's support. On April 26, an emergency congress of the PND reconfirmed Iorga as the party president. Cuza denounced Iorga as a sellout to "foreigners and alienated Romanians"; Iorga in turn denounced the breakaway leader as an irrational xenophobe and a "man of the past". However, as historian Armin Heinen observes, Cuza was also toning down his antisemitic discourse, since, in 1920, the idea of Jewish emancipation was "all too enshrined". Instead, his faction took up "radical slogans against the left, including threats of violence".

The Iorga faction, allied with the PȚ into a Federation of National Social Democracy (FDNS), used as its symbol the sickle. Iorga's party won 10 seats in the Assembly and two in the Senate, whilst the Cuza group, or "Nationalist-Democratic Christian Party" (PNDC), won only two Assembly seats. Iorga took the deputy seat in Covurlui. He had also been proposed for an eligible position in Transylvania, but was quietly rejected by the PNR.

The FDNS supported the Democratic Bloc, an anti-PNL and anti-Averescu alliance formed around Vaida-Voevod. Like Vaida, Iorga supported reconciliation with the wartime enemies, as demanded by the Supreme War Council, and the integration of ethnic minorities into Greater Romania. He engaged in heated debates with Cuza over the matter. During the Democratic Bloc episode, Iorga displayed fondness toward left-wing politicians, and promoted to ministerial office the Laborite Nicolae L. Lupu. Viewing the Socialist deputies with amused sympathy, he later criticized the PNL's heavy-handed repression of the new Romanian Communist Party (see Dealul Spirii Trial).

As noted by historians, the PND was, from as early as November 1918, a "center-left enterprise" or a "bourgeois-radical left". Observing this transition, communist Petre Constantinescu-Iași theorized the PND was a conjectural ally of his party, since they both rejected "capitalist oligarchy"; he argued, however, that the PND "cannot understand revolutionism [and] communist socialism", being largely made up of "naive" intellectuals "who fetishize motherland and tribe, which are in fact covers for capitalist exploitation."

=== LANC schism ===
In September 1921, the PND agreed to fuse into the PȚ. The pact eventually crumbled when Iorga fought against the arrival into the PȚ of Constantin Stere, whom he regarded as a wartime traitor. In December, the PND took the name of "Nationalist Peasants' Party" (Partidul Naționalist-Țărănesc), which it used alternatively until 1923 or 1924. In addition to Neamul Românesc, still its central organ, it published several regional newspapers. These include: Apărarea Națională, Dacia, Flamura and Vremea Nouă of Craiova; Biruința of Turnu Severin, Brazda Nouă of Bârlad; Crai Nou of Buzău and Focșani; Cuvântul Românesc of Râmnicu Vâlcea; Gazeta Satelor of Râmnicu Sărat; Poporul of Cernăuți; Răvașul Nostru of Fălticeni; Secera and Graiu Nou of Botoșani; Solia of Dorohoi.

The interim PCD government, led by Take Ionescu, was recalled in January 1922. Following Ionescu's sudden death later that year, Conservative-Democrat delegation, headed by Grigore Filipescu, approached Iorga for a fusion, but the latter insisted that they dissolve their party and enlist with the PND as simple members. The two PND factions reunited before the March 1922 elections, in which the PND used for its logo a black flag defaced with a white sickle. According to Iorga's notes, he and Codreanu toured Moldavia, where they were greeted by large crowds of peasants, but also heckled by the PNL's electoral agents; Iorga was proposed, by popular acclamation, for the Senate seat of Botoșani.

After some PND candidatures were ruled out by the electoral commission, Iorga declared the election fraudulent. The party only won only five seats in the Assembly and two in the Senate. In May 1922, at the height of renewed antisemitic incidents, Cuza, with Codreanu and Nicolae Paulescu, transformed the PNDC into a "National Christian Union". Dedicated to forcefully solving the "Jewish Question", and espousing religious antisemitism, it became the National-Christian Defense League (LANC) a year later, at a ceremony in which it flew Romanian flags defaced with swastikas. Assuming control of Apărarea Națională and Unirea, it was soon joined by another PND defector, the sociologist Traian Brăileanu, who had helped organize the party's chapter in Bukovina.

The PND was continuing its transformation into a moderate party. Its leader firmly condemned the terrorist activities of LANC regional leaders, primarily Corneliu Zelea Codreanu (son of the former PND member). He also took a firm stand against the anti-Jewish riots encouraged by Cuza and the Codreanus in Iași, demanding strict legalism; he and other PND-ists were in turn denounced by the antisemites for their alleged leniency, and threatened by the National Romanian Fascio. During the following decade, Iorga's Neamul Românesc put out at most 15,000 copies per issue, a fourth of the LANC's Porunca Vremii. In 1923, it was supplemented as a central organ by Răvașul Naționalist-Democrat, put out in Bucharest by Tașcă. In addition to maintaining control over Brazda Nouă, Crai Nou, and other regional organs, the PND established other, often short-lived, newspapers and magazines. They include Bănățeanul of Timișoara, Credința Naționalistă of Târgu Jiu, Cuvântul Naționalist of Bacău, Dâmbovița Nouă of Târgoviște, Democratul of Tulcea, Îndemnul of Pitești, and several publications named Coasa.

=== PNR absorption and PN revival ===
By 1924, Iorga had begun collaborating with Constantin Argetoianu, formerly an Averescu associate, changing the PND's name to "People's Nationalist Party" (Partidul Naționalist al Poporului, PNP). It organized itself in the Banat region, winning the adherence of Avram Imbroane and his Banatul Românesc weekly, and in Bessarabia, where it put out the monthly Brazda. For a while, the PNP was seen as the potential conservative pole, which would attract into its ranks the former PCD militants. By 1925, it had absorbed one other faction of the latter group, under Iulian Vrăbiescu, and a PNR dissidence, under Mișu Economu. Working from within the PNP, they sought to prevent any union between the PNP and the PNR, proposed during the party congress in Craiova (March 1925). Ultimately, the schism between Iorga and Argetoianu also prevented the conservative consolidation from occurring.

Later in 1925, the PNP, alongside other conservative groups, merged into the PNR. Iorga protested against the PNL-backed electoral law of 1926, voted just weeks before new general election, which granted a "government dowry" (supplementary seats in Parliament) to the party that had a plurality of votes. He was a PNR representative at talks for a common strategy with the PP and PȚ, which ended with him rejecting Averescu's offer for a three-party merger; as a result, Averescu was called to power and presided over the electoral campaign and tally. When this tactical alliance between the king and the PP sparked consternation among the Nationals and the Peasantists, General Eracle Nicoleanu visited the opposition leaders in Iorga's home, warning them not to resort to violence. The election was carried by pro-government candidates, but, according to Iorga himself, voters were intimidated by omnipresent Gendarmes. It marked a peak of LANC electoral politics, winning them 120,000 votes and ten deputies, largely in counties previously loyal to the PND. Iorga managed to win the only seats taken by the opposition in Covurlui and Sibiu County.

The PNR and PȚ finally merged with each other, as the National Peasants' Party (PNȚ), on October 10, 1926. On October 11, Iorga reestablished the PND under the provisional name of National Party (Partidul Național, PN), regretting the dispersal of his "united legion for a national future" and the PNȚ's preference for "social parties". Thus renewed, it had a square-in-square logo (回), and its Vice President was the educationist Dumitru Munteanu-Râmnic, founder of the summer school in Vălenii. Its new affiliates included the left-leaning sociologist Gheorghe Vlădescu-Răcoasa, who helped put out Neamul Românesc and contributed reports on its congresses, and Iorga's own son, the engineer Mircea Iorga.

The party and the newspaper were targeted by repressive policies under the new Averescu government, until the Prime Minister himself was compelled by Iorga to apologize and desist. The PN ran in the June 1927 election, but had just 24,600 votes (0.9%, behind the Peasant Workers' Bloc), and thus no seat in the resulting Assembly. Later that year, Romania's political system was reshuffled by the deaths of King Ferdinand and Brătianu. The PP and the PN found common ground in their shared resentment of the Romanian Regency regime, but also in their hostility toward the PNȚ; by June 1928, the PND also found common ground with the Ukrainian Social Democratic Party and other Bukovina regionalists, all of whom resented the PNL's centralizing policies. Iorga's party contested the elections of December 1928 as a People's Party ally, using the latter's six-pointed star as a logo. The elections were a major defeat for Averescu, whose alliance only won 2.5% of the vote and five seats in the Assembly. The PNȚ victory was seen by Iorga as proof of "demagogic debauchery".

=== In government ===
On June 6, 1930, with support from a pan-nationalist coalition that included Iorga, the deposed Prince Carol returned to Romania and deposed the Regency, enthroning himself as King Carol II. In April 1931, having been dissatisfied with the PNȚ, he appointed Iorga Prime Minister of Romania, at the helm of a government that advertised itself as "technocratic" and anti-systemic. The PN contested the 1931 general election as founder of the National Union alliance, which also included Filipescu's Vlad Țepeș League (LVȚ) and Argetoianu's Agrarian Union Party (PUA). It was allied with the paramilitary Union of Volunteers in its Transylvanian constituencies, and also enjoyed nationwide support from various groups representing the ethnic minorities: the German Party, the Union of Romanian Jews, and the Ukrainian National Party.

The National Union won 289 seats in the Assembly, including one for Mircea Iorga. A PN man, the mathematician Dimitrie Pompeiu, became Assembly President. His Vice President was another party official, the orthopedist Petre Topa. The latter was also leader of the PN's Caliacra chapter, while Mircea Iorga had a similar position in Turda County.

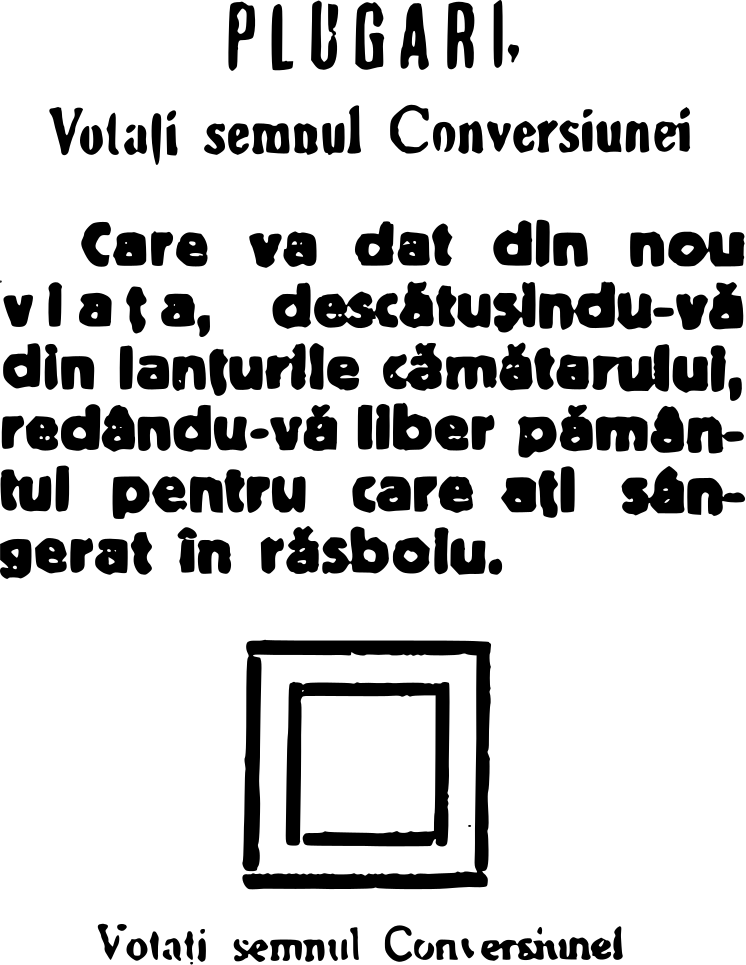
PN poster for the elections of 1932, reminding plowmen of the party's role in passing debt relief legislation

Although the arrival to power coincided with the worsening effects of the Great Depression in Romania, the cabinet was divisive on economic policy. Reportedly, Prime Minister Iorga took little interest in crisis management, leaving Argetoianu, the Minister of Finance, to be policy-maker; nevertheless, the two quarreled over details. Argetoianu and Gheorghe Ionescu-Sisești, the Minister of Agriculture, offered debt relief for farmers (a policy borrowed from the PNȚ) and a crystallization, then liquidation, of the state's own floating charge. This perceived attack on economic liberalism cause an uproar among foreign investors, and, at home, alienated Filipescu and the LVȚ. The measures were eventually ruled unconstitutional. The government's other tactic was to censor the press' reporting on the banking crisis and the lack of confidence, which only fueled speculation that Argetoianu had vested interest in protecting Marmorosch Blank Bank.

During those months, the opposition began referring to the governing dyad as "comedic dictators". Its fall was precipitated by the civil servants' protests, in particular the jailers' strike in Hotin. The PN contested the July 1932 elections in alliance with the PUA and a pro-Iorga list. The suffrage was marred by violence, including clashes between the state authorities and the LANC—but also between various parties and the rising radical-fascist dissidence of the LANC, led by Corneliu Codreanu, and known as the Iron Guard. These occurred after Iorga had renewed a (largely ineffective) order to ban the Guard. Nevertheless, in Communist Party directives for 1932, Iorga's own government was being referred to as "fascist".

=== Decline ===
The PN-led alliance won five Assembly seats, none of which were taken by the PN itself. The government fell, and was replaced by a new Vaida-Voevod cabinet, rallying mainly ministers from the PNȚ's Calist radical-right. The latter threatened to overturn the Argetoianu legislation, leading the PN into a "spontaneous" bloc of debt relief supporters, with the PUA, the League Against Usury, the Agrarian League, and the Georgist Liberals. In September of that year, the PN reverted to its old name of PND, being later joined by recruits such as Ion Buzdugan, the poet and president of the PND chapter in Bălți County, and archivist C. D. Fortunescu. Vaida fell in November 1933, and Ion G. Duca of the National Liberals replaced him. Iorga forbade the PND from enlisting in the election of December, describing it as a farce, and accusing Duca of gerrymandering.

By 1935, Iorga was losing the support of radical youths, whose nationalism was more mystical (against Iorga's secularism), and who were enlisting in, or sympathizing with, the Iron Guard. One of them, Petre Țuțea, defined the PND as a one-man party, but also a "source of light", hoping to draw it into an alliance with the Guard, the LANC, and Vaida's Romanian Front, and thus effect the destruction of the "democratic capitalist state". As Heinen notes, the PND had become "entirely insignificant" electorally; according to historian Francisco Veiga, it was "a historical relic that grouped together the professor's most dedicated followers". It could still claim to dominate over the Iron Guard in the higher echelons of academic life, where it had 12 registered members, including Iorga, Pompeiu, and Ionescu-Sisești, whereas the Guard had 8. Among the more senior leaders, Tașcă left and joined the openly Nazi National Socialist Party. He and other former PND technocrats later switched to the National Peasantists, with Tașcă becoming that party's adviser on economic policy.

Following Duca's assassination by an Iron Guard death squad, the PND watched from the side as Carol turned to collaboration with the PNL's right-wing. Gheorghe Tătărescu, inclined to use "extreme nationalism" to offset the Guard, became his premier. According to Iorga, the Duca assassination was "disgusting", but mostly dangerous in that it gave Tătărescu a free mandate to repress political life. In a 1936 interview, he suggested that the job of government was to "clamp down on all madmen", stressing however that he did not consider communism a relevant foe: "once I'll see some intelligent Romanians taking up communism, that's when I'll begin fearing [it]. But up until then, given that it's only about foreigners and unintelligent Romanians, I have no such fear". The PND was nonetheless alarmed when, during the by-elections of Hunedoara County, Ghiță Pop of the PNȚ campaigned with support from the Jiu Valley communist cell.

Iorga's support for the monarchy and his ostensible legalism were complemented by a strong stance against Nazi Germany, generally advocating a pro-French system of alliances between anti-German "small states", resting on the Little Entente. He watched with revulsion as the Iron Guard organized a heroes' funeral for its volunteers in the Spanish Civil War, and intervened to pressure Tătărescu into banning and disarming the movement. Nonetheless, the PND approached the National Christian Party (PNC), a successor of the LANC. By 1937, Cuza and Iorga were on amiable terms, the latter referring to the former as "a great elder of this nation", and being in turn celebrated by the PNC as Romania's "greatest speaker".

=== 1937 election and 1938 dissolution ===
In November 1937, Averescu, who was informed that Carol plotted to dissolve all political groups and establish a personal dictatorship, proposed forming a national unity government under Gheorghe Brătianu. The option failed to enlist crucial support from the PNC, who wanted a "government of generals and magistrates", with Octavian Goga as its president. That same month, some PND members, including Topa, became junior members of Tătărescu's "enlarged cabinet", which existed for the purpose of overseeing new elections in December. Like the PNC, the Romanian Front, and the PP, it ran on a common list headed by the PNL. Also joining this pact by proxy was the Nazi-influenced German Party, which had an understanding with Vaida.

In his private records, Iorga observed that Romania was undergoing a "movement to the right", with campaigning monopolized by the Iron Guard and the PNC. Behind the scenes, the PNC, the PND and the Iron Guard were still discussing a common approach—during the electoral campaign, Iorga, Cuza, Gheorghe Cantacuzino-Grănicerul, and other leaders of minor parties (including Filipescu, Argetoianu, and Grigore Iunian), met secretly at Dalles Hall. During the proceedings, Cuza insisted for a cabinet that would include all those present as ministers. The election results were a tie: although the PNL-led alliance won a plurality (36%) of the vote, it could not form a government against the PNȚ and the Iron Guard; the latter two were also short of decisive seats in the Assembly. On December 28, the king used his prerogative and assigned power to the PNC, which had 9.15% of the vote, and the premiership to Goga. For the next 44 days, the country experienced chaos: the Guard paramilitaries and the PNC's Lăncieri clashed in the streets, and took turns attacking Jewish-owned businesses.

During its weeks in government, the PNC modified the electoral law, hoping to absorb smaller parties into its ranks, and began negotiating with Iorga a fusion with the PND. Pressured by the king, Iorga accepted to form a PNC–PND electoral coalition, which also gathered support from the German Party. This arrangement did not prevent Iorga from demanding a return to constitutional norms, including by forming a national unity government and overturning Goga's laws. In February 1938, Carol ordered Goga to step down, replacing him with Miron Cristea, the apolitical Orthodox Patriarch; he made Iorga, Averescu, Tătărescu and Vaida members of a government steering committee, ordering them to quit their parties. Following this, Carol established his National Renaissance Front (FRN) and proclaimed an authoritarian constitution—Iorga accepted the demise of the PND, and played a part in the decision to outlaw all the other parties. He also helped shape a new set of racial laws, more liberal than those enforced by the PNC; these new regulations barred those who had not been Romanians for "at least three generations" from holding public office—allegedly targeting the Codreanus.

Remnants of the PND still organized as an "intermediary group", or distinct FRN faction, during the sham elections of June 1939, although the authorities sought to prevent their interference with the electoral process. Topa, Ionescu-Sisești, and Pompeiu were also appointed to high ceremonial office under the FRN rule. Iorga remained a full member of Carol's Crown Council, in which capacity he played an instrumental part in repressing the Guard, by instigating Corneliu Codreanu's arrest (and, indirectly, his killing in custody). Two years later, as the FRN regime collapsed and was replaced by a Guard government, or "National Legionary State", Iorga was sought after and murdered as revenge.

=== 1940s revival and aftermath ===
For the remainder of World War II and the Nazi-aligned Ion Antonescu dictatorship, Topa led efforts to reestablish the PND. In 1942, Vlădescu-Răcoasa founded the Union of Patriots (UP), a pro-Allied resistance group, and was swiftly arrested by the Antonescu regime, then sentenced to life in prison. From early 1944, Topa was also drawn into such opposition projects. Styled "Social Democratic Party–Topa", to distinguish itself from the Romanian Social Democratic Party (PSDR), the PND signed up to an underground "National-Democratic Coalition". Inaugurated by the National Liberal Party–Tătărescu (PNL-T), it also comprised the UP, the Ploughmen's Front, the Socialist Peasants' Party, MADOSZ, and the PSDR itself. Speaking for the group, Mihai Ralea defined its constituent parties as "on the left". A report circulated by the Siguranța explained these as "radical-democratic groups", in opposition to "right-wing democrats" from the mainstream PNȚ and PNL.

In August 1944, a coalition formed by King Michael I, the PNȚ, PNL, and the Romanian Communist Party (PCR) organized the coup against Antonescu. This took Romania out of the Axis and reestablished a liberal system of government, but one increasingly controlled by the PCR. Released from prison, Vlădescu-Răcoasa transformed the UP into a political party, closely aligned with the PCR, and participated in government as a delegate of the communist-led National Democratic Front. Pompeiu was also co-opted into the communist establishment, and appointed to high offices in the academic world.

At the time, the communized Siguranța followed closely the PND's activities. Its agents claimed that the PND was turning into a dissident "workers' party", absorbing into it a "reactionary socialist" faction under Ioan Flueraș. It reported that the two party presidents were Munteanu-Râmnic and Pompeiu. Later records show that Flueraș's "socialist democratic party" was still independent from the PND. The latter, still led by Topa, existed in close proximity to Tătărescu's liberalism. It ultimately merged into the PNL-T shortly before the 1946 election, with Topa returning as its representative in the Assembly. The following year, a former PND cadre, dentist Petre Rădiță, became an ally of the communists. A Romani by ethnicity, Rădiță helped government seize control of the Romanies' General Union.

Some of the PND members were targeted by repression following the establishment of a Romanian people's republic in late 1947. Gheorghe Cotenescu became an active supporter of the anticommunist resistance, and was imprisoned by the regime after 1949. Topa was also arrested, in May 1951, part of a group charged (spuriously) with "spying for the Vatican". He was dispatched to the "labor colony" of Peninsula, on the Danube–Black Sea Canal, serving as its prison doctor. Topa died in captivity in 1957, as did his one-time party colleague Tașcă. Ionescu-Sisești was stripped of his position in the Romanian Academy in 1948, but allowed back in in 1955.

== Ideology ==
=== Generic traits ===
Contemporary analysts, from Dimitrie Drăghicescu to Lucrețiu Pătrășcanu, have described the PND as a highly personalized group, with Iorga at its center, and one largely incapable of organizing itself into a mass party. Historian Lucian T. Butaru argues that, in the 1910s, the PND had a "hybrid doctrine", "a symptom of political gaming in that twilight era of the census suffrage." During the early interwar, Drăghicescu suggested that the party's program, "for it has one", did not differentiate the PND from other conservative forces, in particular the Romanian National Party, on whose electorate it relied. Historian Petre Țurlea also suggests that: "The position of the Democratic Nationalist Party on all matters that relate to Romanian society is entirely identifiable with that of its founder [Iorga]."

More generally, Iorga's movement revamped the old tenets of Iorga's Sămănătorul circle, bridging romantic aesthetics and a doctrine variously called "illiberal nationalism", "heterodox conservatism", or "right-wing populism". As such, it formed part of a larger anti-liberal phenomenon of early 20th-century politics. Academic Ioan Stanomir sees the PND as a symptom of "continental neoconservatism", largely shaped by international populism and, locally, by the 19th-century poet-ideologue Mihai Eminescu. According to Veiga, Iorga's movement functions as both a concrete revival of Eminescu's tenets and a Romanian counterpart to Poland's Endecja. In a larger European context, the PND press also revered the Action Française and the French reactionary right.

Functionally, PND doctrines represented "the rejection of urban-industrial society by the petty and middle bourgeoisie". As claimed by the communist Petre Constantinescu-Iași, the PND was not just averse to the upper class and industrialization, but "threatened" by it, since its constituents "live[d] under the same exploitative conditions as the urban proletariat [...] overwhelmed by the capitalist class." From the conservative club Junimea, Iorga borrowed, reshaped, and radicalized the old critique of state-enforced Westernization, integrating it into the nationalist agenda. Early on, Iorga and Cuza both had designs of education reform which doubled as critiques of positivism; Cuza's proposal was "overtly xenophobic and anti-Semitic." According to historian Maria Bucur, the PND failed to win over the Transylvanian middle classes; its "bombastic impassioned speeches about historical precedence and unjust past suffering", she notes, were less appealing than the modernizing promise of liberal eugenics.

=== Fluctuating antisemitism ===
The PND is remembered as one of the first Romanian parties to be formed around a platform of explicit antisemitism. As noted by Veiga, Cuza's anti-Jewish narrative, both within and without the PND, was "obsessive and firebrand", with hints of racial antisemitism; however, it did not discriminate against Jewish women, and was always more secular than that of his LANC colleagues. Iorga was generally more reserved, beginning his career as a skeptic of Jewish assimilation on producerist grounds, somewhat influenced by Karl Lueger.

In the 1920s, as scholar Leon Volovici informs, Iorga became "conciliatory" on the Jewish issues, and was "anxious to minimize" his earlier alliance with Cuza. Through Nicolae Paulescu, the LANC viewed the PND's leader as "kike-turned", accusing him of having endorsed Jewish businesses, and, with them, alcoholism. Cuza also accused Iorga of changing his "regimen" by giving in to Jewish temptations. In 1931, the Alliance Israélite Universelle noted the Iron Guard's admiration for Iorga, but also that the latter "openly rejects antisemitic formulas and methods". With noted reluctance, Iorga finally accepted Jewish emancipation. Especially during the 1923 riots, he denounced the LANC's policy of imposing Jewish quotas as absurd. The 1920s saw him maintaining amiable links with Jewish intellectuals, in particular Aristide Blank.

According to Butaru, his "more complex" nationalism only gave "sporadic" support to the racist far-right, mainly because the latter was also nationalist and monarchist. The PND's episodic government saw the formation of a parliamentarian Jewish Party, which accused Iorga and his ministers of not taking any action against antisemitism; however, Iorga's "National Union" still won endorsements from the apolitical Union of Romanian Jews. Iorga argued that the Jews were not Romania's "natural enemy" and were capable of cooperating with "the legitimate masters of the land", stating that he preferred allying himself to Jews over signing any pact with Nazis. In 1937, Tudor Arghezi published an electoral manifesto attributed to the PND and dated to 1930–1932—written in Yiddish and addressed to the Jews, but kept secret from Christian voters, it appealed to patriotism as a shared value of both communities.

In the late 1930s, the PND was again committed to economic antisemitism, theorizing that Romania was being invaded by the "Judaic spirit" and a "Hebrew network of exploitation". Nonetheless, Iorga urged his followers to display "no hatred toward the Jews. Only support and love for the Christian tradesman." Such speeches divided Romanian public opinion: the LANC and the Iron Guard celebrated his return to the fold, whereas moderates noted Iorga's overall reserve, and his positive appraisal of ancient Jewish culture. The latter opinion is also held by Țurlea, who notes: "[Iorga] was neither an antisemite, nor a philosemite; he was a defender of his People, while maintaining the conditional of equal rights for all of the Country's citizens."

Shortly before World War II, Iorga openly criticized the PNC's antisemitic program, which he viewed as anti-constitutional, but made occasional returns to explicit antisemitism—such as when he signed up to editorials calling for the "delousing" of Romania. Overestimating the Jews' numbers and influence, he stated that his main goal was waging an economic "war" though industriousness and boycotts, but also through a "sensibly organized" expulsion of some Jews. Topa also entertained such ideas, publishing in Buna Vestire a call for the Romanianization of the medical corps. The PND press was deeply involved, alongside far-right newspapers, in campaigns against literary modernism in general, and Jewish modernist writers in particular, calling for censorship and repression of "pornography". Himself a modernist, Arghezi noted that Iorga had changed his beliefs on the issue "6 times every 24 hours", a man with "two heads that ram into each other".

=== Corporate state ===
As Veiga notes, Iorga's political ideals always referred to recovering an ancient "model of Volksgemeinschaft—real or fictitious", and an idealization of supposed "peasant republics" from Romania's distant past, party-less and non-bureaucratic. His advocacy took the form of regionalism, though one not necessarily tied to the historical borders. In 1919, while openly denouncing separatism, Iorga advocated the restoration of Greater Moldavia as an autonomous entity to include both Bukovina and Bessarabia, and with the unprecedented annexation of borderlands in Transylvania. By 1934, he was proposing a restoration of ancestral links with the creation of ținuturi ("lands"), which were to cut across regionalist and ethnic interests. Under his plan, Făgăraș would have been united with Argeș, and Hotin with Cernăuți.

As Heinen notes, the overall nationalist message of class collaboration and organicism clashed with the party's "social pledge". Thus, the PND switched between the promise of universal suffrage and land reform, and proposals to bring back the estates of the realm. During the 1910s, reflecting Cuza's background in right-wing socialism, the PND issued calls for social insurance, but limited these to Romanian workers. In 1911, Dumitru C. Moruzi described social democracy as a civilized alternative to Russian nihilism. The hierarchy of PND political dimensions was outlined by Iorga himself: "we are first of all nationalists, then democrats, then peasantists. [...] There is nothing we place above the nation, not even social justice." His promise in December 1915 was to create a "national and popular state, grouping together, with equal rights, Romanians of all classes and Romanians from all countries."

During its existence as "National Party", the PND switched its priorities, and became openly anti-democratic. By the time of Carol's return to the throne, it was closely aligned with the Vlad Țepeș League and the Cuvântul group in their denunciation of the parliamentary system. Iorga talked of a "moral reform", and of "creating a new soul for the Romanian people." The PND–LVȚ alliance in favor of technocracy managed to shake, then topple, the PNȚ coalition in 1931. According to Veiga, the Iorga cabinet was a "battering ram", the first of several used by Carol against parliamentary power. Contrarily, Stanomir writes that Iorga's ideology was primarily a conservatism à la Edmund Burke, its "tribulations" merely "a symptom of the difficulties that the local conservative movement underwent in its adaptation." In 1934, Iorga described the PND as "perfect constitutionalists", opposed to dictatorial experimentation, although he expressed support for creating a permanent, non-elected, legislative council. He also favored corporatism as a governing principle, but noted that the state needed to be kept out of it.

In its penultimate phase, the party veered into explicit support for corporate statism, as the basis for a legal dictatorship. Iorga's support for left-wing causes weakened just as his rejection of the Iron Guard became explicit: he rejected socialist humanitarianism, and the legacy of Enlightenment philosophy, seeing them as a subterfuge for left-wing totalitarianism. He maintained a friendship with Italy during his term as prime minister, earning backing from most other political groups—since, at the time, Italy was averse to Nazi Germany; on a more personal level, Iorga looked upon Italian fascism with noted sympathy. This was reciprocated by the Italians, who offered Iorga a position on the steering committee of their Action Committee for Roman Universality.

Observing the political realignments of 1937, Iorga mused that "shackled parties" were becoming "a thing of the past" (a probable reference to the waning ideological coherence of his own PND). He revered the corporative monarchy as a return to the "idealized, organic, and hierarchical world", and, in his final years, suggested that the proper economic and social model revolved around artisans and their guilds. When confronted with Carol's own modernizing-totalitarian ambitions, Iorga stated his preference for an authoritarian multi-party system, and for long refused to don the National Renaissance Front uniform.

== Electoral history ==
=== Legislative elections ===
Election	Votes	Percentage	Chamber	Senate	Position
1911			0 / 183	0 / 112	
1912			1 / 183	1 / 110	4th
1914			2 / 188	0 / 125	4th
1918			2 / 174	0 / 121	4th
1919			27 / 568	9 / 216	5th
1920			10 / 366	2 / 166	8th
1922			5 / 372	2 / 148	7th
1928	In alliance with the PP		2 / 387	0 / 110	4th
1931	Part of the National Union		3 / 387	0 / 113	
1932	Part of the National Union		0 / 387	0 / 113	10th (within the National Union)
