= Nicolae Xenopol =

Romanian politician, economist and writer (1858 - 1917)

Nicolae Dimitrie Xenopol
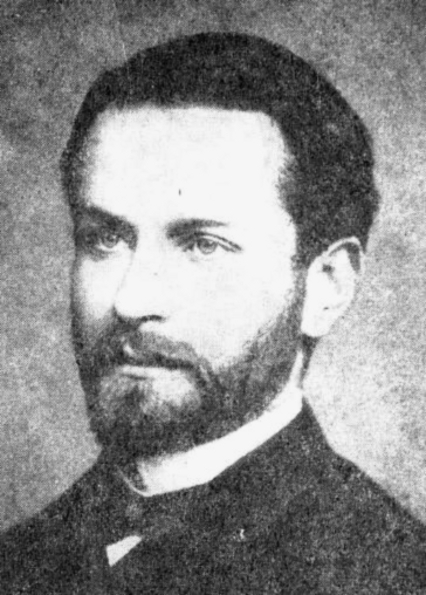
- Xenopol as a youth

Romanian Minister of Commerce
- In office October 14, 1912 – December 31, 1913
- Monarch: Carol I
- Premier: Titu Maiorescu
- Preceded by: Dimitrie S. Nenițescu
- Succeeded by: Alexandru G. Radovici

Personal details
- Born: October 11, 1858 Iași, Moldavia
- Died: December 1917 (aged 59) Tokyo, Japan
- Party: Conservative-Democratic Party

Nicolae Dimitrie Xenopol (Romanian pronunciation: [nikoˈla.e diˈmitri.e kseˈnopol] or [ksenoˈpol], also Nicu Xenopol; Francized Nicolas Xenopol; October 11, 1858 – December 1917) was a Romanian politician, diplomat, economist and writer, the younger brother of historian Alexandru Dimitrie Xenopol and, like him, a member of Junimea society. Initially inspired by Junimea leader Titu Maiorescu, he was later a dissident of Junimism, a Positivist and a supporter of literary realism. Politically, Xenopol also moved away from conservatism and was embraced by the liberal current, serving as editor of two liberal newspapers: Românul and Voința Națională. He had a successful career in electoral politics, which began within the National Liberal Party and later saw him joining the Conservative-Democratic Party. In 1912, he was Minister of Commerce, and helped create an Academy of Economic Studies.

Xenopol was the author of two realistic novels criticizing the social environment of his day. His campaign for realism and his positive coverage of urban civilization pitted him against the conservative author Mihai Eminescu. Their violent debate of the 1880s is one of the highlights in Xenopol's career in cultural journalism. His passionate involvement in support of the liberal cause was another topic of controversy, and, on several occasions, he dueled with his colleagues in the press.

Late in his life, N. Xenopol supported Romania's involvement in World War I alongside the Entente Powers. He died while carrying out his final mission, as Romania's first Ambassador to Japan.

== Biography ==
=== Early life ===
The Xenopol brothers were of foreign origins: their father, known locally as Dimitrie (and allegedly born Xenopoulos), was a British and Greek subject of the Protestant faith, who settled in the port of Galați and converted to Romanian Orthodoxy. He was of Jewish descent. Dimitrie opened the way for his son's political, literary and diplomatic career: he was a Dragoman for the Prussian mission to Moldavia, a tutor of the Rosetti family children, a boarding house manager, and ultimately a prison warden. The Xenopols' mother, (née Vasiliu), was of Greek origins.

Nicolae was born in the Moldavian capital, Iași, as one of Dimitrie's six children: he had two brothers (Alexandru and Filip, the future architect) and three sisters. He completed his secondary education in that city. By 1877, he was affiliated with Junimea, a conservative literary society founded by Maiorescu, Petre P. Carp, Iacob Negruzzi and other Moldavian men of letters. The club members responded to his quest for affirmation, and provided him with money to study abroad: after attending the University of Paris, he took his Doctor of Law diploma at the University of Liège. It was during his training period that Xenopol met and befriended other young Romanian students, including the future dramatist and theater manager Alexandru Davila. The grant did not meet all of his needs. He worked during most of college, and, for a while, gave up, trying to enlist in the Romanian Land Forces, or concentrating on writing his novel Brazi și putregai ("Fir Trees and Rot").

Xenopol made his debut as a novelist and a realist writer with the humorous work Păsurile unui american în România ("The Griefs of an American in Romania"), serialized by Junimea's Convorbiri Literare journal from late 1879 to mid 1880. Brazi și putregai first saw print as a series in the Junimist tribune Timpul (1880).

By 1882, N. Xenopol had drifted away from Junimea, and, as the Junimists noted, may have lured Maiorescu's protégé, Ion Luca Caragiale, to join him in anti-Conservative politics. He was at the time involved with the newspaper Românul, a mouthpiece of left-wing liberalism, and became its main editor. Working under liberal chief C. A. Rosetti, he was seconded for a while by Constantin Bacalbașa, who came from the liberal gazette Telegraful. Xenopol's Românul chronicles there pleaded for a realistic literature, capable of describing class conflict—for Xenopol, the model to follow was a young novelist from Transylvania, Ioan Slavici. Another author highly praised by Xenopol was the Junimist Nicolae Gane: both Xenopol and his former patron Maiorescu believed that Gane's short story set the standard for a new literary language.

Xenopol called for Slavici's novels to be studied by other writers, and then be used in creating an urban-themed, fully modern, literature. The pillar of Junimist poetics, Mihai Eminescu, responded to this argument with a virulent article, which identified Xenopol's theories with cosmopolitanism and alienation. Initially overwhelmed by Eminescu's tone, Xenopol replied with a mordant piece in Telegraful (April 1882), where the focus was on Eminescu's own ethnic origins. According to literary historian Constantin Cubleșan: "Politically, [Xenopol] became noted as a Junimea adversary, writing unusually violent lampoons against its members, with coarse and demeaning language".

=== PNL and Voința Națională ===
In short time, Xenopol affiliated with the National Liberal Party (PNL), whereas Junimea had become an inner faction of the Conservative group. For a while in 1884, he was Head of the Bucharest Public Library. In 1885, PNL Prime Minister Ion Brătianu made Xenopol his personal secretary. Also then, Xenopol welcomed the Belgian visitor Émile Louis Victor de Laveleye, arranging him a meeting with C. A. Rosetti.

This period marked the start of another open conflict between Xenopol and the Junimists: the former took over as editor of the PNL mouthpiece Voința Națională, and began publishing essays denouncing the backwardness of Junimist ideology. By October 1886, Xenopol even sided with Junimea's Marxist adversaries at Contemporanul, and allowed Marxist leader Constantin Dobrogeanu-Gherea to publish anti-Maiorescu pieces in Voința Națională. He collected such articles, adding his own, into the brochure Contrazicerile d-lui T. Maiorescu ("Mr. T. Maiorescu's Contradictions"). During 1885, Xenopol also directed the antisemitic campaign against the Alliance Israélite Universelle, with unsigned articles which may or may not have been written by Caragiale.

Another target for Xenopol's attacks was his former Românul colleague C. Bacalbașa. The latter demanded satisfaction for claims made about him in Voința Națională, and the two journalists dueled each other at the racecourse in Băneasa. The understanding was that the loser would be the first to shed blood: Bacalbașa's blade touched Xenopol's finger, and Xenopol conceded defeat. Later in the year, Voința Națională focused its gibes on the Conservative paper Epoca. As a result, Xenopol was visited in his home by two Epoca men, Nicolae Filipescu and Alexandru A. Balș, who threatened him with physical harm; Xenopol pulled a gun on them, and the authorities were called in—Filipescu and Balș received prison terms, but were pardoned 3 months into their sentences. Xenopol himself was still a passionate duelist, and, in one other instance, is said to have charged an adversary with a blade after their duel of pistols ended in a draw.

N. Xenopol's activities reached into other fields. He and the Bukovinian composer Ciprian Porumbescu wrote a choral, Erna, published by the Armonia Music Society in 1885. The same year, he lectured at the Romanian Atheneum in Bucharest. His conference, published as a booklet later in the year, was a satire of Romanian politics, and carried the title Hatîrul ("The Favor").

N. Xenopol married, in 1887, the daughter of Băicoianu (Baycoiano), Prefect of Mehedinți County. In 1891, the young author collected his satirical articles into a single tome, Cronici glumețe ("Funny Chronicles"); Păsurile unui american în România was first published as a volume the following year. Still a PNL man, Xenopol was first elected to the Assembly of Deputies during the 1895 suffrage, and preserved his seat for several mandates, before moving to a similar position in the Senate. He was a member of all successive Romanian legislatures until 1917.

In parallel, N. Xenopol carried on with his cultural initiatives. In March 1895, he lectured at the Romanian Atheneum on the topic of "crowd psychology", criticizing Scipio Sighele's ideas on the topic. In 1898, he accepted an invitation from art patron Alexandru Bogdan-Pitești, and joined the steering committee of his Ileana art society, which grouped independent painters reacting against academic art.

N. Xenopol made his return to journalism in 1904, when he founded a French-language magazine, Le Mouvement Economique ("The Economic Movement"), directed by him until 1915. By 1906, he had left the PNL and joined the Conservative Party. The Conservative cabinet of Gheorghe Grigore Cantacuzino made Xenopol a member of its delegation, which negotiated a new trade agreement between the Kingdom of Romania and the French Republic. Well regarded by his superiors, he was later a Romanian negotiator of economic treaties with the Ottoman Empire and Austria-Hungary.

=== PCD, Țară Nouă and ministerial term ===
In January 1908, Xenopol affiliated with a Conservative splinter group, which became the Conservative-Democratic Party (PCD) and had Take Ionescu for leader. Later that year, his analysis of land reform in Romania was published by the Österreichische Rundschau in Austria-Hungary. Also then, Xenopol was made Officer of the French Republic's Legion of Honor. His conferencing on Romanian economic subjects earned him international exposure: in May 1910, he lectured in Paris, invited by the Revue Générale des Sciences.

In 1911, Xenopol joined his brother Alexandru and fellow critic Mihail Dragomirescu in editing the journal Țară Nouă ("New Country"). It hosted contributions by some acclaimed writers, such as I. Dragoslav, Victor Eftimiu, Leon Feraru, Corneliu Moldovan, Cincinat Pavelescu, and Elena Văcărescu. Although it received contributions from numerous Romanian academics and made special efforts to reach the Transylvanian public, Țară Nouă eventually closed down in 1912. In parallel, his merits as an economist were recognized internationally, and he was made a member of France's Société d'Economie Politique.

Nicolae and Alexandru Xenopol were both involved in nationalistic agitation for the cause of Romanians in Transylvania and other regions of Austria-Hungary. In 1911, some of their books had been censored in Transylvania, and were subject to confiscation by the Hungarian Gendarmes. The same year, in May, N. Xenopol was called upon as an expert witness in the trial between antisemitic academic A. C. Cuza and lawyer Emanoil Socor. Xenopol was supposed to testify as to whether Socor had been right to call Cuza a plagiarist, but he recused himself.

N. Xenopol's political career peaked in 1912. That year, after the PNL and the PCD toppled the Conservative-Junimist Premier Petre P. Carp, and Maiorescu formed a governing alliance with Take Ionescu, Xenopol joined the administration. Ionescu, Constantin Dissescu, Alexandru Bădărău and Xenopol, who took over the Ministry of Commerce, were the four PCD ministers in Maiorescu's cabinet. His time in office saw the adoption of some major labor laws, whereby he structured the professions, regulated trade unions (including the Civil Servants' Chamber) and provided for workers' compensation. His major accomplishment was the establishment of an Academy of Economic Studies, independent from the university system. The irregular character and the staff appointments by government were rather controversial, and Xenopol's policies earned much criticism in the Romanian media of the 1910s.

A protectionist, Xenopol was interested in opening up new markets for Romanian products, but also favored France's economic interests over those of Germany. In May 1913, Xenopol visited the Kingdom of Italy, trying to increase the share of Italian investments in his country (according to his own estimate, Italy was the fifth exporter to Romania). During the last days of 1913, Maiorescu handed in his government's resignation, opening the way for a new National Liberal administration; his had been the last ever Conservative premiership.

=== World War I and death ===
The start of World War I reignited Nicolae Xenopol's career. Like other members of the PCD and PNL, and like his historian brother, he clamored his belief that Romania should renounce her neutrality and join the Entente nations. Their adversity was aimed at Austria-Hungary and the Central Powers, and their hope was that the Entente would help Romania to annex Transylvania. N. Xenopol was a guest speaker at the major pro-Entente rally of early October 1915, where Take Ionescu was also present. He joined a trans-party irredentist group called Federația Unionistă, presided upon by his former Conservative enemy Nicolae Filipescu, with Ionescu as Vice President. One of the regular members, Transylvanian poet-activist Octavian Goga, remembered Xenopol as "intelligent and industrious", but of dubious honesty.

In 1916, Xenopol returned to publishing with a French-language study, La Richesse de la Roumanie ("Romania's Wealth"). It was in effect a condemnation of Romania's attachment to Germany and Austria-Hungary, beginning with the bilateral trade agreements of the 1870s. Xenopol contended that the imports from Austria-Hungary had destroyed branches of the Romanian economy, such as the shoe-making industry, and that Germany had sabotaged the Romanian export of cattle; he also argued that the Austrians were working to force Romania into becoming their vassal, as part of a Balkan Zollverein.

Filipescu's Federația happily dissolved itself in September 1916, shortly after Romania sealed an agreement with the Entente. In his closing speech, Filipescu welcomed the declaration of war as the dawn of a Greater Romania. In 1917, as Romania made efforts to recover from a German invasion, Xenopol was dispatched to the Empire of Japan (a fellow Entente country). Although fatigued, he took the perilous journey through the Russian Empire, and, as a tribute to the war effort, refused to take money for his services. He was Romania's first Ambassador to Tokyo, but died there, only months after taking over his post. One of his last efforts was helping a stranded group of Romanian Transylvanians sail for the US West Coast. In hindsight, literary historian Dan Mănucă notes that Xenopol, like his World War II successor, Gheorghe Băgulescu, was among the few Romanian diplomats who "also went earnestly about their duties in propagating our culture".

== Literary work ==
=== Views and polemics ===
Already as a Junimea participant, Nicolae Xenopol cut a liberal and rebellious figure. Historian Alex Drace-Francis refers to him as a culture critic "from the liberal, progressive wing of Junimea". Among the Junimist intellectuals, Xenopol and George Panu stood out for being fully committed to the Positivism of Auguste Comte—the others were more interested in German idealism, evolutionism or metaphysical naturalism. Unlike the elitists and the misanthropists, he believed that "crowd psychology" was generally a constructive factor in the course of human civilization. Xenopol's ideas were also more permeated by new trends in literary theory—according to cultural historian Zigu Ornea, he was "exasperated" by "the ossification of the Junimist aesthetic doctrine". Constantin Cubleșan refers to Xenopol as not just a realist writer, but also "a fine analyst" of the realist current, citing his ideas on Ioan Slavici: "It is enough for a novel to be about national life, whatever the character types [...]. The essential is that those types should be truthful, and, as far as the events are unfolded, never stray from reality".

Ornea suggests that Xenopol's rebellion against first-generation Junimism and Maiorescu was first evident in 1878, when the young man came into direct contact with contemporary French literature. The resulting conflict with the Junimists was bitter and spiteful. Eminescu attacked in him the "superimposed stratum" of foreign intruders, calling him "Mr. N. Xenopoulos", and cautioning him that the "defects of one's race" were showing in Xenopol's praise of urban literature. Xenopol replied in kind. According to his account (also taken up by the liberal poet Alexandru Macedonski at Literatorul magazine), Eminescu was of Bulgarian origin, and therefore not of pure Romanian stock. His own 1882 portrait of Mihai Eminescu (whom he called by his birth name, Eminovici) was purposefully grotesque and inflammatory, but, as Cubleșan notes, particularly colorful. It reads: "[Eminescu has] an odd head with four edges, such as Bucharesters have surely seen among Bulgarian laborers [...]. This individual wears purple trousers, a borrowed black frock and a large black hat, exactly like those of Germans who walk about with the street organs on their backs; he is always covered in mud and his face and hands carry countless traces of purple ink".

In reply, Eminescu stated that, regardless of the Slavic suffix in Eminovici, his own lineage was Moldavian and aristocratic. Author and psychologist Vlad Mixich cites Eminescu's full answer as a sample of press insult in late 19th-century Romania: "The things Mr. N. Xenopoulos says are, in my view, the figments of a fomenting imagination, excited by the sting of my putdown. But who do you think you are to be allowed, at your age and with the knowledge you don't have, to give yourself such superior airs?"

=== Writings ===
Literary historian Tudor Vianu writes that, in his beginnings, Xenopol was "a lyrical poet, swift in his rhymes". According to Cubleșan, that part of Xenopol's career should be dismissed, as his patriotic poetry, including a piece about Dragoș Vodă, is in general pastiche from better known writers. Instead, Xenopol's prose was directly inspired by what Vianu calls "the direct observation of local realities". Vianu classifies Xenopol and the Junimist Leon C. Negruzzi in the same realist subgroup of Junimist literature, but adds that Negruzzi had always been a romantic.

Iohnson Blackwurst, the Yankee protagonist of Păsurile unui american în România, is the voice through which the paradoxes of Romanian society are evidenced with sincere bemusement. Xenopol noted that his was a satire of Romanian life, intended to show how "the disgusting reality" of Romania is perceived in advanced "bourgeois" societies. As Vianu suggests, the ultimate inspiration for Xenopol's work was an 18th-century model, Montesquieu's Persian Letters.

Written as a journalistic parody of Romantic travel literature, Iohnson Blackwurst's story begins with his naive quest to study the Romanians, Europe's "bravest people", and ends in bitter disappointment: during his visit to Iași, Blackwurst is humiliated, cheated and confused. The work is sketchy, and the narrated episodes have morals that are largely illustrations of Xenopol's political views. The narrator believes that the Jewish community is parasitical and destructive, that the political class is endemically corrupt, and that the only productive class, on whose backs Romania herself was erected, are the peasants.

Building on the conclusions of various other critics, Cubleșan notes that, although Păsurile... is incomplete as a novel, its biting wit remains interesting. Philologist Ioana Costa suggests that Blackwurst's story is far from being a great novel itself, but that, as a "mixture of frivolity, localized satire [and] current events", it contains "the seeds of that classical literature that has given Convorbiri Literare its unmistakable imprint".

Brazi și putregai is seen by Cubleșan as more ambitious, more rigorous and more meticulous project, in effect "a faithful mirror of late 19th-century Romanian society", midway between the proto-realism of Nicolae Filimon and the complex narratives of Duiliu Zamfirescu or Mihail Sadoveanu. At its core, Brazi și putregai is about the downfall of an aristocratic (boyar) family, unable to maintain its status in a modernized society. The central character, Alecu Negradi, is a sternly patriarchal boyar who has rebuilt his family's fortune, and who attempts to break in his rebellious son Iorgu by forcing him to manage an isolated mountain estate. From this point on, Alecu Nagradi's entire universe falls apart: his son finds new ways to disobey him, his wife commits adultery, and his peasants rise up in revolt; Iorgu's sister, Maria, bequeathed to a much older man, elopes. She escapes the manor just as the buildings go up in flames, without realizing that the peasants have murdered her father.

The book is foremost noted for its complex descriptions of nature scenes and people interacting. According to an admirer, the historian and writer Nicolae Iorga, Xenopol portrays his characters in such detail as to "compete with the barbers". However, Xenopol's use of antiquated Romanian has led some to suggest that Brazi și putregai is no longer digestible. As early as 1925, novelist Cezar Petrescu concluded that the novel's atmosphere is "oldish and obsolete". Writing in 1955, critic Teodor Vârgolici also assessed that Brazi și putregai "is mostly of interest as a literary document" (a verdict seen by Cubleșan as "too drastic").

Xenopol's criticism of Romania's political system was also given expression in Hatîrul. According to Xenopol, favoritism and corruption were undermining the strength of Romanian society, since they detoured well-meaning projects, allowing one to interfere with the course of justice, or even to talk the Railway Company into servicing one's private residence.

== Legacy ==
Largely forgotten by the general public, Nicolae Xenopol was better remembered in professional circles: in 1929, he was dedicated a monograph, published by the Academy of Economic Studies, with contributions from Alexandru Averescu, Dimitrie Gusti, Take Ionescu, Mina Minovici, Gheorghe Tașcă, Nicolae Vasilescu-Karpen, etc. Tașcă, Henri Cihoski and various Academy graduates collected money for a Xenopol statue, but the project was put on hold and only taken up by the Academy in 2011.

Xenopol's dispute with Eminescu was revisited in a 2002 book by critic Alexandru Dobrescu: Detractorii lui Eminescu ("Eminescu's Detractors", second edition 2006). Poet and Convorbiri Literare book critic Emilian Marcu notes: "[The detractors] are in fact intellectuals of great amplitude, who express opinions that are somewhat in contraction with those imposed officially. [Dobrescu's] book gives us a chance to rediscover [...] texts by authors who are at least honorable, over which, alas, the dust of oblivion has set. Their return into an intellectual circuit can only be beneficial for all those who truly wish to know more about the great Eminescu". Similarly, critic Bogdan Crețu notes that Dobrescu managed to overturn the "poltroonish" classification of Xenopol and others as "detractors": "the new anthology [is] an honest exercise in the reevaluation of an epoch that is much more nuanced and rich than the books of literary history or the dictionaries will have us know". Contrarily, other experts routinely list Xenopol as mainly an anti-Eminescian—his has an entry among the "detractors of Eminescu" in Săluc Horvat's dictionary of Eminescu exegetes (published in 2010).

N. Xenopol's Bucharest villa, on Arcului Street, was ravaged by neglect during the decades of Romanian communism. According to a 2008 article by critic Dan C. Mihăilescu, it is one of the few well restored period buildings in downtown Bucharest.
