= Leon Feraru =

Romanian and American poet (1887 – 1961)

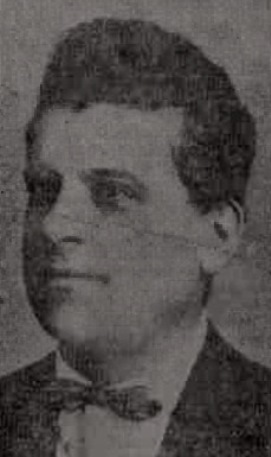
- Feraru in 1926
- Born: Otto Engelberg; 1887; Brăila
- Died: 1961–1962 (aged 73–75); New York City
- Occupations: Poet; journalist; philologist
- Writing career
- Pen name: Ola Canta, L. Feru, H. Libanon
- Period: ca. 1908–1954
- Genre: lyric poetry
- Literary movement: Social realism, proletarian literature

Leon Feraru (born Otto Engelberg, also credited as L. Schmidt; 1887 – 1961 or 1962) was a Romanian and American poet, literary historian and translator. Cultivating proletarian literature while frequenting the Symbolist movement, he displayed both his origins in the Romanian Jewish underclass and his appreciation for the wider Romanian culture. He popularized the latter with his work in America, having left in 1913 to escape antisemitic pressures. A translator, publicist, and public lecturer, he was involved with the Romanian press of New York City, and eventually as a Romance studies academic at Columbia and Long Island. Feraru's poetry, collected in two volumes, mixes Romanian patriotism, traditionalist references, and modern industrial aesthetics.

== Biography ==
Born in Brăila into a modest Jewish family, his father was an ironworker (fierar), the origin of his pseudonym. He completed his basic education in his native city, graduating from the Schwartzman Brothers school and then the Bălcescu Lycée. He was for a while enrolled at the Faculty of Medicine in Bucharest, where met and befriended figures from all major currents in Jewish political and artistic life—he befriended Zionists such as A. L. Zissu as well as advocates of assimilation, and took an interest in the Yiddishist movement (including by once appearing on stage in a musical play by Abraham Goldfaden). This period was interrupted by his taking a literature and law degree from the University of Montpellier, though he also had a published debut in Saniel Grossman's Jewish review, Lumea Israelită. Barbu Nemțeanu's Pagini Libere also hosted his work in August 1908. According to his biographer Alexandru Mirodan, he was "attracted by social democracy", and looked upon its Romanian theoretician, Constantin Dobrogeanu-Gherea, as a personal "idol".

Following the antisemitic outcry that came about as a result of the staging of Ronetti Roman's play Manasse and similar episodes, Feraru renounced his training as a physician and began planning his departure from Romania. As noted by Mirodan, in 1907 his Romanian university colleagues had begun harassing and shaming Jews. The insults he received then made him consider suicide and, Mirodan notes, also gave him a foreshadowing of fascism. His dignity was defended publicly by a Romanian poet, Dimitrie Anghel, with whom he had a close bond. Feraru is credited with having helped alter Anghel's own antisemitic stance, making him into a noted defender of Jewish emancipation. In 1910–1912, Feraru's poetry was featured in two of the major Bucharest literary journals, Flacăra and Convorbiri Critice, as well as in Symbolist Al. T. Stamatiad's Grădina Hesperidelor. Alongside Stamatiad, Enselberg-Feraru was also an affiliate of the Vieața Nouă circle, and a regular at its coffeehouse salon, La Gustav. Other reviews that ran his work included Viața Romînească, Noua Revistă Română, Viața Literară și Artistică, Ecoul, and Conservatorul Brăilei. Pen names he used in these publications were Ola Canta (shared with Anghel), H. Libanon and L. Feru. Feraru was friends with Jean Bart, Camil Baltazar and especially Anghel, with whom he collaborated on several poems (Halucinații, Orologiul and Vezuviul). They are thought to be mostly, or entirely, Anghel's work.

By late 1912, Feraru was a leading contributor to Nicolae Xenopol's Țara Nouă. He interrupted this work in early 1913, when he left Romania for the United States in early 1913. Anghel, who died a year later, addressed his departing friend a public proof of support, the Scrisoare către un emigrant ("Letter to an Emigrant"). In his adopted country, Feraru became a constant promoter of Romanian culture, as confirmed by his correspondence and noted in the accounts of his contemporaries. He married a fellow Romanian immigrant, who had lost her fluency in Romanian; he insisted that she relearn the language, and also taught it to their child.

Initially working as an unskilled laborer, Feraru eventually became a teaching assistant at the University of Toronto. He then was a professor of Romance languages and literature at Columbia University (1917–1927), contributing to The Romanic Review and Rumanian Literary News (which he edited). In October–November 1917, at New York's American Jewish Congress, he and Joseph Barondess were rapporteurs on the condition of Romanian Jews. By 1919, he was working on the city's Romanian American community press. In January 1920, he and Dion Moldovan were editorial secretaries at Steaua Noastră. Our Star, Phillip Axelrad's self-proclaimed "Oldest Best and Most Popular Roumanian Weekly Newspaper in America". In March, Feraru and Moldovan issued their own România Nouă, which only put out one issue.

Some four years later, Feraru was rediscovered by the left-wing Romanian newspaper, Adevărul, mainly through its contributor Iosif Nădejde—who published his correspondence with Anghel. This series was discussed by Alexandru Cazaban of the rival Viitorul, who argued that Nădejde would never have taken an interest in Anghel had it not been for Feraru. In 1925, the latter made a return visit to Romania, tending to his family's grave and feeding his urge to converse in Romanian, but also setting up a Society of the Friends of the United States. His first book of poetry was Maghernița veche și alte versuri din anii tineri ("The Old Shanty and Other Verse of Youth"), put out by Cartea Românească of Bucharest in 1926. During the early 1920s, Feraru was a contributor to Omul Liber, a social-literary bimonthly edited by Ion Pas, Curierul, Pessach, Pagini Libere, and Tânărul Evreu. In 1922, Adevărul Literar și Artistic published his recollection of "Ola Canta" work with Anghel, alongside his copy of an Anghel manuscript.

Back in America by February 1926, Feraru received became Honorary Consul of Romania in New York, by appointment of King Ferdinand I. He was employed by Long Island University (1927–1947) as professor and, for a while, as head of the foreign languages department. He wrote two English-language critical studies of Romanian literature: The Development of the Rumanian Novel (1926) and The Development of the Rumanian Poetry (1929). His research received sympathetic coverage from historian and Prime Minister Nicolae Iorga: "[Feraru's studies] are not just an enjoyable read, but also sometimes contribute innovative pieces of information and assessment, such as are worthy of one's attention." Feraru also translated selections from Mihai Eminescu, Tudor Arghezi, Panait Cerna, Anton Pann, Vasile Cârlova and Dimitrie Bolintineanu into English. In May 1929, he gave public readings of these at Sunnyside.

Feraru was later featured in Cugetul Liber, put out in Bucharest by Pas and Eugen Relgis, his texts also published in the Union of Romanian Jews organ, Curierul Israelit. Feraru's work was sampled in literary newspapers such as Victoria, Ateneul Literar, Junimea Moldovei, and Cafeneaua Politică și Literară. His second and last book of Romanian verse came out in 1937 as Arabescuri ("Arabesques"), issued as a supplement by Pas' social democratic review Șantier. He submitted articles and reviews for The International Encyclopedia (1930) about Gala Galaction, Mateiu Caragiale, Ioan Alexandru Brătescu-Voinești, Lucian Blaga, and his friend Baltazar. Retiring in June 1954, through his will Feraru left Columbia University, which paid his pension, his library of some ten thousand Romanian-language books. He died in New York City in 1961 or, according to other sources, 1962. His memory lingered among younger authors as they themselves reached old age; in the 1980s, Geo Bogza composed a prose poem about a dream sequence involving Leon Feraru. In 2012, relatives of Feraru, the Schreibers, were still residing in Brăila.

== Poetry ==
According to literary historian and critic George Călinescu, Feraru's poetic works fall into two separate categories: "moving" regrets for his native Romania, and samples of proletarian literature, including an ode to the sound of hammers in industrial Brăila ("his most valid" poetry). Another such ode, addressed "to the needle" and published in Convorbiri Critice, was lauded by its editor Mihail Dragomirescu: "Leon Feraru, a formal virtuoso, [...] presents here the sort of talent that he will rarely rise up to in later years." Mirodan writes that Feraru wrote for the working class "at a time when nobody asked one to dedicate poetry to such a class (but quite the contrary). [...] young Feraru, shaking off the bucolic temptations of that age, saw the city as going on the offensive". According to Eugen Lovinescu, Feraru fits best in a "realist and social" subset of Romanian poets, alongside Relgis and Vasile Demetrius; Călinescu also places Relgis and Feraru in the "poetry of the professions" category, with the likes of Barbu Solacolu and Alexandru Tudor-Miu.

In his more sentimental poems, Lovinescu notes, Feraru showed influences from Romanian traditionalists and Symbolists: Anghel, Panait Cerna, George Coșbuc, and Ștefan Octavian Iosif; his poems of homesickness no longer relevant to the modern and "evolved capacity for expression." According to novelist Dem. Theodorescu, who reviewed his poetry for Adevărul, Feraru could not hide his Romanian poetic soul in "the iron discipline of American life"—"his childhood was his nationality". His patriotic verse, Theodorescu noted, displayed a "grieving harmony". Similarly, sociologist Mihai Ralea noted the contrast between Feraru's "sentimentalism", or "unsoiled gentleness", and "that diabolical anthill of technology [...] that is America." In Maghernița veche, "none of the poems is about American life. [...] The only sentiment that is induced to [Feraru] by that alien world across the ocean is a longing for his native country".
