= Alexandru Bădărău =

Romanian politician, academic and journalist (1859–1927)

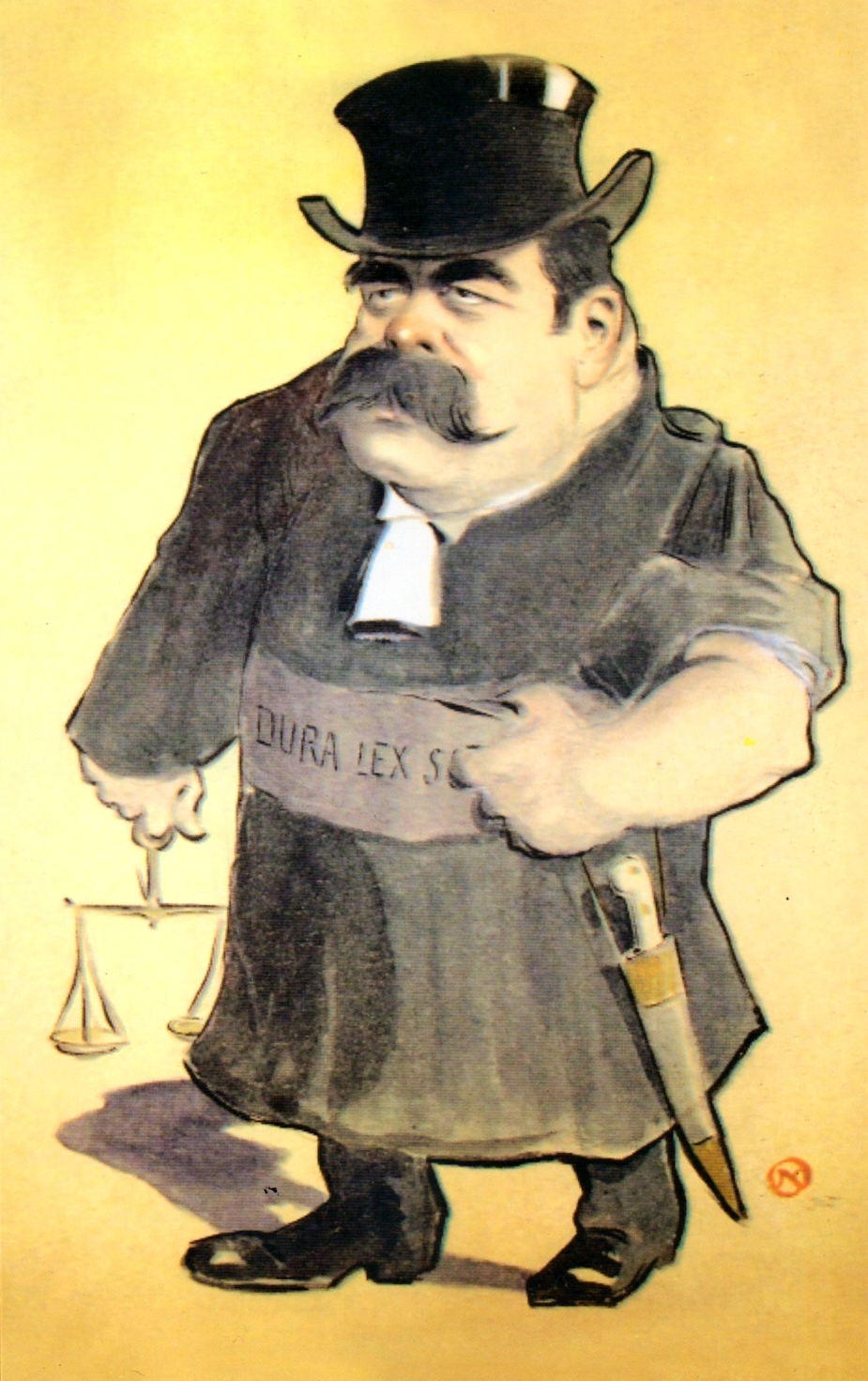
- Caricature of Bădărău by Nicolae Petrescu-Găină

Mayor of Iași
- In office 22 April 1899 – 19 February 1901
- Preceded by: Nicolae Gane
- Succeeded by: Constantin B. Pennescu

Minister of Justice
- In office 22 December 1904 – 15 June 1906
- Prime Minister: Gheorghe Grigore Cantacuzino
- Preceded by: Alexandru Gianni
- Succeeded by: Dimitrie Greceanu

Minister of Public Works
- In office 14 October 1912 – 31 December 1913
- Prime Minister: Titu Maiorescu
- Preceded by: Ermil Pangrati
- Succeeded by: Constantin Angelescu

Personal details
- Born: Alexandru A. Bădărău; April 9, 1859 Bădărăi, Iași County, United Principalities
- Died: March 27, 1927 (aged 67) Iași, Kingdom of Romania
- Party: Conservative Party; Conservative-Democratic Party
- Education: University of Paris; Free University of Brussels
- Occupation: Politician, academic, journalist

Alexandru A. Bădărău (April 9, 1859–March 27, 1927) was a Romanian politician, academic, and journalist.

== History ==
Born in Bădărăi, Iași County (now in Botoșani County), his father was the local mayor. He studied at the National College in Iași, graduating first in his class in 1877. He then entered the University of Iași, but was expelled in 1881 for participating in the socialist movement. Bădărău continued his education at the University of Paris, where he obtained a law degree, also earning a diploma from the École Libre des Sciences Politiques. He then took a doctorate in literature and philosophy from the Free University of Brussels. While there, he took part in a socialist circle that published Dacia viitoare magazine in 1883.

After returning home in 1885, he became a French teacher at two schools in Iași as well as a psychology professor within the local university's literature faculty. Together with George Panu, he founded the Radical Democratic Party in 1888; this merged with the Conservative Party (PC) in 1897. He was elected to the Assembly of Deputies as a PC candidate. In 1908, he left the Conservative Party, following Take Ionescu into the Conservative-Democratic Party.

Bădărău was mayor of Iași from 1899 to 1901, undertaking a vigorous civic activity. One of his priorities was to create a public water-supply system to bring water from the Prut River to the city; he argued at length with his predecessor, Nicolae Gane, who favored bringing water from Timișești. After he left office, the Timișești variant was chosen, and Bădărău went there in April 1907 for the start of the works.

He twice served as minister in Conservative cabinets: under Gheorghe Grigore Cantacuzino, he was Justice Minister from December 1904 to June 1906; under Titu Maiorescu, he was Public Works Minister from October 1912 to December 1913. After World War I, he founded Opinia newspaper, where he was a frequent contributor. He died in Iași and was buried in the city's Eternitatea Cemetery.
