= 1914 Romanian general election =

General elections were held in Romania between 18 and 28 May 1914.

== Results ==
=== Chamber of Deputies ===
Party	Seats
National Liberal Party	143
Conservative Party	21
Conservative-Democratic Party	18
Democratic Nationalist Party	2
Dissident Liberals	2
Independents	2
Total	188
Source: Sfera Politicii

=== Senate ===
According to the Constitution, the crown prince and eight bishops had the right to sit in the Senate.

Party	Seats
National Liberal Party	80
Conservative Party	22
Conservative-Democratic Party	13
Dissident Liberals	2
Total	117
Source: Sfera Politicii
