= 1907 Romanian general election =

General elections were held in the Kingdom of Romania in June 1907.

== Background ==
A peasants' revolt between February and April 1907 was put down by the army, leading to thousands of deaths. In the midst of the revolt, Prime Minister Gheorghe Grigore Cantacuzino resigned on 25 March. Dimitrie Sturdza of the National Liberal Party subsequently formed a new government on 26 March.

== Results ==
=== Senate ===
According to the constitution, the crown prince and eight bishops had the right to sit in the Senate.

The results detailed below are partial as two seats were in dispute at the time of the announcement.

Party	Seats
National Liberal Party	90
Conservative Party	10
Disputed	2
Total	102
Source: Tribuna
