= Timpul =

Romanian newspaper

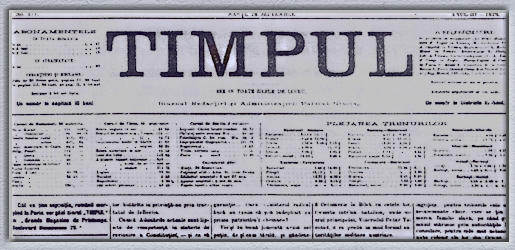
Timpul logo, May 9, 1877

Timpul (Romanian for "The Time") is a literary magazine published in Romania. Originally a political newspaper, it was the official platform of the Conservative Party between 1876 and 1914. Following the merger of the Conservative Party with the Liberal-Sincere Party, which resulted in the Liberal-Conservative Party, the newspaper Timpul merged with the newspaper Binele public on 18 March 1884, being replaced by the new publication România. Starting 13 November 1889, it returned to its original name, Timpul, and was published under this title until 14 December 1900. After merging with the newspaper Constituționalul, it was published from 15 December 1900, under the name Conservatorul as the official organ of the Conservative Party until 15 November 1914. Mihai Eminescu, Ion Luca Caragiale, and Ioan Slavici all worked at Timpul.

The publication is still active and published as a monthly in Iași, with print and online editions.

== Bibliography ==
- Academia Republicii Populare Române, Dicționar Enciclopedic Român, Editura Politică, București, 1962-1964
- G. Băiculescu, G. Răduică, N. Onofrei, 1969, Publicațiile periodice românești, tom 2, 1907-1918, București, Editura Academiei Republicii Socialiste România, pag. 132.
