= 1912 Romanian general election =

General elections were held in Romania on 8 and 18 November 1912. They were the first elections in which Romanian citizens living in the province of Dobruja were allowed to vote, with Constanța County and Tulcea County gaining representatives in the Romanian Parliament for the first time, despite having been part of Romania since 1878.

== Results ==
=== Chamber of Deputies ===
| Party | Seats |
|---|---|
| Conservative-Democratic Party | 84 |
| Conservative Party | 62 |
| National Liberal Party | 35 |
| Democratic Nationalist Party | 1 |
| Independent Conservative | 1 |
| Total | 183 |
Source: Apostol Stan

=== Senate ===
According to the constitution, the crown prince and eight bishops had the right to sit in the Senate.

| Party | Seats |
|---|---|
| Conservative Party | 45 |
| Conservative-Democratic Party | 40 |
| National Liberal Party | 24 |
| Democratic Nationalist Party | 1 |
| Total | 110 |
Source: Anastasie Iordache
