= Alexandru Marghiloman =

Romanian conservative statesman (1854–1925)

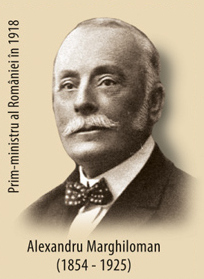

Prime Minister of Romania
- In office 18 March [O.S. 5 March] 1918 – 5 November [O.S. 23 October] 1918
- Monarch: Ferdinand I
- Preceded by: Alexandru Averescu
- Succeeded by: Constantin Coandă

Personal details
- Born: July 4, 1854 Buzău, Wallachia
- Died: 10 May 1925 (aged 70) Buzău, Kingdom of Romania
- Party: Conservative Party
- Spouse: Elisa Știrbei (m. 1890; div. 1906)
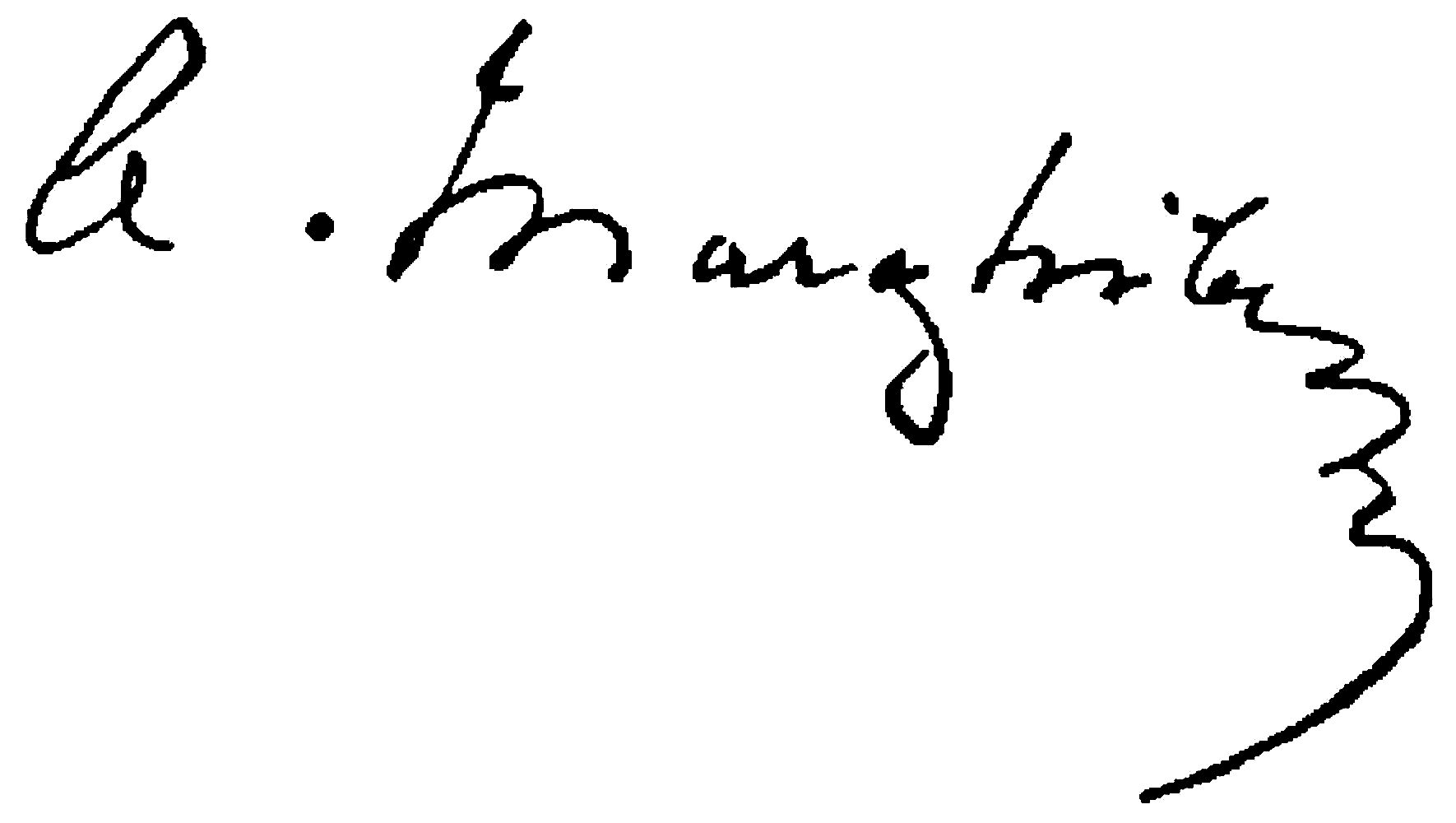
- Signature

Alexandru Marghiloman (4 July 1854 – 10 May 1925) was a Romanian conservative statesman who served for a short time in 1918 (March–October) as Prime Minister of Romania, and had a decisive role during World War I.

== Early career ==
Born in Buzău, he entered the Saint Sava National College in Bucharest, and then studied Law in Paris. Marghiloman was elected to the Romanian Parliament in 1884, and joined the government in 1888.

A member of the Conservative Party, he supported cooperation with the German Empire and Austria-Hungary in the Triple Alliance, and, at the beginning of World War I, he favoured neutrality. Romania remained neutral until 1916, when she entered on the Allied side and this was the reason he refused a seat in the Ion Brătianu's liberal government.

After the Germans occupied Bucharest, he remained there as the president of the Romanian Red Cross, and acted as a mediator between the German occupation authorities and the Romanian population. He rejected the ideas of the German side of forming a parallel administration to King Ferdinand I's government that was moved to Iași.

== Cabinet and later years ==
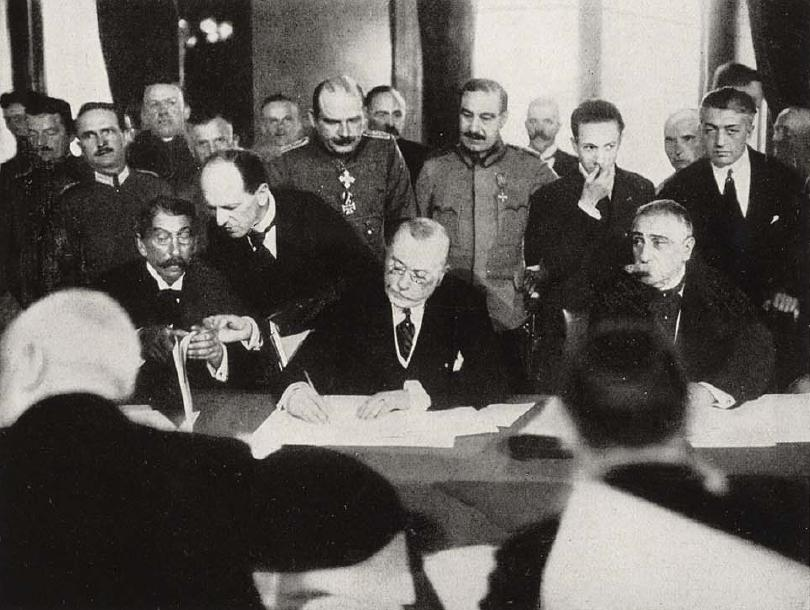
Alexandru Marghiloman signing the Treaty of Bucharest on 7 May 1918

However, since Bolshevist Russia withdrew from the war and the Germans could occupy the rest of Romania, King Ferdinand requested Marghiloman to become a Prime Minister, hoping that with a pro-German Prime Minister it would be easier to make peace with the Germans, and knowing that Germany would consider the Western Front to be much more important.

Indeed, Marghiloman negotiated and signed a peace treaty (known as the Treaty of Bucharest) with the Central Powers on 7 May 1918, which proved to be very punitive and restrictive for Romania. However, this treaty was never ratified. Marghiloman's cabinet fell after the Armistice of Villa Giusti, and it was replaced quickly with the pro-Allied General Constantin Coandă on 6 November, under whose cabinet Romania re-entered the war against Germany on 10 November, a day before the end of the war. Retired from public life following the collapse of Conservative politicians in post-war Greater Romania, Marghiloman died in his native town.

== Trivia ==
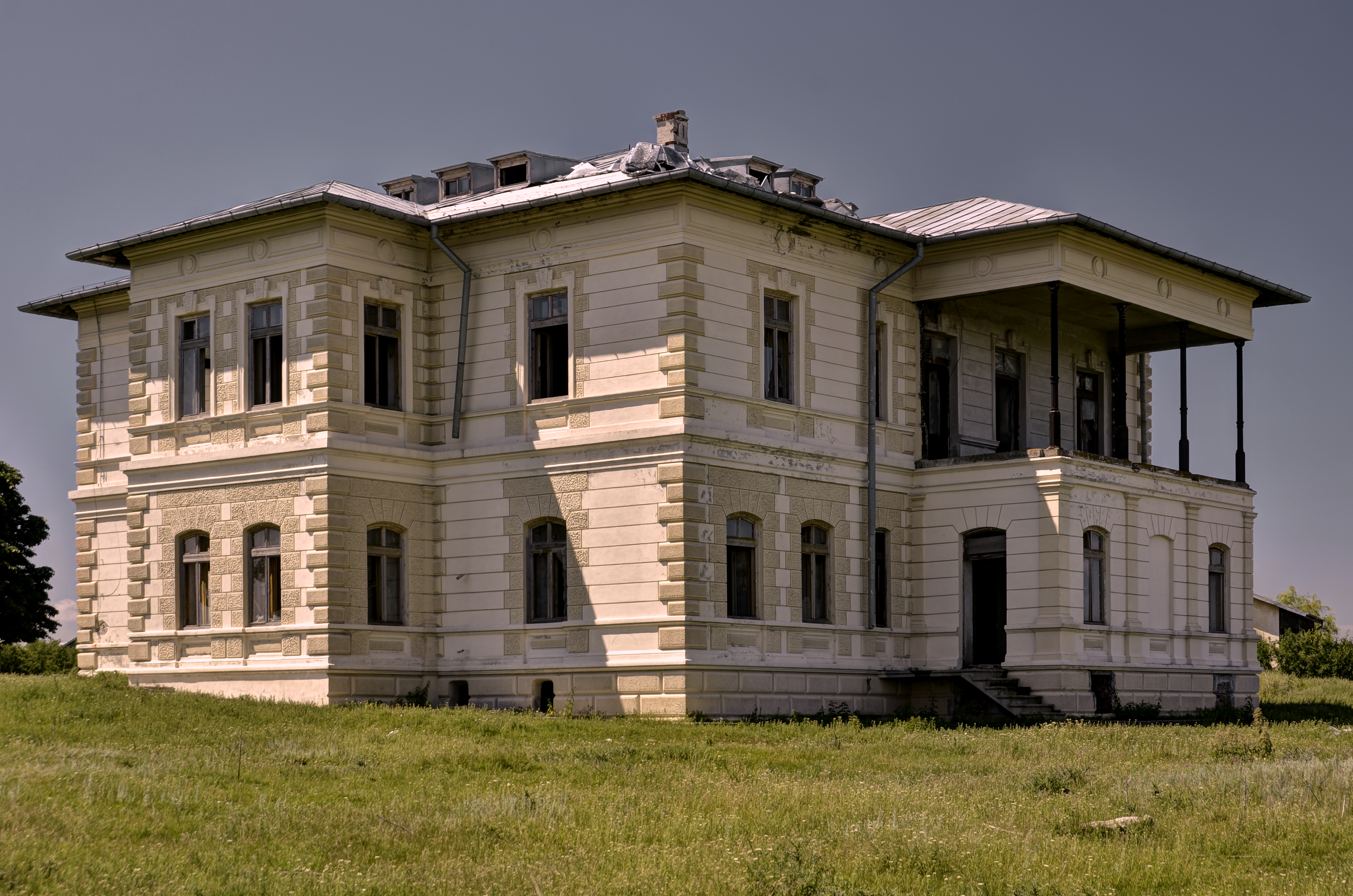
The Marghiloman mansion in Sinești

In his private life, Marghiloman was also an enthusiastic horse breeder: horses owned by him won the Romanian Derby 28 times. His large estate, the Albatros Villa (named after one of his horses) in Buzău, was for a long time a meeting place for Conservative politicians. He also had a mansion in Sinești, which was built in 1869–1874.

Marghiloman gave his name to Marghiloman coffee, Turkish coffee boiled in brandy.
