= Conservative-Democratic Party =

Dissolved Romanian political party

Conservative-Democratic Party Partidul Conservator-Democrat
- Leader: Take Ionescu
- Founded: 3 February 1908
- Dissolved: 21 November 1922
- Split from: Conservative Party
- Merged into: Romanian National Party
- Newspaper: Ordinea; Acțiunea; Evenimentul; Românimea
- Ideology: Liberal conservatism Progressive conservatism
- Political position: Centre-right

The Conservative-Democratic Party (Romanian: Partidul Conservator-Democrat, PCD) was a political party in Romania. Over the years it was also known as the Democratic Party or the Conservative Unionist Party.

The Conservative-Democratic Party was established on November 21, 1908, by the separation of a wing from the Conservative Party led by Take Ionescu, having the goal of creating the third ruling party, meant to interrupt the cycle of "governmental rotation" between conservatives and liberals. The electoral base of the party was made up of representatives of the small bourgeoisie (traders, small and medium-sized real estate and movable property owners, industrialists, wealthy peasants, etc.) and liberal professions (lawyers, teachers and doctors. Another important party's supporters led by Take Ionescu was the state officials and the "urban intellectual proletariat" – high school graduates who could not be absorbed by an insufficiently developed labor market.

The core of the new party's political program was, as its only president, Take Ionescu, said, "putting conservative ideas on the democratic ground of the country." In practice, this political vision materialized in the adoption of contextual solutions, oscillating between conservative and liberal ideas. The party's political program, adopted at the congress held in 1908, was revised several times: in 1910, and then, in 1913 when the Liberals' proposal to revise the constitution was accepted, including the expropriation and extension of the right to vote, and in 1919 when it was adapted to the new post-war political realities.

The party was indissolubly linked to its leader Take Ionescu, who led it throughout his life. First, the party progressed very fast, when it succeeded to win the vast majority of the partial elections held between 1908 and 1910, ahead of the detached Conservative Party from which it split. However, King Carol I refused to recognize this new political reality and abandon the system of liberal-conservative alternative at the government, and thus, never entrusted the task of forming the government to the Conservative-Democratic Party.

In 1912–1914, the party has participated in the government, within the coalition governments, together with the conservatives, and in 1916–1918 with the liberals, and in 1919–1920, with the People's Party. The only time when the Conservative Democratic Party been a lone in the government was December 17, 1921 – January 19, 1922, when the presidency of the Council of Ministers was ensured by Take Ionescu.

The death of Take Ionescu on June 21, 1922, led to the party disappearance, which at that time was rather a group of friends than a true political formation. On November 21, 1922, the party officially ceased its activity when its merging by absorption, with the Romanian National Party led by Iuliu Maniu was announced.

The most important leaders of the party were Take Ionescu, Nicolae Titulescu, Alexandru Bădărău, Constantin Dissescu, Toma Cămărăşescu, Gheorghe Derussi, Stelian Popescu, Gheorghe Mironescu, Mihail Vladescu, Mihail Oromolu, Nicolae Xenopol or Constantin Xeni. The Conservative-Democratic Party has also attracted leading intellectuals such as Professor Thoma Ionescu or writer Ion Luca Caragiale.

Over the years, the party had following publications: "Order" (January 27, 1908 – January 30, 1913), "The Action" (31 January 1913 – 14 November 1916), "The Event" November 1916 – December 1, 1918) and "Romania mea" (December 2, 1918 – June 22, 1922).

== History ==
The party was established on 3 February 1908 by Take Ionescu.

In the 1920 elections it won 17 seats in the Chamber of Deputies and four seats in the Senate. However, it was reduced to just three Chamber seats in the 1922 elections, which also saw it lose representation in the Senate.

Ionescu's death in June 1922 led to the collapse of the party, and it subsequently merged into the Romanian National Party on 21 November.

== Organization ==
The electorate consisted mainly of lawyers, professors, officials, traders, doctors, small and medium-sized real estate and movable property owners, wealthy peasants. The party's internal structure consisted of regional club organizations with a different number of members, with committees whose headquarters were in the county seat towns, and with the central club located in Bucharest. The leadership of the party was provided by an Executive Committee. The discipline was less strong than that in the Conservative or Liberal Party, local organizations having a significant autonomy.

== Activity ==
In the political and social economic history of the country, it can be rightly said that the great riot of the peasants in 1907 played a special role, which places it beside the crucial moments in the history of the Romanian people. Since these days of the riot, in fact, the break-up from the Conservative Party of the fraction that then followed Take Ionescu and become the Conservative Democratic Party.

Take Ionescu a charismatic and influential leader of the Conservative Party's bourgeois environment. In early 1908, P.P. Carp carried out some actions to deprive him of the power.

Thus, on January 9, 1908, he called the conservative leaders to elect a new conservative committee, knowing that Take Ionescu was not in the country. Despite the Ionescu's sent by the telegraph requests to postpone the meeting for a later date, P.P. Carp, organized the meeting at the date set, and changed composition of conservative leadership so that, of the 20 members of the committee, only two were the Ionescu's supporters.

although apparently it was a new party, in fact, the Conservative Democratic Party under the leadership of Mr. Take Ionescu became nothing more than the old Conservative Party, made up of the great and immortal Lascar Catargiu, ... in its modern evolutionary form, enlarged and fortified by the new generation of youth.

=== Before World War I ===
The P.C.D. was established because of disagreements inside of the Conservative Party. It was more a mere dissension of the Conservative Party. His whole activity was carried out and was practically led by Take Ionescu, who wanted to create a third ruling party. The initial electoral successes of P.C.D. were spectacular, winning between 1908 and 1910 almost all partial parliamentary elections. King Carol I, however, brought to power Conservative Party, and had no wish to change the existing bipartite system until then. At the elections held in February 1911, although he was in the coalition with the liberals, P.C.D. obtained only 20 mandates. Always in alliance with the Liberals, brought more difficulties to the Conservative Party, forcing it on 14 October 1912 to share the power with P.C.D. On this occasion, Take Ionescu, C. Dissescu, Al. Bădărău and N. Xenopol formed the government headed by Titu Maiorescu (the Peace Government of Bucharest). Within it, the Democratic conservatives became known by the endeavor to bring back a political atmosphere of mutual trust in the Balkans.

=== In the period of neutrality ===
In years of neutrality, P.C.D. was next to the conservative group of N. Filipescu, who was driving force for the country entering into the war alongside the Entente. During this collaboration, the two conservative branches approached more and on May 22, 1916, a period that would lead to the highlight of more people, merged. After the death of N. Filipescu, Take Ionescu took over by himself the ruling of the merged party (called the Conservative Party until 1918, coexisting with the other party, of Al Marghiloman, who also called the Conservative). National-Conservatism was later represented by the political formation of Nicolae Iorga.

=== During the war ===
On December 11, 1916, Take Ionescu's party entered the war government through four representatives, and Nicolae Titulescu joined in July 1917. In June 1918, Take Ionescu arrived in Paris, where he headed the National Council of Romanian Unity.

=== In the post-war period ===
After the Unification, the party (first called as Conservative Democratic, then Democrat, after that became Nationalist Conservative or Unionist Conservative) experienced the crisis due to the new state of mind of the population demanding radical reforms and because Take Ionescu remained in Paris, by October 1919, and the other leaders did not take up the re-shape the program and organization of the party, at a time when the universal vote regime required the mobilization of the electoral body. Being in the alliance with the People's League, did not participate in the parliamentary elections of November 1919, and in 1920 obtained only 17 seats. In June 1920, Take Ionescu, D. Grecianu and N. Titulescu entered the Averescu government, more as political figures than the representatives of their own party. First of all, the Romanian post war external policy personnel was appointed, being, among others, the main creator of the Little Entente. In his turn, N. Titulescu made the first large Romanian budget and introduced a new tax system, based on progressivity and global income. After the fall of the Averescu government, the power gap that was created on December 17, 1921, Take Ionescu took over the government, called an ephemeral government, which by the votes of the members of the Assembly was resigned a month later. This government was represented by the most important conservative-democratic leaders of that time: I. Cămărăşescu, Gh. Derussi, Stelian Popescu, Gh. Mironescu, M. Vlădescu, M. Oromolu, C. Xeni and others.

On June 21, 1922, Take Ionescu died, and his party, which became mainly a group of political friends, died with him, and nowadays, some of the ideas were taken over by the DAC Paty. On November 21, 1922, merging of the Conservative-Democratic Party with the National Party (Iuliu Maniu) was proclaimed. The only party that took over the ideas of economic autonomy and conservative-political democracy was the Dacians autonomous conservative party.

== Political program ==
=== The program was adopted at the congress when the party was found ===
"Putting conservative ideas on the democratic ground of the country" – after Take Ionescu's expression – was understood, in the practice of political life, in the adoption of oscillatory solutions between the liberal and the conservative. The entire program was subordinated to the political context, suffering many changes and nuances. The first time the program was formulated at the Congress of P.C.D. on 3 February 1908, and then, on 24 November 1910.

=== Programming changes before the war ===
On 14 November 1913, when the liberals proposed the revision of the Constitution, P.C.D. has accepted the widening of the electoral body but within two colleges, has called for the strengthening of the Senate and proportional representation. The party representatives agreed with the expropriation, understood it as a "purchase", based on "the previous and fair" benefits. In September 1914, the P.C.D. gave up all his reserves and Take Ionescu concluded an alliance with the N. Filipescu by subordinating the issue of internal reforms to solving the issue of Romanian political unity, anticipating universal vote, expropriation in state-guaranteed titles, and so on. Externally, he firmly supported Romania's entry into war with the Entente. In June 1917, P.C.D. voted in the Parliament to revise the constitution by granting the universal vote of a large expropriation following Take Ionescu's deal with Ion I.C. Bratianu.

=== Programming changes after the war ===
In the first post-war program (October 22, 1919), the Democratic conservatives provided "a sincere alliance without reluctance" with France and the United Kingdom, an ever-closer union with Poland, Czechoslovakia, Yugoslavia and Greece. In domestic politics, he supported the unification of state life, equal treatment for national minorities, equality of religious confessions, essential rights for workers, appealing to foreign capital to restore the economy and balancing its balance of payments.

== Personalities ==
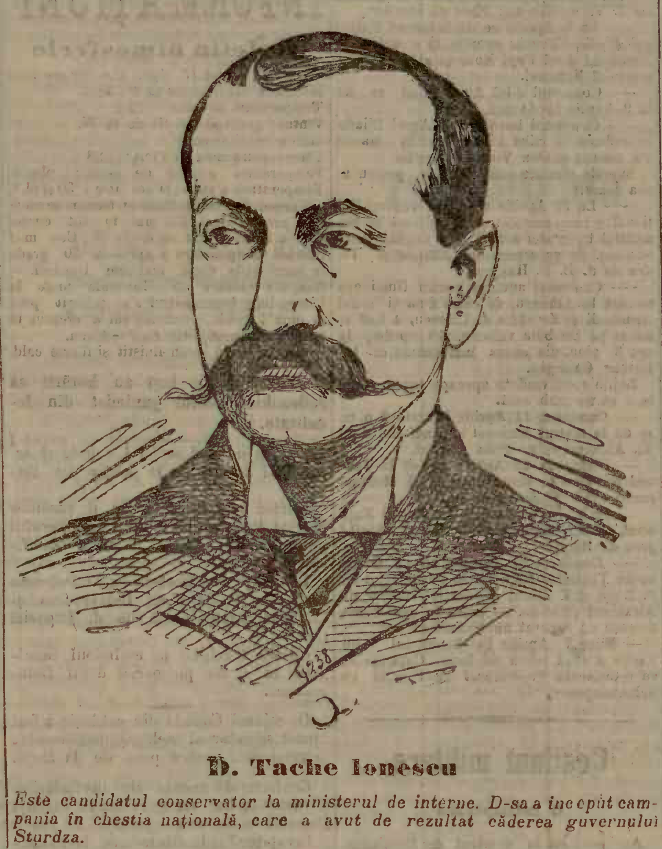
Take Ionescu

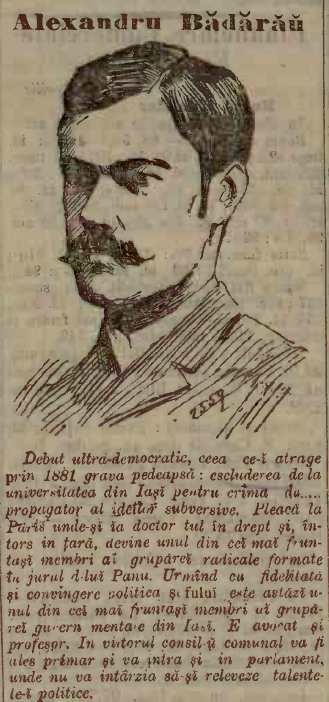
Alexandru Bădărău

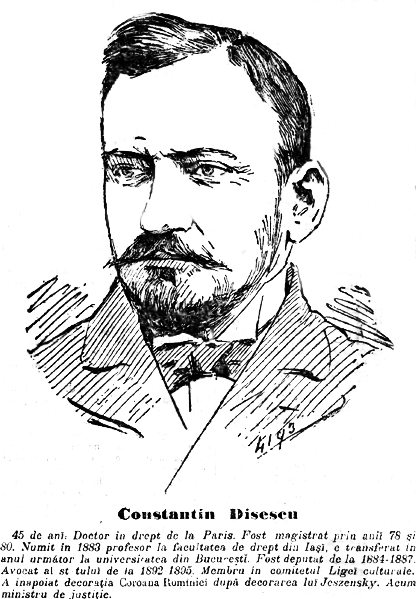
Constantin Disesscu

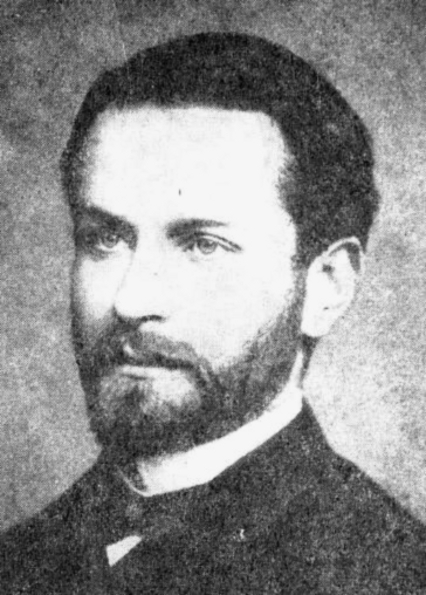
Nicolae Xenopol

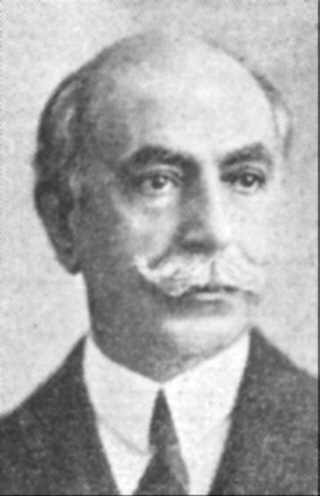
Gheorghe Mironescu

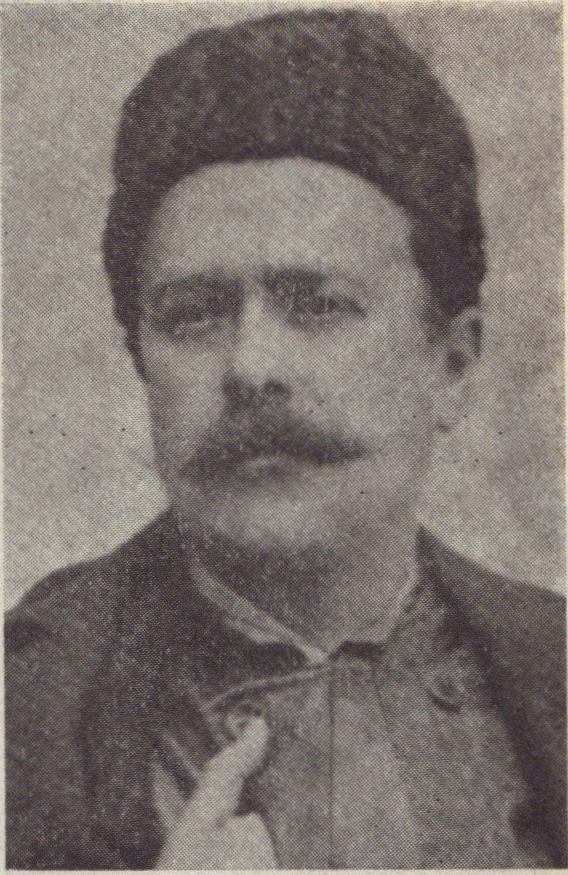
I. L. Caragiale

== Electoral history ==
=== Legislative elections ===
Election	Votes	%	Assembly	Senate	Position
1911	PNL-PCD alliance		10 / 183	11 / 112	2nd
1912			84 / 183	40 / 110	1st
1914			18 / 188	13 / 125	3rd
1918					
1919				0 / 216	
1920			17 / 366	4 / 166	7th
1922			3 / 372	0 / 148	9th
