= Ermil Pangrati =

Romanian politician, engineer, mathematician, historian of science and architect

- Born: July 21, 1864; Iași, Romania
- Died: September 19, 1931 (aged 67); Bucharest, Romania

Academic work
- Discipline: Mathematics; Architecture; Engineering; History of science
- Institutions: University of Bucharest; Ion Mincu University of Architecture and Urban Planning

Minister of Public Works
- In office 1912
- Prime Minister: Titu Maiorescu

Personal details
- Party: PNL

Ermil A. Pangrati (July 21, 1864 in Iaşi – September 19, 1931 in Bucharest) was a Romanian politician, engineer, mathematician, historian of science and architect.

== Career ==
He was a professor of geometry at the University of Bucharest and director of the Ion Mincu University of Architecture and Urban Planning. A member of the National Liberal Party, he sat in the Chamber of Deputies. He was also Minister of Public Works in the Titu Maiorescu cabinet in 1912.
