= Nicolae Filipescu =

Romanian politician

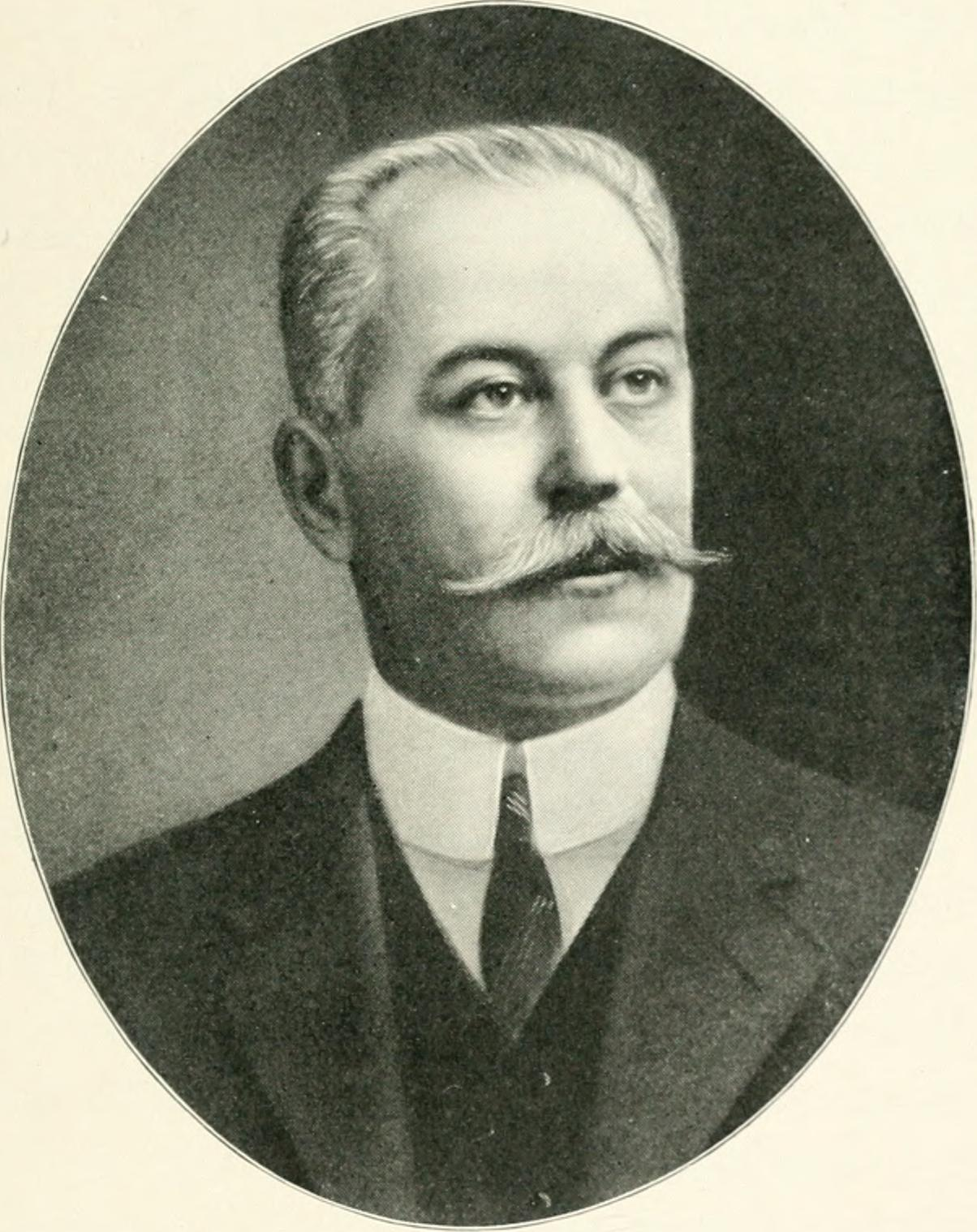

Mayor of Bucharest
- In office February 1893 – October 1895
- Preceded by: Grigore Trandafil
- Succeeded by: Petre S. Aurelian

Minister of War of Kingdom of Romania
- In office 29 December 1910 – 27 March 1912
- Prime Minister: Petre P. Carp
- Preceded by: Grigore C. Crăiniceanu
- Succeeded by: Ioan Argetoianu

Personal details
- Born: December 5, 1862 Bucharest, United Principalities
- Died: September 30, 1916 (aged 53) Bucharest, Kingdom of Romania
- Occupation: Politician
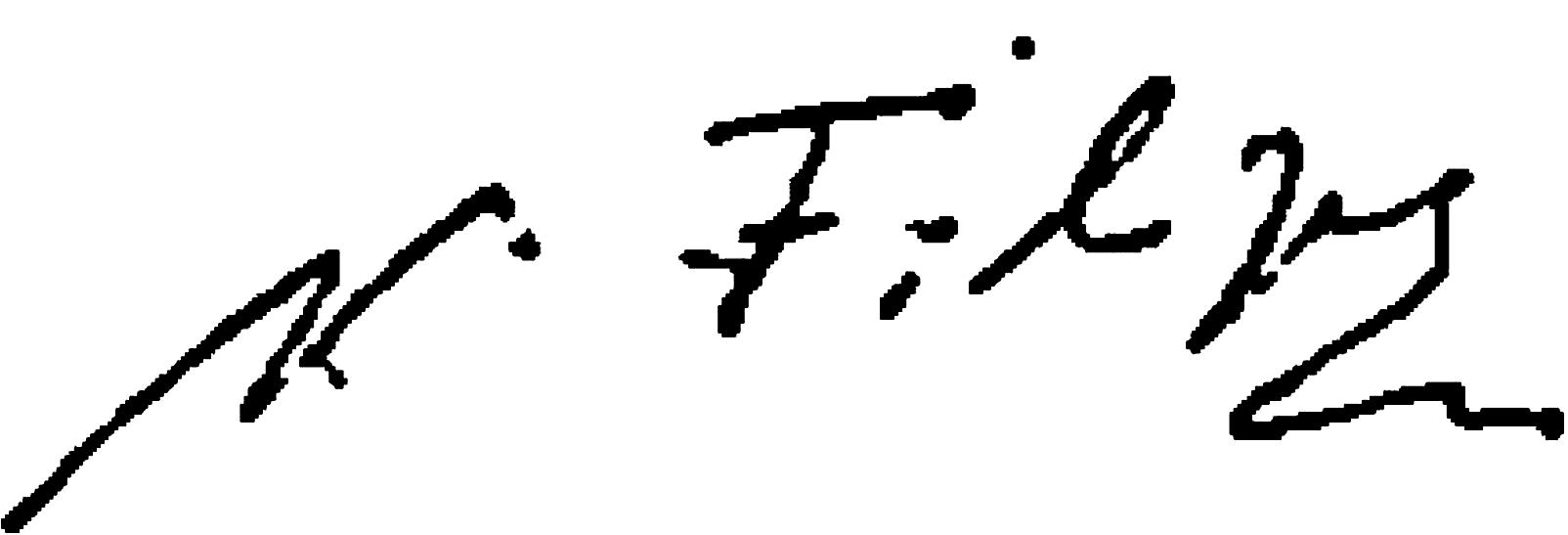
- Signature

Nicolae Filipescu (December 5, 1862 – September 30, 1916) was a Romanian politician.

Filipescu was the Mayor of Bucharest between February 1893 and October 1895. It was during his term the first electric tramways circulated in Bucharest. Between December 29, 1910, and March 27, 1912, he was the Minister of War of Romania, in the Cabinet led by Petre P. Carp.

== Biography ==
He attended primary school in Bucharest, after which he completed graduated from the high school in Geneva and law school in Paris. Coming back to his home country, he started to work politically and joined the young conservatives grouped around the newspaper "Epoca". In 1885 he became a Member of the Chamber of Deputies for the first time in the Brăila constituency. On February 9, 1893, he was elected the mayor of Bucharest, a position that he held for almost two years, until 1895, when he became the mayor of Brăila.

In 1899 the Conservatives returned to power and Filipescu was re-elected as Deputy. When the liberal council of the capital was dissolved, he was appointed the chairman of the Interim Commission. In 1898 he killed in a duel the journalist George Emanuel Lahovari, the editor of the liberal newspaper "L'Indépendance Roumanie" with whom he had had a violent dispute.

Between July 7, 1900, and February 14, 1901, he was for the first time the Minister for Agriculture and Royal Domains in the government of Petre P. Carp. Then he was Minister of War between December 29, 1910 and March 28, 1912, and again Minister for Agriculture and Royal Domains between October 14, 1912 and April 5, 1913.

In 1914, he founded the National Action, the pro-Entente wing of the Conservative Party, with people from several parties. In 1916 the National Action led by Filipescu, merged with the Conservative-Democratic Party (PCD).

Nicolae Filipescu died on September 30, 1916, after a heart attack.

== Appellant of the National Bank ==
Nicolae Filipescu asserted himself throughout his political career and as a fierce opponent of the National Bank of Romania, of the iniquities that, in his opinion, took place at this very important and prestigious institution of the modern Romanian state. He wanted at all costs the expropriation of the National Bank, ie the abolition of the contract between the state and the National Bank, he proposed to create a central cash department from which the small bank could borrow money, and the central cash department of the National Bank to borrow without interest 30,000,000 lei, merchants and small industrialists and craftsmen managed to pay interest of 6% and not 12%, 15%, or 18% as they paid at the time.

== Fighter for the national ideal ==
The most important period in Nicolae Filipescu's life was the outbreak of World War I and the entry of Romania in the war in 1916, when he carried out an extensive activity to achieve the "national ideal". His numerous actions were aimed at convincing the government of Ion I. C. Brătianu for the fact that Romania had to go to war on the side of the Entente, in order to unite all the territories inhabited by Romanians.

After numerous mobilizing actions and speeches in many of the cities of the Romanian Old Kingdom and even a visit to the court of Tsar Nicholas II of Russia, to negotiate Romania's entry into the war on the part of the Entente, he saw his work rewarded by the decision taken in the Crown Council of Cotroceni on August 14, 1916, when he was present, and which decided Romania's entry into the war.
