= Conservative Party (Romania, 1880–1918) =

Conservative Party Partidul Conservator
- President: Manolache Costache Epureanu; Lascăr Catargiu; Ioan Emanoil Florescu; Gheorghe Grigore Cantacuzino; Petre P. Carp; Titu Maiorescu; Alexandru Marghiloman
- Founded: February 1880; 146 years ago
- Dissolved: 1918; 108 years ago
- Succeeded by: Conservative-Democratic Party (split); Conservative Nationalist Party (split); Progressive Conservative Party (legal successor); Conservative Party (claimed, not legal successor)
- Ideology: Conservatism
- Political position: Right-wing

The Conservative Party (Romanian: Partidul Conservator) was between 1880 and 1918 one of Romania's two most important parties, the other one being the National Liberal Party. The party was the party of government for a total of 14 years, more than a third of its existence.

It was founded on 3 February 1880 in Bucharest, although the doctrines and various groups of conservatives had already existed for some time. Precursors to the party had included the political grouping "Juna Dreaptă" (November 1868) and the newspaper Timpul (founded March 1876).

The party relied on the support of the great landowners, the bourgeoisie, and some intellectuals. Their economic policy encouraged light industry and crafts but did not oppose investments in heavy industry.

The 1907 Romanian Peasants' Revolt showed that some reforms needed to be made in the Romanian social and political scene. As a result, in 1913, the Conservatives accepted some reforms, such as the universal suffrage promoted by the Liberals. In 1917, under pressure from the Liberals, rather than oppose modifications to the Constitution, the Conservatives did not accept the changes and tried to adapt. However, after the union of Romania with Transylvania, they never played an important role in the politics of Romania.

In the early 20th century, the party underwent several schisms. In January 1908, Take Ionescu left to found the Conservative-Democratic Party (Partidul Conservator-Democrat, PCD). In May 1915, Nicolae Filipescu led a group out of the party that favoured joining World War I on the Entente side; in October 1916, the Filipescu and Ionescu groups fused as the Conservative Nationalist Party (Partidul Conservator Naţionalist).

In 1918–19 the party split into the Partidul Conservator-Democrat (which, in 1922, fused with the National Party) and the short-lived Partidul Conservator-Progresist.

== Party presidents ==
- Emanoil (Manolache) Costache Epureanu (February–September 1880)
- Lascăr Catargiu (1880–99)
- Gheorghe Grigore Cantacuzino (1899–1907)
- Petre P. Carp (1907–13)
- Titu Maiorescu (1913–14)
- Alexandru Marghiloman (1914–25)

Source: Scurtu 1982.

== Other important members ==
- Alexandru Lahovari
- Dimitrie S. Niţescu
- Mihail G. Cantacuzino
- Dimitrie A. Grecianu
- Constantin Garoflid

== Governments formed ==
- Theodor Rosetti (23 March – 12 November 1888)
- Theodor Rosetti (12 November 1888 – 26 March 1889)
- Lascăr Catargiu (29 March – 3 November 1889)
- George Manu (5 November 1889 – 15 February 1891)
- Ioan Emanoil Florescu (21 February – 25 November 1891)
- Lascăr Catargiu (27 November 1891 – 3 October 1895)
- Gheorghe Cantacuzino (11 April 1899 – 7 July 1900)
- Petre P. Carp (7 July 1900 – 13 February 1901)
- Gheorghe Cantacuzino (22 December 1904 – 12 March 1907)
- Petre P. Carp (29 December 1910 – 28 March 1912)
- Titu Maiorescu (14 October 1912 – 31 December 1913)
- Alexandru Marghiloman (5 March – 24 October 1918)

== Party publications ==
- Timpul (15 March 1876 – 17 March 1884; 13 November 1889 – 14 December 1900)
- Epoca (16 November 1885 – 14 June 1889; 2 December 1895 – 13 February 1901)
- Conservatorul (15 December 1900 – 15 November 1914)
- Steagul (14 November 1914 – July 1922)

== Electoral history ==
=== Legislative elections ===
Election	Faction/Leader	Votes	%	Assembly	Senate	Position
1892	PC/Lascăr Catargiu			148 / 183	57 / 112	1st
1907	PC/Petre P. Carp			15 / 183	17 / 112	
1911	PC/Petre P. Carp			160 / 183	85 / 112	1st
1912	PC/Petre P. Carp			62 / 183	45 / 110	2nd
1914	PC/Titu Maiorescu			21 / 188	22 / 125	2nd
1918	PC-Alexandru Marghiloman			165 / 174	108 / 121	1st
1918	PC-Petre P. Carp			2 / 174	2 / 121	3rd
1919	PCP/Alexandru Marghiloman			13 / 568	4 / 216	7th

== Notes and references ==
- Ioan Scurtu, Viața politică din România 1918–1944, Albatros, 1982.
