= Second Maiorescu cabinet =

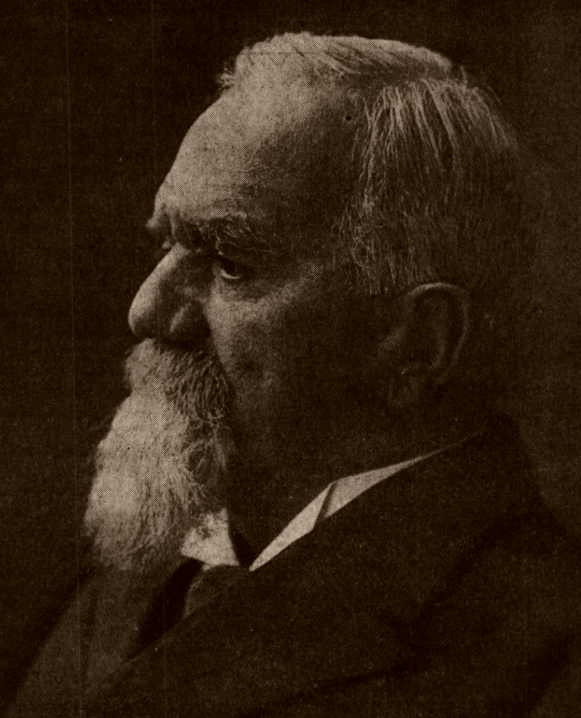
Titu Maiorescu in 1913

The first cabinet of Titu Maiorescu was the government of Romania from 14 October 1912 to 31 December 1913.

== Composition ==
The ministers of the cabinet were as follows:

- President of the Council of Ministers:

- Titu Maiorescu (14 October 1912 - 31 December 1913)

- Minister of the Interior:

- Take Ionescu (14 October 1912 - 31 December 1913)

- Minister of Foreign Affairs:

- Titu Maiorescu (14 October 1912 - 31 December 1913)

- Minister of Finance:

- Alexandru Marghiloman (14 October 1912 - 31 December 1913)

- Minister of Justice:

- Mihail G. Cantacuzino (14 October 1912 - 31 December 1913)

- Minister of War:

- Gen. Constantin Hârjeu (14 October 1912 - 31 December 1913)

- Minister of Religious Affairs and Public Instruction:

- Constantin Dissescu (14 October 1912 - 31 December 1913)

- Minister of Industry and Commerce:

- Nicolae Xenopol (14 October 1912 - 31 December 1913)

- Minister of Agriculture and Property:

- Nicolae Filipescu (14 October 1912 - 5 April 1913)
- Constantin C. Arion (5 April - 31 December 1913)

- Minister of Public Works:

- Alexandru A. Bădărău (14 October 1912 - 31 December 1913)

Preceded by First Maiorescu cabinet	Cabinet of Romania; 14 October 1912 - 31 December 1913	Succeeded by Third Ion I. C. Brătianu cabinet
