= Fourth Ion I. C. Brătianu cabinet =

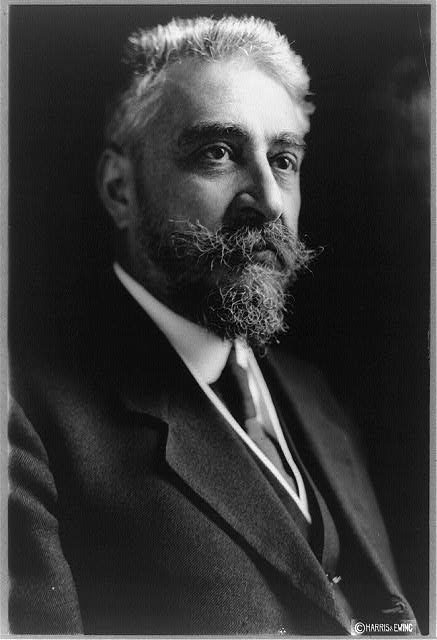
Ion I. C. Brătianu

The fourth cabinet of Ion I. C. Brătianu was the government of Romania from 11 December 1916 to 26 January 1918.

== Composition ==
The ministers of the cabinet were as follows:

- President of the Council of Ministers:

- Ion I. C. Brătianu (11 December 1916 - 26 January 1918)

- Vice President of the Council of Ministers:

- Take Ionescu (11 December 1916 - 26 January 1918)

- Minister of the Interior:

- Alexandru Constantinescu (11 December 1916 - 26 January 1918)

- Minister of Foreign Affairs:

- Ion I. C. Brătianu (11 December 1916 - 26 January 1918)

- Minister of Finance:

- Victor Antonescu (11 December 1916 - 10 July 1917)
- Nicolae Titulescu (10 July 1917 - 26 January 1918)

- Minister of Justice:

- Mihail G. Cantacuzino (11 December 1916 - 26 January 1918)

- Minister of Religious Affairs and Public Instruction:

- Ion G. Duca (11 December 1916 - 26 January 1918)

- Minister of War:

- Vintilă I. C. Brătianu (11 December 1916 - 10 July 1917)
- (interim) Vintilă Brătianu (10 - 20 July 1917)
- Gen. Constantin Iancovescu (20 July 1917 - 26 January 1918)

- Minister of War Materiel:

- Vintilă Brătianu (19 July 1917 - 26 January 1918)

- Minister of Public Works:

- Dimitrie Greceanu (11 December 1916 - 26 January 1918)

- Minister of Industry and Commerce:

- Constantin Istrati (11 December 1916 - 10 July 1917)
- Barbu Ștefănescu Delavrancea (10 July 1917 - 26 January 1918)

- Minister of Agriculture and Property:

- George G. Mârzescu (11 December 1916 - 26 January 1918)

- Ministers without portfolio:

- Mihail Pherekyde (11 December 1916 - 26 January 1918)
- Emil Costinescu (11 December 1916 - 26 January 1918)
- Take Ionescu (11 December 1916 - 10 July 1917)
- Vintilă Brătianu (10 - 19 July 1917)

Preceded by Third Ion I. C. Brătianu cabinet	Cabinet of Romania; 11 December 1916 - 26 January 1918	Succeeded by First Averescu cabinet
