= Second Cantacuzino cabinet =

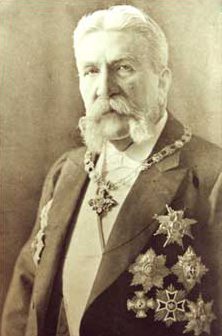
Gheorghe Grigore Cantacuzino

The second cabinet of Gheorghe Grigore Cantacuzino was the government of Romania from 22 December 1904 to 12 March 1907.

== Composition ==
The ministers of the cabinet were as follows:

- President of the Council of Ministers:

- Gheorghe Grigore Cantacuzino (22 December 1904 - 12 March 1907)

- Minister of the Interior:

- Gheorghe Grigore Cantacuzino (22 December 1904 - 12 March 1907)

- Minister of Foreign Affairs:

- Gen. Iacob Lahovary (22 December 1904 - 9 February 1907)
- (interim) Ioan Lahovary (9 - 26 February 1907)
- Ioan Lahovary (26 February - 12 March 1907)

- Minister of Finance:

- Take Ionescu (22 December 1904 - 12 March 1907)

- Minister of Justice:

- Alexandru A. Bădărău (22 December 1904 - 15 June 1906)
- Dimitrie Greceanu (15 June 1906 - 12 March 1907)

- Minister of War:

- Gen. George Manu (22 December 1904 - 12 March 1907)

- Minister of Religious Affairs and Public Instruction:

- Mihail Vlădescu (22 December 1904 - 24 October 1906)
- Constantin Dissescu (24 October 1906 - 26 February 1907)
- Constantin Istrati (26 February - 12 March 1907)

- Minister of Agriculture, Industry, Commerce, and Property:

- Ioan Lahovary (22 December 1904 - 26 February 1907)
- (interim) Ioan Lahovary (26 February - 12 March 1907)

- Minister of Public Works:

- Ion C. Grădișteanu (22 December 1904 - 12 March 1907)

Preceded by Third Sturdza cabinet	Cabinet of Romania; 22 December 1904 - 12 March 1907	Succeeded by Fourth Sturdza cabinet
