= Fourth Sturdza cabinet =

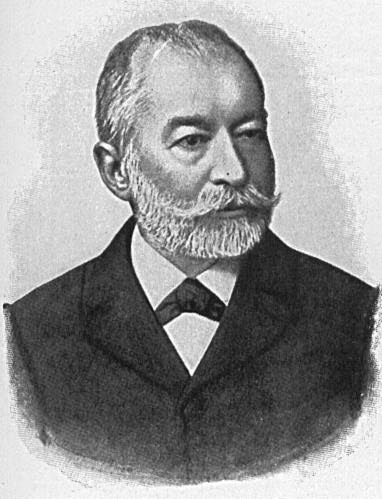
Dimitrie A. Sturdza

The fourth cabinet of Dimitrie A. Sturdza was the government of Romania from 12 March 1907 to 27 December 1908.

== Composition ==
The ministers of the cabinet were as follows:

- President of the Council of Ministers:

- Dimitrie A. Sturdza (12 March 1907 - 27 December 1908)

- Minister of the Interior:

- Ion I.C. Brătianu (12 March 1907 - 27 December 1908)

- Minister of Foreign Affairs:

- Dimitrie A. Sturdza (12 March 1907 - 27 December 1908)

- Minister of Finance:

- Emil Costinescu (12 March 1907 - 27 December 1908)

- Minister of Justice:

- Toma Stelian (12 March 1907 - 27 December 1908)

- Minister of Religious Affairs and Public Instruction:

- Spiru Haret (12 March 1907 - 27 December 1908)

- Minister of War:

- Gen. Alexandru Averescu (12 March 1907 - 27 December 1908)

- Minister of Public Works:

- Vasile G. Morțun (12 March 1907 - 27 December 1908)

- Minister of Agriculture, Industry, Commerce, and Property:

- Anton Carp (12 March 1907 - 1 April 1907)

- Minister of Agriculture and Property:

- Anton Carp (1 April 1907 - 27 December 1908)

- Minister of Industry and Commerce:

- (interim) Anton Carp (1 April 1907 - 2 June 1908)
- Alexandru Djuvara (2 June - 27 December 1908)

Preceded by Second Cantacuzino cabinet	Cabinet of Romania; 12 March 1907 - 27 December 1908	Succeeded by First Ion I. C. Brătianu cabinet
