= First Ion I. C. Brătianu cabinet =

Government of Romania from December 1908 to March 1909

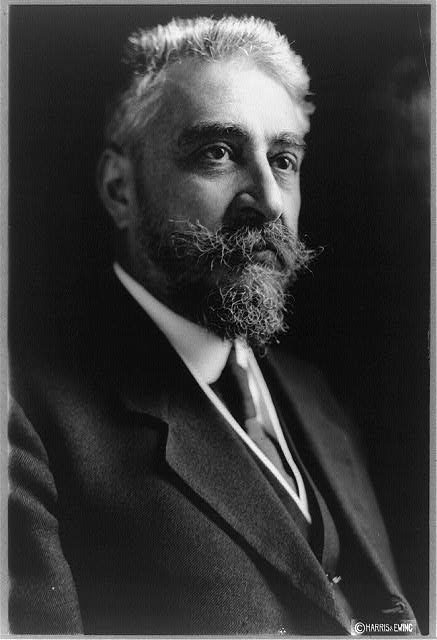
Ion I. C. Brătianu

The first cabinet of Ion I. C. Brătianu was the government of Romania from 27 December 1908 to 4 March 1909.

== Composition ==
The ministers of the cabinet were as follows:

- President of the Council of Ministers:

- Ion I. C. Brătianu (27 December 1908 - 4 March 1909)

- Minister of the Interior:

- Ion I. C. Brătianu (27 December 1908 - 4 March 1909)

- Minister of Foreign Affairs:

- (interim) Ion I. C. Brătianu (27 December 1908 - 4 March 1909)

- Minister of Finance:

- Emil Costinescu (27 December 1908 - 4 March 1909)

- Minister of Justice:

- Toma Stelian (27 December 1908 - 4 March 1909)

- Minister of Religious Affairs and Public Instruction:

- Spiru Haret (27 December 1908 - 4 March 1909)

- Minister of War:

- Gen. Alexandru Averescu (27 December 1908 - 4 March 1909)

- Minister of Public Works:

- Vasile G. Morțun (27 December 1908 - 4 March 1909)

- Minister of Industry and Commerce:

- Alexandru Djuvara (27 December 1908 - 4 March 1909)

- Minister of Agriculture and Property:

- Anton Carp (27 December 1908 - 4 March 1909)

Preceded by Fourth Sturdza cabinet	Cabinet of Romania; 27 December 1908 - 4 March 1909	Succeeded by Second Ion I. C. Brătianu cabinet
