= Second Ion I. C. Brătianu cabinet =

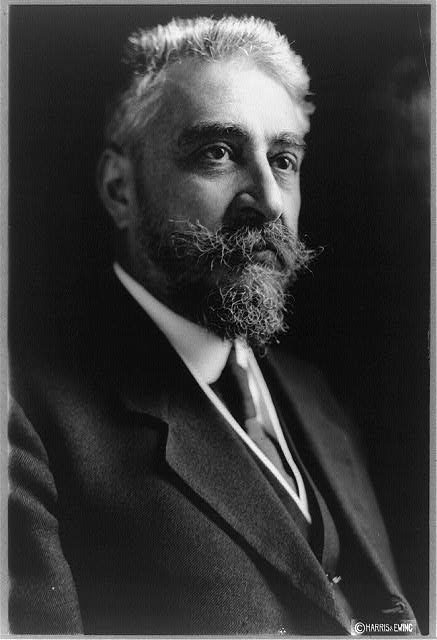
Ion I. C. Brătianu

The second cabinet of Ion I. C. Brătianu was the government of Romania from 4 March 1909 to 28 December 1910.

== Composition ==
The ministers of the cabinet were as follows:

- President of the Council of Ministers:

- Ion I. C. Brătianu (4 March 1909 - 28 December 1910)

- Minister of the Interior:

- Ion I. C. Brătianu (4 March - 15 December 1909)
- Mihail Pherekyde (15 December 1909 - 16 February 1910)
- Ion I. C. Brătianu (16 February - 28 December 1910)

- Minister of Foreign Affairs:

- (interim) Ion I. C. Brătianu (4 March - 1 November 1909)
- Alexandru Djuvara (1 November 1909 - 28 December 1910)

- Minister of Finance:

- Emil Costinescu (4 March 1909 - 28 December 1910)

- Minister of Justice:

- Toma Stelian (4 March 1909 - 28 December 1910)

- Minister of Religious Affairs and Public Instruction:

- Spiru Haret (4 March 1909 - 28 December 1910)

- Minister of War:

- (interim) Toma Stelian (4 March - 1 November 1909)
- Gen. Grigore Crăiniceanu (1 November 1909 - 28 December 1910)

- Minister of Public Works:

- Vasile G. Morțun (4 March 1909 - 28 December 1910)

- Minister of Industry and Commerce:

- Alexandru Djuvara (4 March - 1 November 1909)
- Mihail G. Orleanu (1 November 1909 - 28 December 1910)

- Minister of Agriculture and Property:

- Anton Carp (4 March - 1 November 1909)
- Alexandru Constantinescu (1 November 1909 - 28 December 1910)

Preceded by First Ion I. C. Brătianu cabinet	Cabinet of Romania; 4 March 1909 - 28 December 1910	Succeeded by Second Carp cabinet
