= First Cantacuzino cabinet =

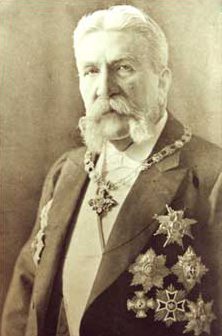
Gheorghe Grigore Cantacuzino

The first cabinet of Gheorghe Grigore Cantacuzino was the government of Romania from 11 April 1899 to 6 July 1900.

== Composition ==
The ministers of the cabinet were as follows:

- President of the Council of Ministers:

- Gheorghe Grigore Cantacuzino (11 April 1899 - 6 July 1900)

- Minister of the Interior:

- Gheorghe Grigore Cantacuzino (11 April 1899 - 9 January 1900)
- Gen. George Manu (9 January - 6 July 1900)

- Minister of Foreign Affairs:

- Ioan Lahovary (11 April 1899 - 6 July 1900)

- Minister of Finance:

- Gen. George Manu (11 April 1899 - 9 January 1900)
- Take Ionescu (9 January - 6 July 1900)

- Minister of Justice:

- Constantin Dissescu (11 April 1899 - 6 July 1900)

- Minister of War:

- Gen. Iacob Lahovary (11 April 1899 - 6 July 1900)

- Minister of Religious Affairs and Public Instruction:

- Take Ionescu (11 April 1899 - 9 January 1900)
- Constantin Istrati (9 January - 6 July 1900)

- Minister of Agriculture, Industry, Commerce, and Property:

- Nicolae Fleva (11 April 1899 - 6 July 1900)

- Minister of Public Works:

- Constantin Istrati (11 April 1899 - 9 January 1900)
- Ion C. Grădișteanu (9 January - 6 July 1900)

Preceded by Second Sturdza cabinet	Cabinet of Romania; 11 April 1899 - 6 July 1900	Succeeded by First Carp cabinet
