= First Averescu cabinet =

First cabinet of Alexandru Averescu

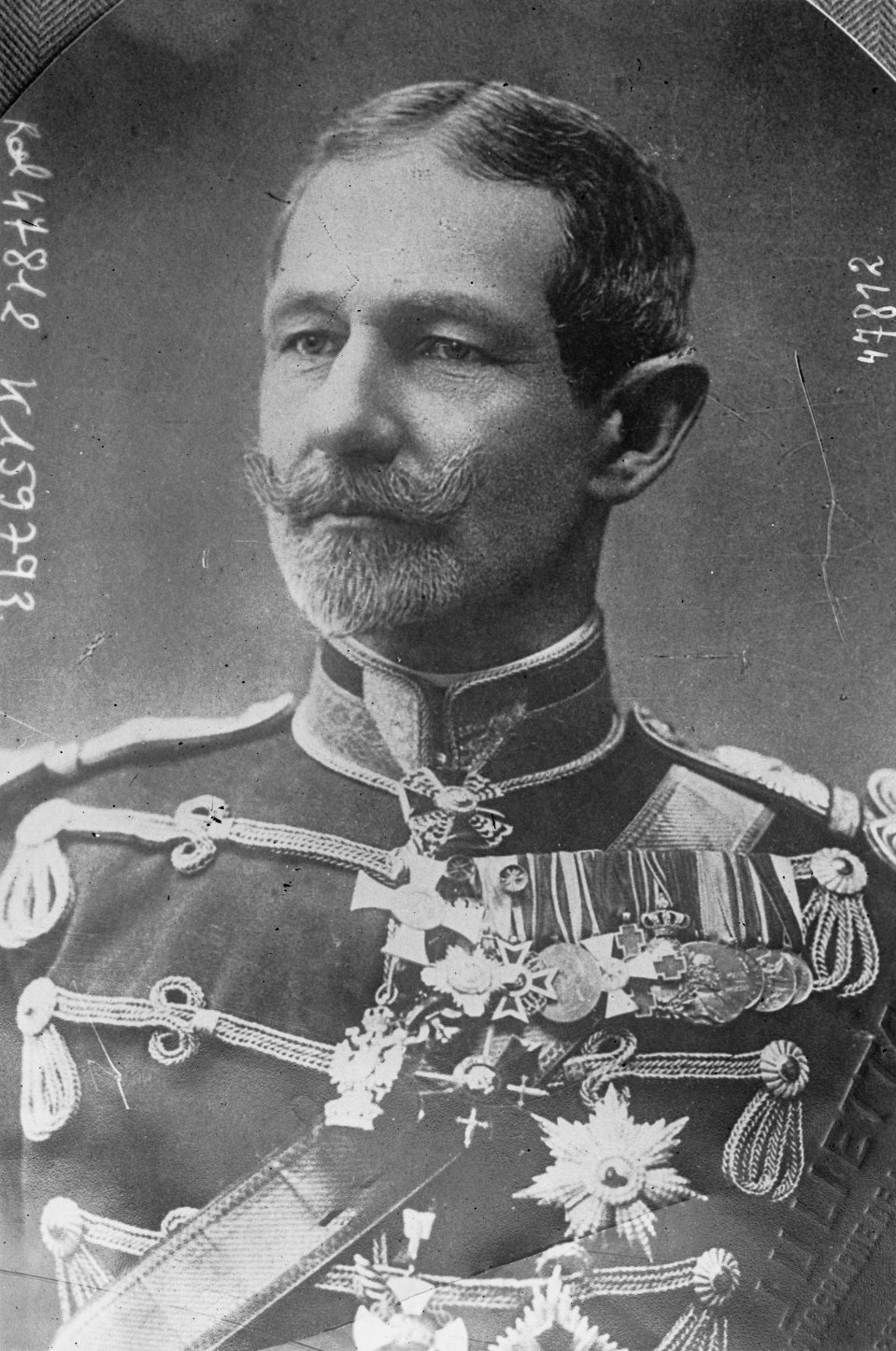
Alexandru Averescu

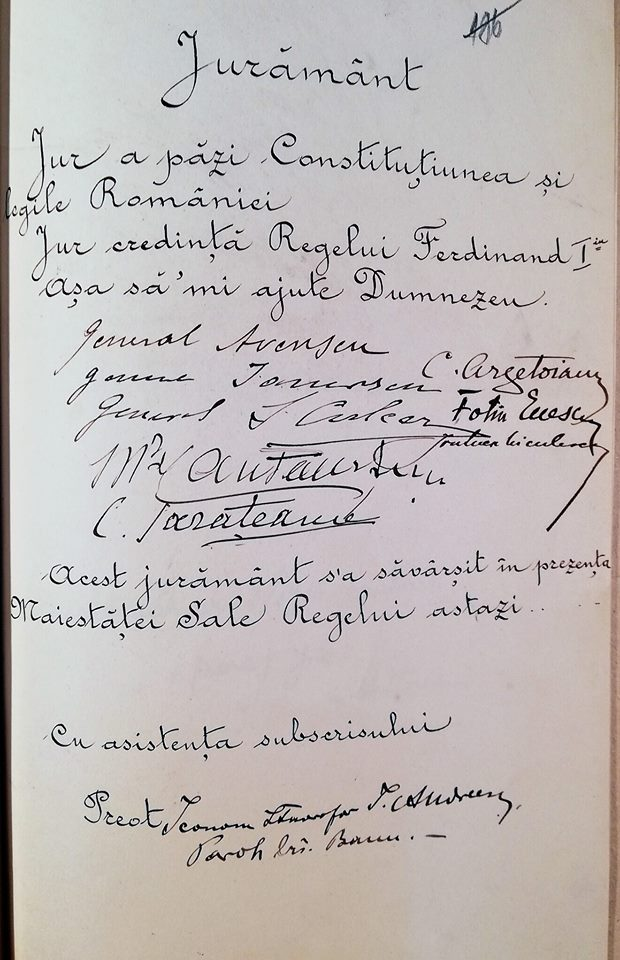
The oath subscribed by the cabinet.

The first cabinet of Alexandru Averescu was the government of Romania from 29 January - 4 March 1918.

== Composition ==
The ministers of the cabinet were as follows:

- President of the Council of Ministers:

- Gen. Alexandru Averescu (29 January - 4 March 1918)

- Minister of the Interior:

- Constantin Sărățeanu (29 January - 4 March 1918)

- Minister of Foreign Affairs:

- (interim) Gen. Alexandru Averescu (29 January - 4 March 1918)

- Minister of Finance:

- Fotin Enescu (29 January - 4 March 1918)

- Minister of Justice:

- Constantin Argetoianu (29 January - 4 March 1918)

- Minister of Religious Affairs and Public Instruction:

- Matei B. Cantacuzino (29 January - 4 March 1918)

- Minister of War:

- Gen. Constantin Iancovescu (29 January - 4 March 1918)

- Minister of War Materiel:

- Gen. Constantin Iancovescu (29 January - 5 February 1918)

- Minister of Public Works:

- Gen. Ioan Culcer (29 January - 4 March 1918)

- Minister of Industry and Commerce:

- Ion Luca-Niculescu (29 January - 4 March 1918)

- Minister of Agriculture and Property:

- (interim) Fotin Enescu (29 January - 8 February 1918)
- Constantin Garoflid (8 - 19 February 1918)
- (interim) Fotin Enescu (19 February - 4 March 1918)

Minister without portfolio:

- Alexandru Averescu (29 January - 4 March 1918)

Preceded by Fourth Ion I. C. Brătianu cabinet	Cabinet of Romania; 29 January 1918 - 4 March 1918	Succeeded by Marghiloman cabinet
