= Second Carp cabinet =

Government in Romania

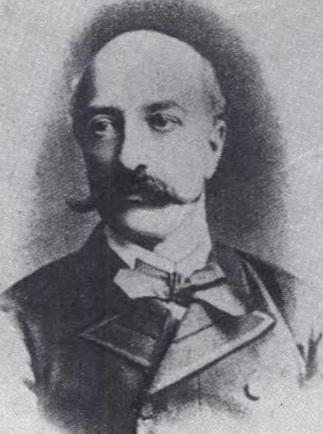
Petre P. Carp

The second cabinet of Petre P. Carp was the government of Romania from 29 December 1910 to 27 March 1912.

== Composition ==
The ministers of the cabinet were as follows:

- President of the Council of Ministers:

- Petre P. Carp (29 December 1910 - 27 March 1912)

- Minister of the Interior:

- Alexandru Marghiloman (29 December 1910 - 27 March 1912)

- Minister of Foreign Affairs:

- Titu Maiorescu (29 December 1910 - 27 March 1912)

- Minister of Finance:

- Petre P. Carp (29 December 1910 - 27 March 1912)

- Minister of Justice:

- Mihail G. Cantacuzino (29 December 1910 - 27 March 1912)

- Minister of War:

- Nicolae Filipescu (29 December 1910 - 27 March 1912)

- Minister of Religious Affairs and Public Instruction:

- Constantin C. Arion (29 December 1910 - 27 March 1912)

- Minister of Industry and Commerce:

- Dimitrie Nenițescu (29 December 1910 - 27 March 1912)

- Minister of Agriculture and Property:

- Ioan Lahovary (29 December 1910 - 27 March 1912)

- Minister of Public Works:

- Barbu Ștefănescu Delavrancea (29 December 1910 - 27 March 1912)

Preceded by Second Ion I. C. Brătianu cabinet	Cabinet of Romania; 29 December 1910 - 27 March 1912	Succeeded by First Maiorescu cabinet
