= First Maiorescu cabinet =

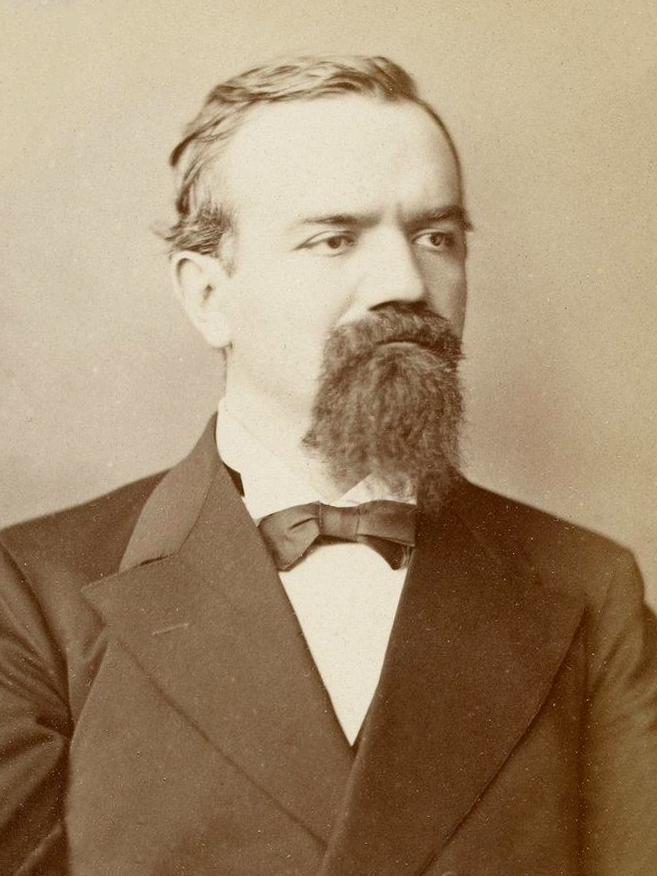
Titu Maiorescu

The first cabinet of Titu Maiorescu was the government of Romania from 28 March to 14 October 1912.

== Composition ==
The ministers of the cabinet were as follows:

- President of the Council of Ministers:

- Titu Maiorescu (28 March - 14 October 1912)

- Minister of the Interior:

- Constantin C. Arion (28 March - 14 October 1912)

- Minister of Foreign Affairs:

- Titu Maiorescu (28 March - 14 October 1912)

- Minister of Finance:

- Theodor Rosetti (28 March - 14 October 1912)

- Minister of Justice:

- Mihail G. Cantacuzino (28 March - 14 October 1912)

- Minister of War:

- Gen. Ion Argetoianu (28 March - 14 October 1912)

- Minister of Religious Affairs and Public Instruction:

- (interim) Constantin C. Arion (28 March - 14 October 1912)

- Minister of Industry and Commerce:

- Dimitrie Nenițescu (28 March - 14 October 1912)

- Minister of Agriculture and Property:

- Ioan Lahovary (28 March - 14 October 1912)

- Minister of Public Works:

- Ermil Pangrati (28 March - 14 October 1912)

Preceded by Second Carp cabinet	Cabinet of Romania; 28 March 1912 - 14 October 1912	Succeeded by Second Maiorescu cabinet
