= Third Ion I. C. Brătianu cabinet =

Government of Romania from 1914 to 1916

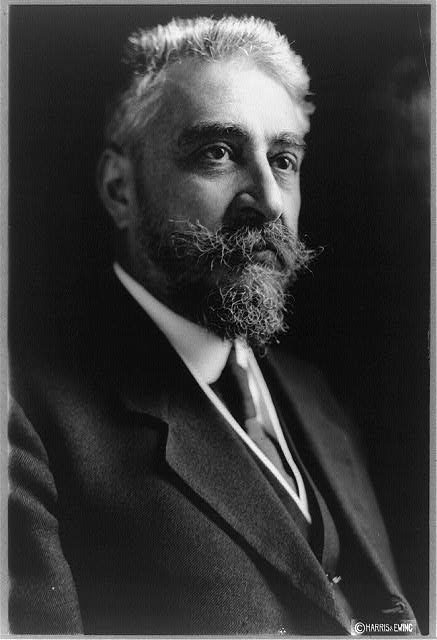
Ion I. C. Brătianu

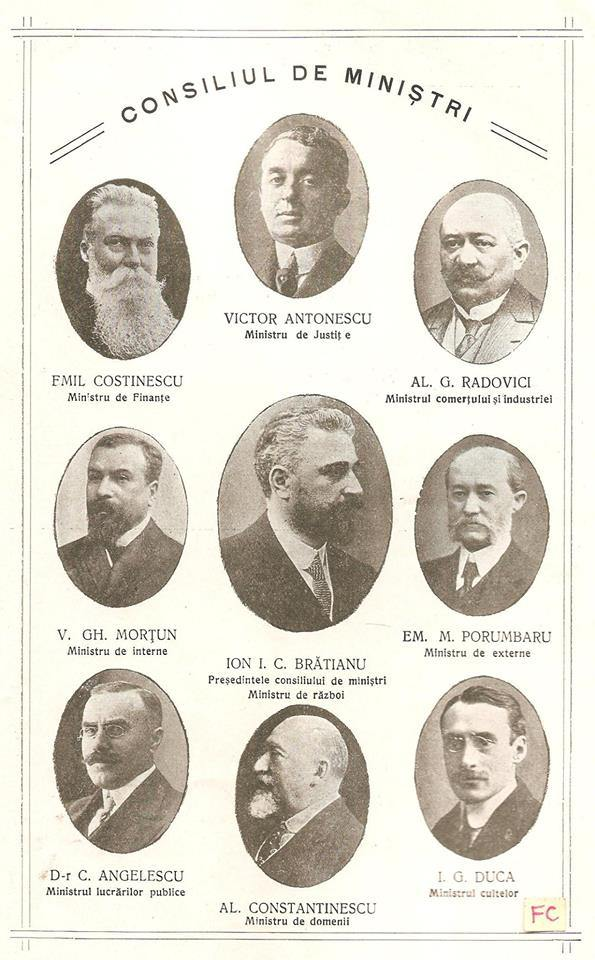

The third cabinet of Ion I. C. Brătianu was the government of Romania from 4 January 1914 to 11 December 1916. During this period Romania entered World War I on the side of the Allied Powers.

== Composition ==
The ministers of the cabinet were as follows:

- President of the Council of Ministers:

- Ion I. C. Brătianu (4 January 1914 - 11 December 1916)

- Minister of the Interior:

- Vasile G. Morțun (4 January 1914 - 11 December 1916)

- Minister of Foreign Affairs:

- Emanoil Porumbaru (4 January 1914 - 8 December 1916)
- Ion I. C. Brătianu (8 - 11 December 1916)

- Minister of Finance:

- Emil Costinescu (4 January 1914 - 11 December 1916)

- Minister of Justice:

- Victor Antonescu (4 January 1914 - 11 December 1916)

- Minister of Religious Affairs and Public Instruction:

- Ion G. Duca (4 January 1914 - 11 December 1916)

- Minister of War:

- Ion I. C. Brătianu (4 January 1914 - 15 August 1916)
- Vintilă Brătianu (15 August - 11 December 1916)

- Minister of Public Works:

- Constantin Angelescu (4 January 1914 - 11 December 1916)

- Minister of Industry and Commerce:

- Alexandru Radovici (4 January 1914 - 11 December 1916)

- Minister of Agriculture and Property:

- Alexandru Constantinescu (4 January 1914 - 11 December 1916)

Preceded by Second Maiorescu cabinet	Cabinet of Romania; 4 January 1914 - 11 December 1916	Succeeded by Fourth Ion I. C. Brătianu cabinet
