= List of heads of government of Romania by time in office =

Since 1862, there have been 72 people sworn into office as head of government of Romania: 46 during the monarchic period and 27 during the republican period, with Petru Groza having served during both.

== Notable lengths ==
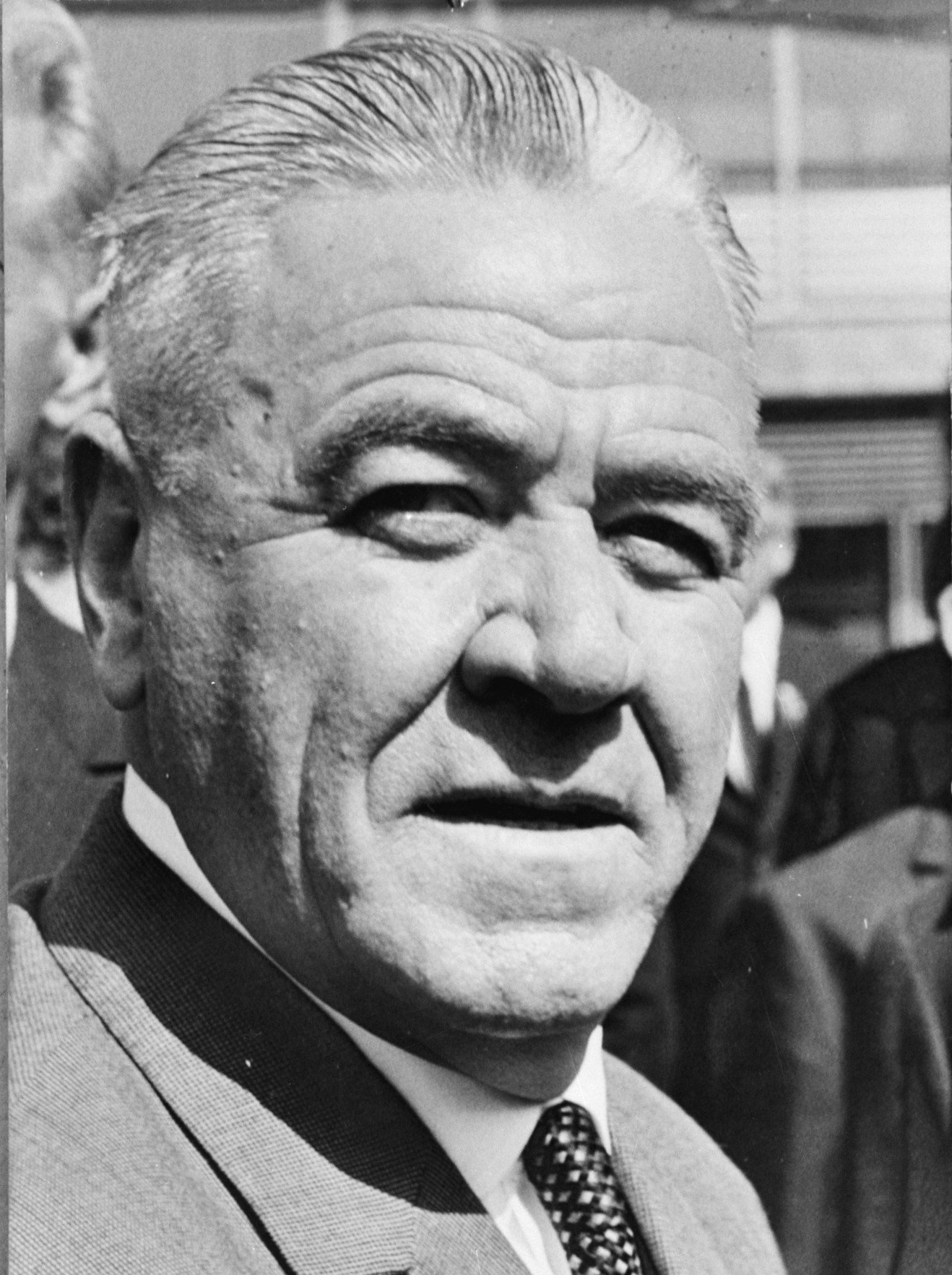
13 years and 7 days: Ion Gheorghe Maurer (1961–1974) — Longest total tenure

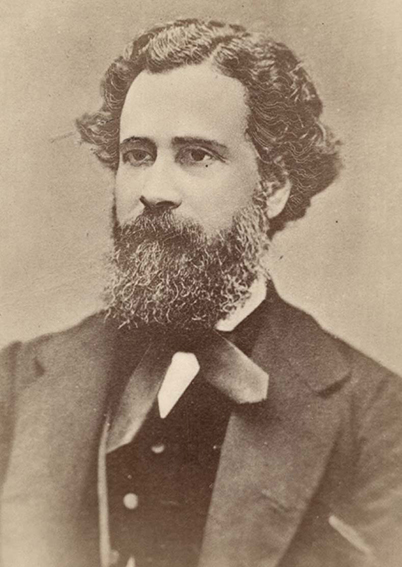
11 years and 177 days: Ion C. Brătianu (1876–1881 and 1881–1888) — Second longest total tenure and longest single term

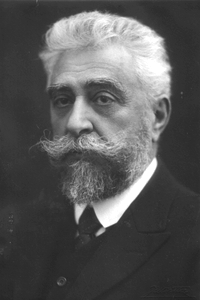
11 years and 170 days: Ion I. C. Brătianu (1908–1910, 1914–1918, 1918–1919, 1922–1926 and 1927) — Third longest total tenure and most terms

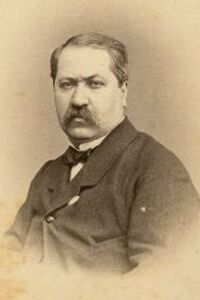
9 years and 247 days: Lascăr Catargiu (1866, 1871–1876, 1889 and 1891–1895) — Fourth longest total tenure and longest period between first and last day as PM

Of the 72 past heads of government, only three served more than 10 years, while thirty served less than a year.

Communist politician and lawyer Ion Gheorghe Maurer is the longest-serving head of government, with a record tenure of 13 years and 7 days. He oversaw a period of further distancing from the USSR and the consolidation of a more nationalistic approach to Romanian communism.

Second and third are liberal icons Ion C. Brătianu and his son, Ion I.C. (Ionel) Brătianu, each serving for more than eleven years. They championed the achievement of two of modern Romania’s most significant national objectives: the securing of independence in 1877 and the fulfillment of national unification through the creation of Greater Romania in 1918, respectively.

Fourth is Lascăr Catargiu, the anchor of early Romanian conservatism, who spearheaded efforts to stabilize the young monarchy amidst the turbulent factionalism of its formative years and build its foundational infrastructure.

At the opposite end of the spectrum, General Gheorghe Argeșanu is the shortest-serving prime minister. His brief tenure was primarily devoted to organizing the crackdown on the Iron Guard following the assassination of his predecessor Armand Călinescu on the fascist organization's orders.

== List of office holders ==
The list is based on the difference between dates; if counted by number of calendar days, all the figures would be one greater.

# in office	Prime minister	Party	Terms	Time in office	Rank
49	Ion Gheorghe Maurer	Romanian Communist Party	5	13 years, 7 days	1
14	Ion C. Brătianu	National Liberal Party	4	11 years, 177 days	2
22	Ion I. C. Brătianu	National Liberal Party	7	11 years, 170 days	3
6	Lascăr Catargiu	Conservatives → Conservative Party	4	9 years, 247 days	4
18	Dimitrie Sturdza	National Liberal Party	4	8 years, 282 days	5
52	Constantin Dăscălescu	Romanian Communist Party	2	7 years, 215 days	6
46	Petru Groza	Ploughmen's Front	4	7 years, 88 days	7
48	Chivu Stoica	Romanian Communist Party	2	5 years, 167 days	8
50	Manea Mănescu	Romanian Communist Party	2	5 years, 2 days	9
36	Gheorghe Tătărescu	National Liberal Party → National Renaissance Front	6	4 years, 215 days	10
55	Nicolae Văcăroiu	Social Democratic Party	1	4 years, 22 days	11
59	Adrian Năstase	Social Democratic Party	1	3 years, 359 days	12
60	Călin Popescu-Tăriceanu	National Liberal Party	2	3 years, 359 days	12
43	Ion Antonescu	Military	3	3 years, 354 days	13
20	Gheorghe Grigore Cantacuzino	Conservative Party	2	3 years, 167 days	14
63	Victor Ponta	Social Democratic Party	4	3 years, 153 days	15
47	Gheorghe Gheorghiu-Dej	Romanian Communist Party	2	3 years, 124 days	16
51	Ilie Verdeț	Romanian Communist Party	2	3 years, 51 days	17
61	Emil Boc	Democratic Liberal Party	2	3 years, 46 days	18
24	Alexandru Averescu	Military → People's Party	3	3 years, 13 days	19
32	Iuliu Maniu	National Peasants' Party	3	2 years, 46 days	20
2	Nicolae Kretzulescu	Moderate Liberals	2	1 year, 351 days	21
71	Marcel Ciolacu	Social Democratic Party	2	1 year, 325 days	22
21	Petre P. Carp	Conservative Party	2	1 year, 310 days	23
53	Petre Roman	National Salvation Front	3	1 year, 294 days	24
67	Viorica Dăncilă	Social Democratic Party	1	1 year, 279 days	25
23	Titu Maiorescu	Conservative Party	2	1 year, 278 days	26
57	Radu Vasile	Christian Democratic National Peasants' Party	1	1 year, 240 days	27
70	Nicolae Ciucă	National Liberal Party	1	1 year, 199 days	28
28	Alexandru Vaida-Voevod	Romanian National Party → National Peasants' Party	4	1 year, 174 days	29
72	Ilie Bolojan	National Liberal Party	1	1 year, 119 days	30
56	Victor Ciorbea	Christian Democratic National Peasants' Party	1	1 year, 108 days	31
3	Mihail Kogălniceanu	Moderate Liberals	1	1 year, 107 days	32
17	Gheorghe Manu	Conservative Party	1	1 year, 102 days	33
10	Dimitrie Ghica	Moderate Conservatives	1	1 year, 72 days	34
34	Nicolae Iorga	Democratic Nationalist Party	1	1 year, 48 days	35
64	Dacian Cioloș	Independent	1	1 year, 48 days	35
54	Theodor Stolojan	National Salvation Front	1	1 year, 34 days	36
68	Ludovic Orban	National Liberal Party	2	1 year, 33 days	37
5	Ion Ghica	Moderate Liberals	3	1 year, 27 days	38
38	Miron Cristea	National Renaissance Front	3	1 year, 23 days	39
58	Mugur Isărescu	Independent	1	1 year, 6 days	40
16	Theodor Rosetti	Conservative Party	2	364 days	41
31	Vintilă Brătianu	National Liberal Party	1	351 days	42
69	Florin Cîțu	National Liberal Party	1	337 days	43
12	Manolache Costache Epureanu	Conservatives → National Liberal Party	2	325 days	44
13	Ioan Emanoil Florescu	Conservatives → Conservative Party	2	300 days	45
8	Ștefan Golescu	Radical Liberals	1	256 days	46
25	Alexandru Marghiloman	Conservative Party	1	232 days	47
66	Mihai Tudose	Social Democratic Party	1	201 days	48
9	Nicolae Golescu	Radical Liberals	1	198 days	49
39	Armand Călinescu	National Renaissance Front	1	198 days	49
33	Gheorghe Mironescu	National Peasants' Party	2	194 days	50
65	Sorin Grindeanu	Social Democratic Party	1	176 days	51
7	Constantin A. Kretzulescu	Radical Liberals	1	157 days	52
4	Constantin Bosianu	Moderate Liberals	1	139 days	53
1	Barbu Catargiu	Conservatives	1	137 days	54
19	Petre S. Aurelian	National Liberal Party	1	125 days	55
44	Constantin Sănătescu	Military	2	104 days	56
62	Mihai Răzvan Ungureanu	Independent	1	88 days	57
45	Nicolae Rădescu	Military	1	84 days	58
11	Alexandru G. Golescu	Moderate Liberals	1	75 days	59
27	Artur Văitoianu	Military	1	64 days	60
42	Ion Gigurtu	National Renaissance Front	1	62 days	61
15	Dumitru Brătianu	National Liberal Party	1	59 days	62
41	Constantin Argetoianu	National Renaissance Front	1	56 days	63
35	Ion G. Duca	National Liberal Party	1	45 days	64
37	Octavian Goga	National Christian Party	1	44 days	65
26	Constantin Coandă	Military	1	36 days	66
29	Take Ionescu	Conservative-Democratic Party	1	31 days	67
30	Barbu Știrbey	Independent	1	16 days	68
40	Gheorghe Argeșanu	Military	1	7 days	69
73	Luca Niculescu	Independent	1	1 day	70

== See also ==
- Prime Minister of Romania
- List of heads of government of Romania
- King of Romania
- President of Romania
- List of presidents of Romania
