= First Carp cabinet =

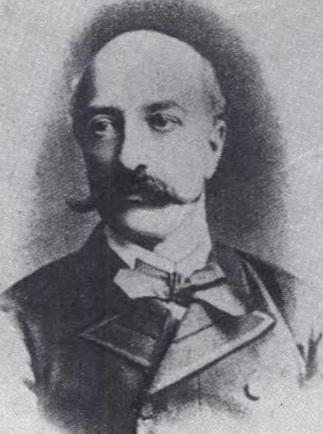
Petre P. Carp

The first cabinet of Petre P. Carp was the government of Romania from 7 July 1900 to 13 February 1901.

== Composition ==
The ministers of the cabinet were as follows:

- President of the Council of Ministers:

- Petre P. Carp (7 July 1900 - 13 February 1901)

- Minister of the Interior:

- Constantin Olănescu (7 July 1900 - 13 February 1901)

- Minister of Foreign Affairs:

- Alexandru Marghiloman (7 July 1900 - 13 February 1901)

- Minister of Finance:

- Petre P. Carp (7 July 1900 - 13 February 1901)

- Minister of Justice:

- Titu Maiorescu (7 July 1900 - 13 February 1901)

- Minister of War:

- Gen. Iacob Lahovary (7 July 1900 - 13 February 1901)

- Minister of Religious Affairs and Public Instruction:

- Constantin C. Arion (7 July 1900 - 13 February 1901)

- Minister of Public Works:

- Ion C. Grădișteanu (7 July 1900 - 13 February 1901)

- Minister of Agriculture, Industry, Commerce, and Property:

- Nicolae Filipescu (7 July 1900 - 13 February 1901)

| Preceded by First Cantacuzino cabinet | Cabinet of Romania; 7 July 1900 - 13 February 1901 | Succeeded by Third Sturdza cabinet |
