= Third Sturdza cabinet =

Government of Romania from 1901 to 1904

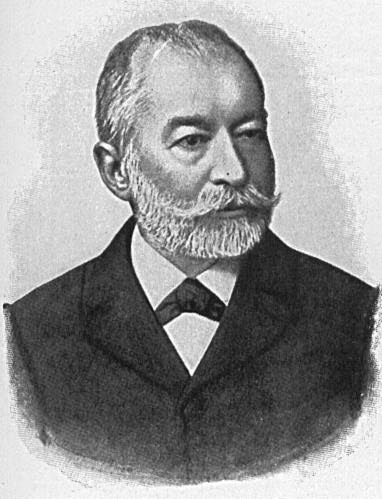
Dimitrie A. Sturdza

The third cabinet of Dimitrie Sturdza was the government of Romania from 14 February 1901 to 20 December 1904.

== Composition ==
The ministers of the cabinet were as follows:

- President of the Council of Ministers:

- Dimitrie Sturdza (14 February 1901 - 20 December 1904)

- Minister of the Interior:

- Petre S. Aurelian (14 February 1901 - 18 July 1902)
- Gheorghe Pallade (18 July 1902 - 22 November 1903)
- Vasile Lascăr (22 November 1903 - 13 December 1904)
- (interim) Spiru Haret (13 - 20 December 1904)

- Minister of Foreign Affairs:

- Dimitrie Sturdza (14 February 1901 - 9 January 1902)
- (interim) Ion I. C. Brătianu (9 January - 18 July 1902)
- Ion I. C. Brătianu (18 July 1902 - 12 December 1904)
- (interim) Dimitrie Sturdza (12 - 20 December 1904)

- Minister of Finance:

- Gheorghe Pallade (14 February 1901 - 9 January 1902)
- Dimitrie Sturdza (9 January - 18 July 1902)
- Emil Costinescu (18 July 1902 - 20 December 1904)

- Minister of Justice:

- Constantin Stoicescu (14 February 1901 - 18 July 1902)
- Eugeniu Stătescu (18 July 1902 - 19 October 1903)
- Alexandru Gianni (19 October 1903 - 20 December 1904)

- Minister of War:

- (interim) Dimitrie Sturdza (14 February 1901 - 18 July 1902)
- Dimitrie Sturdza (18 July 1902 - 20 December 1904)

- Minister of Religious Affairs and Public Instruction:

- Spiru Haret (14 February 1901 - 20 December 1904)

- Minister of Agriculture, Industry, Commerce, and Property:

- Basile M. Missir (14 February 1901 - 18 July 1902)
- Petre S. Aurelian (18 July - 14 November 1902)
- (interim) Dimitrie Sturdza (14 - 22 November 1902)
- Constantin Stoicescu (22 November 1902 - 20 December 1904)

- Minister of Public Works:

- Ion I. C. Brătianu (14 February 1901 - 18 July 1902)
- Constantin Stoicescu (18 July - 22 November 1902)
- (interim) Dimitrie Sturdza (22 November 1902 - 14 November 1903)
- Emanoil Porumbaru (14 November 1903 - 20 December 1904)

Preceded by First Carp cabinet	Cabinet of Romania; 14 February 1901 - 20 December 1904	Succeeded by Second Cantacuzino cabinet
