= Sarmiza Bilcescu =

Romania's first female lawyer (1867–1935)

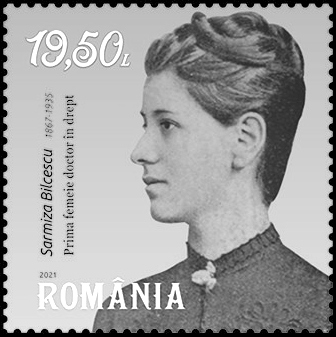
Bilcescu on a 2021 stamp of Romania

Sarmiza or Sarmisegetuza or Sarmisa Bilcescu (later Bilcescu-Alimănișteanu; 27 April 1867 – 26 August 1935) was a Romanian lawyer, the first woman ever to study law and obtain a PhD in law from the Faculty of Law of Paris (University of Paris), and the first female lawyer in her country.

== Biography ==
Coming from a family closely associated with that of Ion Brătianu, Sarmiza was accompanied to France by her mother, a self-avowed feminist.

Having applied for University in 1884, Bilcescu was given a poor reception at the faculty; in the words of Edmond Louis Armand Colmet De Santerre, the Professor of Civil law, "We hesitated to award Miss Bilcescu the authorization she demanded, fearing that we would have to police the amphitheaters". She even complained that, after being ultimately accepted, the doorman had not being allowed to enter the university hall (feeling insulted, she pointed out that such behavior contradicted the Liberté, égalité, fraternité motto present above the gate). Nevertheless, after completing her first year of studies, Colmet De Santerre addressed the student body, mentioning Bilcescu's "relentlessness beyond all praise and exemplary conduct", thanking male students for having "welcomed her as a sister" (the speech was received with applause by the audience).

She obtained an undergraduate degree in law in 1887. In 1890, when 71% of female students in France were of foreign origin, Bilcescu was also one of the European women to obtain a PhD in law, after Marie Popelin in 1888. Her thesis was titled De la condition légale de la mère ("On the Legal Condition of the Mother"). During the 1880s, a Romanian woman, Christina Cutzarida, had been the first in her country to obtain a doctorate in Medicine.

In 1891, following Constantin Dissescu's campaign in her favor, she was admitted with full honors to the bar association in Ilfov County (which, at that time, also included Bucharest), which was presided over by the notorious lawyer and politician Take Ionescu. Aside from being a first in her country (in which women had traditionally been rejected on the basis of Roman law), this event was unprecedented in comparison to most European countries. The measure was notably welcomed by the Belgian lawyer and liberal politician Louis Franck, who deemed it "a major innovation".

Nevertheless, Bilcescu never practiced. Elena Popovici, the next woman to apply for a Romanian bar association, and, incidentally, for the same one in Ilfov, was not accepted (1901). Sarmiza Bilcescu married Constantin Alimănişteanu six years after being admitted to the bar, and subsequently retired from her profession, while remaining active in feminist circles, and being among the founding members of Societatea Domnişoarelor Române (the Society of Romanian Young Ladies"). Together with Ana Haret, Sabina Cantacuzino and Maria N. Filipescu, she created a committee presided over by Queen Marie, which, for a while in 1915, unsuccessfully campaigned in favor of offering supplementary education to women who were denied access to higher learning.

Mihail Fărcășanu published her biography in 1947 under the pseudonym Mihai Villara.

She was married to the engineer Constantin Alimănişteanu.

== See also ==
- First women lawyers around the world
