= Constantin Iancovescu =

Romanian politician and general

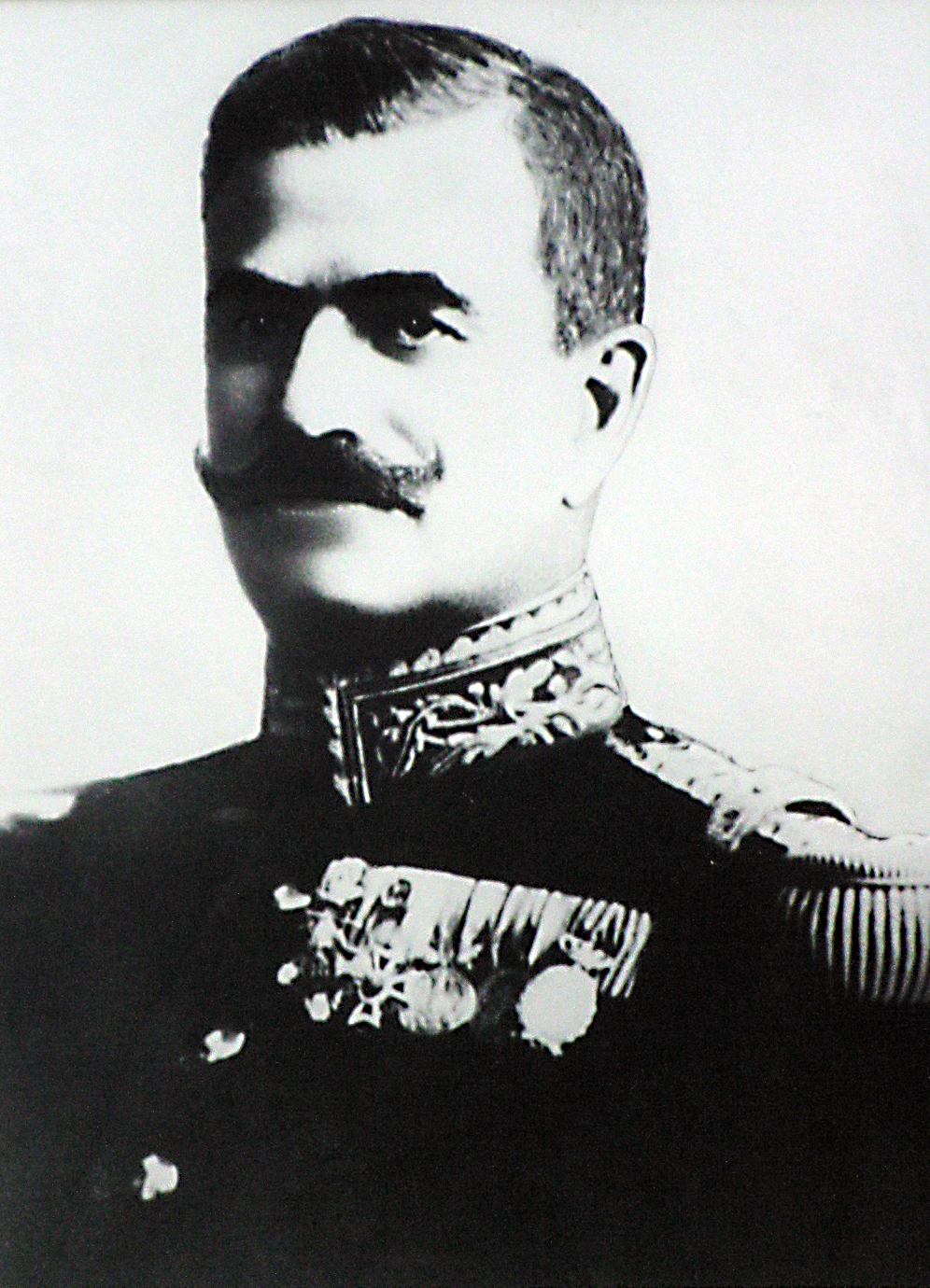

Minister of War of Kingdom of Romania
- In office July 20, 1917 – March 5, 1918
- Monarch: Ferdinand I of Romania
- Preceded by: Vintilă Brătianu
- Succeeded by: Constantin Hârjeu

Personal details
- Born: 1862
- Died: 1945 (aged 82–83)

Military service
- Rank: Lieutenant General
- Battles/wars: World War I

Constantin Iancovescu (1862–1945) was a Romanian politician and general.

Prior to World War I, Iancovescu achieved the rank of brigadier general in 1915. At the onset of World War I, he served as Secretary General of the Ministry of War from August to September 1916. In November of 1916, he became Chief of General Staff and Commander of the Danube Defense Group, and later, Commander of the Third Army (Armata a 3-a Română) from December 1916 to July 24, 1917.

On December 1, 1917, Iancovescu was awarded the Order of Michael the Brave, III Class, for the way he led his troops at the Battle of the Argeș, which occurred one year earlier, from 1 to 3 December 1916.

"For the way he led the troops of the Danube Defense Group during the fierce battles at Călugăreni in November 1916 and the skill with which he facilitated the operations of the Argeș Army." High Decree no. 1403, "Mihai Viteazul" Order, class III, December 1, 1917

He served as Minister of War between July 20, 1917 and March 5, 1918, achieving the rank of lieutenant general and replacing Vintilă Brătianu, who assumed command of the newly created Ministry of Munitions and War Materials.

From 1916 to 1919, Iancovescu served as director of the National Military Circle.

Military offices
Preceded by Vintilă Brătianu	Minister of National Defence; July 20, 1917 – March 5, 1918	Succeeded by Constantin Hârjeu
