= Gheorghe Derussi =

Romanian politician

Minister of Foreign Affairs of Romania
- In office December 17, 1921 – January 19, 1922
- Monarch: Ferdinand of Romania
- Preceded by: Take Ionescu
- Succeeded by: Ion G. Duca

Personal details
- Born: January 3, 1870 Pitești, Kingdom of Romania
- Died: December 10, 1931 (aged 61) Sibiu, Romania

Gheorghe Derussi (January 3, 1870 – December 10, 1931) was a Romanian politician who served as the Minister of Foreign Affairs of Romania from December 17, 1921, until January 19, 1922, under the reign of Romanian King Ferdinand of Romania.

Prior to becoming the minister, Derussi was the first Romanian envoy plenipotentiary to Stockholm appointed on April 1, 1917. On May 1, 1917, Derussi was also accredited to Oslo and Copenhagen, where Romanian diplomatic missions opened simultaneously.

== See also ==
- Foreign relations of Romania
