= Constantin Hârjeu =

Romanian general and engineer

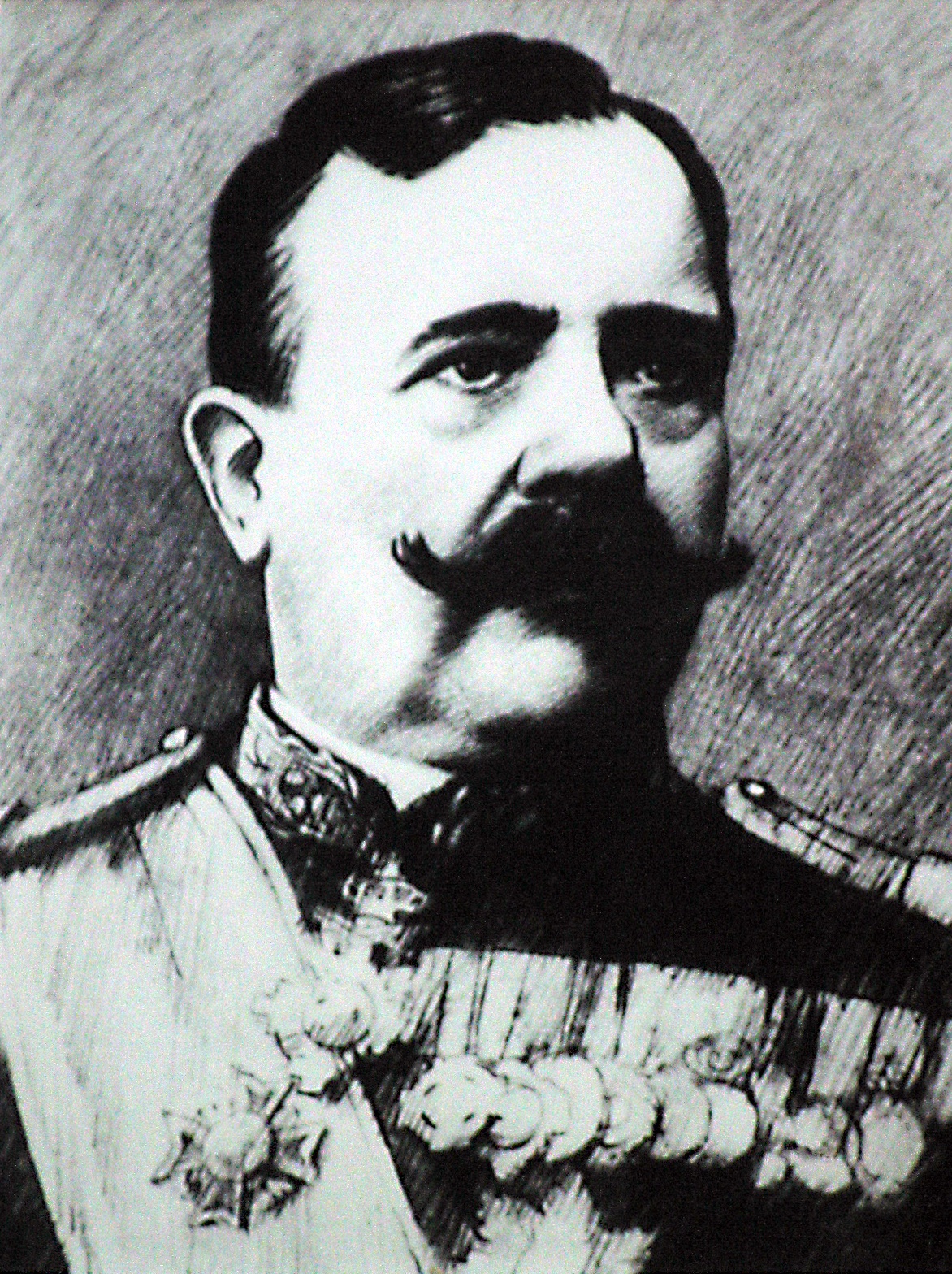
Constantin Hârjeu

Constantin Hârjeu (December 10, 1856 – May 24, 1928) was a Romanian general and engineer.

Born into a poor family in Bucharest, he attended the officers’ school there from 1874 to 1876. Hârjeu then went to the École Polytechnique in Paris and to the School of Applied Artillery at Fontainebleau, becoming among the first Romanian military engineers educated abroad. Returning home, he steadily advanced through the ranks of the Romanian Land Forces, becoming a brigadier general in 1904.

Meanwhile, Hârjeu taught at the Higher War School and at the artillery and military engineering school. His textbooks on topography (1886) and military telegraphy (1890) were widely used. He contributed to military magazines, and in 1900 wrote a French-language study of the Romanian Army. His interest in fortifications led him to author a book on the history of military engineering, awarded a prize by the Romanian Academy in 1902.

Hârjeu was himself elected a corresponding member of the Academy in 1909. He served twice as War Minister: October 1912–January 1914, and March–October 1918. He was also interim Public Works Minister in 1918. He died in Bucharest in 1928.
