= Constantin C. Arion =

Romanian politician (1855–1923)

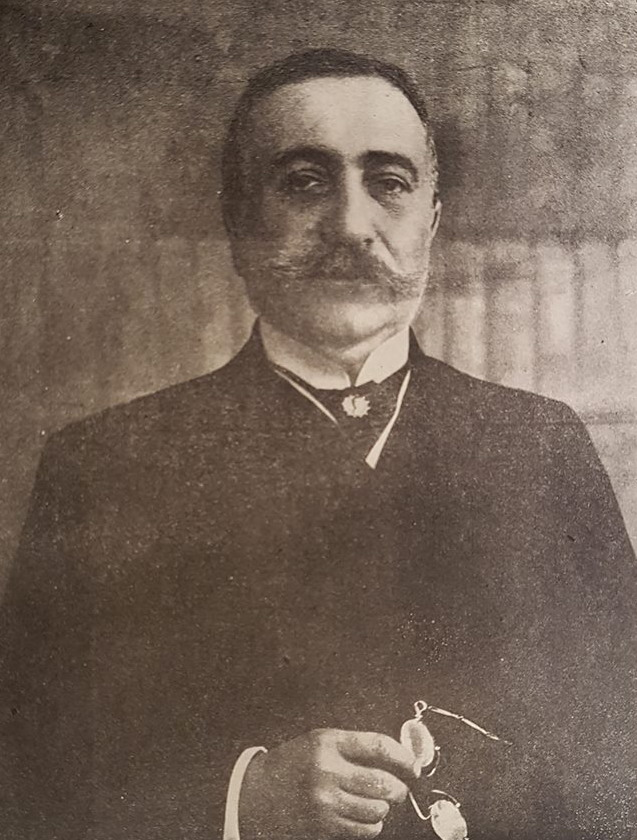
- Arion in 1918

Minister of Foreign Affairs of Romania
- In office March 5, 1918 – October 23, 1918
- Monarch: Ferdinand I
- Preceded by: Alexandru Averescu
- Succeeded by: Constantin Coandă

Minister of Administration and Interior of Romania
- In office March 28, 1912 – October 14, 1912
- Monarch: Carol I of Romania
- Preceded by: Alexandru Marghiloman
- Succeeded by: Take Ionescu

Minister of Religion and Public Instruction
- In office July 7, 1900 – February 13, 1901
- Preceded by: Constantin Istrati
- Succeeded by: Spiru Haret
- In office December 29, 1910 – October 14, 1912
- Preceded by: Spiru Haret
- Succeeded by: Constantin G. Dissescu

Minister of Agriculture and Royal Domains
- In office April 5, 1913 – December 31, 1913
- Preceded by: Ioan Lahovary
- Succeeded by: Alexandru Constantinescu-Porcu

Personal details
- Born: June 18, 1855 Bucharest, Principality of Wallachia
- Died: June 27, 1923 (aged 68) Bucharest, Kingdom of Romania

Constantin C. Arion (also known as Costică Arion; June 18, 1855 – June 27, 1923) was a Romanian politician, affiliated with the National Liberal Party, the Conservative Party and, after 1918, the People's Party. He served two terms as Minister of Religion and Public Instruction, one term as Minister of Agriculture, and another one as Interior Minister before World War I. His career peaked in 1918, when he was Minister of Foreign Affairs.

A young lawyer who supported political reform, Arion moved progressively to the right, and, ca. 1885, became involved with the political club Junimea. As a Conservative policymaker and disciple of Alexandru Marghiloman, he rewrote legislation on education reform and brought the Romanian Orthodox Church under the control of its high clergy. Like Marghiloman, Arion supported the Central Powers during most of World War I, a position which seemed to carry most weight during the 1918 armistice. His participation in the Marghiloman government recovered for Romania the region of Bessarabia, but the subsequent return of Ententist forces made him a political suspect. He spent the remainder of his life as a marginal.

In addition to his presence in political life, Arion was an art patron, university professor, and philanthropist. He was the brother of Virgil Arion, and the father of Dinu C. Arion.

== Biography ==
=== Early life and career ===
The Arions were an old Wallachian family, first attested in Brăila ca. 1696, and integrated into the boyar aristocracy in the mid-18th century. Its reputation was stained by two members: Constantin Eracle Arion and Anton I. Arion, who had committed massive bank fraud throughout the early 1870s.

Constantin (born in Bucharest on June 18, 1855) and Virgil C. Arion were the sons of Appellate Judge Constantin Arion and Sevastița, née Urlățeanu. Constantin C. followed in his father's footsteps, graduating in Law from the University of Paris (Doctorate in 1876) and in Political Science from Sciences Po. Upon his return to Romania, he was made Cabinet Secretary of Foreign Minister Vasile Boerescu, then head of Political Affairs, but left in 1881 to set up legal practice.

Two years later, he was also employed by the University of Bucharest Faculty of Law, where he lectured in business and admiralty law. He received tenure in 1913, and became editor of the academic journal, Revista Critică de Drept, Legislație și Jurisprudență ("Critical Review of Law, Legislation and Jurisprudence"). Virgil had a similar career in law and academia, while a third brother, Scarlat Arion, was a landowner and a Romanian consul in Bitola.

C. C. Arion made his debut in politics as a National Liberal, ran in the elections of 1884, and was elected to the Assembly of Deputies in Ilfov County. At the time, he was dedicated to the cause of representative democracy, and paid homage to the leadership of Romanian radicalism.

By the mid-1880s, C. C. Arion had become jaded with the ideals of liberalism, and was hostile toward National Liberal Premier, Ion Brătianu. During 1886, Arion, Take Ionescu and Nicolae Fleva were the main "United Opposition" agitators who tried to seal a pact with the Junimea conservatives, in an effort to topple the National Liberals. He first attended Junimea club meetings around 1885, when he met and befriended the Junimist leader, Titu Maiorescu. The group had past its prime, and, as Maiorescu recorded in his private notes, the sessions attended by Arion were "rather dull". The conservative association had been traditionally hostile toward Arion's "unproductive" and "lawyerly" liberalism. As Junimist poet-critic Mihai Eminescu once wrote, the Arion brothers were "the runts, the intellectual and moral plebs, ... everything basest and most degraded that one can expect to find in the cities of the Romanian nation".

In later years, Arion focused on his cultural projects. From 1896, he was president of the national school and public libraries board (Casa Şcoalelor), where he employed the services of poet George Coșbuc. His legal expertise was demanded in Romania v. Nicolae Georgescu, a cause célèbre for honor crime in Romania. Arion represented the civil party, Aurelia Stelorian, whom Georgescu had assaulted with acid; his adversary in court was another famous lawyer, Barbu Ștefănescu Delavrancea. Arion and Delavrancea both were celebrity guests at the Bucharest lecture tour of Joséphin Péladan, the French mystic and novelist (1898).

=== Conservative politico ===
Returning to public life as a "constitutionalist" conservative, Arion joined Junimea and served as Minister of Religion and Public Instruction under Premier Petre P. Carp. His efforts centered on bringing the Romanian Orthodox Church under government control, with the purpose of regulating religious education. He oversaw the collecting and publishing historical documents, edited by Nicolae Iorga.

Arion made significant efforts to reverse the policies adopted by Spiru Haret, his National Liberal predecessor. He sacked Haret's favorites and replaced them with Junimea men, but also introduced legislation which made bureaucratic office incompatible with a teaching position. The two politicians also differed in matters of church policies. Haret had favored the married clergy over the elitist Romanian Synod, creating a Consistory to represent both sides. Arion reversed that reform, and unwittingly prolonged the conflict well into the 20th century.

After the Carp government was dissolved in 1901, Arion returned to academic life. He was still active with the constitutionalist Junimists, worked as editorial adviser for their magazine, Convorbiri Literare, and, in 1907, followed them into their merger with the Conservative Party. Answering Maiorescu's call, Arion and Delavrancea became political journalists for the main Conservative-Junimist daily, Epoca. By also appointing Arion at Convorbiri Literare, Maiorescu was reaffirming his directorial role. Arion and other new staff members were supposed to undermine the editorial policies of Ioan Bogdan and Mihail Dragomirescu. Maiorescu dismissed Bogdan's previous management as a triumph of mârlănie ("churliness"), and hoped to reverse the trend.

This period saw Arion networking and organizing political cabals. He personally intervened to ensure the full-time employment of aspiring jurists, including Paul Negulescu and his own nephew, Ion Peretz. He met and befriended Ion Luca Caragiale, the Junimist political satirist. Together with Caragiale and Delavrancea, Arion could be seen dining at the Ploiești restaurant owned by Constantin Dobrogeanu-Gherea. From 1909, Arion was also active as a philanthropist, serving on the board of Queen Elisabeth's charitable society, and as honorary president of the Romanian Artists' Society.

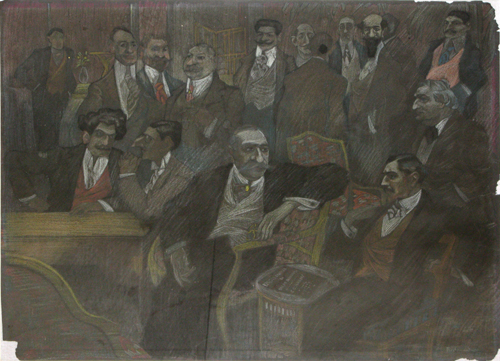
Arion (seated at center) and Romanian journalists. Conté drawing by Ion Theodorescu-Sion, ca. 1910

Arion was again appointed Public Instruction Minister in 1910, when Carp was named Premier of a Conservative cabinet. He preserved this position after Carp was replaced with Maiorescu, while also serving as head of Internal Affairs and Agriculture and Royal Domains. It fell on Arion to adopt the set of agricultural reforms that National Liberal politicians had been postponing ever since the Peasants' Revolt of 1907. At Public Instruction, he also granted religious and educational privileges to the Albanian-Romanian community. During the interval, he was elected honorary member of the Romanian Academy.

Arion's mandate witnessed another outbreak of civic disobedience, this time centered on the public cult of liberal symbols, including images of Domnitor Alexander John Cuza. In order to avoid a showdown between the Conservatives and the National Liberals, Arion agreed to inaugurate the Cuza monument of Iași. At the time, Arion also made public his approval of Romanian irredentism, in respect to Bessarabia region (taken by the Russian Empire in 1812). He gave his approval to commemorative marches, and engaged in a publicized row with anti-irredentist Conservatives, such as Mayor Dimitrie Greceanu.

Arion slowly aligned his educational policies with Haret's principles. The "Arion Law", adopted by Parliament in 1912, established clear criteria for the promotion of teachers and academics, ensuring greater professionalization: teaching positions were granted on the basis of a solid scientific reputation in the respective field of expertise. However, the reform law became especially noted for its loopholes, which allowed senior teachers to reserve academic chairs in advance.

=== World War I and after ===
Arion was close to the Conservative leaders Carp and Alexandru Marghiloman, and detested their competitor, Nicolae Filipescu. He became president of the Bucharest Conservative Club just shortly after the start of World War I. Under a National Liberal government, Romania remained a neutral country, a policy that was welcomed by the senior, "Germanophile", Conservatives: Carp, Maiorescu, Marghiloman. They were hotly opposed by another Conservative faction, under Filipescu and Take Ionescu, who demanded engagement on the Entente side. As noted by his Conservative colleagues, Arion was "an optimist" committed to the Entente, but followed Marghiloman's lead.

Eventually, in June 1916, the government announced that Romania had joined the Entente, and a trans-party war cabinet was suggested. Arion refused to be part of this project, declaring his sympathy for the Central Powers, and the Conservative Party split in half. Constantin's brother Virgil and his son, Dinu (who was secretary of the Conservative Study Circle) shared his ideas on national politics.

Following the German advance into southern Romania, C. C. Arion remained behind enemy lines, in Bucharest; the National Liberal cabinet and its Filipescu Conservative backers had relocated to a temporary home in Iaşi. He still represented Marghiloman's Conservative Club: traveling to Focșani, on the front line, he met representatives of the legitimate government and communicated to them the situation in Bucharest. He frequented the Germanophile circle of Raymund Netzhammer and Marthe Bibesco, with whom he discussed the idea of granting the Romanian throne to a Habsburg-Lorraine prince. Virgil Arion was a more radical Germanophile: he agreed to take over as Minister of Public Instruction in the puppet government of Lupu Kostaki, answering to the occupiers.

After the shock of the October Revolution and the Treaty of Brest-Litovsk, Romania yielded to the Central Powers. Marghiloman was appointed Premier, and agreed to sign Romania's withdrawal from the war (May 1918). Arion, as Marghiloman's "second fiddle" and Foreign Minister up until October 24, was one of the signatories of the Treaty of Bucharest. He was privately enthusiastic about the turn of events, since he believed that Romania would recover at the same time some of its irredenta, claimed from the Russian Republic, and the territories held by the Central Powers. In this capacity, he traveled to the Russian breakaway region of Bessarabia (or Moldavian Democratic Republic). Representing Romania, he witnessed the Bessarabian–Romanian union. He also made significant efforts to postpone the ratification of Marghiloman's surrender, allowing Romania to reenter the war on the Central Powers.

While affiliated with Margiloman's Conservative Party, Arion also joined the eclectic anti-liberal movement, or People's League (the future "People's Party"), whose leader was the war hero Alexandru Averescu. His son followed in his footsteps, running on the Conservative list in the 1918 elections. In early 1919, Virgil Arion was arrested by the Romanian authorities, on charges of collaborationism. He was freed in short while, but virtually disappeared from public life until 1930. Despite his own displays of loyalty, C. C. Arion was also marginalized as a Germanophile by the returning National Liberals.

Arion was asked to explain himself before a university inquiry committee, but he never honored the request. He died in Bucharest on June 27, 1923. He had been the recipient of various orders of merit: a Grand Cross of the Order of the Crown, the Order of the Redeemer, and the Order of St. Sava; a Grand Officer of the Order of Carol I, the Star of Romania, and the Legion of Honor. His son Dinu became a professional historian and lecturer at the Bucharest Academy of Economic Studies.
