= Constantin Dissescu =

Romanian jurist and politician (1854–1932)

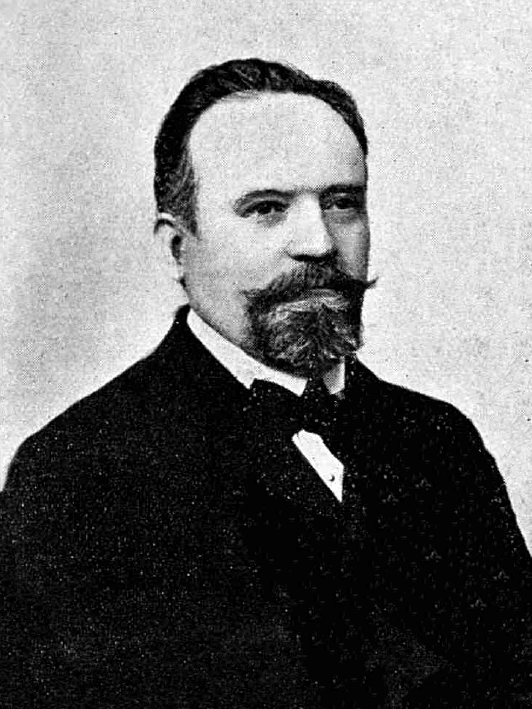
Dissescu in 1910

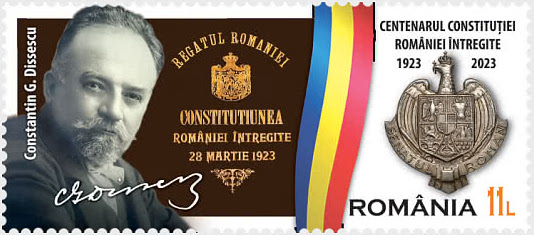
Dissescu on a 2023 stamp of Romania

Constantin G. Dissescu (8 August 1854–10 August 1932) was a Romanian jurist and politician.

Born in Slatina, he was the son of a magistrate. After graduating from Saint Sava National College in Bucharest, Dissescu followed family tradition, studying law and history at the University of Paris. He obtained an undergraduate degree in 1875 and a law doctorate two years later. Returning to Romania, he served as a judge on the Ilfov County tribunal from 1878 to 1880. He then taught law at the Universities of Iași (1883) and Bucharest from 1884. He served as law faculty dean at Bucharest from 1909 to 1913. He was state’s attorney from 1892 to 1893.

Dissescu edited Dreptul newspaper, and in 1907 pleaded on behalf of a law for organizing the legal profession. He belonged to the National Liberal Party (PNL) until 1885, when he joined the Conservative Party. In 1908, he followed Take Ionescu into the Conservative-Democratic Party, rejoining the PNL after World War I. He was Minister of Justice from April 1899 to July 1900, and Minister of Religious Affairs and Public Education twice: from October 1906 to February 1907, and from October 1912 to December 1913. He was a Senator for a number of terms.

In 1891, Dissescu insisted on admitting to the bar Sarmiza Bilcescu, Romania’s first female lawyer. He forcefully advocated for adopting the 1923 Constitution of Romania. He authored studies of law (Chestiunea revizuirii legii electorale, Originea și condițiunea proprietății în România, Legea Minelor) and history (Conferinṭă asupra vieții lui Barbu Știrbeiu, Amintiri și impresii din Cadrilater), as well as literary or social essays (Psihologia călugărului, Despre poezia română, Ovide, Despre imitație, Povețe de viață).

Dissescu was married to Alexandrina Hagi Panteli, who came from a wealthy boyar merchant family. Their daughter married the diplomat Gheorghe Derussi. From 1902, the family lived in Casa Dissescu on Calea Victoriei.
