= Take Ionescu =

Romanian politician, journalist, lawyer and diplomat (1858–1922)

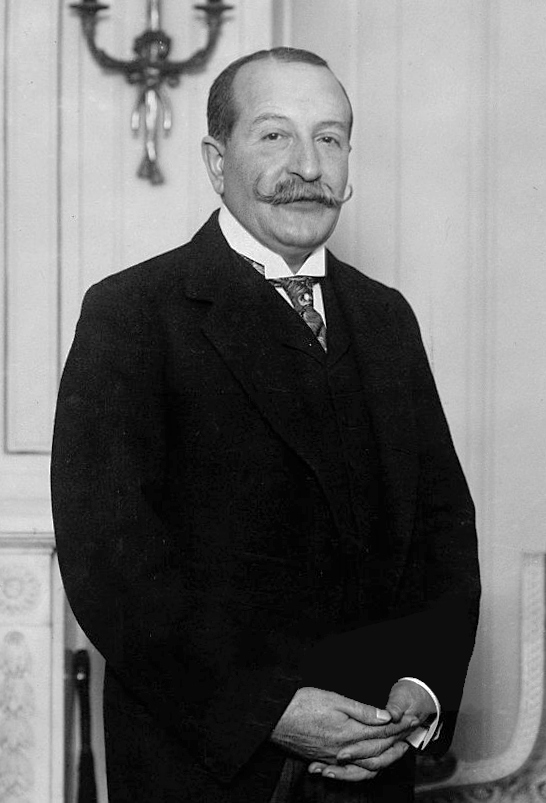
- Take Ionescu in 1913

29th Prime Minister of Romania
- In office 17 December 1921 – 17 January 1922
- Monarch: Ferdinand I
- Preceded by: Alexandru Averescu
- Succeeded by: Ion I. C. Brătianu

Deputy Prime Minister of Romania
- In office 11 December 1916 – 28 January 1918
- Prime Minister: Ion I. C. Brătianu

Foreign Affairs Minister of Romania
- In office 13 June 1920 – 16 December 1921
- Prime Minister: Alexandru Averescu
- Preceded by: Duiliu Zamfirescu
- Succeeded by: Gheorghe Derussi

Internal Affairs Minister of Romania
- In office 14 October 1912 – 31 December 1913
- Prime Minister: Titu Maiorescu
- Preceded by: Constantin C. Arion
- Succeeded by: Vasile Morțun

Finance Minister of Romania
- In office 17 December 1921 – 19 January 1922; 22 December 1904 – 12 March 1907; 9 January – 6 July 1900
- Prime Minister: Himself; Gheorghe Grigore Cantacuzino
- Preceded by: Nicolae Titulescu; Emil Costinescu; Gheorghe Manu
- Succeeded by: Vintilă Brătianu; Emil Costinescu; Petre P. Carp

Education Minister of Romania
- In office 11 April 1899 – 9 January 1900; 27 November 1891 – 3 October 1895
- Prime Minister: Gheorghe Grigore Cantacuzino; Lascăr Catargiu
- Preceded by: Spiru Haret; Petru Poni
- Succeeded by: Constantin Istrati; Petru Poni

Personal details
- Born: 25 October 1858 Ploiești, Wallachia
- Died: 21 June 1922 (aged 63) Rome, Kingdom of Italy
- Resting place: Sinaia Monastery
- Party: National Liberal Party; Conservative Party; Conservative-Democratic Party
- Spouses: Elisabeth (Bessie) Richards (m. 1881–1918) Alexandrina Ecaterina Woroniecki (Adina Olmazu) (m. 1919)
- Education: University of Paris
- Occupation: Politician; lawyer; journalist

Take or Tache Ionescu (Romanian pronunciation: [ˈtake joˈnesku]; born Dumitru Ghiță Ioan and also known as Demetriu G. Ionnescu; 25 October [O.S. 13 October] 1858 – 21 June 1922) was a Romanian centrist politician, journalist, lawyer and diplomat, who also enjoyed reputation as a short story author. Starting his political career as a radical member of the National Liberal Party (PNL), he joined the Conservative Party in 1891, and became noted as a social conservative expressing support for several progressive and nationalist tenets. Ionescu is generally viewed as embodying the rise of middle-class politics inside the early 20th century Kingdom of Romania (occasionally described as Takism), and, throughout the period, promoted a project of Balkan alliances while calling for measures to incorporate the Romanian-inhabited Austro-Hungarian regions of Transylvania, Banat and Bukovina. Representing his own faction inside the Conservative Party, he clashed with the group's leadership in 1907–1908, and consequently created and led his own Conservative-Democratic Party.

An Anglophile promoting an alliance with the Triple Entente, he rallied politicians and intellectuals in support for the idea of Romania entering World War I. When this was accomplished through the 1916–1918 campaign, Ionescu joined the Ion I. C. Brătianu government in Iași as Minister without portfolio. After his country was defeated by the Central Powers and signed the Treaty of Bucharest, he left for Paris and London, organizing a Romanian National Committee to campaign for Greater Romania during the Peace Conference. In 1919, his Conservative-Democrats formed an alliance with the People's League, and Ionescu became Foreign Affairs Minister in the second Alexandru Averescu executive, before briefly holding the office of Premier in 1921–1922. During the period, he successfully campaigned in favor of the Little Entente.

He was the brother of renowned surgeon and political activist Thoma Ionescu, who was his collaborator on several political projects. Take Ionescu is also remembered for promoting Nicolae Titulescu, who went on to have a successful career as a diplomat and politician, and for his friendships with the dramatist Ion Luca Caragiale and the Greek politician Eleftherios Venizelos.

== Biography ==
=== Early life and politics ===
Born in Ploiești into a family of lower middle class origins, the eldest of four male children, he was the son of Ghiță Ioan, an entrepreneur who was facing insolvency, and his wife Eufrosina (or Frosa). Eufrosina was the descendant of Aromanian immigrants, and related to the Wallachian writer Ion Heliade Rădulescu.

During Take's childhood, the family moved to Bucharest and later to Giurgiu, where Ghiță Ioan began to accumulate a fortune after leasing a segment of the customs in the city. This allowed him to send his sons to study abroad; after entering the Saint Sava High School with a scholarship and graduating with honors, Take Ionescu (as he became known in his student days) entered the University of Paris and took a PhD in Law, attending courses together with, among others, the future politicians Raymond Poincaré, Constantin Dissescu, Constantin Arion, Grigore Andronescu, Alexandru Djuvara, and Alexandru Marghiloman. During his high school years, he began contributing to literary magazines and authoring works of verse and especially short stories influenced by the style of Gérard de Nerval and including the time travel story Spiritele anului 3000 ("The Spirits of the Year 3000").

While in Paris, Ionescu fell in love with an Englishwoman named Bessie Richards, whom he met a charity event, and to whom he dedicated his PhD thesis (La recherche de la paternité naturelle, "Research into Natural Parenthood"). After consulting international law on the matter of marriage, he decided it was best if he were to marry her in Britain. They sealed their union in a common law marriage in Brighton, and later through an Eastern Orthodox religious ceremony in London (November 1881). The couple were to settle in Bucharest, but made frequent visits to Bessie's native country for the rest of her life.

Upon his return, he opened a highly successful law practice on Bucharest's Costa-Foru Street (later known as Atena Street), and frequently traveled to various areas of the country in order to plead in various cases. His oratorical talent won him the moniker Tăkiţă gură de aur, "Tăkiţă the golden mouthed", based on a pet form of his colloquial name and the title commonly associated with eloquence (see John Chrysostom). He became President of the Bar association in Ilfov County (at a time when it included Bucharest), in which capacity he welcomed the first-ever Romanian woman lawyer, Sarmiza Bilcescu (1891).

Originally a member of the National Liberal Party (PNL), he was attracted to its Radical wing (led by C. A. Rosetti), wrote extensively for the Liberal newspaper Românul, and became a PNL representative in the Chamber of Deputies following the 1884 election. One year later, while still in office, he left the PNL — this came at a time when opposition forces rallied against the policies of Premier Ion Brătianu, whom Ionescu had originally supported. Initially running as an independent in the election of 1888, being elected in Craiova, he switched to conservative politics (generally associated with the landowner circles), and joined the Conservative Party in 1891.

=== First ministerial positions and birth of Takism ===
A leading figure of the Conservatives for the following years, he held several ministerial positions after 1891: he was Minister of Religious Affairs and Education in the Lascăr Catargiu cabinet (1891–1895) and again under Gheorghe Grigore Cantacuzino (April 1899 – January 1900), as well as Minister of Finance (January–July 1900; 1904–1907) in both Cantacuzino cabinets. In 1899, Ionescu took the side of Jewish scientist Lazăr Şăineanu, endorsing his naturalization in front of opposition from the antisemitic faction among the National Liberals, and helped bring the matter for renewed discussion in the Senate. He also helped the scholar earn credentials by overseeing his conversion from Judaism to the Romanian Orthodox Church, and serving as his godfather. However, by the end of the same year, Ionescu had mysteriously changed in mind: he voted in favor of complicating naturalization procedures for Jews and, as Education Minister, stripped Şăineanu of his honorary teaching position within the University of Bucharest. A supposed atheist, he was criticized by the opposition for favoring an increased role for the Romanian Orthodox Church, and replied that it was a matter for his own conscience. During the period, he befriended the notorious and independent-minded dramatist Ion Luca Caragiale, who later supported his dissident politics.

From 1898, he began issuing the French-language newspaper La Roumanie, through which he publicized his own program, commonly referred to as Takism. At the time, contrary to the more cautious policies of his party, he began voicing full support for incorporating Transylvania, a region largely inhabited by Romanians and ruled by Austria-Hungary, into the Kingdom of Romania; he even made a symbolic conquest by financing the building of a road in the vicinity of Buşteni, on the Transleithanian side of the border. Initially, he welcomed the idea of Romania itself entering the Habsburg monarchy in a federalist project (see United States of Greater Austria), as a means to solve the nationality issue, but eventually came to oppose it; in a conversation with the PNL's Constantin Stere, who continued to support the idea, Ionescu declared: "instead of a foreign minister in Vienna, if Romania should join the Habsburgs, I would rather become a waiter in Chicago!".

He contemplated a future Balkan federation, and in a 1903 interview, argued that, although such a solution was "impossible for the moment", it "could perhaps be accomplished some day". Additionally, Ionescu supported the Vlach cause in the Ottoman-ruled regions of the Balkans, and supported the recognition of a "Kutzovlach ethnicity". In this last instance, he caused a diplomatic incident when, during a 1905 official trip to Istanbul, he attempted to present Sultan Abdul Hamid II with such a project and was denied an audience — consequently refusing to be presented with an Ottoman decoration, he was ultimately received and his report was reviewed by the Porte.

=== 1907 Peasants' Revolt ===
He sided with the Conservative Nicolae Filipescu, who shared his views on the issue of Transylvania, and provoked a conflict within his grouping at a time when the PNL was strengthening itself by incorporating a large part of the Romanian Social Democratic Workers' Party. Around 1907, seeking party leadership, he came to oppose the other main Conservative leaders Cantacuzino and Petre P. Carp — the latter represented the party's Junimea faction, which had just re-entered the main Conservative Party after an independent existence under the name of Constitutional Party; Ionescu also repeatedly clashed with the other Constitutional leader, the influential literary critic Titu Maiorescu. Constantin Xeni, his future collaborator, argued that "the boyar wing of [the Conservative Party] had made life impossible for this son of an obscure bourgeois from Ploieşti".

Despite such differences in opinion, Ionescu initially stood by the Conservative establishment during the Peasants' Revolt of 1907. He held up estate leaseholders as a productive social class (arguing that, unlike peasants, "[they] do not consume their own income"), and approved of repressive measures to the point where he initiated the decision taken by his cabinet to resign, to be replaced by that of the PNL's Dimitrie Sturdza. This was also prompted by his fears that Carp and Cantacuzino were going to use his ministry's problems as a means to undermine his political support. During the events, he questioned traditional Conservative stances, stressing that there existed a large gap between the ruling class and the mass of the people.

Identifying him as the person behind his return to power, Sturdza publicly thanked Ionescu during his investiture ceremony, to the enthusiasm of the Chamber. With 33 other politicians from both political camps (among them Carp, Constantin Stere, Gheorghe Gh. Mârzescu, Ion G. Duca, Alexandru Djuvara, Constantin Alimănişteanu, Ion and Alexandru G. Radovici, Dinu and Vintilă Brătianu), he was a member of a short-lived Parliamentary Committee charged with finding a solution to the agrarian issue; created in June, it was dissolved by the cabinet later in the same month. Soon after this, Sturdza and Ionescu engaged in a publicized argument, with Sturdza accusing him of having provoked the revolt through excessive taxation; reacting to this allegation, Ionescu rested the blame with antisemites inciting public sentiment against Jewish leaseholders, and with a wider network of agitators. In addition, he virulently opposed PNL legislation that imposed a minimum wage for work on estates, a maximum income for leaseholders, and set aside grazing land for communal ownership. He argued that such demands went against regulations on the free market and property. When a compromise was eventually reached regarding land prices and the land which was available for leasing to anyone other than communes, he defended it in front of opposition from within his own party, while pointing out ways in which professional leaseholders could avoid the letter of the law. Additionally, one of Ionescu's proposals, regarding the establishment of an agricultural bank (Casa Rurală) won support from both parties.

=== Split with the Conservatives ===
He broke away from the Conservative Party and founded the Conservative-Democratic Party (Partidul Conservator-Democrat, PCD) in early 1908. This followed a move by mainstream Conservatives to marginalize the pro-Ionescu faction. The Takists organized themselves at a congress in Bucharest in February of that year and, especially through their section in the capital, were successful in several consecutive elections.

Upon the separation, Ionescu stated: "I have the deep conviction that Romania needs a conservative party, democratic in its makeup, progressive in its tendencies, but firmly representing the ideas of social conservation. This party must be strong, in order to form a counterbalance to the Left, which, fatally and as indicated by the times, will move more and more to the Left". He stressed his principles in opposing Socialism, indicating that he mistrusted its ability to reconcile with "maintaining freedom". Additionally, Ionescu made mention of reforming the census suffrage enshrined in the 1866 Constitution, and expressed support for a single electoral college to replace the three wealth-based ones in existence at the time.

The PCD was soon joined by Ion Luca Caragiale, who characterized Take Ionescu as "An indefatigable and wise patriot", by the future diplomat Nicolae Titulescu, by the doctor Constantin Istrati, the writer Barbu Ştefănescu-Delavrancea, the journalist Nicolae Xenopol, the former mayor of Iaşi Gheorghe Lascăr, the landowners Constantin Cantacuzino Paşcanu and Alexandru Bădărău, as well as by Xeni, who left a eulogistic account of his mentor. It became the target of attacks from both the PNL and the Conservatives, and was faced with the reticence of King Carol I. Nevertheless, Xeni contended, the new grouping profited from Ionescu's popularity with the lower strata of Romanian society, being identified as "one of their own". In this version of events, mainstream politicians allegedly convinced Carol that the PCD had an agenda to depose the ruling House of Hohenzollern-Sigmaringen, and had depicted Ionescu as "a 'Belzebuth' who was supposed to be removed from public life".

The PNL notably accused the Conservative-Democrats of having been instigated and financed by Mochi Fischer, one of the main leaseholders, whose land in Flămânzi had been the original center of agitation during the 1907 events. Among the points of contention between the PCD and the PNL were the 1908 expulsion of the socialist activist and România Muncitoare leader Christian Rakovsky (based on an order which the PCD considered illegal) and the unsuccessful 1909 reform advanced by Minister of Education Spiru Haret (which, among other things, prevented academics who taught Law from practicing, and created new university chairs, raising suspicions that these had been purposely designed to accommodate PNL members).

At the time, he became known as an Anglophile, and according to Xeni, adopted British manners in his private life, while being one of the few speakers of fluent English in his country. As a model for his own party, Take Ionescu cited the precedent set by Lord Randolph Churchill and his Tory Democracy in Britain.

=== Maiorescu government and the Balkan Wars ===
In late 1911, the PCD began talks for an alliance with the National Liberals, directed at the second Carp government, and opposed by King Carol (as it threatened to draw support for constitutional changes). Repeatedly calling on Carp to include PCD ministers in his executive, Ionescu sided with Brătianu in May 1911, during the scandal erupting over Bucharest's tram system (when the Conservatives uncovered that the former Mayor of Bucharest, Vintilă Brătianu, had contracted some of his fellow Liberals to complete the work in question). The matter escalated when Carp faced Parliament with a proposal for legislative changes, and publicly questioned Ion I. C. Brătianu's morality. The conflict prolonged itself over the following months, and ended with the fall of the Carp government and its replacement with a transitional one, headed by Maiorescu.

Eventually, in October 1912, Ionescu aided in the creation of a new executive comprising several Conservative tendencies and also led by Maiorescu, serving as Minister of Internal Affairs until December 1913. Before Romania intervened in the Second Balkan War and annexed Southern Dobruja, Ionescu attempted to persuade Bulgarian politician Stoyan Danev to accept ceding the region as compensation for incorporating Aromanian-inhabited territories. Later, he reviewed tentative proposals for Romania to occupy Bulgaria itself, and rejected them outright. Ionescu continued to advise caution in respect to his country's policies in the Balkans, and argued that Romania should not offend any of the three other kingdoms in the region (Bulgaria, Greece, and Serbia). Xeni argued that, In Ionescu's view, the Balkan Wars announced a conflict on a much larger scale.

The fall of the Titu Maiorescu executive in 1914, cover of Furnica magazine. Ion I. C. Brătianu and his ministers look on as Maiorescu plunges downstairs; the caption reads "Dear Titu, don't forget to give our compliments to Tăkiţă!"

His attitude on Balkan issues brought him the friendship of Greek Premier Eleftherios Venizelos. In November 1913, Ionescu left for Athens with King Carol's approval, mediating between the Ottoman envoy Mehmed Talat Pasha, a member of the Young Turks, and the Greek executive. He was received in triumph, and managed to seal a deal between the two states, receiving in return public thanks from both governments, as well as the honorary citizenship of Athens. Since the treaty was disadvantageous to defeated Bulgaria, Ionescu was allegedly the target of an assassination attempt (reportedly foiled by an ethnic Aromanian).

By early 1914, Ionescu became involved in a prolonged discussion with Luigi Luzzatti, former prime minister of Italy, who asked Romania to review its policies and allow Jewish Emancipation (see History of the Jews in Romania). He ultimately promised Luzzatti that all Jewish veterans of the Second Balkan War were going to be awarded Romanian citizenship, but the policy was overturned by the PNL's Ion I. C. Brătianu executive, coming to power in January 1914.

=== Outbreak of World War I ===
In late summer 1914, while traveling back from London and receiving news of World War I having erupted, Ionescu made a series of highly accurate predictions — he theorized that Italy, the United States, Japan and Romania itself were to be dragged into the conflict, that the Central Powers were to be initially victorious, and that, after a series of setbacks, "we shall get to see Greater Romania with our own eyes". Reportedly, he also foretold a worldwide rise in support for left-wing causes.

Ionescu initially supported Romania's neutrality. Nevertheless, unlike the main Conservative group, his PCD soon began intense advocacy of joining the war effort against the Central Powers, calling for Romania to incorporate the Austro-Hungarian-ruled regions of Transylvania, Banat, and Bukovina (Ionescu argued that Romania could not exist unless "we are straddling the Carpathians"). Defining the Austrian monarchy as "a sad nothingness", Ionescu expressed his opinion that the German Empire, Austria-Hungary's main ally, was gripped by the influence of Prussian "corporalism". Xeni recounted that Ionescu had displayed a degree of sympathy with King Carol's position, contending that the monarch was not entirely opposed to joining the Entente in its war effort.

According to one of the PCD's main opponents, the writer and journalist Tudor Arghezi, Ionescu changed his priorities on the very day King Carol convoked a Crown Council which confirmed neutrality policies (3 August 1914). In this version of events, the Conservative Democrat commented upon the necessity of supporting the Entente Powers just as he was leaving Peleş Castle; Arghezi commented with irony that: "before reaching the street, Mr. Take Ionescu had reviewed his ideas several times. [...] It would seem that Mr. Take Ionescu's ideas are stillborn, just like premature babies, born before their time and dead before having an age". He also expressed a view that the new policy was "demagogy", intended to bring the PCD into government ("Let all perish, as long as Mr. Take Ionescu succeeds!"), and contrasted Ionescu's claim to represent popular interest with his refusal to accept land reform and universal suffrage.

Similar views were expressed by the notorious socialist and Zimmerwald pacifist Christian Rakovsky, leader of the Social Democratic Party. Writing to his main collaborator Leon Trotsky in May 1915, he accused Ionescu of "making a political principle out of venality", and of being "a man of vulgar ambitions and unmeasurable vanity, a politician of no faith, no convictions, who considers political programs to be each a cause to plead". Contending that Take Ionescu aimed to be "on all occasions, on the winning side, courting people in power", Rakovsky believed that his support for the Entente was conjectural: "Until yesterday, [he] was the man who continuously tied friendships with the Germans [...]. Anticipating victory for the Allies, [he] has now become their man, and, finding it difficult to return to his old sympathies, he threatens that, in case Russia were to fail, he would expatriate himself to America, the Romanian people having lost, in the eyes of such a "patriot", all interest once he would no longer have the hope of returning to power". On the other side of the political spectrum, Ionescu remained at odds with the Conservative leader Petre P. Carp; in 1915, referring to his policies, Carp remarked: "Talent does not justify all avatars, just as beauty does not justify all forms of prostitution".

Seeking a settlement with Hungary over the territorial issue, Ionescu traveled to Budapest on one occasion, meeting with Miklós Bánffy: vehemently stating his goal of incorporating the regions into the Kingdom of Romania, he was answered that Austria-Hungary intended to extend its influence to the Black Sea (Ionescu recounted: "we agreed that we could never agree"). Ionescu kept close contacts with Entente politicians, and notably with the prominent French Radical-Socialist Georges Clemenceau, who described him as "a great European, albeit Romanian down to his marrow, having for his country the highest and most legitimate of ambitions". At the time, he deplored Eleftherios Venizelos' deposition from the office of prime minister (October 1915).

=== 1916 ===
Following Carol's death and Ferdinand I's ascension to the throne, his pro-Entente activism intensified. He was at the forefront of a major grouping of various public figures who, despite differences in politics, supported an alliance with France and Britain, including Nicolae Filipescu, Constantin Istrati, Octavian Goga, Vasile Lucaciu, Barbu Ştefănescu-Delavrancea, Nicolae Iorga, Simion Mândrescu, Ioan Cantacuzino, Nicolae Xenopol, N. D. Cocea, Constantin Mille, as well as Take Ionescu's brother Thoma. Their adversary Christian Rakovsky accused Mille, a former socialist, of using his two dailies, Adevărul and Dimineaţa, as venues for Takist propaganda, and claimed that this was accomplished "under the mask of independence" (additionally, he stated: "[Ionescu] thus compensated for the weakness of his party, both in men and ideas, through corrupting the press").

In late 1915, Ionescu and most like-minded activists formed a body known as Acţiunea Naţională ("National Action") or Federaţia unionistă ("Unionist Federation"). It found relative support from the new monarch, but his policies were rejected by the PNL cabinet of Ion I. C. Brătianu — although the latter force supported the Entente, it decided not to enter the war until the Entente powers were to recognize Romanian rule in Transylvania, Bukovina, and the Banat, as well as provide the country with military assistance. In contrast, Ionescu's attitude, as paraphrased by Stephen Bonsal, was: "Our role is that of an unconditional ally of the democracies. We must not drive a bargain. We should and can rely on the appreciation of our allies when the victory is won".

According to the PNL's Ion G. Duca, Brătianu, who was the main target of Acţiunea Naţională's criticism, "wrapped himself in an atmosphere of silence and played the sphinx". With Thoma Ionescu, Rector of the University of Bucharest, campaigning among academics, and with Take Ionescu maintaining contacts with the PNL minister Alexandru Constantinescu-Porcu, the Entente supporters were becoming increasingly influential by 1915. In late 1914, they successfully replaced the leadership of the Cultural League with a panel of Acţiunea Naţională members.

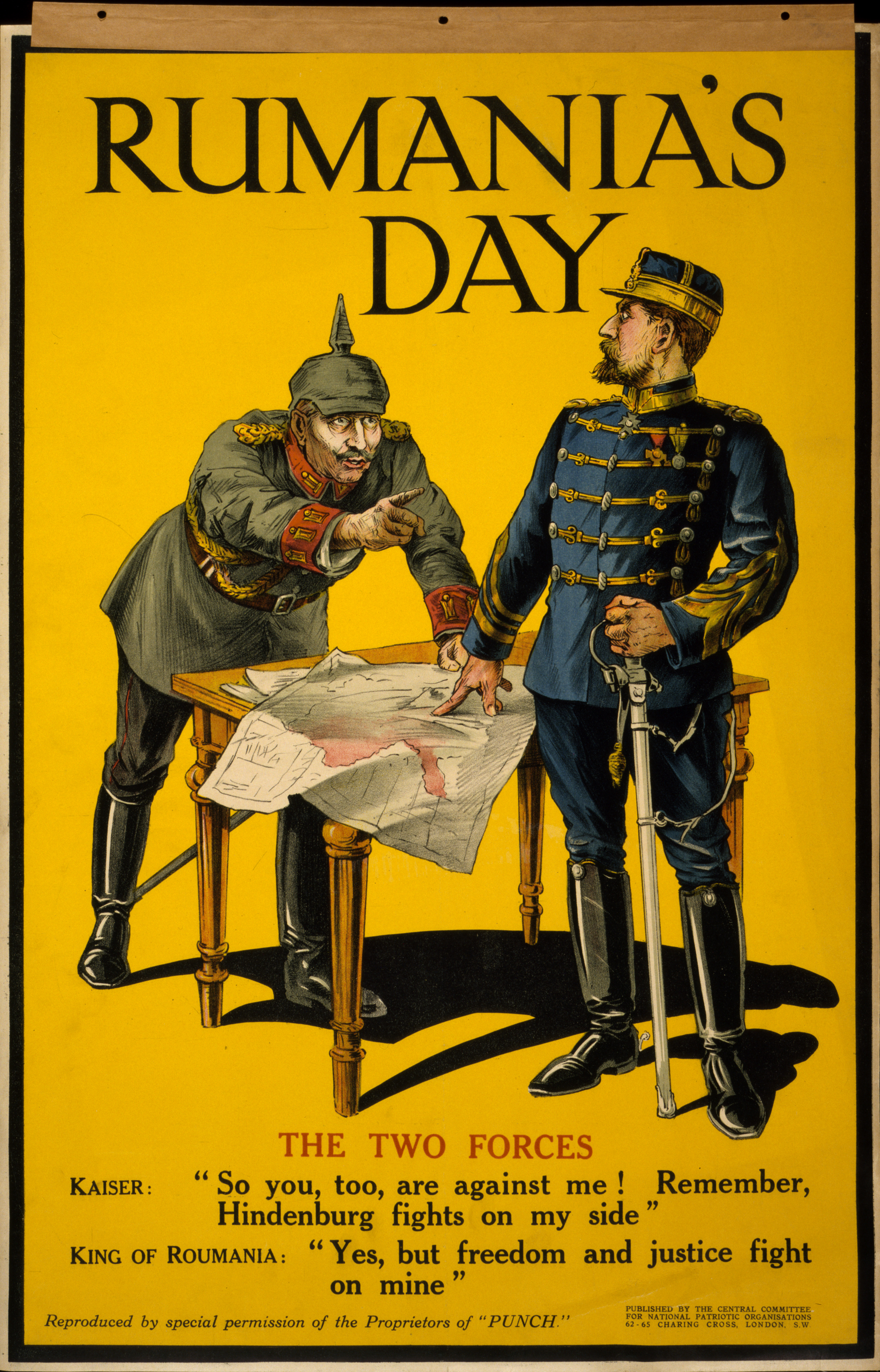
Romania's Day, a British 1916 poster based on a Punch cartoon, welcoming Romania's decision to enter the war (depicting an allegoric debate between German Emperor William II and Romania's Ferdinand I)

Eventually, after the Bucharest agreement was sealed, recognizing Romanian demands in front of the Entente, Brătianu approved of entering the conflict and agreed to declare war on the Central powers. On 7 August 1916, the matter was communicated to political leaders in a Crown Council held at Cotroceni Palace in Bucharest; Ionescu, who was visiting Sinaia together with the American military attaché Halsey E. Yates, rushed back to the capital after being invited by Constantinescu-Porcu. Being advised to maintain secrecy over the proceedings, he hid the reasons for his return by starting a rumor that the outbreak of typhoid fever in Sinaia had gotten out of control.

Other politicians attending the Council included several government ministers (Brătianu, Duca, Constantinescu-Porcu, Vasile Morţun, Emil Costinescu, Alexandru G. Radovici, Emanoil Porumbaru, Victor Antonescu, Constantin Anghelescu), Parliamentary leaders (Mihail Pherekyde, Constantin Robescu), former premiers (Titu Maiorescu, Theodor Rosetti, and Petre P. Carp), other party leaders (Nicolae Filipescu and Alexandru Marghiloman) and former Chamber presidents (Constantin Olănescu and Constantin Cantacuzino Paşcanu). Conservatives present voiced their disapproval, with Maiorescu as the most vocal opponent: Maiorescu and Brătianu notably engaged in a separate debate about whether Transylvanians had called on Romania to intervene — the former argued that no such call had been voiced, while Brătianu contended that he had support from over the border (Ionescu seconded this claim).

As most of the political leaders present at the meeting approved of the change in policy, Carp gave a short speech in which he refused to back Ferdinand's decision and wished "for Your Majesty's armies to be defeated", although commenting that he would "give Your Majesty my four sons, because Romanians are brave in the military". In a private conversation with Premier Brătianu, Take Ionescu contended that "[Carp] is Shakespearean in his error. He does not surprise me, given that I never took him seriously to begin with. You have taken him seriously, and this is your own fault".

=== Romanian Campaign ===
The country subsequently suffered a series of defeats and all its southern areas were occupied by the Central Powers (see Romanian Campaign). Ionescu followed Romanian authorities into refuge to the provisional capital of Iaşi, being hosted by C. Konya, a well-known pharmacist whose house was near the local university. Ionescu's house on Bucharest's Atena Street was ransacked and partly vandalized by German troops — Constantin Argetoianu recounted that this was accomplished "methodically", and constituted "an exception" to the German administration's "scrupulous respect for private property". According to Take Ionescu himself, his lodging had been destroyed on special orders from August von Mackensen in December 1916 (he also contrasted this action with his promise to protect the property of former German ambassador, Hilmar von dem Bussche-Haddenhausen, after he had left Bucharest earlier in the same year).

He was brought to office as a Vice-Premier and Minister Secretary of State (Minister without portfolio), in a War Cabinet headed by the PNL's leader Brătianu, serving between July 1917 and January 1918. According to Xeni, Ionescu's advocacy of an Entente alliance had made him the target of intense criticism, at a time when the territory still controlled by Romanian authorities was suffering major hardships, and replied that "war had to be made". At the same time, he and the premier agreed on the principles of electoral and land reform to be carried out in a future Romania, as the Conservatives appeared destined to lose appeal.

Romania ultimately signed a peace treaty with the Central Powers in 1918 — soon after, Ionescu received approval to leave for Paris and London. While passing through Ploieşti, his native city, he was reportedly booed by a crowd of opponents. After the Armistice with Germany, which signaled a change in fortunes, he began actively campaigning for the international recognition of Romania's union with Transylvania as advanced by the Romanian National Party, creating the National Romanian Council, grouping politicians from several regions, many of whom had opposed the separate peace (these included the Transylvanians Octavian Goga and Vasile Lucaciu), and supporting an anti-Hungarian alliance of Balkan states that played a part in creating the Little Entente.

In December, Ionescu met with Venizelos and the Czechoslovak leader Tomáš Masaryk to discuss a common approach; expressing support for Eastern European alliances while commenting on the unresolved dispute involving Romania and the Kingdom of Serbia, Masaryk confided in Stephen Bonsal that: "Solutions are still beyond our immediate reach, but I am confident that we have cleared ground for the co-operation at the Peace Conference".

Despite his intense activism, he was denied a presence in the Romanian delegation to the Conference, owing to his renewed conflict with Prime Minister Brătianu. This followed a major disagreement in policy, after the National Liberals decided not to accept all Allied resolution on principle, and instead to renegotiate Romania's position on the international stage. In December 1919, answering to concerns that he was leading a risky path, Brătianu spoke out in Parliament against what he saw as demeaning "the role [the Romanian people] should have in the world".

Following Bessie Ionescu's death in a horse-riding accident, Ionescu married Alexandrina Ecaterina Woroniecki in 1919 (she was also known as Adina Olmazu). Also in that year, he published a volume of French-language essays and memoirs; going through an English edition, it was first published in Romania in 1923.

=== Alliance with Averescu ===
He returned to his country in autumn 1919, with a design to form a single political group of democratic persuasion, stressing Conservative accomplishments (such as selling state land to peasants and confiscating mainmorte estates), while aiming to persuade the PNL to back electoral reform. During his stay in Paris, while the main Conservative Party disintegrated, the PCD had itself suffered a major crisis; according to Ionescu's rival and one-time political partner Constantin Argetoianu, Ionescu's temporary residence on Calea Victoriei subsequently became a meeting place for various Conservative politicians (whom Argetoianu repeatedly described as "Conservative wrecks").

Eventually, in 1919, Ionescu's group formed an alliance with the newly created People's League, headed by General Alexandru Averescu. Averescu, who was celebrated for his wartime command of the Romanian Army, shared several viewpoints with the PCD and, according to Argetoianu's ironic version of events, "a great, albeit undisclosed, spiritual affinity: they both belonged to the reptilian class". The alliance went through two stages: early in the year, the PCD signed an electoral pact with Averescu's grouping — the People League's Argetoianu, who led the talks, later indicated that he had sabotaged all possibility of an actual merger, believing it to be detrimental to his grouping; in autumn, the newly returned Ionescu met with the general to discuss a project for increased cooperation. At the time, Argetoianu indicated, Ionescu viewed himself as a favorite of the Allied governments, and, while maintaining close relations with Averescu, refused to discuss a fusion. Reportedly, Averescu unsuccessfully offered Ionescu the League's presidency in exchange for being recognized as the main candidate for the premiership. The PCD leader changed his attitude as it became apparent that Averescu, who was appointed prime minister by Ferdinand, was set to win the elections, and, according to Constantin Argetoianu, had to allow Averescu the upper hand in the deal.

The PCD came to power following the landslide victory in the 1920 election (when the PCD won 17 seats in addition to the People Party's 206). Take Ionescu was again brought to a cabinet position between 1920 and 1921, replacing Duiliu Zamfirescu as Foreign Minister in the Averescu cabinet. Argetoianu indicated that the PCD had not been part of the original cabinet makeup due to Averescu's maneuvers: reportedly, the general presented his group as the main candidate in the elections, and allowed the Conservative-Democrats to have a share in government only after he was validated by the popular vote. Expanding on this issue, Argetoianu stated: "Take Ionescu hoped to achieve popularity through his activity in Paris and thus impose himself either at the top, in spheres of the [Royal] Palace, or at the bottom, in the popular masses. Unfortunately for him, he found no vacant spot either up or down. At the top, Brătianu remained adamantly, as always, the person of trust, and at the bottom Averescu's popularity, with its fetishistic character, allowed no one to present even the most limited of challenges. Take Ionescu, for all his merits and for all his intelligence, was doomed to continue his career as a trailer and hung on to Averescu, as his collaborator".

=== Foreign Minister and premiership ===
The appointment came at a time when his Little Entente project had already been fulfilled, and extended, from the Romanian perspective, through the alliance with the Second Polish Republic (see Polish–Romanian alliance). According to journalist Noti Constantinide, who visited him during his stay in Aix-les-Bains (March 1921), Ionescu, whom he called "the most intelligent person I ever met", was actively promoting the Romanian and Little Entente causes, seeking to sway public opinion in Allied countries. Through Constantinide, Ionescu was informed that Charles, former Emperor of Austria and King of Hungary, had decided in favor of secretly returning to Budapest and taking back one of his thrones; the information, according to Constantinide, was passed to him by an Austrian officer in Hungary's service, who had decided to betray his superiors. The information proved accurate, but Ionescu reportedly dismissed similar news, received some time after, of Charles' planning a second such attempt — this was to be effected in October, and, although more successful than the March episode, it too ended in Charles' expulsion (see Charles IV of Hungary's conflict with Miklós Horthy).

He began looking for an agreement with Bolshevist Russia over the issue of Bessarabia and the Romanian Treasure, but bilateral relations remained tense. Inside the cabinet, Ionescu successfully promoted Nicolae Titulescu (for the Finance portfolio) and Dimitrie Greceanu (for Public Works), but had to accept the former's resignation in late 1920, after Titulescu cited irreconcilable differences in political ideology (declaring himself to be much more left-wing than his party's chief) and reproached Ionescu the fact that he had intervened in financial affairs.

The Averescu executive, maneuvered by Brătianu and meeting with stiff opposition from the Romanian National, Peasants' and Democratic Nationalist parties, was ultimately brought down by Take Ionescu himself, through his resignation from office on 11 December 1921. This came as the project for land reform provoked a standoff in Parliament, after the PNL persuaded King Ferdinand that Averescu had to resign, and Ionescu agreed to induce an artificial crisis for the general to hand over his mandate.

Ionescu was ultimately prime minister for one month, from 17 December 1921, until 17 January 1922. In this capacity, he oversaw the marriage agreement between King Alexander I of the Serbs, Croats and Slovenes and Princess Maria. He resigned after a motion of no confidence, which Ferdinand hoped to see bringing Averescu back to power, but was instead faced with a new PNL majority, formed after the 1922 elections.

=== Death ===
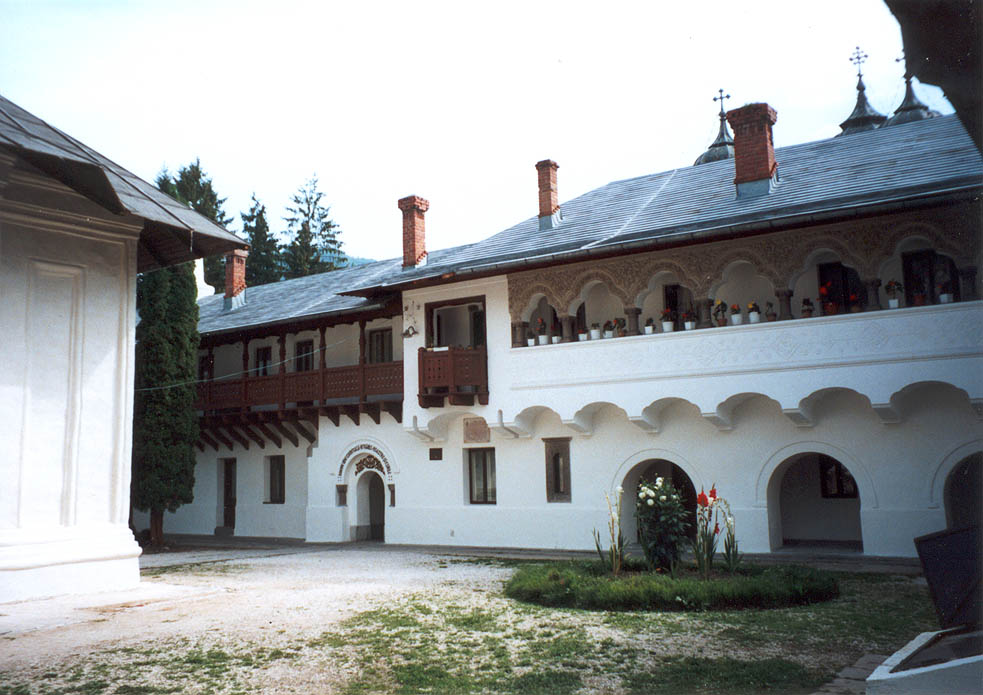
The inner courtyard of Sinaia Monastery

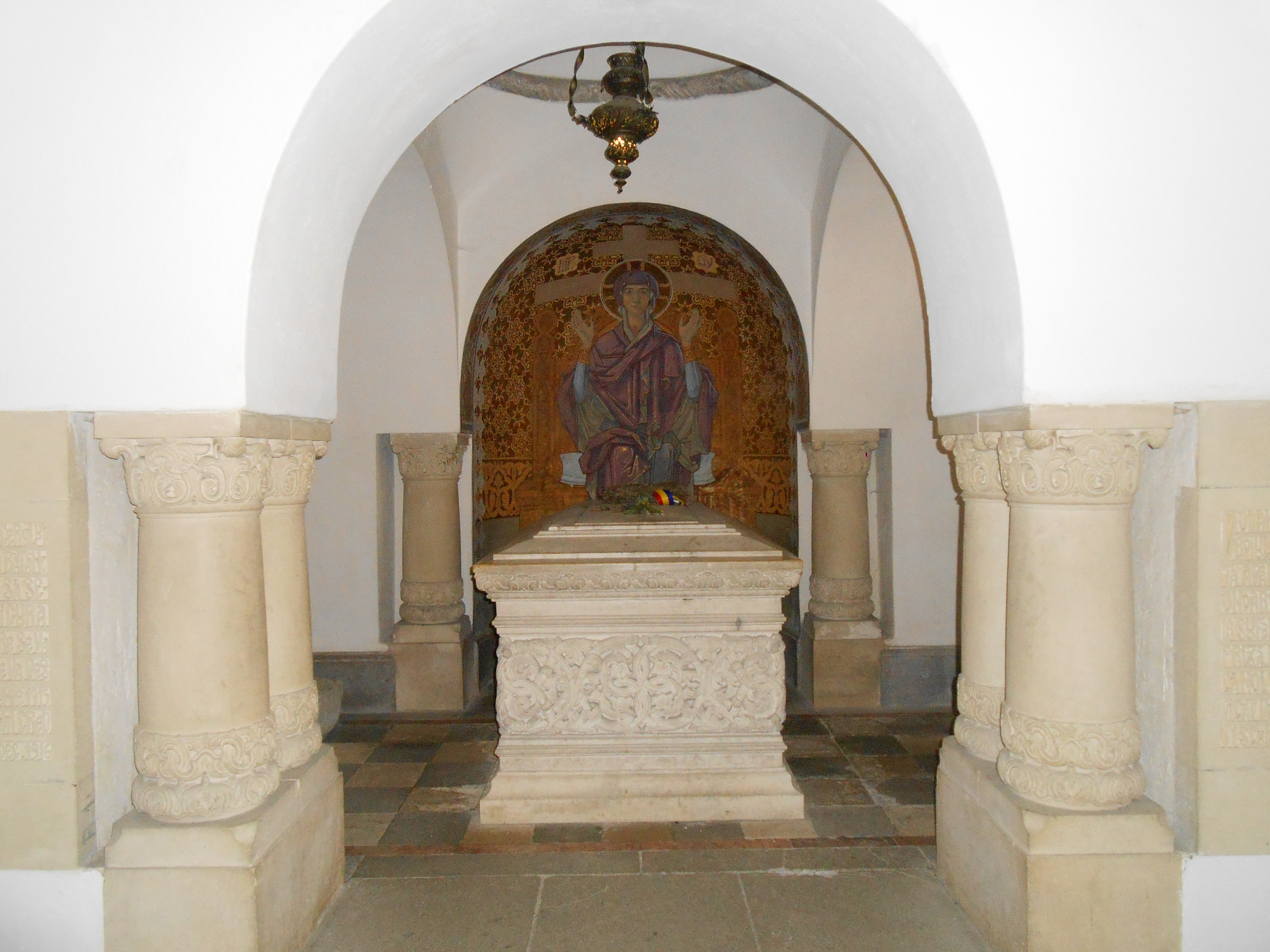
Tomb of Take Ionescu at Sinaia Monastery

While visiting Italy in summer 1922, Take Ionescu contracted typhoid fever, and died at a sanitarium on Rome's Via Toscana (according to sources, he had contracted the disease while in Naples, having eaten an infected oyster, and fell ill while crossing into Sicily). The final diagnosis was "typhic ulcerous aortitis and internal abdominal angina". The unusual circumstances of his illness provoked scientific interest, and, during the early 1920s, it was discussed in medical circles as the "Take Ionescu disease".

Returning from the League of Nations in Geneva, Brătianu paid a visit to the moribund Ionescu, and reportedly acknowledged the merits of his Balkan projects ("You were right, Mr. Ionescu. Having witnessed the chaos in Geneva, I had [instead] the opportunity of seeing of just how much help the creation and solidarity of the Little Entente has been to us").

The train transporting his remains was saluted by Serb officials when passing through their country, and received in Bucharest with the sirens of several locomotives blowing in unison (as a sign of respect). The casket, wrapped in the Romanian tricolor, was displayed in the Romanian Athenaeum building for several days. A public procession, led by King Ferdinand, accompanied the casket, placed on a caisson, down to Bucharest's Gara de Nord, whence it was transported for burial in Sinaia (30 June 1922).

Ionescu was buried in the inner courtyard of Sinaia Monastery, inside a marble crypt having quotes from his speeches carved into its walls, and in the vicinity of a fir tree planted in 1848 by a group of Wallachian revolutionaries (one of whom was Ionescu's ancestor Ion Heliade Rădulescu). The grave site had been previously donated by the Romanian state to Alexandrina Ecaterina Woroniecki.

== Legacy ==
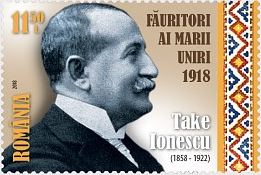
Ionescu on a 2018 stamp of Romania

Spiritele anului 3000, authored when Ionescu was just 17, is thought to be one of the first works of science fiction in Romanian literature. Written as a first-person narrative and dream sequence, it depicts its author and main character falling into slumber and awaking on the close of the 30th century. The world he encounters is peopled by humans of a small stature, who reach full maturity at the age of 15. Spiritele anului 3000 is part political satire and part political project. Humanity is unified into a single confederation of republics and administrated from Liberty (a completely new capital built up on an artificial island in the Mediterranean Sea), while monarchies and wars have disappeared altogether. Romania is set "in her natural borders" through the intervention of a Supreme Tribunal, while the Romanian language adopts a form to Ionescu's liking (having shunned the more artificial etymology favored by Transylvanian intellectuals and the Romanian Academy alike). The Romanian climate is improved by afforestation, the country is spanned by canals, and the garden-like Bucharest, over which the narrator and Aru, his friend from the future, fly in a moored balloon, no longer has any churches left standing.

The Conservative-Democratic Party did not survive the death of its leader, and disbanded over the same year. According to his one-time political ally Octavian Goga, Ionescu "concentrated within him the character of improvised Muntenian bourgeoisie". Praising him for his qualities while also contending that his discourse "bordered on demagogy", Goga stated "I do not believe, though, that he could have ever gone as far in a Western country or in a balanced country such as England". He described their relationship thus: "He did all sorts of favors for me, he won me money loans, he promised me a ministry from the very beginning, he declared me 'a genius' in his article for La Roumanie, — I nonetheless remained, in front of him, as I would remain in front of a woman who in vain tries to earn my love, as she does not project an image of moral responsibility".

Writing on the nomenclature used in the works of Ion Luca Caragiale, the literary critic Garabet Ibrăileanu noted the use and special meaning of pet forms. Commenting, among others, on the banality of the names "Take"/"Tache" and "Ionescu", he contended that Ionescu had transported the moniker into general acceptance, out of the reach of its familiar connotations: "«Take Ionescu» is utterly banal [...], but this name, due to the person who bore it, has gained through association a special prestige. This is why, if we were to see it today being used by a common Ionescu, the occurrence would seem comical to us". Expanding on this issue, he noted that both the derisive tone in Caragiale's works and Ionescu's career reflected, each in its own way, the growth in importance of a single social class, the "national bourgeoisie".

Take Ionescu's enduring admiration and support for countries in the Anglosphere and for the British Empire was reflected in contemporary popular culture. As Xeni indicated, Ionescu was depicted in satirical works either as an English "sportsman" or "an immense cylinder wrapped up in the stars of the American flag"). Ionescu's popularity before and during World War I also made him the center of a cultural trend, and the subject of imitation. According to Tudor Arghezi, he was personally responsible for raising the prestige of Ştefan Luchian, an impoverished painter, being among the first ever to purchase more than one of the latter's paintings.

The friendship between Ionescu and Eleftherios Venizelos left behind its own artistic legacy: in late 1913 or early 1915, the Ionescu residence in Bucharest was decorated with a stone bas-relief of the goddess Athena, which was inlaid into the masonry. Additionally, after Take Ionescu's death, Venizelos donated a bloc of Parian marble to be used for the politician's bust (ultimately placed inside the Chamber quarters on Mitropoliei Hill), and another marble bloc to be used for his grave in Sinaia Monastery.

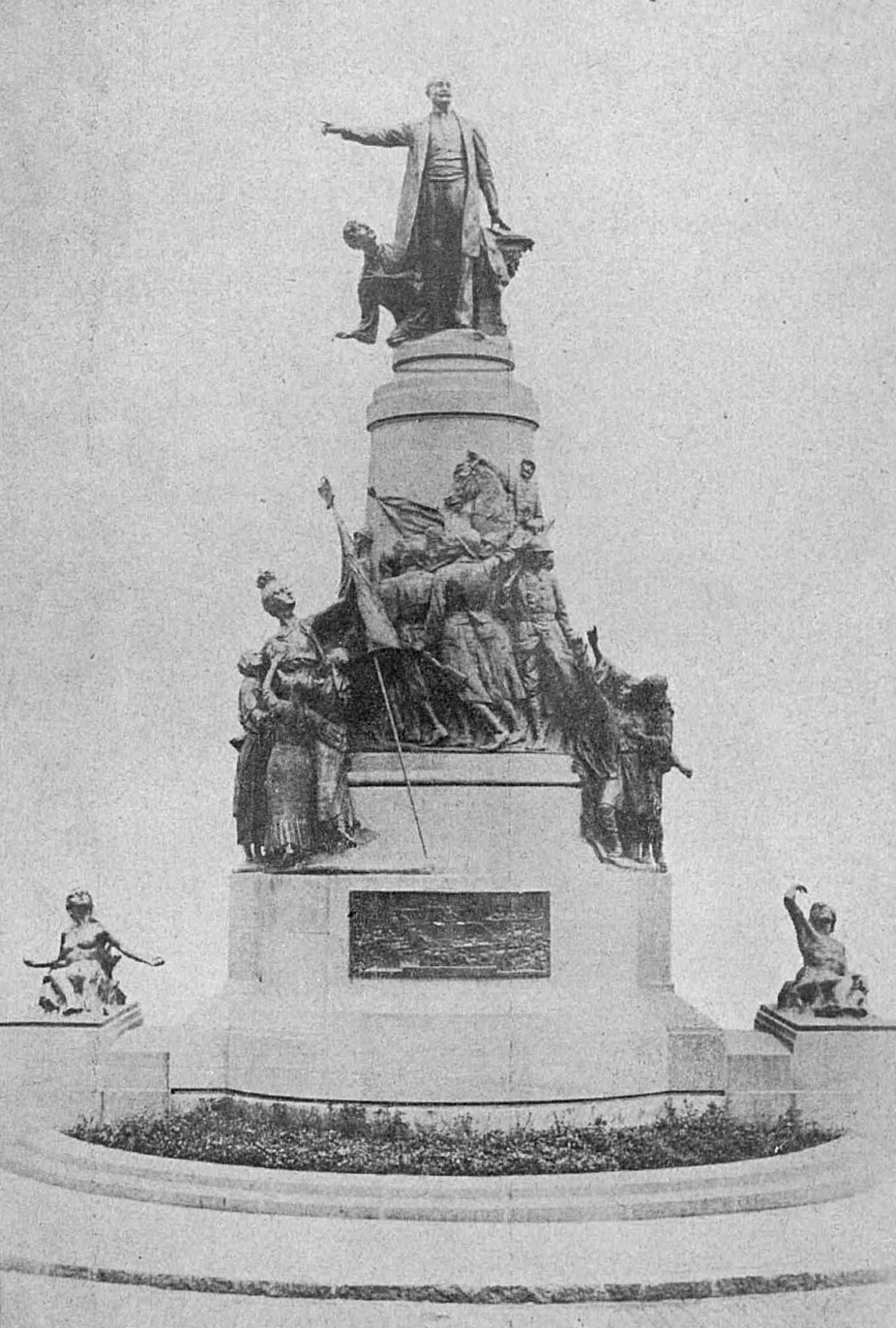
Monument to Ionescu from 1931, by Ernest Henri Dubois

Immediately after Ionescu's 1913 mission to Greece, the street he lived on was renamed Atena (Romanian for "Athens"). A section of the present-day Magheru Boulevard in Bucharest was initially named in Ionescu's honor. Undergoing a name change during the Communist period, a section of the former Atena Street was assigned the name Take Ionescu in the wake of the 1989 Revolution. Atena Street housed a large statue of Take Ionescu, the work of French sculptor Ernest Henri Dubois, depicting him standing alongside two female nudes, representing the ideal borders of Greater Romania (the Dniester and the Tisza), and pointing toward Transylvania. The monument was notably criticized by architectural historian Grigore Ionescu, who argued that it was "an inferior replica of Ion Brătianu's monument". (Both monuments were subsequently demolished by the communist authorities.)

Under the Communist regime, Alexandrina Ecaterina Woroniecki was allowed to continue residing in the house Ionescu had built for her in the proximity of Şoseaua Kiseleff, but had to share her lodging with a section of the Republican Art Museum, and was assigned a room on the underground floor.
