= Alexandru Djuvara =

Romanian writer, journalist and politician (1858–1913)

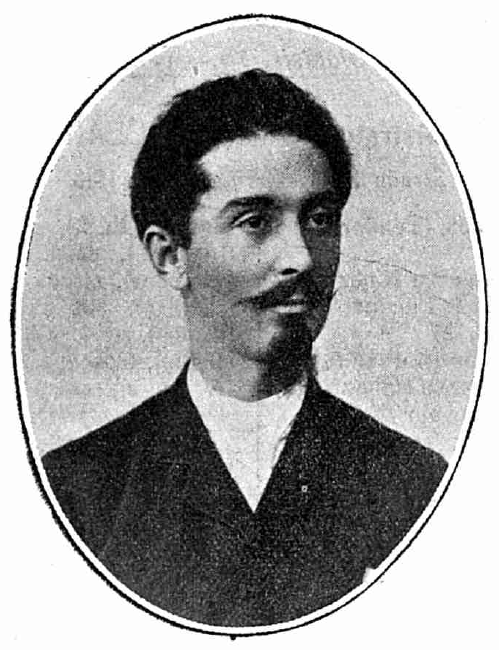
- Alexandru Djuvara (1910)

Minister of Foreign Affairs of Romania
- In office 1 November 1909 – 28 December 1910
- Monarch: Carol I of Romania
- Preceded by: Ion I. C. Brătianu
- Succeeded by: Titu Maiorescu

Personal details
- Born: 20 December 1858 Bucharest, Wallachia
- Died: 1 February 1913 (aged 54) Bucharest, Romania

Alexandru Djuvara (Romanian pronunciation: [alekˈsandru dʒjuˈvara]; 20 December 1858 – 1 February 1913) was a Romanian writer, journalist and politician.

== Early years ==
Djuvara was born in Bucharest on 20 December 1858. He was the uncle of prominent Romanian historian Neagu Djuvara, whose father was descended from an aristocratic Aromanian family.

After graduation from Lycée Louis-le-Grand in Paris, he went on to study Law in the School of History and Political Science. Having completed his law studies, Djuvara studied engineering at Paris Polytechnical School.

== Political career ==
Djuvara served as the Minister of Foreign Affairs of Romania from 1 November 1909 until 28 December 1910 under the reign of Romanian King Carol I. He also served as the Minister of Industry and Commerce.

He died on 1 February 1913 in Bucharest.

== See also ==
- Foreign relations of Romania
