= Lazăr Șăineanu =

Romania philologist, linguist (1859–1934)

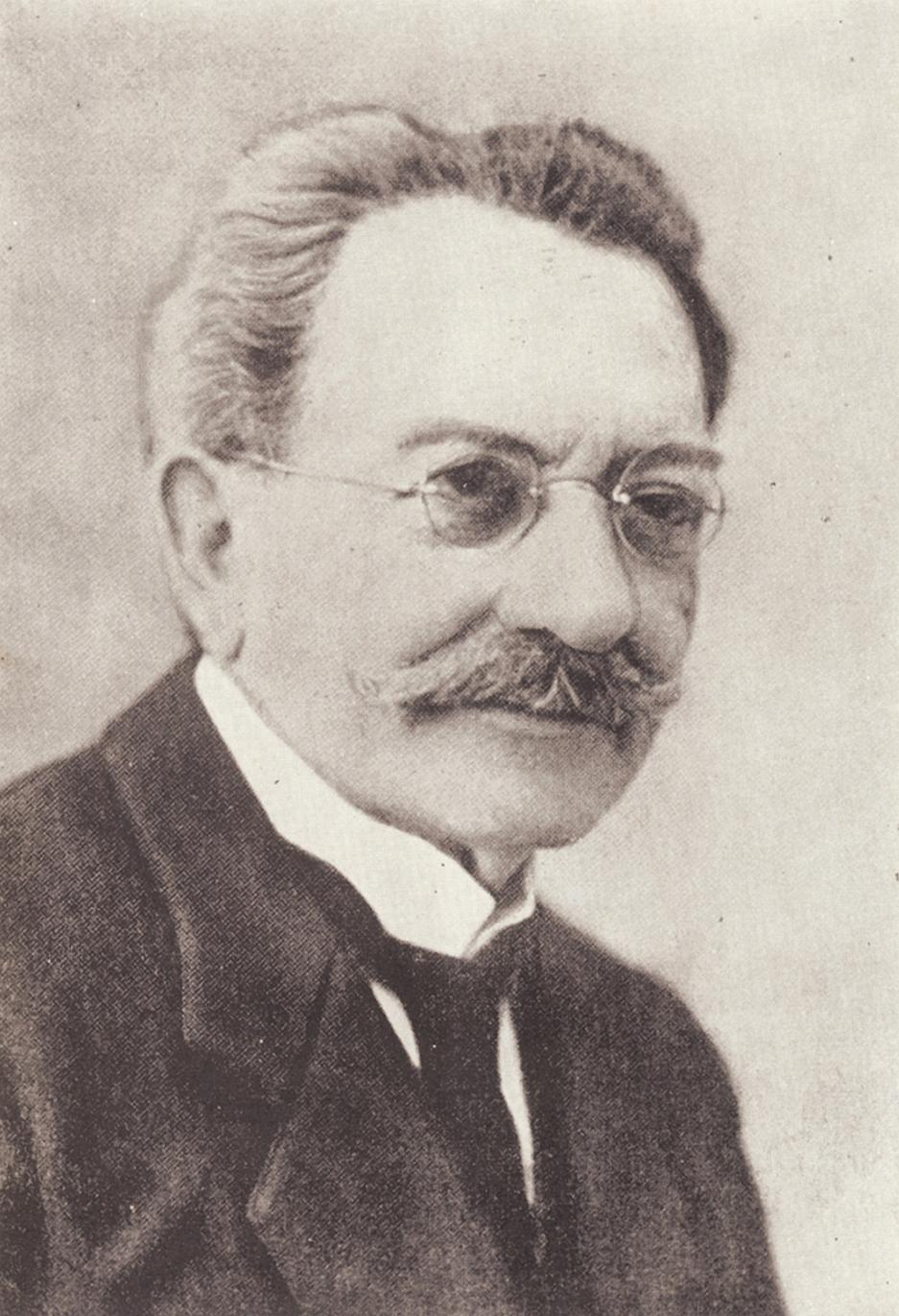
- Born: April 23, 1859; Ploiești, United Principalities of Moldavia and Wallachia
- Died: May 11, 1934 (aged 75); Paris, France
- Other names: Eliezer Schein; Lazare Sainéan; Lazare Sainéanu

Philosophical work
- Era: 19th century, early 20th century
- Region: Europe
- School: Evolutionary linguistics
- Main interests: Comparative linguistics; dialectology; philology; lexicography; semasiology; argot; Romance languages; Yiddish

Lazăr Șăineanu (Romanian pronunciation: [ˈlazər ʃəiˈne̯anu], also spelled Șeineanu, born Eliezer Schein; Francisized Lazare Sainéan, French pronunciation: [lazaʁ sa.ine.ɑ̃], or Sainéanu; April 23, 1859 – May 11, 1934) was a philologist, linguist, folklorist and cultural historian born in the United Principalities of Moldavia and Wallachia, today part of Romania. A specialist in Oriental and Romance studies, as well as a Germanist, he was primarily known for his contribution to Yiddish and Romanian philology, his work in evolutionary linguistics, and his activity as a literary and philological comparatist. Șăineanu also had innovative contributions to the investigation and anthologizing of Romanian folklore, placed in relation to Balkan and East Central European traditions, as well as to the historical evolution of Romanian in a larger Balkan context, and was a celebrated early contributor to Romanian lexicography. His main initiatives in these fields are a large corpus of collected fairy tales and the 1896 Dicționarul universal al limbii române ("The Universal Dictionary of the Romanian Language"), which have endured among the most popular Romanian scientific works.

A member of the non-emancipated Jewish-Romanian community, Lazăr Șăineanu stood for the Haskalah (Jewish Enlightenment) ideas, and opted in favour of Jewish assimilation into the Romanian mainstream. His repeated requests for naturalisation were eventually unsuccessful, but propelled him to the center of a political conflict which opposed the antisemitic current to the advocates of tolerance. In 1901, Șăineanu and his family left the Kingdom of Romania and resettled in France, where the scholar lived until his death. Becoming known for his pioneering work to the study of Middle French and his investigations into the origins of argot, as well as for his critical essays on 16th-century writer François Rabelais, he was a recipient of the Institut de France's Volney Prize in 1908. The son-in-law of publisher Ralian Samitca, Șăineanu was survived by his brother Constantin, a noted lexicographer, journalist and polemicist.

== Biography ==
=== Early life ===
Eliezer Schein (whose name was originally rendered in Romanian as Lazăr Șain or Shain) was born in the city of Ploiești to impoverished Jewish-Romanian residents. His father, Moisi, was a house painter and amateur artist, who, by the time his son was sixteen, had left to work in the United States. Eliezer studied with private tutors from the age of 5, and was admitted into regular school at the age of 10, when he entered second grade. Moisi Schein died shortly after returning to Romania, leaving Eliezer the sole provider for his mother and six siblings. He was however able to pass his Baccalaureate, with a thesis on writer and theorist Ion Heliade Rădulescu: Ioan Eliad Rădulescu ca grămătic și filolog ("Ioan Eliad Rădulescu as a Grammarian and Philologist").

By 1881, having been exempted from his compulsory term in the Romanian Land Forces as the eldest son of a widow, the young man went on to study at the University of Bucharest's Faculty of Letters. Taught and regarded with admiration by academic Bogdan Petriceicu Hasdeu, Șăineanu was primarily a student of etymology, stylistics and semantics (which formed the basis of his first three studies, published in 1882 and 1887). He published his first study, the 1883 Câteva specimene de etimologie populară română ("A Few Samples of Romanian Folk Etymology"), in Hasdeu's magazine Columna lui Traian. By then, Șăineanu had begun contributing to Anuar pentru Israeliți ("The Yearbook for Israelites"), the Hebraist magazine edited by his friends and fellow scholars Moses Gaster and Moses Schwartzfeld, which mainly published articles on Jewish history and espoused a moderate assimilationist agenda (Haskalah). Gaster also sent Șăineanu's various studies on folklore and linguistics also published in Revista pentru Istorie, Arheologie și Filologie, a review founded and led by Romanian historian Grigore Tocilescu. The direct contacts between the two scholars ended in 1885, when Gaster was expelled from Romania for protesting against the antisemitic measures condoned by the National Liberal Party cabinet of Ion Brătianu.

The 1887 Încercare asupra semasiologiei române ("Essay on Romanian Semasiology"), presented by Schein as his graduation paper, was retrospectively commended by ethnologist Iordan Datcu for its innovative value, and argued by the same commentator to have attracted universally positive reactions from "objective critics". According to Șăineanu's account, it followed closely after semasiology itself had been established as an independent branch by the French academic Michel Bréal. It reportedly earned him the praise of a future adversary the Education Minister and National Liberal politician Dimitrie Sturdza, who allegedly recommended him to study abroad, reassuring him that, unlike in Gaster's case, "we will receive you back with open arms." Printed by the Romanian Academy's press and prefaced by Hasdeu, Încercare earned Șăineanu the Manoah Hillel scholarship, amounting to 5,000 lei in gold.

Using this grant, he furthered his studies in France, at the University of Paris, under Bréal, Gaston Paris and Wilhelm Meyer-Lübke, and later at the École Spéciale des Langues Orientales, where he specialized in the study of Oriental languages. He received his Ph.D. at the University of Leipzig, in the German Empire, his dissertation receiving an award from the Institut de France. According to historian Lucian Nastasă, the scholar's choice was confirming a common practice of Romanians, who opted to bridge the gap between Francophilia and Germanophilia by frequenting venues in both countries. As Șăineanu wrote to Gaster, he had decided in favor of the "intellectual center" Leipzig because Karl Brugmann, "the leading representative of present-day linguistics", worked and taught there. He studied with both Brugmann and August Leskien, earning much praise for his work and the right to take his diploma under special circumstances (which took into consideration his previous works, and did not require him to research a full-sized new thesis). Șăineanu was pleased with the scientific rigor of his German teachers, but believed the system to suffer greatly in the matter of pedagogy, and considered French academics much more talented in this respect. The young scholar published two works during the interval: Legenda Meșterului Manole la grecii moderni ("The Meșterul Manole Legend among the Modern Greeks") and his Ph.D. thesis on Romanian folklore, Les Jours d'emprunt ou les jours de la vieille ("The Borrowed Days or The Old Woman's Days"). The latter was hosted by Gaston Paris' journal Romania.

=== Beginnings as a teacher ===
He returned to Romania as a teacher of Latin and Romanian, pursuing a career path which eventually earned him a position at Bucharest University. He was given employment as a high school teacher, and obtained an unpaid university position as assistant to Hasdeu, head of the Department of Letters. Nastasă, who notes Șăineanu's enthusiasm for his work, writes: "His opening lecture for the Comparative Philology course—like all of his work—is a proof of erudition more or less unparalleled within the areas of Romania."

Despite his qualifications, Șăineanu was unable to advance professionally because of his non-citizen status. The young researcher was also appointed substitute teacher of Latin in Bucharest Gheorghe Lazăr High School by an administrative decision of the Education Ministry, taken despite the antisemitic protestations of Undersecretary Ștefan Michăilescu. His assignment to the post followed the intercession of his friend and former teacher, the writer and archeologist Alexandru Odobescu, and inaugurated a short period during which Șăineanu focused on writing textbooks.

Shortly afterward, Conservative Minister Titu Maiorescu, leader of the influential literary club Junimea and himself one of Lazăr Șăineanu's former professors, appointed him to a position at the university, within the History and Literature Department of V. A. Urechia. The latter, an outspoken antisemite and prominent member of the opposition National Liberal group, reacted strongly against the measure, launching that claim that, unlike an ethnic Romanian, a Jew "could never awaken in the mind and heart of the young generation the image of our past laden with lessons for the future". According to Șăineanu's own recollection, he had not himself asked for the university appointment, and suspected that it was offered to him in the first place so that the Gheorghe Lazăr position would be assigned to "a favorite of the day, the former tutor of Prince Ferdinand." He nevertheless noted that Urechia had a conflict of interest when opposing his appointment, given that he had designed the department around his own chairmanship, and that, with the aid of University of Iași academic Alexandru D. Xenopol, he had set in motion a set of "miserable intrigues" to maintain his hold on the faculty.

Șăineanu also commented on the alleged oscillations of Tocilescu, who, after agreeing to lead the History section upon its recommended division, and supporting his Jewish colleague for chairmanship of the Letters section, threw his support behind Urechia. Nastasă, who mentions the scheming on the part of Urechia and Tocilescu, cites Moses Gaster's letter to Șăineanu, which defined Tocilescu as a double-crosser, "a filthy twicer and a bloodsucker". The complications eventually led Șăineanu to present his resignation, and Maiorescu to accept it. He recalled: "Every reasonable man would doubtlessly assume that [...] the resentment Mr. Urechia held against this unfortunate nomination would have been appeased. To assume thus would mean not to know the person or the Romanian social environment well enough, for barely two months had passed before grandiose patriotism again displayed the effects of its hatred."

The young linguist also contributed to Convorbiri Literare, a magazine edited by Junimea. It was there that, in 1887, he published his study on the Khazars' possible presence in Romanian folklore: Jidovii sau Tătarii sau Uriașii ("The Jews or the Tatars or the Uriași"). Produced on the basis of folkloric surveys in Muntenian and Oltenian localities such as Dragoslavele, Schitu Golești and Radomir, the study was later used against him by his political adversaries, who resented the implications it seemed to carry for the traditional relations between Jews and Romanians.

=== Scholarly prominence and early naturalization efforts ===
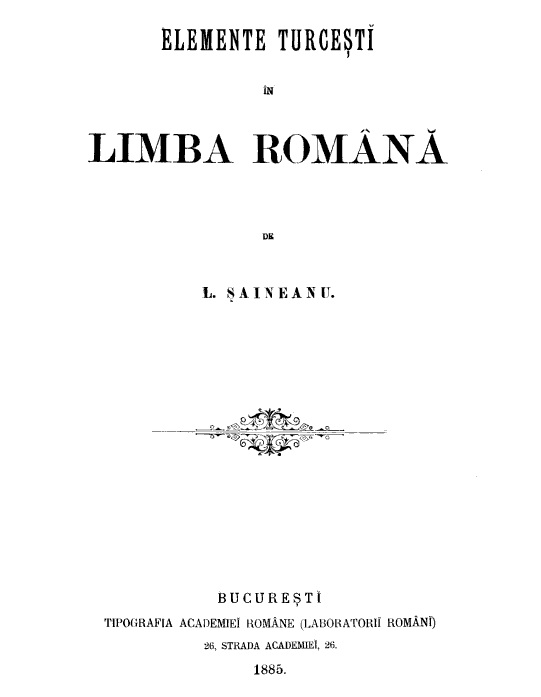
First page of Elemente turcești în limba română, 1885

By that moment in his career, Șăineanu was also publishing several books on comparative linguistics. Initially, he focused on assessing the impact of Turkish and Ottoman Turkish on the mainly Romance Aromanian language, producing the 1885 study Elemente turcești în limba aromână ("Turkish Elements in the Aromanian Language"). In 1889, he published his innovative work on the links between German and Yiddish, Studiu dialectologic asupra graiului evreo-german ("A Dialectologic Study on Judeo-German Speech"). His recognized field of expertise, Nastasă notes, was by then the widest in Romania, comprising not just Yiddish and Romance linguistics, but also the study Proto-Indo-European, Proto-Slavic and various other languages and dialects.

Also in 1889, Șăineanu applied for naturalization, which, according to the 1866 Constitution, a Jew could only receive by special act of the Romanian Parliament and in exchange for exceptional merits. The effort, which consumed some 12 years of his life, pitted him against the antisemitic current in politics and the scientific community: among the most vocal adversaries of his naturalization were two prominent National Liberals, Urechia and Sturdza, both of whom had a following among nationalist sections of the electorate. As head of the parliamentary commission on legal integration, Sturdza signed a recommendation to reject the proposed law, which had been previously approved by Justice Minister George D. Vernescu, on grounds that Șăineanu lacked qualifications. Their campaign, which depicted Șăineanu as an adversary of Romania, culminated when Senate voted 79 to 2 against the naturalization request.

The resistance to his application was a surprise for Șăineanu, who wrote: "I was not aware that this path [...] is the more thorny as the [person's] merits are more real." He also accused the political establishment of endemic corruption, writing: "any banker who demanded naturalization received it without the least of difficulties". During the following interval, Șăineanu's cause reportedly won the support of King Carol I, Conservative Premier Lascăr Catargiu and moderate National Liberal politico Mihail Kogălniceanu. Reviewing the situation, Șăineanu cited an unusual incident in neighboring Austria-Hungary, where local Romanians were demanding increased group rights as part of the Memorandum movement. Their arguments about cultural repression were met with the reply of Hungarian intellectuals, who cited the Șăineanu issue as proof that Austria-Hungary had more to offer than Romania: "He had all of Romania on his case, but he had rendered [the country] as many services as most Romanian demigods." In 1893, the naturalization request came before the lower chamber, resulting in a vote of 76 in favor to 20 against. According to the scholar's recollections, his only adversary in this forum was his former Convorbiri Literare colleague, writer Iacob Negruzzi, who reportedly stated the unsupported claim that Șăineanu had campaigned against Romania "in English" (Șăineanu believed that this was "doubtlessly" stated "because [English] was completely unfamiliar to the majority of Chamber members").

=== Parallel controversies and 1895 Senate vote ===
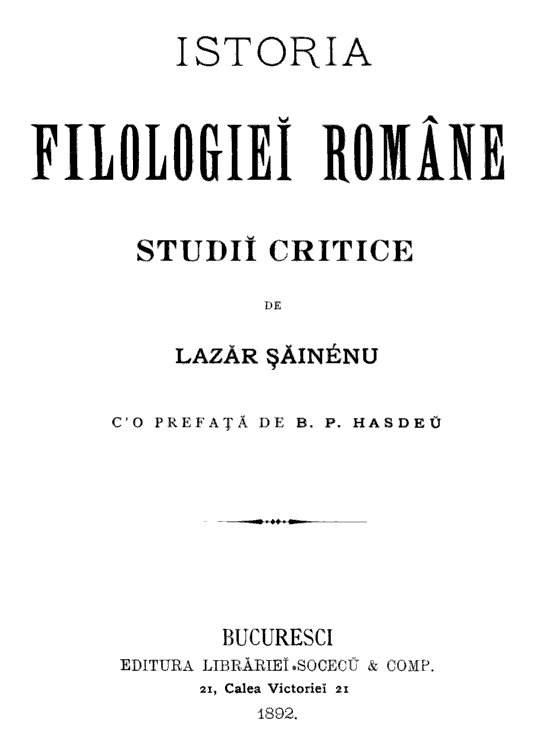
First page of Istoria filologiei române, studii critice with a preface by Bogdan Petriceicu Hasdeu, 1892

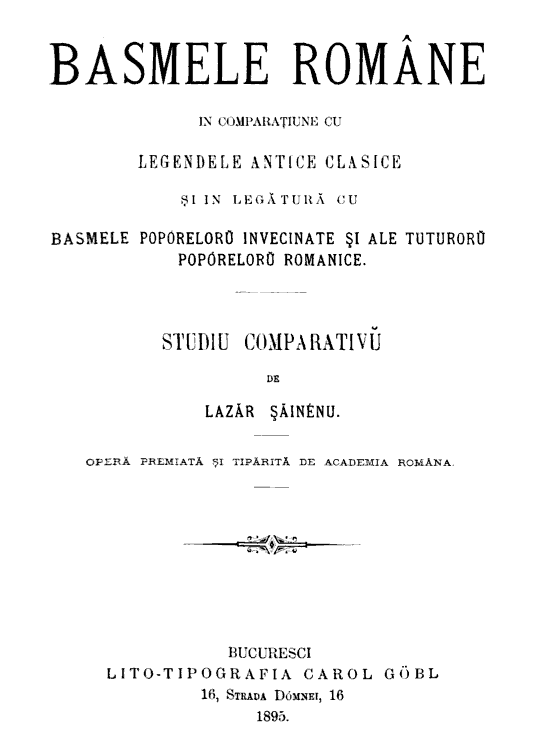
First page of Basmele române în comparațiune cu legendele antice clasice și în legătură cu basmele popoarelor învecinate și ale tuturor popoarelor romanice, 1895

Despite his involvement in a political scandal, Lazăr Șăineanu did not interrupt his work in linguistics. His 1891 book, Raporturile între gramatică și logică ("The Relations between Grammar and Logic"), written on the basis of his university lectures, comprised his thoughts on the origin of language and was among volumes pioneering the study of logical aspects within natural language. Datcu notes this contribution, alongside the 1892 Istoria filologiei române ("History of Romanian Philology"), for the "up to date information" provided. The latter was explained by the author as "destined to encourage the new generation to work, and come to its aid through useful advice." The two volumes were accompanied by a printed expansion of his earliest thesis on Heliade Rădulescu.

In 1895, Șăineanu completed work on one of his major contributions to folkloristics in general and the study of Romania folklore in particular: Basmele române în comparațiune cu legendele antice clasice și în legătură cu basmele popoarelor învecinate și ale tuturor popoarelor romanice ("Romanian Fairy Tales as Compared to the Legends of Classical Antiquity and Those of All Romance Peoples"). An exhaustive monograph, it comprised some 1,000 pages of main text and 100 pages of index. The volume was presented anonymously to the Romanian Academy (in accordance with its regulations), and received its Heliade Rădulescu Award. Consternation ensued once the author revealed his name, prompting Sturdza and Negruzzi to ask, unsuccessfully, for the Academy's decision to be overturned. On the occasion, Urechia (himself an Academy member) publicly stated that his adversary had purchased the award, but, Șăineanu noted, never presented proof for this assertion.

That same year, the matter of his citizenship was returned to the Senate. By then, Șăineanu's file had been further enriched with the award certificate, a guarantee of good conduct from Bucharest City Hall, and several favorable reports from Hasdeu (an exception to the latter's own antisemitic discourse). Hasdeu also arranged him interviews with Romanian Orthodox Metropolitan Ghenadie (who was also president of the commission on naturalization), while Alexandru Odobescu brought the case to the attention of Gheorghe Grigore Cantacuzino, the Conservative President of the Senate. There followed a major Senate debate, during which Urechia stood out for his repeated criticism of his former competitor, likening him to a Trojan Horse and demanding from fellow parliamentarians not to let "a foreigner" slide into "the Romanian citadel" (statements to which many responded with applause). Listing his various claims alongside his and Hasdeu's replies, the Jewish scholar himself recounted that Urechia eventually came to state, at the Senate tribune, that "Mr. Șăineanu did not publish anything against the country, but neither did he write in favor of the national question".

The early vote gave 33 to 26 against Șăineanu's naturalization, short of the supermajority required, but a second take resulted in 61 against to 12 in favor. The antisemitic segment of the board celebrated this victory with loud cheers, as witnessed by Odobescu, who recorded feeling himself confronted with the image of "cannibals who rejoiced like beasts over having slashed and devoured a civilized man". Another voice from academia to speak unfavorably of the opposition met by Șăineanu was Alexandru Philippide, who wrote: "I am not philosemitic, but if there ever was a kike deserving of naturalization, that would be Șăineanu." Shortly after this incident, the new National Liberal Minister Spiru Haret reshuffled the teaching posts, and Șăineanu, who was holding a new teacher's position at Bucharest's Școala Normală Superioară, found himself unemployed, and opted to seek employment outside Romania, in Paris and Berlin.

=== Late 1890s works and ramifications of the scandal ===
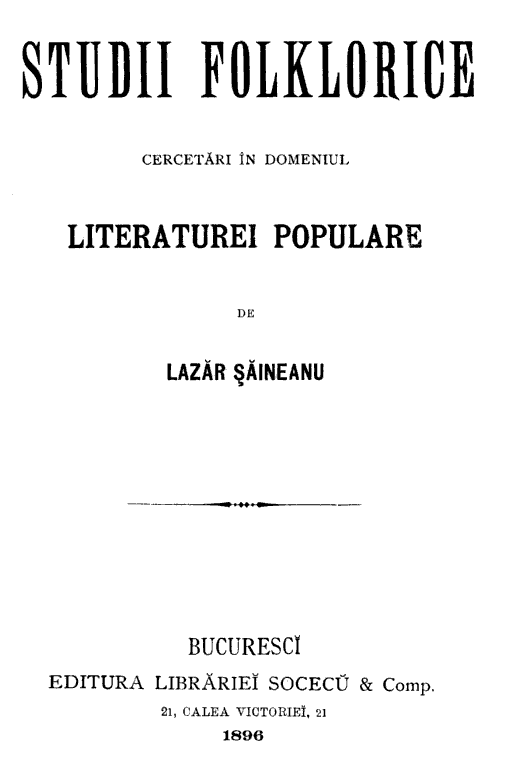
First page of Studii folclorice, cercetări în domeniul literaturii populare, 1896

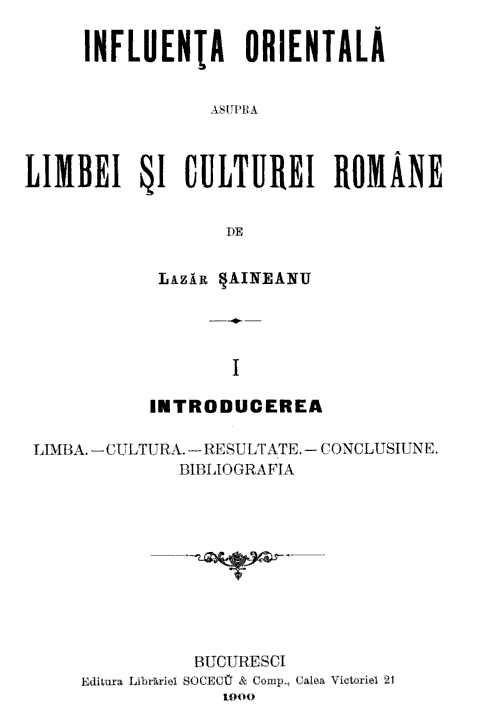
First page of Influența orientală asupra limbii și culturii române, volume I, 1900

Without ceasing to publish works for the Junimea periodical Convorbiri Literare, Șăineanu continued to frequent its adversary Hasdeu, and contributed some of his other essays to Hasdeu's magazine Revista Nouă. Basmele române was followed in 1896 by Studii folclorice ("Studies in Folklore"), a collection of short writings on comparative mythology. That same year, he completed his fundamental work in lexicography, Dicționarul universal al limbii române, which codified the Romanian lexis from archaisms and dialectical varieties to neologisms and modern jargon, comprising around 30,000 entries and 80,000 definitions. The first extensive project of its kind in the history of the local philological school, it was to prove his most popular contribution from its first edition, circumstances themselves described by writer Ion Luca Caragiale as a phenomenon in Romanian culture. Caragiale, who deemed Lazăr Șăineanu "a genuine talent in popularization", opined on the book's originality: "[Șăineanu] sought to embrace the entire manifestations in the life of a modern people [...]. Therefore, this universal dictionary provides a reduced, but precise image of our present-day culture, as it is reflected in the language." In contrast to this positive appraisal, nationalists such as Urechia's son Alceu publicly mocked the book and claimed that it lacked merit.

In parallel, the volume consecrated Șăineanu's collaboration with the Craiova-based printing house of Jewish entrepreneur Iosif Samitca (Institutul Samitca), where the scholar also published Mitologia clasică ("Classical Mythology"), the 1895 Romanian literature anthology Autori români moderni. Bucăți alese în versuri și proză din principalii scriitori ai sec. al XIX-lea ("Modern Romanian Authors. Verse and Prose Samples Collected from the Main Writers of the 19th Century"), and an 1897 biographical essay on English author William Shakespeare. The business connection turned into family relations, after Șăineanu married the daughter of Ralian Samitca, Iosif's son, associate and eventual successor. They had a daughter, Elisabeth.

Șăineanu followed up with a comprehensive study regarding Levantine presences in the vocabulary and society alike, published by Editura Socec in 1900 (as Influența orientală asupra limbii și culturii române, "The Oriental Influence on Romanian Language and Culture") and being made into a French-language edition in 1901. It received attention from the Académie des Inscriptions et Belles-Lettres, and consequently a nomination for the Institut de France's Volney Prize. However, in what has been seen as proof of the author's isolation in Romania, it was ignored by the Romanian Academy, which presented its prize for that year to a volume on the history of horses. The book was also a cause for conflict between Șăineanu and Nicolae Iorga, an established historian and nationalist politician. The heated debate, carried out in Constantin Rădulescu-Motru's periodical Noua Revistă Română, was sparked by Iorga's review, which claimed to provide some necessary amends. Șăineanu found the objections outlined by Iorga frivolous, and the overall text, in which his opponent had cited himself some 15 times, egocentric.

This reaction was met with a virulent reply by Iorga, whose renewed accusations borrowed from antisemitic discourse: "[Șăineanu wrote] about many things that he does not comprehend. He was crafting with his clumsy hands manuals, grammars, anthologies, dictionaries for speculative profit. I however had an explanation for such defects. We all know that Mr. Șăineanu is not a Romanian, and we know that which he is. His people has many traits that are very elevated and noble, but also many defects that are low and ungainly. These, I had been telling myself, are in his blood; he could never get rid of them. I wish to talk about the passion for high praise and multiple earnings, without much investment". In 1907, Iorga and his Neamul Românesc journal also retorted against Caragiale's praise for Șăineanu, calling Caragiale one who "deals with the Jews", and prompting Caragiale to satirize Iorga's own scholarly ambitions.

=== 1899 parliamentary vote and self-exile ===
In order to facilitate the naturalization procedures, Lazăr Șăineanu eventually renounced Judaism and accepted baptism in the Romanian Orthodox Church. His godfather was Take Ionescu, at the time a rising figure within the Conservative Party ranks. Ionescu himself served as Minister of Education, appreciating the scholar's insight and enjoying his company before taking his distance from him for reasons unknown. Șăineanu's case was again presented for Senate approval in December 1899, this time with a favorable review from the special parliamentary commission, and the motion for his naturalization was carried with 37 to 2 votes (or, according to Șăineanu, a 39-vote unanimity). Although the result was positive, the scientist was informed that a new procedure had just been passed with support from across the floor, specifying that naturalization could only be enforced by vote in a common session of the two chambers. The dossier was therefore submitted to another vote, on the last session of 1899, which again enlisted attacks from the antisemitic groups, before being canceled due to lack of quorum.

Reflecting on the early result, which had left him "submerged into complete happiness", and on the new vote, which he believed was a mere technicality introduced on purpose by Justice Minister Constantin Dissescu, he recalled: "for 24 hours I was politically [Șăineanu's italics] within the Romanian nationhood!" He recalled having been received by King Carol, who reportedly agreed with his belief that the action was abusive. By then, Șăineanu also lost the support of Hasdeu, who, like Take Ionescu, gave his approval to a restructuring of the university, which stripped the Jewish scholar of his honorary position. He sought instead backing from Petre P. Carp, the Conservative doyen, who reportedly answered his request with the ambiguous Latin adage Gutta cavat lapidem ("The water drop will drill through stone"). On the other side of the divide, the attacks on Șăineanu had come to be led by the antisemitic paper Apărarea Națională, whose articles, the scholar argued, "reached the summit of stupidity and ridiculousness".

On December 14, 1900, the issue of Lazăr Șăineanu's naturalization was also revisited by the lower chamber, and the proposal defeated with 44 votes to 31 (from an insufficient quorum of 75), followed by a definitive vote on December 15, at which 48 out of 95 deputies voted against. This outcome was celebrated by Apărarea Națională, which published editorial comments such as "All Romanian hearts have jumped up with immense glee" and "Our ancestors have shuddered with joy in their graves". Among those who expressed condemnation of the decision were La Roumanie journal and aristocrat Alexandru Bibescu. In 1901, frustrated by the political reaction and feeling uncomfortable in Romania, the scholar and his family resettled in Paris, where he primarily used a Francization of his Romanian name, signing as Lazare Sainéan.

=== French career and final years ===
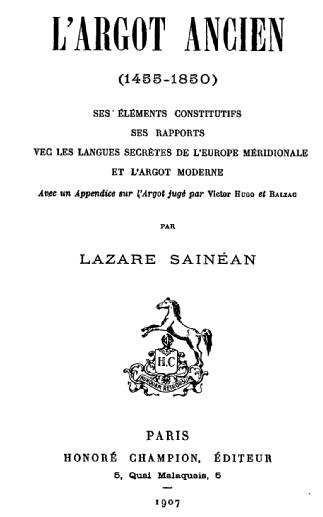
Title page of L'Argot ancien in its 1907 edition

His main interest for the following period were the theories of evolutionary linguistics, with focus on the Neogrammarian approach, ethnolinguistics and psycholinguistics. He also added to his interests the groundbreaking investigation of French argot, and published a short memoir (Une carrière philologique en Roumanie, "A Philologist's Career in Romania"). Șăineanu's studies also focused on a comparative research of building rituals as found in Balkan literature, and notably the Romanian Meșterul Manole myth (the book saw print in French, as the 1902 Les rites de la construction d'après la poésie populaire de l'Europe Orientale). By then, he was in correspondence with fellow linguist Alfred Landau, with whom he discussed the history of Yiddish.

Șăineanu's parallel investigations into the history of French included his 1905-1907 La Création métaphorique en français et en roman: images tirées du monde des animaux domestiques ("The Metaphoric Creation in French and Romance Languages: Images from the World of Domestic Animals"), which was structured into several tomes, respectively dedicated to the principal household companions. He also began work on major syntheses on French vocabulary, L'Argot ancien ("Ancient Argot") and its companion Les Sources de l'argot ancien ("The Sources of Ancient Argot", 1907). The former earned him the Volney Prize for 1908. Writing in 1999, historian Joan Leopold argued that this was a significant achievement, since the Volney Commission "seemed to fear direct competition by foreigners"—other exceptions to this rule being Liu Bannong, Wilhelm Schmidt and Marie-Louise Sjoestedt. According to Leopold, Șăineanu was among the Volney prizewinners, "particularly foreigners", who "were never elected to an affiliation with the French Académies." However, she also notes that "there were no titles honored [during 1900-1909] which are now remembered as significant in the history of linguistics". She places the fact that Șăineanu "did not achieve major university positions in France" in connection with a tendency of awarding the prize to scholars who mainly did field work (Schmidt, Adolphe de Calassanti-Motylinski, George Abraham Grierson, Leo Reinisch and others). Literary critic Laszlo Alexandru passed a similar judgment: "Lazăr Șăineanu's disappearance from the Romanian cultural space was received with an almost unanimous silence; but the emergence of Lazare Sainéan in Parisian scientific research would not itself result, for the rest of his days, in the much coveted and entirely deserved university chair."

Between 1912 and 1922, Șăineanu worked with the Société des Études rabelaisiennes on publishing the annotated edition of Rabelais' complete works. His career was not interrupted by World War I, and, in 1915, he published a report on the special language of French soldiers entrenched on the Western Front (L'Argot des tranchés, "Trench Argot"). His 1920 volume on the evolution of argot in Parisian French (Le Langage parisien au XIXe siècle, "Parisian Language in the 19th Century"), was again nominated for a Volney Prize.

In 1922, Șăineanu published Manuel de phonétique latin ("Manual of Latin Phonetics"), the last of his contributions to be shortlisted for a Volney. By then, he had also become interested in researching the work of French Renaissance author François Rabelais, primarily focusing on his use of Middle French—an account published between 1920 and 1923 as La Langue de Rabelais ("Rabelais' Language"). Between 1925 and 1930, he published the volumes of a large-scale project, Les Sources indigènes de l'étymologie française ("The Indigenous Sources of French Etymology"), which was reputedly the result of three decades in specialized research. In 1930, Șăineanu followed up with another book on Rabelais, mainly dedicated to his critical reception and cultural legacy (L'Influence et la réputation de Rabelais, "Rabelais' Influence and Reputation"). He died four years later at a hospital in Paris, after complications from surgery.

== Work ==
=== Background and tenets ===
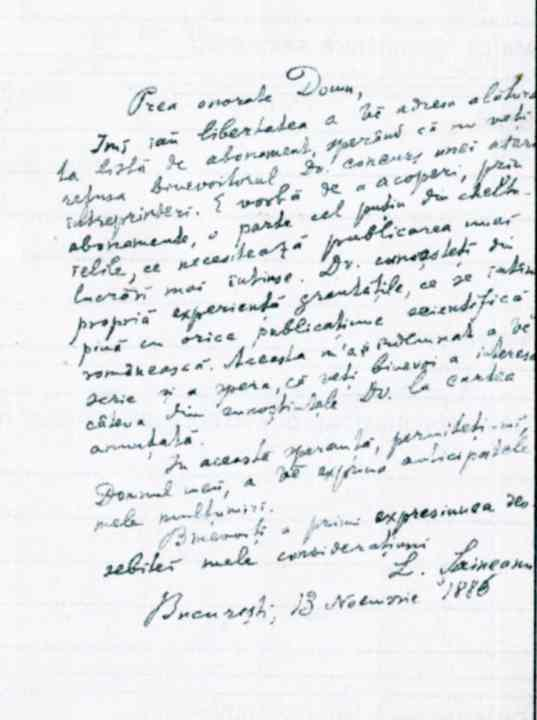
Șăineanu's letter to fellow folklorist Simion Florea Marian (November 1886)

The diverse cultural background on which Lazăr Șăineanu relied and his early familiarity with several traditions are occasionally credited as sources for his scholarly achievements. Joan Leopold noted that the Romanian-born scholar was among the fourteen or fifteen Jews of various nationalities whose work was taken into consideration by the Volney Committee during the 19th century, pointing to the legacy of "Talmudic and [Jewish] philological traditions" within modern science. His Jewish identity, literary historian George Călinescu noted in 1933, went in tandem with an exceptional familiarity with Romanian language and culture; like other of his fellow Jewish Romanian intellectuals (among whom Călinescu cited philologists Gaster and Barbu Lăzăreanu, Marxist theorist Constantin Dobrogeanu-Gherea and dramatist Ronetti Roman), Șăineanu possessed "an amazingly rich Romanian lexis".

During his time in Romania, the scientist was involved in cultural debates surrounding the Romanian ethos. As a disciple of Moses Gaster and contributor to Anuar pentru Israeliți, Șăineanu implicitly stood for a Haskalah ideology, supporting Jewish integration into the cultural mainstream, and favored the scientific approach to Jewish history akin to the Wissenschaft des Judentums methods. Laszlo Alexandru refers to his "fundamental program" as being "the assimilationist thesis", and explains that, for this reason, the scholar changed Schein to Șăineanu. The same commentator notes that Șăineanu disregarded Bogdan Petriceicu Hasdeu's publicized antisemitism when he became a "fervent disciple" of Hasdeu in scholarly matters. In reference to his own patriotic sentiment, Șăineanu once defined the country as "twice sacred to my eyes—the land where I was born and where my parents sleep their eternal slumber." After his departure to France, he further stated that he bore "not even the shadow of a grudge" on the Romanian people as a whole. According to literary historian Eugen Lovinescu, the scholar's subsequent correspondence stands as "proof of sincere adherence, prolonged over decades and perils, to his country of origin". However, according to one account, when Șăineanu happened to meet Nicolae Iorga in Paris some decades after their polemic, he made a point of addressing him in French, which was interpreted as a statement of disgust with the Romanian cultural environment.

Șăineanu also made himself known for the points of view which he expressed in relation to the debates over the Latin alphabet and orthography, within the context of linguistic evolution. Overall, Șăineanu argued that early Romanian history as taught in his lifetime was better covered by philologists, since, before the time of Michael the Brave, it had "more of an ethnographic and philological character". He reacted against the politicization of research and accusations that his own works did not support popular views of "the national question". At a time when the Cyrillic version had been discarded but the new spelling was still largely unregulated, he joined the outspoken critics of attempts to modify the shape of words so as to suggest their Latin origins. The "Latinist" approach, experimented in the lexicographic work of I. C. Massim and August Treboniu Laurian and originating with the Transylvanian School, was favored for a while by the Romanian Academy, but had become widely ridiculed by the 1880s. According to the scholar's own words, "Latinomaniac tendencies" were nevertheless present with National Liberals such as Sturdza, and formed a background theme in the party's conflict with Moses Gaster. While approaching the Junimea society's tenets on this matter, Șăineanu also shared Bogdan Petriceicu Hasdeu's criticism of Junimist Germanophilia. In 1897, the two scholars published Eine Trilogie (German for "A Trilogy"), criticizing a perceived Conservative and Junimist monopoly on the Romanian literary scene in general, and, in particular, the officially condoned historical overview by Wilhelm Rudow, Gheorghe Bogdan-Duică and Iacob Negruzzi, which seemed to omit mention of any politically inconvenient literary contribution.

=== Work in Romanian folklore ===
Much of Lazăr Șăineanu earliest contributions connected his linguistic research with his interest in Romanian folklore. Aiming to be "a genuine corpus of Romanian oral literature", Basmele române aimed at introducing the major themes in local spoken tradition, listing and transcribing some 500 stories. Lazăr Șăineanu took additional care in preserving the integrity of the oral level of Romanian literature in printed versions, and urged other folklorists interviewing storytellers to keep notes on the latter's special talents. Such preoccupations in preserving context were also found in his lexicographic work; according to Caragiale, Dicționarul universal was groundbreaking because its author took care "to support with authentic testimonies the words and the nuances of meanings."

A special section of Șăineanu's research in the same area was dedicated to comparative mythology. His contributions have led folklorist Linda Dégh to deem him "one of the pioneers in classifying folktales according to their types". This method was employed in Basmele române, whose content was structured into both types and "cycles". In Basmele române, arguing in favor of applying the principles introduced by Hasdeu, Șăineanu analyzed Romanian folktales in their native and national content. Nevertheless, he followed the conclusions of other folklorists on the universality of folklore, suggesting that the world's entire folkloric literature was structured into some tens of groups. With Studii folclorice, the researcher tested an anthropological investigation into the characteristics and supposed origins of each myth, in particular Meșterul Manole, Baba Dochia and the iele creatures. In Les rites de la construction, Șăineanu focused on a set of ballads with a similar construction- and immurement-related subject, present throughout East Central or Eastern Europe, likening the Romanian Meșterul Manole legend to its counterparts in Serbian (Zidanje Skadra), Hungarian (Kőműves Kelemen) and other regional folkloric traditions. According to critics John Neubauer and Marcel Cornis-Pope, he was "the first author to attempt a synthetic treatment of the immurement motif in Eastern Europe". The two also note that Șăineanu, who believed that the motif reached its potential significance only in Eastern Europe, stayed clear of the controversy surrounding the geographic and ethnic sources of the ballad (while specifying his belief that the Hungarian version followed a Romanian source), and discussed Zidanje Skadra and Meșterul Manole as the most crafted variants of the myth.

One portion of Șăineanu's studies in Romanian folklore bordered on his investigation of Jewish history. The scholar noticed recurring characteristic among antagonists in Romanian fairy tales, particularly the uriași—occasionally known as jidovi, "Jews", or tătari, "Tatars". He attributed such traits to a possible conflictual encounter, taking place at some point in the early medieval period, between Romanians (or Vlachs) and the Khazars, a Turkic tribe that had adopted Judaism. His interpretation, as paraphrased by the scholar himself, concluded: "Was there in the past a people about which one could claim with certainty that it was both Tatar and Jewish at the same time? My answer to this question is that such a people existed, and it is known in history under the name of Khazars [...]. After spreading its domination over Eastern Europe, these Jewish-Tatars suddenly disappeared from the stage of history. What became of them? A part of these Khazars will have looked early on for a shelter in Transylvania, from where they crossed to the Danubian countries, especially in Muntenia, particularly in Muscel and Romanați districts where the traditional memories regarding them seem to be concentrated. [...] The settlements and their dwellings left important traces that took on colossal proportions in people's imagination. People of a supernatural size seemed to have lived [...] in an ancient time, which the old can hardly remember, and our peasants call those giant people Jews or Tatars." The scholar referred to various constants in folkloric accounts: peasants' testimonies which attributed large stone ruins to the Jews (whom they occasionally referred to as giants or supernaturally powerful people) and the "red" antagonists in fairy tales such as Ion Creangă's Harap Alb (the "Red Emperor", the "Red Man" and people with red-colored facial markings, all placed by Șăineanu in connection to the "Red Jews" myth). Șăineanu's political adversaries, including V. A. Urechia, saw in this theory evidence of a Jewish historiographical attempt at overriding the Romanian presence in the area—an interpretation since defined as "in bad faith" and "slanderous" by Laszlo Alexandru.

=== Yiddish and Romanian linguistics ===
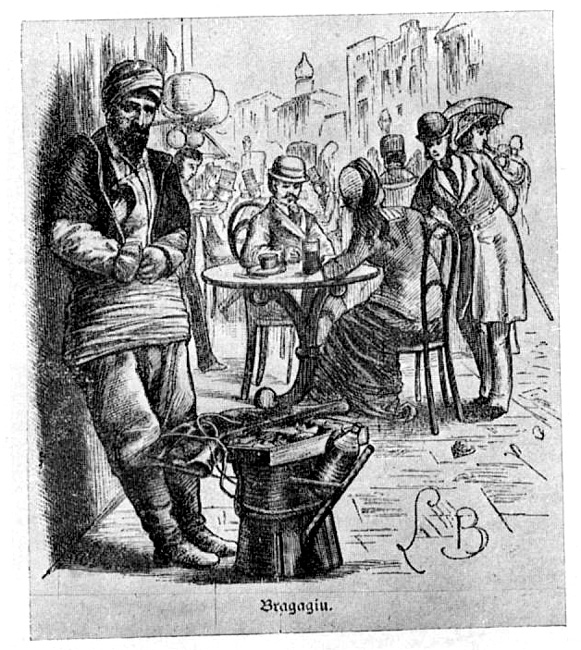
A Turkish-Romanian bragagiu, in an 1880s rendition

The scholar earned much recognition for his parallel work in Yiddish linguistics. According to American researcher Jerold C. Frakes, he is one of the "major scholars of the late nineteenth century" to have studied the Yiddish language, his contribution ranking him alongside Maks Erik, Solomon Birnbaum, Chone Shmeruk, Max and Uriel Weinreich. According to Hebraist Robert D. King, such contributions rank Șăineanu, Alfred Landau and Matisyohu Mieses "among the first scholars to take Yiddish seriously, to force others [King's italics] to take it seriously, to move conceptually beyond the stupid position that Yiddish was 'bad German' or 'jargon', a second-rate excuse of a language." His inquiry into medieval structures connecting Yiddish and German is seen by Germanists Dagmar C. G. Lorenz and Neil G. Jacobs as a substantial discovery, Șăineanu being the first to indicate "that the German component of Yiddish traces back to Middle High German sources" (meaning that "Yiddish was no longer to be evaluated in terms of New High German"). The scholar was also reportedly the discoverer of a direct link between Yiddish and Aramaic; this allowed the conclusion that the Jewish German dialect originated among Aramaic-speaking and pre-Ashkenazi Jews, who originally settled further east than the Askhenazi home in the Rhineland.

In his studies of Turkish and Turkic borrowings into the Romanian lexis, Lazăr Șăineanu looked back on historical events leading back to the Age of Migrations, such as in highlighting the possible Pecheneg origin of relatively common Romanian words such as buzdugan ("mace"), duium ("multitude"), dușman ("enemy"), caia ("horseshoe nail"), colibă ("hut") and fotă ("skirt"). However, one of his primary focuses was on Ottoman Turkish as a mediator between Romanian and other languages: the Romanian word giuvaier ("jewel"), borrowed from the Turkish cevahir, but originating with a Persian source; trampă ("barter"), taken from the Turkish trampa, but sourced to the Italian tramutare ("to transform"); talaz ("high wave"), identical to the Turkish intermediary, and through it borrowed from the Greek Θάλασσα (thalassa, "sea"). Additionally, the scholar documented the distant impression of Levantine territories, as first introduced through Ottoman culture—as illustrated by the original references to Egypt as Misir, from the Arabic مصر (Miṣr), as opposed to the more modern Egipt. He also discussed the professional suffixes -giu and -angiu, both of Turkish origin and present in words borrowed during the early modern and Phanariote eras. Main examples include barcagiu ("boater" or "ferryman"), bragagiu ("boza maker"), geamgiu ("window fitter"), toptangiu ("wholesale vendor") etc., but the suffix is also applied ironically in various other contexts—for example, mahalagiu ("inhabitant of the mahala", "suburbanite" or "uncouth person") and duelgiu ("dueler"). Șăineanu's texts followed the evolutions of similar words ending in -liu (such as hazliu, "funny", from haz, "laughter"), of popular figures of speech directly translated from their Turkish original (a bea tutun, "to drink tobacco", or the question în ce ape te scalzi?, "what waters do you bathe in?", figurative for "how are you feeling?"), and of strong obscenities reflecting Oriental sources. In general, Șăineanu concluded, such appropriation from an area mediated by Islam and Islamic culture was not present in areas directed related to Christian practice and intellectual life.

Especially in his Influența orientală asupra limbii și culturii române, Șăineanu evidenced the spread of Turkish borrowings throughout the Balkans, and concluded that they had a more significant presence in Aromanian than in Romanian. His contemporary, philologist Vasile Bogrea, referred to the volume as a "Bible of Oriental elements in Romanian", while the author himself deemed it a "supreme testimony of my love for the Romanian language and people". According to writer and critic Alexandru Mușina, Șăineanu was foremost among the linguists who challenged a linear take on the origin of the Romanians, evidencing, like Alexandru Philippide and Alexandru Cihac, the "heterogeneous, plurilingual and multicultural character of our Romanity", with the underlying "processes of acculturation". In particular, Mușina notes, it was Șăineanu's study of Turkish words and expressions settled in the everyday language that uncovered "a forma mentis, common Oriental, Turco-Romanian mentality."

=== Studies of French language and civilization ===
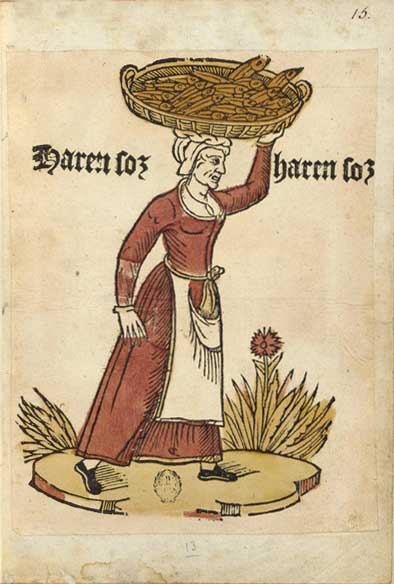
A herring monger and her cri de Paris, as depicted in a hand-colored engraving (ca. 1500)

With La Création métaphorique, the researcher inventoried the representations of animals in the late medieval imaginary: lions and cocks as representations of courage, hunting dogs as icons of arrogance, pigs as symbols of gluttony etc. The books notably showed the traditional semantic parallelisms between cats, monkeys and apes, as codified in several Romance languages, and investigated the animals' respective roles within popular demonology and metaphors of drunkenness. With Les Sources indigènes de l'étymologie française, Șăineanu offered clues on the obscure origin of various French words. Șăineanu thus sourced the French and English harlequin beyond the Italian-language arlechino in Commedia dell'arte, and back to a medieval legend in Middle French.

A number of Șăineanu's texts focused on the language patterns covered by "argot" and the original meaning of "jargon", in relation to French and Parisian social history, discussing the language of the gueux (marginalized and destitute migrants), the obscene nature of some medieval performances, the linguistic codes used by brigands during the Hundred Years' War, and the impact of argot in the work of poet François Villon or other French Renaissance writers. Le Langage parisien au XIXe siècle discussed in part the emergence of what Șăineanu himself defined as le bas langage parisien ("the lowly Parisian language"), a mix of argots emerging from 19th century urbanization. His studies in the area were part of a phenomenon in French linguistics: at roughly the same time as Șăineanu, argot studies were becoming the main subject of works by researchers such as Arnold van Gennep and Raoul De La Grasserie. A disagreement occurred between Șăineanu and Gennep over the origins and age of argot: Gennep criticized his colleague's claim that "no European argot has sources beyond the 15th century", arguing that such statements were not verifiable, and that they presumed "some kind of spontaneous generation". Also according to Gennep, Șăineanu was among those Eurocentric scholars who offered a "teratological" view of argot as an "aberrant creation".

As part of his efforts to advance the study of Middle French, Șăineanu dedicated himself to an applied study of François Rabelais and his role in French literature. Called "remarkable and abundantly documented" by Russian semiotician Mikhail Bakhtin, La Langue de Rabelais outlines the use, context and origin of some 3,770 individual words in Rabelaisian vocabulary. It was especially noted for its details on various contributions to Rabelais' means of expression, including staples of French folklore such as the so-called Cris de Paris (chants traditionally produced by Parisian street vendors). Some of his other contributions to the study of Rabelais' work, as described by Bakhtin, include the inventory of culinary metaphors found throughout Gargantua and Pantagruel, and evidence that Rabelais had an unmitigated familiarity with the maritime trade. La Langue de Rabelais also offered clues into 16th-century views of homosexuality, discussing the origin of archaisms such as bardachiser ("to sodomize") or the link between Rabelais' maritime terminology and medieval reactions to homoeroticism.

In his work on the subject, Șăineanu also stood out as one of those rejecting the notion that Rabelais' writings have a special anticlerical meaning, arguing instead that his mockery of clerical society was merely a rendition of common and folkloric attitudes—a conclusion quoted in agreement by Annales School historian Lucien Febvre in his own The Problem of Unbelief in the Sixteenth Century. Also cited by Febvre are Șăineanu's views on Islamic and "Saracen" echos in Gargantua and Pantagruel (such as the depiction of Fierabras), as well as on Rabelais' references to miraculous cures as being borrowed from earlier romance fiction. In a parallel series of articles, the Romanian scholar also discussed the link between Ancient Roman thinker Pliny the Elder and the Renaissance writer, commenting on the similarity between Rabelais' description of medical practices and statements found in Natural History.

== Legacy ==
Despite the antisemitic campaigns and the voluntary expatriation, Șăineanu's reputation with the Romanian public was largely unharmed, and his works went through new Romanian-language editions: Dicționarul universal alone was reissued a total of nine times before 2009, and was allegedly a primary target for plagiarism from the moment of its publication. In tandem, Șăineanu's request that his peers publish details on the individual storytellers providing the folkloric accounts was respected by some, including Alexandru Vasiliu, collector of Povești și legende ("Stories and Legends", 1928). Two years after Șăineanu's death, his brother Constantin collected and edited his correspondence, publishing it in Bucharest.

Much interest in Șăineanu's work was sparked during the interwar period, shortly before and after the scholar's death, when new generations of critics came to reclaim his work as an important contribution to the field of science. Outside of Romania and France, Șăineanu's contribution of Rabelais left an observable trace in Finnegans Wake, a 1939 modernist novel by Irish novelist James Joyce: while Joyce's text holds transparent allusions to Rabelais' writings, the writer himself claimed to have never read the originals, and to have instead relied solely on a scientific study (in turn identified by research Claude Jacquet as La Langue de Rabelais).

Interwar Romanian intellectuals, primarily George Călinescu and Eugen Lovinescu, played a part in reevaluating and bringing to attention Șăineanu's contribution within its Romanian and international context. Șăineanu's correspondence was itself a topic of controversy between the two rival critics: after Lovinescu showed himself impressed by a letter in which Șăineanu stated E. Lovinescu m'impose ("E. Lovinescu impresses me"), Călinescu noted that his competitor had a tendency to quote "all things flattering him, no matter how cheap." During the same decade, the maverick writer Panait Istrati, himself a voluntary exile to France, explained that Dicționarul universal was "the holy book" of his Romanian adolescence. However, Lucian Nastasă notes, the antisemitic background beyond Șăineanu's rejection (as well as the similar affair involving Solomon Schechter) continued to make itself felt throughout those years, with other Jewish scholars (Leon Feraru or Alexandru Graur) being actively prevented from seeking employment in their field. Braving the violently antisemitic and authoritarian regime of Conducător Ion Antonescu, in place during most of World War II, Călinescu commented favorably on the contributions of Jewish figures to Romanian cultural life in his main synthesis, the 1941 History of Romanian Literature. It included a reference to Jewish linguists Șăineanu, Gaster, Ion Aurel Candrea, as scholars whose merits would be "regrettable to deny".

In contrast, the Romanian far right and fascist groups continued to regard Șăineanu's marginalization as justified. The 1930s witnessed a controversy which, according to Laszlo Alexandru, recalled the confrontation between Hasdeu and Lazăr Șăineanu: Hasdeu's place was held by academic Nae Ionescu, who moved toward fascism and antisemitism, while Șăineanu's position was assumed by Ionescu's Jewish disciple, writer Mihail Sebastian. Writing for Azi during the Sebastian scandal of 1934, journalist N. Roșu, an affiliate of the fascist Iron Guard, claimed that "Romanian culture will go on living" irrespective of Jewish absences such as Șăineanu and Gaster, that one's creativity depended on one's "Romanianness", and that philology studies reflected one's "sensitivity". In 1936, a Guardist named Vasile Gârcineanu called Dicționarul universal "a characteristically Jewish work, superficially and poorly crafted". While cultivating an ambiguous relationship with fascism, which eventually brought him into the ranks of the Iron Guard, philosopher Mircea Eliade, one of Ionescu's other known disciples, publicly deplored Șăineanu's social relegation and Gaster's expulsion.

The communist period witnessed a long hiatus in respect to the critical assessment of Șăineanu's work: in 1962, linguist Dumitru Macrea referred to his predecessor as an "all but forgotten" figure, and none of Șăineanu's volumes were printed between the 1947 edition of his dictionary and the 1978 version of Basmele române. This reticence was however contrasted by the appreciation of various academics: Iorgu Iordan commented on his "extraordinary erudition", recommended his disciples to study his work, and referred to his repudiation by the Romanian state as "a real stain on our public life of the late [19th] century". During that time, Iordan and his colleagues Perpessicius and Alexandru Rosetti published renewed commentary on Șăineanu's work, being later joined by philosopher Constantin Noica, folklorist Ovidiu Bârlea and various other intellectuals.

A new edition of Dicționarul universal saw print after the 1989 Revolution and the end of communism. According to writer and researcher Rodica Marian, this reissue "without interventions" constitutes proof of a return to the "past parameters" of lexicography, at the end of a deterioration of standards. It was followed by several other initiatives, which notably resulted in reprints of Studii folclorice and Încercare asupra semasiologiei române. Writing in 2003, Alexandru Mușina referred to Șăineanu as a "great", "mistreated" and "unrecognized" linguist, defining Influența orientală asupra limbii și culturii române as "his valuable work, as yet unchallenged and still relevant". In 2008, the case surrounding Șăineanu's naturalization bid was the subject of a biographical study, written by historian George Voicu and published by the Elie Wiesel National Institute for Studying the Holocaust in Romania. Șăineanu's works have also been the subject of reprints in France, and have continued to be recommended secondary sources by academic institutions in the United States more than a century after they were first published. His posthumously published writings include a 1991 edition of Une carrière philologique en Roumanie.
