= V. A. Urechia =

Romanian politician and academic (1834–1901)

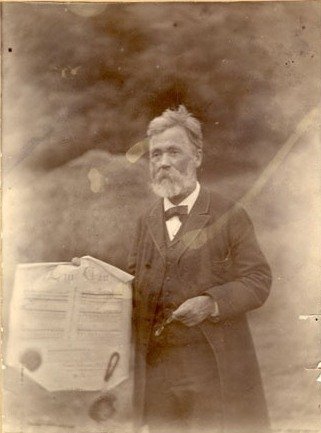
- Urechia in Sinaia, 1890
- Born: Vasile Alexandrescu Popovici; 15 February 1834; Piatra Neamț, Moldavia
- Died: 21 November 1901 (aged 67); Bucharest, Kingdom of Romania
- Occupations: Historian; critic; journalist; novelist; short story writer; dramatist; schoolteacher; academic; politician; civil servant
- Writing career
- Pen name: Vasile Alexandrescu; Popovici-Ureche
- Period: c. 1850–1900
- Genres: Historical fiction; novella; memoir; comedy
- Movements: Romanticism; Literatorul

Signature
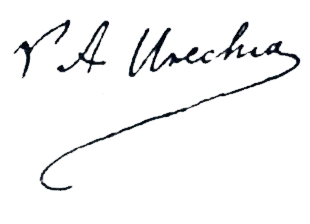

V. A. Urechia (most common version of Vasile Alexandrescu Urechia, Romanian pronunciation: [vaˈsile aleksanˈdresku uˈreke̯a]; born Vasile Alexandrescu and also known as Urechiă, Urechea, Ureche, Popovici-Ureche or Vasile Urechea-Alexandrescu; 15 February 1834 – 21 November 1901) was a Moldavian, later Romanian historian, Romantic author of historical fiction and plays, academic and politician. The author of Romanian history syntheses, a noted bibliographer, heraldist, ethnographer and folklorist, he founded and managed a private school, later holding teaching positions at the University of Iași and University of Bucharest. Urechia was also one of the founding members of the Romanian Academy and, as frequent traveler to Spain and fluent speaker of Spanish, a corresponding member of the Royal Spanish Academy. He was the father of satirist Alceu Urechia.

As an ideologue, Urechia developed "Romanianism", which offered a template for cultural and political cooperation among Romanians from several historical regions, and formed part of a Pan-Latinist campaign. An activist in favor of the Moldavia's union to Wallachia and a representative of the liberal wing, he was briefly Moldavian Minister of Religious Affairs, and later a prominent member of the National Liberal Party. For more than three decades, Urechia represented Covurlui County in the Romanian Kingdom's Chamber of Deputies and Senate. He was Education Minister under two successive National Liberal administrations, and, during the 1890s, he founded the Cultural League for the Unity of All Romanians, which focused on encouraging the aspirations of Romanians living in Austria-Hungary.

Urechia was involved in a decade-long controversy with Junimea, a conservative literary society which advocated professionalization. Among those involved on the Junimist side were literary critic Titu Maiorescu and poet Mihai Eminescu. Like other contributors to the liberal magazine Revista Contimporană, Urechia was a notorious target of Maiorescu's campaign against "inebriation with words", and ultimately sided with the anti-Junimist author Alexandru Macedonski, becoming a contributor to Literatorul magazine. The polemics touched on his private life, after claims surfaced that he was secretly leading a polygynous lifestyle.

== Name ==
V. A. Urechia was known to his contemporaries by several name variants: his rival Eminescu once described him as having "seven names". Urechia, which the writer added in adult life, is a variant of urechea (Romanian for "the ear"), often transcribed as ureche ("ear"). An occasional rendition of the name, reflecting antiquated versions of the Romanian alphabet, is Urechiă.

The writer was initially known as Vasile Alexandrescu, the latter being his patronymic, of which his family name, Popovici, was an alternative. Spanish sources occasionally rendered Urechia's first name as Basilio, and his full name was at times Francized as Basil Alexandresco.

== Biography ==
=== Early life ===
Born in Piatra Neamț, Urechia was the son of Alexandru Popovici, a member of the boyar class in Moldavia and a titular culcer; his mother, Eufrosina (or Euphrosina) née Manoliu. Both had been widowed or divorced from previous marriages, and Vasile had stepsiblings from each parent. After the culcer's death, he and three other of Eufrosina's youngest children, all of them below legal age, moved in with their mother, who remarried serdar Fotino. In spring 1848, he was in Iași, where he witnessed the failed rebellion provoked by the Romantic nationalist and liberal current with which he would later affiliate. He debuted in journalism upon the end of the 1840s, when he wrote pieces condemning Transylvanian-born educators for promoting a version of Romanian which overemphasized the language's connection with Latin.

During most of the 1850s, the young Vasile Alexandrescu was in France, spending most of his time in Paris, where he received his Baccalauréat (1856), and trained for a licence ès lettres degree. Urechia frequented exiles from both Danubian Principalities (Moldavia and Wallachia), growing close to the Wallachian politico C. A. Rosetti. Having written his debut literary works, some grouped in 1854 under the title Mozaic de novele, cugetări, piese și poezii ("A Mosaic of Novellas, Musings, Plays and Poetry"), he also completed a debut novel, Coliba Măriucăi ("Măriuca's Cabin", in 1855). The plot was loosely based on Uncle Tom's Cabin, by the American abolitionist writer Harriet Beecher Stowe, and was adapted to the realities of Romani slavery in Moldavia. He was at the time collaborating on Steaua Dunării, a unionist magazine co-edited by the Moldavian intellectuals Mihail Kogălniceanu and Vasile Alecsandri, where he published a Romanian-language translation of Canción a las ruinas de Itálica ("Song to the Ruins of Italica"), a Spanish Renaissance poem written by Rodrigo Caro, but attributed by scholars of the day to Fernando de Rioja.

A believer in Pan-Latinism, he popularized the cause of Romanians through articles published in the Romance-speaking press of France and Spain, and founded Opiniunea, a magazine for Moldo-Wallachian exiles in Paris. During 1856, as the Crimean War brought an end to Imperial Russian administration in the two countries and its Regulamentul Organic regime, the exiles saw an opportunity for action in favor of the union. During the Peace Treaty Conference of that year, Urechia was secretary of a Romanian Bureau which popularized the unionist cause among the participants, and proposed a Romanian state under a foreign ruler, whom Urechia wanted to be of "Latin" origin.

=== Late 1850s and first ministerial appointment ===
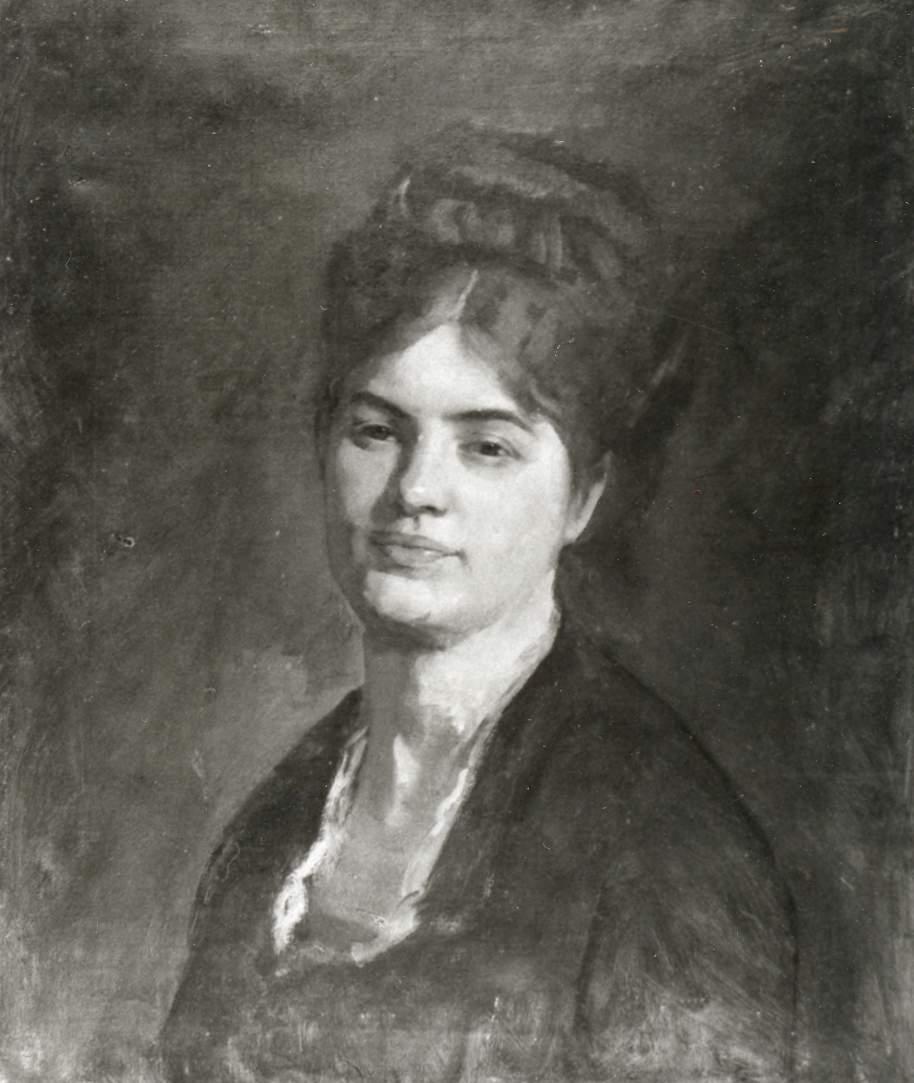
Luiza Urechia ca. 1869–1875, portrait by Nicolae Grigorescu

In August 1857, he married the upper-class Spanish woman Francisca Dominica de Plano, whose father had been the personal physician of Queen regent Isabella II. The wedding at the Romanian Orthodox Chapel in Paris. He was in Spain from 1857 to 1858 and again in 1862, researching local archives and Spanish education. Francisca introduced her husband to several figures in Spain's cultural and political life: poets Ramón de Campoamor y Campoosorio and Gaspar Núñez de Arce, the future leaders of the First Republic Emilio Castelar y Ripoll and Francisco Pi y Margall, as well as dramatist Manuel Tamayo y Baus. During the following decade, Urechia also traveled to Greece, Switzerland, Italy and the German Empire.

Upon his 1858 return to Moldavia, Urechia was appointed court inspector in Iași County and Romanian language teacher at a gymnasium level. After 1860, he held a Romanian-language and Classical Literature chair at the newly founded University of Iași. His wife Francisca died a young woman, most likely before 1860, and Urechia remarried, to the German amateur musician Luiza "Zettina" Wirth. In 1859–1860, as the political union was being effected under the rule of Alexander John Cuza as Domnitor, V. A. Urechia briefly served as Moldavia's Minister of Religious Affairs in the Kogălniceanu administration. During his term in office, he awarded scholarships to local undergraduates, sending them to complete their education in the universities of France, Spain, Portugal and the Kingdom of Sardinia. Also then, he published the literary criticism volumes Schițări de literatură română ("Sketches of Romanian Literature", 1859) and O vorbă despre literatura desfrînată ce se încearcă a se introduce în societatea română ("A Word on the Profligate Literature that Threatens to Introduce Itself into Romanian Society", 1863).

He was still involved in building connections with France while pursuing his interest in ethnography, and joined the Paris-based Société d'Ethnographie, collaborating closely with its chairman Léon de Rosny. He also became an active member of the Institut d'Ethnographie and the Heraldry Society of France. Beginning in 1861, he was publishing the Iași-based magazine Atheneul Român. A pro-liberal venue, it was noted for reacting against Urechia's former associate Alecsandri over the latter's conservative views. The Atheneul Român society was the nucleus of a country-wide cultural movement, which Urechia claimed was instrumental in establishing both the Romanian Academy (founded 1866) and the Romanian Athenaeum (founded 1888). Urechia's initiative was inspired by his admiration for the Spanish institution Ateneo de Madrid.

=== Relocation to Bucharest ===
In November 1864, Urechia moved to unified Romania's capital, Bucharest, having been granted a seat at the local university's Faculty of Letters, but continued to manage a "V. A. Urechia Institute", his private school. He was also employed as Head of Department in the Education Ministry, in which position he helped his future rival, Titu Maiorescu, who was at the time facing allegations of misconduct and pressured to resign from his teaching position. Also then, as a bibliographer and avid book collector, he was among those tasked by Cuza with drafting the common statute of public libraries throughout the country. He was one of the Romanian Academy's original members upon its 1866 foundation as the Academic Society, and subsequently participated in setting up its Library. Urechia served as vice-chairman and general secretary of the Academy for several terms, was president of its Historical Section, and supervised a number of its cultural programs. Dissolved in Iași due to lack of members, the Atheneul Român club was reestablished in the capital during 1865. That year, he published two books: Femeia română, dupre istorie și poesie ("The Romanian Woman in History and Poetry") and Balul mortului ("The Dead Man's Ball").

After Cuza's replacement with Carol I, Urechia successfully ran in the November 1866 election for a Chamber seat in Covurlui County. He was a member of Parliament for the next 34 years, moving from Chamber to the Senate, and pushing legislation to modernize the education system.

Also in 1866, Urechia published an essay of fables, which centered on the work of Dimitrie Țichindeal (or Chichindeal), an early 19th-century poet from Banat. In 1867, he completed work on his best-known literary contribution to local theater, a three-act drama or melodrama inspired by the 17th-century life of Costea Bucioc. The same year and the next, he published Despre elocința română ("On Romanian Eloquence"), Poezia în fața politicei ("Poetry vs. Politics") and Patria română ("The Romanian Motherland"). He was in Spain from spring 1867 to autumn 1868, perfecting his knowledge of Castilian and carrying out an extended research into local archives, being received as corresponding member of the Royal Spanish Academy (2 April 1868). Together with fellow intellectual and amateur archaeologist Alexandru Odobescu, Urechia represented Romania at the 1869 World Archaeological Congress in Paris. He and Luiza Wirth divorced at some point after 1868.

In parallel, Urechia published several new works of historical fiction, including, in 1872, the drama Episod de sub Alecsandru cel Bun ("An Episode from the Rule of Alexander the Good"). In 1872, he also premiered the one-act comedy Odă la Elisa ("An Ode to Elisa"), which he had written during 1869.

=== Conflict with Junimea ===
A major event in V. A. Urechia's career occurred in 1869, when Maiorescu and his like-minded friends established Junimea society in Iași. At the time, Urechia was editing the journal Adunarea Națională, which initially regarded the Junimists with sympathy, despite the fact that Maiorescu was already making his anti-liberal agenda public. By the early 1870s however, Urechia had become engaged in a major cultural polemic with the Junimists, which reflected the liberal-conservative and Romantic-Neoclassical splits within Romanian society. Although usually adverse to other liberal factions, including the group formed around historian Bogdan Petriceicu Hasdeu and Nicolae Ionescu's Fracțiunea liberă și independentă, he united with them in condemning Junimea's views and cultural guidelines. Also during that decade, he openly sided with the radicals around C. A. Rosetti, who would, in 1875, contribute to the creation of the National Liberal Party.

Urechia collaborated with Dimitrie August Laurian and Ștefan Michăilescu on the anti-Junimist, Romantic and pro-liberal tribune Revista Contimporană after 1873. Critic and historian Tudor Vianu saw Urechia as the group's spiritus rector, while literary historian George Călinescu wrote: "[the journal] had prestige and, intimately, the Junimists grew worried." In its first issue, it hosted Urechia's study on 17th century Moldavian chronicler Miron Costin and his writings, as well as historical pieces by Gheorghe Sion and Pantazi Ghica, all of which were soon after criticized by Maiorescu in his essay Beția de cuvinte ("Inebriation with Words"). In parallel, Urechia had a conflict with the Jewish writer and pedagogue Ronetti Roman, whom he had employed teacher at his Institute. In his pamphlet Domnul Kanitferstan (Mr. Kanitferstan"), Ronetti Roman reported having been shocked to discover that Urechia was an antisemite.

After the Russo-Turkish War which granted Romania its independence, Urechia represented the country to the International Congress of Anthropological and Ethnological Sciences, and presided over one of its sessions. Later in the year, he was invited to participate in the Congress on literature in London, England. In 1879, he was elected member of an Aromanian cultural league, the Macedo-Romanian Cultural Society, becoming its president the following year and editing its historiographic textbook, Albumul macedo-român ("The Macedo-Romanian Album"). He was presented with a bronze medal by the Société d'Ethnographie in 1880, and, the following year, received its medal of honor. The same body created the Urechia Prize for Ethnographic Research, first awarded in 1882, and awarded him lifetime membership of the Institut d'Ethnographie. Between 1878 and 1889, he grouped his earlier writings under the title Opere complete ("Complete Works").

=== Political preeminence and Literatorul years ===
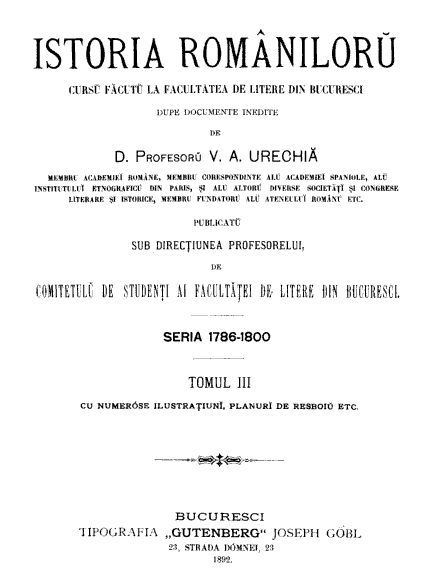
Title page of Istoria românilor, Volume III, 1892

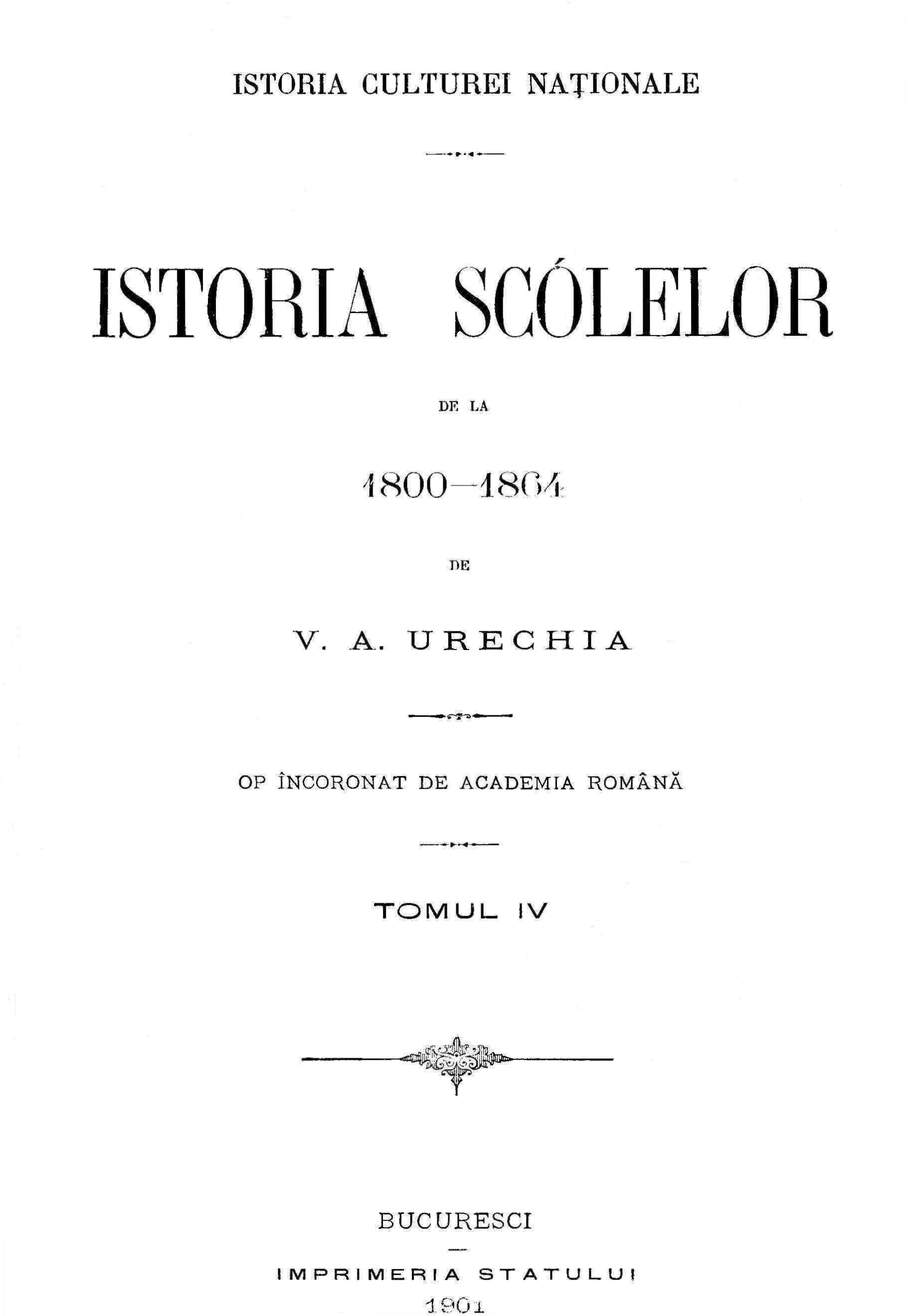
Title page of Istoria școalelor, Volume IV, 1901

In 1881–1882, Urechia was Romania's Education Minister under National Liberal Premiers Dimitrie Brătianu and Ion Brătianu, in the newly proclaimed Kingdom of Romania. According to Călinescu, his appointment had been prepared since 1880. Călinescu cites Urechia's intense correspondence with Alexandru Odobescu, who was then living in Paris. Odobescu had initially asked Urechia to manage his chair at the University, and, Călinescu argues, his tone became "fawning" as Urechia received confirmation for his political ambitions. As Minister, Urechia tasked Odobescu with approaching Hermiona, the widow of French historian Edgar Quinet and daughter of Romanian intellectual Gheorghe Asachi, and recovering some of Quinet's notes for publishing in Albumul macedo-român. While reviewing and reshuffling the Ministry, Urechia dismissed the socialist and atheist activist Ioan Nădejde from his position as teacher, and played a part in the decision to curb the spread of socialism among the faculty of Iași University. However, he cast aside political preferences to assign Junimist author Ion Luca Caragiale the position of inspector in the counties of Suceava and Neamț. Urechia had prepared a program for administrative reform at several levels, but the brevity of his term prevented him from putting it into practice.

By then, Urechia had also begun collaborating with the younger anti-Junimist and later Symbolist poet Alexandru Macedonski. In 1881, Minister Urechia granted Macedonski the Bene-Merenti medal 1st class, even though, Călinescu argues, the poet had been a civil servant for no more than 18 months. A year later, he appointed Macedonski to the post of Historical Monuments Inspector. Also in 1882, he accepted Macedonski's offer to become president of a society formed around the magazine Literatorul. In 1883, following Macedonski's attacks on Junimist author Mihai Eminescu, later recognized as national poet, the irreverent exposure of Eminescu's mental illness and the widespread condemnation which ensued, Literatorul went out of print. It resurfaced sporadically after that date, notably in 1885, as Revista Literară, and continued to receive contributions from Urechia, Anghel Demetriescu, Th. M. Stoenescu and Bonifaciu Florescu, but was eventually turned by Macedonski into a voice for the local Symbolist movement.

Urechia grew disillusioned with National Liberal politics, and voted against his party when he felt that their politics no longer coincided with his own views. By 1885, he also made his peace with Junimea, which was generally offering its support to the newly founded Conservative Party, and became a collaborator of its mouthpiece Convorbiri Literare, contributing essays and stories until 1892. Also in 1885, he published his novella Logof. Baptiste Veleli ("The Logofăt Baptiste Veleli"), set in the 17th century. His varied scientific interests led him to correspond with Iuliu Popper, the Romanian-born explorer of Patagonia, who notably described to Urechia the lawlessness of Punta Arenas, Chile.

Late in his life, V. A. Urechia concentrated on historical research. This led him to write and publish Istoria românilor ("The History of Romanians", 14 vols., 1891–1903) and Istoria școalelor ("The History of Schools", 4 vols., 1892–1901). After 1889, he also resumed activities in the area of bibliography, turning his own collection into a public library to benefit Galați city. He also edited and collected the work of Miron Costin, producing and editing an eponymous 1890 monograph, together with a similar work dedicated to 19th century Moldavian intellectual Gheorghe Asachi. In 1891, his scattered essays, novellas, memoirs and stories based on Romanian folklore themes were collectively published by as Legende române ("Romanian Legends"). That year, he left for London, where he attended the International Congress of Orientalists and received the honorary diploma for supporting the Congress' activities at an international level.

During the final part of the 1880s, V. A. Urechia partook in a scandal involving Lazăr Șăineanu, a foreign-educated Jewish-Romanian linguist, during which time he made a series of antisemitic statements. Șăineanu, who, like most other members of the Jewish community, was not legally emancipated, had been assigned to a Faculty of Letters position by Titu Maiorescu, at the time Education Minister in a Conservative Party cabinet. Urechia and his partisans reacted strongly against this measure, arguing that Șăineanu was made unqualified by his ethnicity, until Șăineanu presented his resignation to Maiorescu.

In 1889, when Șăineanu requested naturalization, Urechia intervened with the National Liberal politician Dimitrie Sturdza, head of a committee charged with enforcing nationality law, asking him to deny the request. A deadlock ensued and, in both 1889 and 1895, the matter came to be deliberated by the Senate. Although it won support from both Conservative Premier Petre P. Carp and the Chamber, Urechia again spoke out against enfranchise in the Senate, and, largely as a result of this appeal, a majority of his colleagues voted with him on both occasions.

=== Cultural League establishment and final years ===
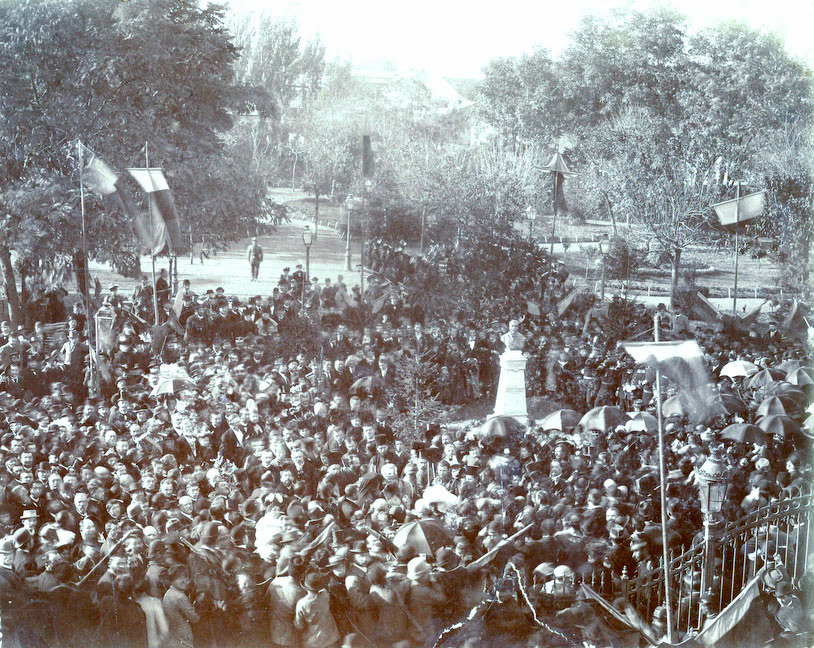
The unveiling of Mihail Kogălniceanu's monument in Galați, an event attended by Urechia (1893)

The early 1890s saw Urechia's involvement in the cause of Romanians living outside the confines of the Old Kingdom. Like other liberal activists, he hoped to see Romania united with Transylvania and the Banat, regions then included in Austria-Hungary and administered by the Kingdom of Hungary. Urechia viewed with sympathy the formation of a National Party in that region, and supported it throughout the Transylvanian Memorandum movement of 1892, when many of its leaders were jailed by Hungarian authorities. He appealed for support throughout Europe, and, in 1893, collected the interventions of his foreign peers in a single volume, known in Romanian as Voci latine. De la frați la frați ("Latin Voices. From Brothers to Brothers"). As leader of the newly founded Cultural League for the Unity of All Romanians, he campaigned in the international press, resulting in some 500 newspaper articles on the Memorandum trial. These actions made partisans of Austria-Hungary regard him as an agent of dissent. In 1894, he was engaged in a heated polemic over these issues with the Hungarian officer István Türr, who had published articles condemning the Memorandum participants and their Bucharest-based partisans. It involved other politicians in 1895, when Urechia attended the Interparliamentary Union's Conference in Brussels, Belgium, and debated the matter with members of the Hungarian legislature.

Urechia was vice-president of the Senate in 1896–1897. During those years, he became Chevalier of the Légion d'honneur, honorary member and later honorary president of the Conseil Héraldique de France, foreign member of the French Archaeological Society, and associate member of the Spanish Red Cross, and Ecuador's consul general to Romania. Attending the October 1899 International Congress of Orientalists in Rome, he organized a Pan-Latinist festivity centered on Trajan's Column, with the participation of Luigi Pelloux cabinet ministers and the Transylvanian peasant activist Badea Cârțan. Although the ceremony enjoyed popularity and coverage in the press, Urechia and his Cultural League were frustrated by lack of funds in their attempt to organize a living exhibit of Romanian customs. He attended the 1900 congress of the Union of Latin Students, meeting in the French town of Alès, and delivered an opening speech in which the main theme was Pan-Latinism. The same year, he published a series of memoirs and travel writing pieces, under the title Din tainele vieții ("Some of Life's Secrets").

Urechia died in Bucharest at age 67. His funeral oration was delivered by archaeologist Grigore Tocilescu, while the Academy's commemorative session was presided over by his former rival Hasdeu.

== Ideology, literary contributions and cultural debates ==
=== Tenets ===
V. A. Urechia was a prolific author, whose bibliography reportedly exceeds 600 individual titles, covering both fiction and scientific works. Reflecting on the period, modern-day historian Lucian Boia argues that, while Urechia stood above all his pro-liberal academic colleagues in respect to his "industriousness", they all lacked scientific competence. Boia, who notes that Urechia's works are generally compilations, concludes that their author was motivated by "fervent but naïve patriotism".

Urechia's main contribution was as an ideologue of the liberal current, and relates to his version of patriotism, called românism ("Romanianism"). Seen by him as distinct from nationalism, it involved the ongoing promotion of a common spiritual identity among Romanians, a focus on popularizing local folklore, and a cultural version of Pan-Latinism. From early on, Urechia argued in favor of a federal Latin bloc to counter the threats of Pan-Slavism and Pan-Germanism. In 1859, a letter he sent to Sardinian Premier Camillo Benso di Cavour, in which he introduced the Moldavian scholarship recipients to the University of Turin, made reference to Pan-Latin sentiments and the Romanian origins: "Turn our young Romanians into something better than savants; make them Latins, proud descendants of Rome, the mother of their nation." Part of his subsequent studies dealt with the comparative linguistics of Romance: like many of his fellow intellectuals, Urechia was determined to find the exact position of Romanian in relation to the Latin language, Standard Italian or Italian dialects (see History of the Romanian language). Thus, in an 1868 essay, Urechia theorized a "parallelism" between Romanian and Friulian, his conclusion being similar to one earlier voiced (and eventually discarded) by Graziadio Isaia Ascoli.

Urechia saw in the application of Romanianism a cultural battle for improvement, writing: "A nation incapable of developing is incapable of defending its existence. This is why all nations, recognizing in culture the primordial condition of their existence and grandeur, have struggled to make use of all their forces in order to advance culturally. [...] For today culture is the strongest and non-invincible weapon." His writings frequently made the controversial claim that Romanians had perfected various elements of human civilization before all other peoples (see protochronism). Based on his theories about social cohesion, Urechia also expressed his distaste for political factionalism. An article of his in Adunarea Națională reacted against the split between the National Liberal group (the "Reds") and the Conservative Party (the "Whites"): "Victory will only be possible when Romanianism is neither red nor white".

Late in his life, the writer coined another term, daco-românism ("Daco-Romanianism"), which referenced the ancient territory of Dacia and, through it, to the ideal of grouping together all territories inhabited by Romanians outside the Old Kingdom's borders. This allusion to Transylvania contributed to his polemic with Austro-Hungarian authorities, who came to regard the term with suspicion. At the same time, Urechia sought to build contacts with representatives of other Romance-speaking communities in the Balkans, Aromanians as well as Megleno-Romanians and Istro-Romanians, as well as with Romanian leaders from Bukovina and Bessarabia. After the Russo-Turkish War, when Romanian rule was extended to formerly Ottoman Northern Dobruja, he called for the region's Romanianization through colonization and changes in toponymy.

Urechia's had conflicting attitudes on the cohabitation of Romanians and ethnic minorities. His Coliba Măriucăi, one of the first novels in Romanian literature to explore social problems from a critical perspective, and written just as slavery was being outlawed in Moldavia, he expresses sympathy for the persecuted Romani community. In contrast with this approach, the statements made by Urechia in his conflict with Lazăr Șăineanu show an antisemitic side to his Romanianism, which academic Michael Shafir rates as "cultural" and "economic" rather than "racial". While debating Șăineanu's status in academia, Urechia claimed: "A person foreign to our nation's fiber could never awaken in the mind and heart of the young generation the image of our past [...]. How will that person recognize those pulsations in the historical life of Romanians, when he has nothing in common with [the people's] aspirations?" Urechia was especially adverse to Șăineanu's study on the traditional references to Jews as "Tatars" and Uriași, as a reference to an Early Medieval presence of Khazars in present-day Romanian territories. He therefore publicly accused Șăineanu of making it seem that the Jews had a historical precedent over Romanians. Literary critic Laszlo Alexandru writes that Urechia's reading of the text was "in bad faith", and his conclusions "slanderous". In 1895, during the final Senate vote on Șăineanu's naturalization, Urechia gave an applauded speech in which he likened the linguist with the Trojan Horse, urging his fellow parliamentarians not to allow "a foreigner into the Romanian citadel".

=== Beția de cuvinte ===
As part of their Romantic reaction against the Junimist call for professionalization, controlled modernization and Westernization, the Revista Contimporană group sought to portray the liberal approach as motivated by historical precedence. George Călinescu writes: "By studying, as superficially and bombastically as they did, a [medieval] chronicler [...], the group sought to inculcate the idea of tradition." Titu Maiorescu had by then reacted against this approach, accusing his adversaries of enforcing "forms without substance" (that is, ill-adapted to the Romanian realities which they claimed to address), and directed his accusations specifically against the University of Bucharest faculty, exposing the heads of department for lacking training in their fields of choice.

Maiorescu replied to his adversaries in Beția de cuvinte, where he emphasized his group's overall rejection and occasional derision of traditional Romanian literature, and commented that both the model and its defenders had produced a characteristically prolix style. The Junimist figure also focused on discussing errors in Urechia's works, particularly when it came to his pronouncements on the philosophy of history. According to Maiorescu, the context had conflated two separate topics into one phrase, and unwittingly made it seem that the 18th-century philosophe Voltaire was active in the 17th century. Călinescu used this point to illustrate Maiorescu's polemic technique, which involved presenting his adversaries with "propositions cruelly selected from the textbook on logic". The text referenced other false claims made by Urechia, questioning his competence. It cited him arguing that the 4th-century Imperial Roman historian Ammianus Marcellinus was a source on the 5th-century rule of Attila the Hun, that philosophers Gottfried Leibniz and René Descartes were historians, and that painter Cimabue was an architect. In what Lucian Boia deems "perhaps [his] most successful page", Maiorescu ridiculed Urechia's claim that 18th-century Wallachian poet Ienăchiță Văcărescu was superior to Germany's Johann Wolfgang von Goethe.

Urechia, Laurian, Ghica and Petru Grădișteanu decided to issue a common reply to Maiorescu's accusations, using Rosetti's newspaper Românul as their venue. One of Urechia's texts in the series accused Maiorescu of "mocking for the urge of mocking", and called Beția de cuvinte "an unqualifiable diatribe". He defended his group as the true representatives of a cultural line leading back to the Wallachian uprising of 1821, and rhetorically asked Maiorescu: "could it be true that in these 50 years all that was planted in the national soil are feather grass and creeping thistle?" Tudor Vianu, who believes Urechia had "too much knowledge of things", cautions that "[his] pen would slide too fast over paper". He defines Urechia's reply as "gauche and prolix". While he criticizes Urechia's views on history, literary historian Zigu Ornea believes that he was justified in opposing Junimist "exclusivism", especially when rejecting Maiorescu's theory that the state needed to redesign its educational system by closing down universities and building more primary schools.

Maiorescu himself answered to his critics in another article, detailing their rebuttals and arguing that they were proof of ignoratio elenchi. Elsewhere, the same critic stated his amusement at reading in Adunarea Națională that the 1859 union had spurred on the Risorgimento and German unification, and that the 1784 Transylvanian rebellion had made possible the French Revolution. An unsigned article published the conservative newspaper Timpul in 1877, believed by Ornea to be the work of Maiorescu, accuses V. A. Urechia, Xenofon Gheorghiu, Nicolae Ionescu, Ștefan Șendrea, Andrei Vizanti and others of being inactive academics and corrupt public figures. Such criticism was being repeated in later years: writing some twenty years later, Urechia expressed his disappointment that a Bucharest journal had more recently mocked his activist stance and had referred to him as a "road junction orator".

== Personal life ==
Urechia's marriage to Luiza produced three children: sons Nestor and Alceu and daughter Corina. The Urechias' relationship, likened by Călinescu to a "Greek tragedy", was the topic of innuendo and scandal. Painter Nicolae Grigorescu was allegedly in love with Luiza Wirth, and painted several portraits of her, including one in the nude. The latter painting was described by Călinescu as "indiscreet [and] voluptuous". Their marriage was allegedly a ménage à trois, involving Luiza's sister Ana. Rumors also had it that the two other Wirth sisters, Carlotta, who was Queen Elisabeth's music tutor, and Emilia, wife of Romanian Army General Staff Chief Nicolae Dona, were also V. A. Urechia's lovers. Such claims of sororal polygyny were notably popularized by Eminescu, who once described Urechia as a "poor fellow who has two keep two sisters as his wives."

Story has it that Dona's son, officer Alexandru Guriță, was Urechia's illegitimate son. Oblivious to this, Guriță had fallen in love with Corina and was planning to marry her, before Urechia stepped in and revealed that they would be committing incest. The two lovers committed suicide. After her divorce from Urechia, Luiza lived with I. G. Cantacuzino; their son was Gheorghe Cantacuzino-Grănicerul, future general and provisional leader of the fascist Iron Guard. In early 1882, after she remarried a man named Hristu Cuțiana, but died in August of the same year.

== Legacy ==
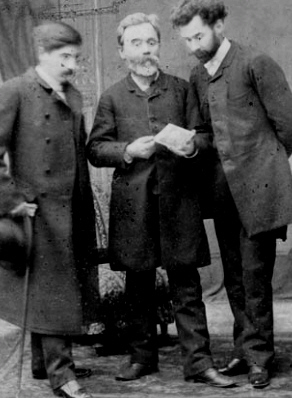
Urechia, flanked by writers Alexandru Vlahuță (left) and Barbu Ștefănescu Delavrancea, in an 1889 photograph

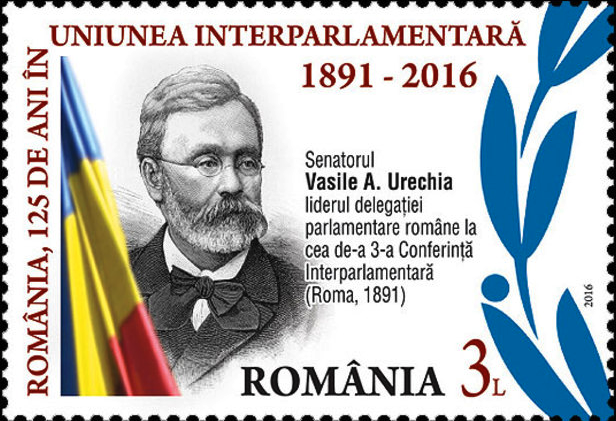
2016 postage stamp commemorating 125 years since Romania joined the Interparliamentary Union and featuring Urechia, who led its first delegation

Junimist sentiments regarding Urechia were backed by several authoritative critics in later periods. Thus, Călinescu dismissed the author's overall contribution to literature as "mawkish", and referred to Legende române as "almost trivial in style." In contrast, Vianu believes the latter to be "entertainingly told". According to the 1995 Cambridge Guide to Theatre, Urechia was "most successful as an author of historical melodramas", but, like his contemporaries George Bengescu-Dabija, Haralamb Lecca, Ronetti Roman and Grigore Ventura, is "no longer in fashion."

From early on, Urechia was defended against criticism by people who shared his views. In his speech to commemorate the writer's death, Bogdan Petriceicu Hasdeu claimed: "As an agitator for the benefit and growth of the Romanian nation, Urechia was sublime; no one shall replace him, nothing shall be able to shadow him when it comes to our national history, in which he will endure as an archangel of enthusiasm in the memory of all Romanians". According to cultural historian Ovidiu Pecican, Hasdeu, with political support from National Liberal leader Ion Brătianu, managed to impose a nationalist cultural model to compete with Junimea, thus ensuring that both Urechia and his rival Șăineanu, alongside George Dem. Teodorescu, Grigore Tocilescu, George Ionescu-Gion, Alexandru Vlahuță and other Bucharest-based figures, addressed an alternative and autonomous milieu. Partly building on the observations made by literary critic Alexandru George, Ornea notes that, for all his "real inadequacies", Urechia "was but moreover became incontestably superior to many members of [Junimea] who were much amused when reading Maiorescu's admirable lampoon." Ornea also concluded that, with his final historical works, particularly Istoria școalelor, Urechia contributed texts "relevant to this day". Although Maiorescu's early treatment of Urechia's work left an enduring impact on his public image, the author came to be viewed with more sympathy during the 20th century. Among the influential monographs which reclaimed part of his writings was one published by Alexandru George in 1976. According to Ornea, it and other such works "reclaim a fairer and more lenient posterity." Urechia's work as a teacher and cultural promoter also reflected on intellectual life: dramatist Alexandru Davila was one of the V. A. Urechia Institute graduates, and, according to Tudor Vianu, Urechia's post-1870s support for Macedonski, together with similar efforts by Ionescu-Gion, Tocilescu, Anghel Demetriescu, Bonifaciu Florescu, Th. M. Stoenescu, was largely responsible for passing down "a better and truer image of the abused poet."

After World War I, Alceu Urechia issued protests against the intellectual establishment, who, he argued, had obscured his father's contribution to the historical process whereby Greater Romania had been created. Historian Nicolae Iorga, who took over chairmanship of the Cultural League in 1932, paid tribute to his predecessor, referring to his "unbound wish to be of service in every area and his great talent to win over by means of an appealing form of vanity".

Although their author was the recipient of much criticism over his inconsistencies, V. A. Urechia's books enjoyed a steady popularity. This was in particular the case with Legende române, parts of which were translated into Italian. Unlike his other texts, Legende was prevented by Hungarian censors from circulating within Transylvania, and had to make its way in only through the Cisleithanian part of the monarchy. It was republished in a 1904 definitive edition by Editura Socec. His Albumul macedo-român and Voci latine were placed by art historian Gheorghe Oprescu among "the most beautiful and elegant turn-of-the-century Romanian books." In 1878, to mark his presence at the International Congress of Anthropological and Ethnological Sciences, the Société d'Ethnographie presented Urechia with a bust in his likeness, sculpted by Wladimir Hegel. Thirty-three years later, his Transylvanian collaborators dedicated him an album, which included a poem written especially for him by George Coșbuc. Urechia's book collection, which he had turned into a public library, is managed by the city of Galați.

In addition to the writings of his adversaries Maiorescu and Eminescu, Urechia was the subject of satirical pieces written by various other authors. They include his employee Ronetti Roman and the Junimist figure Iacob Negruzzi. Grigorescu's portraits of Luiza Urechia, including the nude (which is said to be worth 100,000 euros), found their way into the art collection of General Dona's son, physician Iosif Dona, and were later inherited by the National Museum of Art. The museum lost ownership of the entire Dona collection in 2007, after its property rights were successfully disputed in court by rival claimants.
