= Urechia =

Urechia is a surname. Notable people with the surname include:

- Nestor Urechia (1866–1931), Romanian prose writer
- V. A. Urechia (1834–1901), Moldavian historian
