= Alexandru Mușina =

Alexandru Muşina (Romanian pronunciation: [alekˈsandru muˈʃina]; July 1, 1954, in Sibiu – June 19, 2013, in Brasov) was a Romanian poet, essayist, and editor born in Sibiu.

He studied literature at the University of Bucharest in the late 1970s and published poetry in the 1980s beginning with Cinci in 1982.

He obtained a doctorate in literature from the University of Bucharest in 1996.

== Poems ==
Poems:

- Cinci, la Editura "Litera", în 1982,
- Strada Castelului 104, Editura "C.R.", 1984
- Lucrurile pe care le-am văzut (1979–1986), Ed. "C.R.", 1992 (poezie);
- Aleea Mimozei nr. 3, Ed. "Pontica", 1993 (poezie);
- Tomografia şi alte explorări, Ed. "Marineasa", 1994 (poezie);
- Album duminical, Biblioteca "Poesis", 1994 (poezie)
- Budila-Express, Ed. "Cresphis", Paris, 1995 (poezie);
- Tea, Ed. "Axa", 1997 (poezie);
- Şi animalele sunt oameni!, Ed. "Aula", 2000 (poezii pentru copii);
- Personae, Ed. "Aula", 2001 (poezie);
- Hinterland, Ed. "Aula", 2003 (poezie);
- Poeme alese (1975–2001), Ed. "Aula", 2003 (poezie);

== Essays ==
Essays:

- Unde se află poezia?, Ed. "Arhipelag", 1996 (eseuri);
- Paradigma poeziei moderne, Ed. "Leka Brâncuş", 1996, ed. a II-a, Ed. "Aula", 2004 (eseu). Porneşte de la teza sa de doctorat;
- Eseu asupra poeziei moderne, Ed. "Cartier", 1997 (eseu);
- Sinapse, Ed. "Aula", 2001 (eseuri);
- Supravieţuirea prin ficţiune, Ed. "Aula", 2005 (eseuri);
- Antropologie culturală şi folclor
