= Ovidiu Pecican =

Romanian historian and author (born 1959)

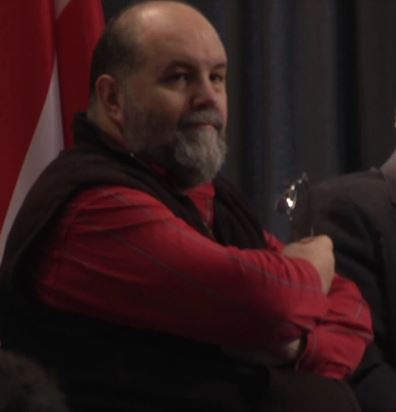
- Ovidiu Pecican in 2012
- Born: January 8, 1959 (age 67); Arad
- Occupations: historian, essayist, novelist, short story writer, literary critic, playwright, journalist, poet
- Writing career
- Period: 1978–
- Genres: science fiction, experimental theater
- Subjects: Medieval history, historiography, social history, cultural history, history of Romania, politics of Romania

Ovidiu Coriolan Pecican (born January 8, 1959) is a Romanian historian, essayist, novelist, short-story writer, literary critic, poet, playwright, and journalist of partly Serbian origin. He is especially known for his political writings on disputed issues such as regional autonomy for Transylvania, and for his co-authorship of a controversial history textbook for 11th and 12th grade high-school students.

Pecican is co-editor of Caietele Tranziției and a contributor to major newspapers, including Contemporanul, Cotidianul, and Ziarul Financiar. He has also written works of science fiction, mainstream literature and cultural history studies. Since 1994, he has been a member of the Romanian Writers' Union.

== Biography ==
=== Career ===
Born in Arad, Pecican graduated from the University of Cluj-Napoca (currently known as the Babeș-Bolyai University, UBB) in 1985. He published his first short story in 1978. During the late 1970s, he was active in the underground movie-making movement in his native city, as a member of the Atelier 16 Club, together with Gheorghe Sabău, Mircea Mihăieş, Ioan T. Morar, Valentin Constantin, Alexandru Pecican and others. As a student, between 1981 and 1985, he became a staff member of the periodicals Napoca Universitară and Echinox. Regularly featured in various literary magazines, his prose was first edited in a single volume in 1990 (Eu și maimuța mea, "Me and My Monkey" — published by Editura Dacia).

Between 1985 and 1990, Pecican worked as a high school teacher of history in Lipova, Arad County; between 1991 and 1994, he was a researcher for the UBB's Center for Transylvanian Studies (Centrul de Studii Transilvane), before becoming a Lecturer at the UBB (1994). The recipient of a BA in History and Philosophy (1985) and of a PhD in Medieval History (1998), both from the UBB, he specialized in the social and cultural history of Central and Southeastern Europe.

In 1994, Pecican published a book of interviews with novelist Nicolae Breban (O utopie tangibilă, "A Tangible Utopia"; Editura Didactică şi Pedagogică). In 1995, he also authored, together with Horaţiu Mihaiu, the experimental theater show 17 acte cu Piet Mondrian ("17 Acts with Piet Mondrian"), which was hosted by the National Theater in Cluj-Napoca, before being showcased at the Belgrade Summer Festival and winning several Romanian awards. After 1997, books by him were published yearly or in several volumes each year.

Pecican is a Professor (since 2004) and was Chancellor at the Babeș-Bolyai University Faculty of European Studies (1997–1999) and served on the staff of the UBB's "The European Idea" Foundation for European Studies as its first manager (1997–1999). He has been the recipient of TEMPUS grants from the University of Sussex, Utrecht University, the University of Münster, the University of Milan, and the INALCO, as well as receiving grants from the Central European University, Michigan State University and a DAAD grant from the University of Münster.

He is a coordinator of the Other Europes series for the foundation's publishing house, EFES, and, between 2001 and 2005, he headed another publishing house, founded by the Desire Foundation. He also coordinates the Limb series for the Limes Publishing House. Pecican was also head of the Post-Totalitarian Studies, an office he shared with Emil Boc (who was a lecturer at the time). He has edited Romanian-language versions of, among others, works by Geoffroy de Villehardouin (De la Conquête de Constantinople), Robert de Clari (La Conquête de Constantinople), Bogdan Petriceicu Hasdeu (Olteneștile), and Yves Ternon (L'État criminel).

=== Sigma textbook ===
In late 1999, when the Ministry of Education, led by Andrei Marga at the time, decided to allow new textbooks to be published as alternatives to the official ones in use, Pecican, together with Sorin Mitu, Lucia Copoeru, Virgiliu Țârău, and Liviu Țîrău, published a version of a 12th grade manual of Romanian history with Editura Sigma. The volume was submitted to Ministry approval, and caused a political scandal after its content became known to the public — its critics argued that it lacked structure and balance, that it discarded traditional historiography in themes and discourse, and even that part of the information was purely trivial. Pecican identified most of these concerns with support for nationalist tenets, and argued they were unscientific.

The volume was immediately faced with criticism from the ultra-nationalist opposition group Greater Romania Party, through the voice of Anghel Stanciu (who called the textbook "anti-national"). Soon after, Romania's largest opposition group at the time, the Social Democratic Party, joined in the protest, and Parliamentary groups from outside the governing Romanian Democratic Convention (CDR) issued a formal protest: their motion was rejected on November 15, but the scandal, deepened by major coverage in the press, probably contributed to weakening support for the CDR.

Academia was divided over the issue: while the Romanian Academy expressed concern that the Sigma textbook was not up to educational standards. Several, especially young, historians supported it. The National Liberal politician and historian Adrian Cioroianu, himself the co-author of a new manual and a vocal critic of the methods of Pecican's adversaries during the polemic, publicly sided with the Sigma authors, and argued in their favor during televised confrontations with Marius Tucă and Octavian Paler.

Eventually, the original version failed to win Ministry approval. In later editions, the Sigma textbook was published with significant changes in content. In 2002, the PSD Minister Ecaterina Andronescu removed it from the list of endorsed textbooks, which caused Pecican to issue a formal protest, supported by, among others, the historian and West University professor Victor Neumann. Both Pecican and Neumann expressed concerns that this was signaling a return to official history, and made mention of inconsistencies in educational policies.

=== 2001 Memorandum ===
With Molnar Gusztav, Smaranda Enache, Marius Cotmeanu, Miklós Bakk and other Romanian and Magyar intellectuals from Transylvania, Pecican founded the Provincia Group around the magazine Provincia (April 2000); it was created as an advocacy group in favor of debating the majority-minority relationship in Romania, dedicated to reshaping Romanian administrative policies and renouncing centralism. On December 8, 2001, it issued a Memorandum calling for a public debate on the issue of Transylvanian autonomy.

The Memorandum drew criticism from several sources. In an editorial for Ziua, Adrian Cioroianu expressed his own support for a degree of decentralization, but argued that the document was unrealistic in its assumptions and more radical goals, and that it did not represent a unitary perspective on the issue. The Memorandum was dismissed outright by President Ion Iliescu, a gesture which prompted Pecican to address him in an open letter. The more nationalist political forces called on authorities to indict the document's authors, based on an interpretation of the Constitution of Romania.

=== Other polemics ===
In late October 2005, the journalist Melania Mandaș Vergu published an article in Gândul on the issue of Pecican's alleged candidature for government office in Prime Minister Călin Popescu-Tăriceanu's Justice and Truth cabinet. The article made reference to Pecican's involvement in the textbook scandal (focusing on a reference to "Decebalus' sensual lips", made in the Sigma volume) and identified Pecican's ideas with those of Sabin Gherman, the advocate of a high degree of Transylvanian autonomy (it alleged that Pecican shared Gherman's statement "I'm all fed up with Romania!"). Replying in Cotidianul, Pecican dismissed the tone and content of the article as "deliberate manipulation and distortion", while recalling that, during the 1999 polemic, the respective journalist had published what he called "curse words" (sudălmi) aimed at Sigma authors.

Also in 2005, Pecican was among the group of intellectuals who reacted to the controversial views held by the exiled writer Paul Goma on issues involving Bessarabia and World War II Romanian history. Alongside Radu Ioanid, Michael Shafir, Laszlo Alexandru, Andrei Oişteanu and others, he accused Goma of Antisemitism and Holocaust denial, and concluded that his Săptămîna Roșie volume, reflecting Goma's theory on the Soviet occupation of Bessarabia, was spurious.

His polemics include the one against the new treatise on Romanian history, published by the Romanian Academy beginning 2002. Coordinated by the historians Dan Berindei and Virgil Cândea, the large collective work was sharply criticized also by Șerban Papacostea, Leon Șimanschi, Ștefan Andreescu and some other historians for alleged ethical problems, but Pecican accused the synthesis for its perceived nationalist and statist views. Later, when one of the authors, Mihai Bărbulescu, reacted against Pecican's arguments, the latter answered and presented new arguments.

== Work ==
=== Medieval studies and historiography ===
Ovidiu Pecican's main contribution to medieval studies addresses the first stages of Romanian culture. Trapped between Eastern Orthodox ethos and Slavonic language, on one hand, and the Western or Latin influences, on the other, the old Romanian culture of the 11th-17th centuries faced a large variety of challenges, and showed a remarkable diversity. Pecican uncovered the prehistory of various enigmatic texts, reconstituting both lost texts and contexts, as well as the image of a whole written culture expressing the choices made by medieval Romanians in the Balkans and the territory between Danube and the Carpathians.

Troia, Veneția, Roma (1998) deals with the imagined homelands of the Vlachs as they result from old written fragments conserved in later contexts, laying out some of the main characteristics of Romanian identity at the time of its first making. The cultural origins of the Romanians' negative self-image, both inherited and developed, is the topic of Pecican's Lumea lui Simion Dascălul (1998), where he attempts to define the cultural elites of Early Modern Moldavia (17th century) and to determine the reasons why Simion Dascălul, one of the leading Romanian chroniclers of the time, is misunderstood. Pecican's Arpadieni, Angevini, români (2001) focuses on the Romanian-origin lesser nobility in the Kingdom of Hungary under the Árpáds and the Angevins until the end of the 14th century; the volume contradicts both Romanian and Hungarian historiographic tradition, which have traditionally claimed that Romanians were only serfs under Hungarian rule or that Romanians were brought from the Balkans and into Transylvania only to guard the Hungarian border. The volume raised debates between the author and historian Ioan-Aurel Pop, who claimed that Pecican's views favored the Hungarians. Realități imaginate și ficțiuni adevărate în evul mediu românesc (2002) and Trecutul istoric si omul evului mediu (2002) center on newly discovered medieval historical writings from Transylvania, Wallachia and Moldavia. They include annals from the times of Wallachian Prince Vlad III the Impaler, as well as from previous and subsequent periods, which, Pecican indicates, show the vitality of a culture in its development and the dialog with the neighboring cultures.

The debate on regionalism prompted Ovidiu Pecican to write a new book on the regional political forms before and after the founding of the Danubian Principalities, under the title of Originile istorice ale regionalismului românesc (2003). The historian argues against the essentialist image of the nation-state, and points to a rich originality of political forms, autonomy experiments on the lower Danube and in the Carpathians, foreign influences and original answers.

Some of the other volumes written by Pecican also reflect his questioning of official versions provided for the past. Sânge și trandafiri. Cultura ero(t)ică in Moldova lui Ștefan cel Mare (2005) attempts to provide the reader with a different image of the national hero Stephen the Great, Prince of Moldavia (1457–1504), who was sanctified by the Romanian Orthodox Church. The volume focuses on erotic and heroic mixture of instinct and behavior at Stephen's court, as it appears to have been reflected in literature and arts of his time. In Între cruciați și tătari (2006), the attempt is to understand the challenges confronting post-1989 Romania and its longing for integration into NATO and the European Union, by comparing them with the years between the Fourth Crusade (1204) and the Mongol Invasion (1241–1243), when the Western world extended itself down to the Carpathians.

Pecican is also interested in how Eastern European culture developed in contact with the Western culture during the 19th and 20th centuries. Hașdeenii. O odisee a receptării (2003) and B. P. Hasdeu istoric (2004), books developed from his PhD thesis, attempt to explain how, through the efforts of several leading intellectuals during the second part of the 19th century, modern nationalism, together with liberalism, formed a nationalist identity. Poarta leilor. Istoriografia tânară din Transilvania (Vol.I: 2005; Vol.II: 2006) is a synthesis concerning the young historiography from Transylvania after the Romanian Revolution of 1989, investigating its attraction to the Western model and its polemic with the nationalist-communist autochthonous model as developed by the Communist regime.

=== Novels ===
Pecican's first novel, Eu și maimuța mea, written in 1994, speaks about love in a psychiatric hospital in the times of Nicolae Ceauşescu's dictatorship. The modular formula of the narrative contributes to creating a lyric atmosphere, underlying the contrast between the purity of the love story, on one hand, and the dark context, on the other.

Later in the same year, Ovidiu Pecican and his cousin, Alexandru Pecican, completed work on a second novel, Razzar, a mythical and archetypal metaphor of the human destiny elaborated within the literary conventions of the science fiction genre. Razzar received the Nemira Publishing House Prize for novels in 1998.

Nine years later, Pecican published a third novel, Imberia, which depicts the daily dilemmas a young intellectual has to face in post-communist Romania during the transition period (including sexual alienation and the trauma of his father's death).

== Published volumes ==
=== Authored ===
- Eu și maimuța mea, 1990. ISBN 973-35-0145-X
- Un român în lagărele sovietice, 1991. OCLC 28586717
- Europa - o idee în mers, 1997. ISBN 973-98268-2-2
- Troia, Veneția, Roma, 1998
- Lumea lui Simion Dascălul, 1998
- Romania and the European Integration, 1998. ISBN 973-99627-0-X
- Arpadieni, Angevini, români. Studii de medievistică central-europeană, 2001. ISBN 973-85512-5-0
- Clipuri, 2001
- Darul acestei veri, 2001
- Realități imaginate și ficțiuni adevărate în evul mediu românesc, 2002. ISBN 973-35-1439-X
- Trecutul istoric și omul evului mediu, 2002
- Hașdeenii. O odisee a receptării, 2003. ISBN 973-85833-4-9
- Originile istorice ale regionalismului românesc, 2003
- B. P. Hasdeu - istoric, 2004
- Rebel fără pauză, 2004. ISBN 973-86872-4-1
- Poarta leilor. Istoriografia tânară din Transilvania, I, 2005. ISBN 973-7651-11-1
- Sânge și trandafiri. Cultura ero(t)ică in Moldova lui Ștefan cel Mare, 2005
- Zilele și nopțile după-amiezei, 2005
- Imberia, 2006
- Între cruciați și tătari, 2006
- Puncte de atac, 2006
- Poarta leilor. Istoriografia tânără din Transilvania, II, 2006
- Ce istorie scriem, 2006
- Trasee culturale Nord - Sud, 2006. ISBN 978-973-9279-83-3
- Istorii intersectate, 2007
- Troia, Veneția, Roma, I, 2007
- Povești de umbră și povești de soare, 2008

=== Co-authored ===
- with Horaţiu Mihaiu: 17 acte cu Piet Mondrian
- with Enikö Magyari-Vincze: Transition in Central and Eastern Europe, 1997
- with Alexandru Pecican: Razzar, 1998
- with Sorin Mitu, Lucia Copoeru, Virgiliu Țârău, and Liviu Țîrău: Istoria românilor. Manual pentru clasa a XI-a and Istoria românilor. Manual pentru clasa a XII-a, 1999
- with Mihai Pătraşcu: Acasă înseamnă Europa, 2003
- with Gheorghe Grigurcu and Laszlo Alexandru: Vorbind, 2004
- with Laszlo Alexandru and Ion Solacolu: Spirala. Paul Goma și problema antisemitismului, 2004
- with Alexandru Pecican: Arta rugii (theater), 2007 (prize from the Cluj branch of the Union of Romanian Writers)

=== Other ===
- O utopie tangibilă (interviews with Nicolae Breban), 1994
