= Nestor Urechia =

Romanian prose writer

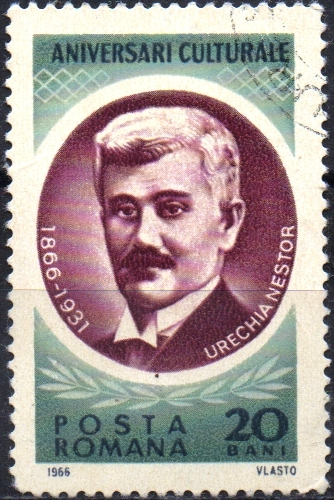
1966 postage stamp issued in commemoration of Urechia's centenary

Nestor Urechia (May 1, 1866–April 9, 1931) was a Romanian prose writer.

Born in Bucharest, his parents were historian and writer V. A. Urechia and his wife Luiza (née Wirth-Pester). From 1874 to 1885, he attended primary and high school at a private institute. Then, from 1886 to 1897, he went to École Polytechnique and École des Ponts et Chaussées in Paris. In 1897, he became a professor at the National School for Bridges and Roads in Bucharest. His first published work was the short story "Moartea lui P.", which appeared in Literatorul in 1882. From 1898 to 1916, he was in charge of the Câmpina-Predeal national highway. From 1917 to 1920, he was a director in the Public Works Ministry. From 1920 to 1929, he headed the school for public works directors.

Urechia's published books include Conferințe (1901); Un proiect de geografie socială a României (1902), where he planned out sociological research; Zânele din Valea Cerbului. Povești pentru copii (1904), reprinted in sixteen editions through 1987; Dans les Carpathes roumaines, Paris (1906), the French version of what later appeared as În Bucegi (1907); and the monograph Drumul Brașovului (1913). His contributions appeared in Revista nouă, Viața literară și artistică, România viitoare, La Roumanie, Printre hotare and La Politique. Fermecătoarea natură, an anthology, appeared in 1924. He was chief editing secretary of Propilee literare magazine from 1926 to 1930, where he used the pen names Ortens, N. Pan, Ortens Anineanu, Bucegicus, N. Jnepeanu, Stroie Miclescu and Nestor for travel accounts and sketches on the history of tourism.

Urechia belonged to the tourists' society, the wanderers' inn and the Romanian touring club. He was a tireless traveler, for whom the "poetry of the horizons" was a remedy for pain and sadness, and was among the precursors of Romanian tourism literature. His 1916 book Robinsonii Bucegilor won a prize from the Romanian Academy.
