= Uriaș =

Romanian-language designation of giants

Uriaș (plural uriași) is the common Romanian-language designation of giants, who are prominent figures in Romanian folklore. There are several varieties of uriași, who share most of their traits but have different names from one historical region of Romania to another.

Jidovi is the term used mainly in Oltenia, and its bearers are supposed to be creators of large mounds, and, in some legends, they play an evil role.

Novaci is used mainly in Muntenia, for creatures who are mainly associated with the Southern Carpathians.

== See also ==
- Romanian folklore
- Romanian folk music
