= Laszlo Alexandru =

Romanian writer, translator, specialist in education

- Born: 4 May 1966 (age 60); Cluj
- Occupations: essayist, literary critic, literary historian, translator, journalist, professor
- Writing career
- Period: 1996–
- Genres: literature, language, history
- Subjects: Dante, Medieval literature, Italian literature, Italian language, cultural history, historiography, Holocaust studies, translation studies, French literature

Laszlo Alexandru (born 4 May 1966, Cluj) is a Romanian essayist, literary critic, literary historian, translator and journalist. He is an Italian teacher. He is editor of E-Leonardo cultural magazine and coordinator of the Italian collection at the "Ecou Transilvan" Publishing House. He is known for his Dante interpretation contributions in the university field in Romania and in Europe, in the Romanian culture and in the Italian culture. Also known in Israel for his cultural studies on the Holocaust. Since 2014, he is a member of the Romanian Writers' Union. His books have been published in Romania, in the Republic of Moldova and in Italy. He won the Romanian Writers' 2020 Special Award for Lectura lui Dante. Infernul; Purgatoriul; Paradisul. Knight (Cavaliere) of the Order of the Star of Italy by decree of the President of the Republic, on the recommendation of the Minister of the Foreign Affairs. He won the Romanian Writers' 2025 Translation Award for Luigi Pirandello, Nuvele pentru un an (15 vol).

== Biography ==
Born in Cluj, Laszlo graduated from the Babeș-Bolyai University (UBB), Cluj-Napoca, in 1989. He participated at the anti-communist rebellion from Cluj, in December 1989. He briefly described, in several published texts, the circumstances in which some revolutionaries from Cluj were shot.

== Career ==
Since 1992, he is a teacher of Italian at George Barițiu National College in Cluj-Napoca. Editorial debut in 1996 with the volume Între Icar și Anteu. Ph.D. in Letters with the thesis Criticul literar Nicolae Manolescu, UBB, 1999.

== Works ==
=== Romanian literature ===
- Între Icar și Anteu, Cluj, Dacia, 1996, ISBN 973350582X;
- Orient Expres, Cluj, Dacia, 1999, ISBN 9733508853;
- Grîul și neghina, Chișinău, Știința, 2002, ISBN 9975672949;
- Criticul literar Nicolae Manolescu, Cluj, Dacia, 2003, ISBN 9733516473; second edition, Pitești, Paralela 45, 2009, ISBN 9789734706624;
- Vorbind, with Gheorghe Grigurcu and Ovidiu Pecican, Cluj, Limes, 2004, ISBN 9737260066;
- Toate pînzele sus!, Cluj, Grinta, 2005, ISBN 9737651049;
- Viceversa!, Timișoara, Bastion, 2008, ISBN 9789731980249;
- Muzeul figurilor de ceară, Pitești, Paralela 45, 2009, ISBN 9789734706013;
- Viața de zi cu zi. Însemnări pe blog (2010), București, Herg Benet Publishers, 2011, ISBN 9786068335018;
- Exerciții de singurătate. Însemnări pe blog (2011), București, Herg Benet Publishers, 2012, ISBN 9786068335384;
- Tutti frutti. Însemnări pe blog (2012), București, Herg Benet Publishers, 2013, ISBN 9786068335759;
- Uriașe lucruri mici. Însemnări pe blog (2013), București, Herg Benet Publishers, 2014, ISBN 9786068530703;
- Stări de spirit. Însemnări pe blog (2014-2017), Cluj, Ecou Transilvan, 2018, ISBN 9786067303834;
- Conferințe literare, Cluj, Casa Cărții de Știință, 2019, ISBN 9786061714346;
- Cum se inventează un huligan? Mihail Sebastian, ziarist la "Cuvîntul", Chișinău, Cartier, 2019, ISBN 9789975863810;
- Viață șocantă. Scrieri despre evrei, Saga, Israel, Ecou Transilvan, Cluj, România, 2021, ISBN 9786067308174;

=== Italian language and literature ===
- Dicționar italian-român, Cluj, Dacia, 1999, ISBN 973350839X;
- Dicționar practic italian-român și român-italian, Cluj, Dacia, 2003, ISBN 9733516562;
- Dicționar italian-român, român-italian, Chișinău, Știința, 2006, ISBN 9789975675338, ISBN 9789975675345; second edition, Chișinău, Știința, 2016, ISBN 9789975850100, ISBN 9789975850117;
- Memorator de limba italiană. Gramatică practică, Cluj, Eikon, 2007, ISBN 9789737570857; second edition, Cluj, Ed. Casa Cărții de Știință, 2015, ISBN 9786061708284; third edition, Cluj, Ecou Transilvan, 2018, ISBN 9786067304329; fourth edition, Cluj, Ed. Ecou Transilvan, 2023, ISBN 9786067309966;
- Prin pădurea întunecată. Dialoguri despre Dante, with Ovidiu Pecican, București, Vinea, 2011, ISBN 9789736983191;
- A revedea stelele. Contribuții la studiul operei lui Dante, Cluj, Ed. Casa Cărții de Știință, 2013, ISBN 9786061703395; second edition, Cluj, Ecou Transilvan, 2018, ISBN 9786067304305;
- Per la selva oscura. Dante parlato, in collaborazione con Ovidiu Pecican, traduzione italiana di Laszlo Alexandru, illustrazioni di Alexandru Pecican, con la presentazione di Patrizio Trequattrini, București, Vinea, 2013, ISBN 9789736983597; seconda edizione, Cluj, Editura Ecou Transilvan, 2021, ISBN 9786067307436;
- Antologia di letteratura italiana per le scuole, Cluj, Ecou Transilvan, 2018, ISBN 9786067304312;
- Lectura lui Dante. Infernul, Chișinău, Cartier, 2020, 624 p., ISBN 9789975864619; second edition, Chișinău, Cartier, 2026, 645 p., ISBN 9789975869416;
- Lectura lui Dante. Purgatoriul, Chișinău, Cartier, 2020, 664 p., ISBN 9789975864626; second edition, Chișinău, Cartier, 2026, 677 p., ISBN 9789975869423;
- Lectura lui Dante. Paradisul, Chișinău, Cartier, 2020, 680 p., ISBN 9789975864633; second edition, Chișinău, Cartier, 2026, 693 p., ISBN 9789975869430;
- A urca la stele. Noi contribuții la studiul lui Dante, Cluj, Ed. Ecou Transilvan, 2023, ISBN 9786303110721;
- Le mie avventure con Dante. Conferenze, prefazione di Lia Bronzi, introduzione critica di Massimo Seriacopi, Italia, Firenze, Edizioni Setteponti, 2026, ISBN 9791282169417.

=== Translations ===
==== French-Romanian ====
- Romain Gary (Emile Ajar), Ai toată viața înainte, novel, Buc., Univers, 1993, ISBN 9733401986; second edition: 2006; third edition: 2013; fourth edition: 2020;
- Raymond Queneau, Zazie în metrou, novel, preface by Luca Pițu, Pitești, Paralela 45, 2001, ISBN 9735934019; second edition: 2004; third edition: 2008;
- Raymond Queneau, Sîntem mereu prea buni cu femeile, novel, Pitești, Paralela 45, 2005, ISBN 9736975568;
- Catherine Siguret, Femei celebre pe divan (Colette, Virginia Woolf, Marlene Dietrich, Josephine Baker, Simone de Beauvoir, Edith Piaf, Maria Callas, Jackie Kennedy, Dalida, Françoise Sagan, Lady Diana), București, Curtea Veche Publishing, 2009, ISBN 9789736696244.

==== Italian-Romanian ====
- Luigi Accattoli, Karol Wojtyla. Omul sfîrșitului de mileniu, Cluj, Viața Creștină, 1999, ISBN 9739288219;
- Renzo Allegri, Padre Pio. Omul speranței, Cluj, Unitas, 2001, ISBN 9738509408; second edition, 2002; third edition, Cluj, Casa de Editură Viața Creștină, 2011, ISBN 9738427029;
- Umberto Eco, A spune cam același lucru. Experiențe de traducere, Iași, Polirom, 2008, ISBN 9789734612109;
- Giovanni Papini, Dante viu, Bistrița, Pergamon, 2009, ISBN 9786069206126;
- Patrizio Trequattrini, Furio, Cluj, Eikon, 2010, ISBN 9789737573162;
- Patrizio Trequattrini, Șantajul, București, Herg Benet Publishers, 2011, ISBN 9786068335049;
- Andrea Tornielli, Domenico Agasso jr., Sfaturi prietenești de la Papa Francisc. Cuvinte care ne ajută să trăim mai bine, Cluj, Viața Creștină, 2017, ISBN 9789736741449;
- Luigi Pirandello, Nuvele pentru un an, Volumul 1, Șalul negru, Cluj, Ecou Transilvan, 2019, ISBN 9786067304992;
- Luigi Pirandello, Nuvele pentru un an, Volumul 2, Viața goală, Cluj, Ecou Transilvan, 2019, ISBN 9786067305005;
- Luigi Pirandello, Nuvele pentru un an, Volumul 3, Țopăiala, Cluj, Ecou Transilvan, 2020, ISBN 9786067306156;
- Luigi Pirandello, Nuvele pentru un an, Volumul 4, Bărbatul singur, Cluj, Ecou Transilvan, 2020, ISBN 9786067306163;
- Luigi Pirandello, Nuvele pentru un an, Volumul 5, Musca, Cluj, Ecou Transilvan, 2021, ISBN 9786067307344;
- Luigi Pirandello, Nuvele pentru un an, Volumul 6, În liniște, Cluj, Ecou Transilvan, 2021, ISBN 9786067307351;
- Fabio Rosini, Arta vindecării. Femeia cu hemoragie și calea vieții sănătoase, Cluj, Viața Creștină, 2021, ISBN 9789736741937;
- Luigi Pirandello, Nuvele pentru un an, Volumul 7, Toate trei, Cluj, Ecou Transilvan, 2022, ISBN 9786067308600;
- Luigi Pirandello, Nuvele pentru un an, Volumul 8, De la nas la cer, Cluj, Ecou Transilvan, 2022, ISBN 9786067308617;
- Luigi Pirandello, Nuvele pentru un an, Volumul 9, Donna Mimma, Cluj, Ecou Transilvan, 2023, ISBN 9786303110011;
- Luigi Pirandello, Nuvele pentru un an, Volumul 10, Bătrînul Dumnezeu, Cluj, Ecou Transilvan, 2023, ISBN 9786303110028;
- Enrico del Gaudio, Caino uccide ancora / Cain ucide din nou, Bilingual Volume, Cluj, Editura Ecou Transilvan, 2023, ISBN 9786303110714;
- Luigi Pirandello, Nuvele pentru un an, Volumul 11, Chiupul, Cluj, Editura Ecou Transilvan, 2024, ISBN 9786303111216;
- Luigi Pirandello, Nuvele pentru un an, Volumul 12, Călătoria, Cluj, Editura Ecou Transilvan, 2024, ISBN 9786303111223;
- Luigi Pirandello, Nuvele pentru un an, Volumul 13, Candelora, Cluj, Editura Ecou Transilvan, 2025, ISBN 9786303112411;
- Luigi Pirandello, Nuvele pentru un an, Volumul 14, Berecche și războiul, Cluj, Editura Ecou Transilvan, 2025, ISBN 9786303112428;
- Luigi Pirandello, Nuvele pentru un an, Volumul 15, O zi, Cluj, Editura Ecou Transilvan, 2025, ISBN 9786303112435.

==== Romanian-Italian ====
- Accademia Romena; Istituto di Archeologia e Storia dell’Arte; Associazione per le Relazioni Culturali fra Italia e Romania, Omaggio a Dinu Adamesteanu, traduzione italiana: Grațiana Alicu, Laszlo Alexandru; traduzione francese: Tiberiu Toader, Cluj, Clusium, 1996, ISBN 9735550962;
- Laszlo Alexandru, Per la selva oscura. Dante parlato, in collaborazione con Ovidiu Pecican, traduzione italiana di Laszlo Alexandru, illustrazioni di Alexandru Pecican, con la presentazione di Patrizio Trequattrini, București, Ed. Vinea, 2013, ISBN 9789736983597; seconda edizione, Cluj, Editura Ecou Transilvan, 2021, ISBN 9786067307436;
- Gelu Hossu, Il Card. Iuliu Hossu. Spirito della Verità, traduzione italiana di Laszlo Alexandru, Cluj, Casa de Editură Viața Creștină, 2019, ISBN 9789736741623;
- Mirela Duma, Haiku, traduzione italiana di Laszlo Alexandru, Aversa, Italia, Pasquale Gnasso Editore, 2020, ISBN 9788894962352;
- Marcel Mureșeanu, Anul de sticlă / L'anno di vetro, ediție bilingvă, traducere în italiană de Laszlo Alexandru, prefață de Ion Mureșan, postfață de Horia Bădescu, ilustrații de Suzana Fântânariu, Cluj, Casa Cărții de Știință, 2025, ISBN 9786061726226.
