= List of disasters in Romania by death toll =

The list of disasters in Romania by death toll includes major disasters and accidents – excluding warfare and other intentional acts – that took place on Romanian soil and resulted in at least five fatalities:

Disasters represented below:
Disaster below:
Plague
Earthquakes
Train wrecks
Storms
Floods
Structural fire
Explosions
Plane crashes

== Disasters ==
| Date | Disaster | Type | Death toll | Ref |
|---|---|---|---|---|
| 1813 | Caragea's plague | Epidemic | 90,000 | |
| 2020–2023 | COVID-19 pandemic | Pandemic | 68,728 | |
| 4 March 1977 | Vrancea earthquake | Natural disaster | 1,578 | |
| 14 January 1917 | Ciurea rail disaster | Train wreck | 600 | |
| 10 September 1940 | Vrancea earthquake | Natural disaster | 593 | |
| 21 April 1689 | Brașov fire | Fire | 300 | |
| 10 September 1989 | Sinking of the Mogoșoaia | Ship wreck | 239 | |
| May–June 1970 | Romanian floods | Natural disaster | 209 | |
| 18 April 1930 | Costești wooden church fire | Structural fire | 118 | |
| 30 October 1971 | Certej dam failure | Flood | 89 | |
| January–February 2012 | European cold wave | Cold wave | 86 | |
| 30 April 1922 | 1922 Lupeni mine disaster | Mine explosion | 82 | |
| 11 January 1838 | Vrancea earthquake | Natural disaster | 73 | |
| 30 October 2015 | Colectiv nightclub fire | Structure fire | 64 | |
| 31 March 1995 | TAROM Flight 371 | Plane crash | 60 | |
| 29 June 1980 | Huțani bus accident | Bus crash | 48 | |
| 1 September 1979 | Brașov explosion | Foundry failure | 47 | |
| 3 May 1944 | 1944 Lupeni mine disaster | Mine explosion | 33 | |
| September 1974 | Broșteni bridge truck accident | Mobile accident | 31 | |
| August 2005 | Romanian floods | Flood | 31 | |
| 10 November 1979 | Bucharest drugs factory explosion | Explosion | 27 | |
| 21 August 1988 | Fărăoani truck accident | Truck accident | 27 | |
| June–July 2010 | Romanian floods | Natural disaster | 23 | |
| 24 May 2004 | Mihăilești explosion | Vehicle explosion | 18 | |
| 23 March 1847 | Great Fire of Bucharest | Fire | 15 | |
| 14 August 2009 | Scânteia train accident | Train collision | 14 | |
| 15 November 2008 | Petrila mine disaster | Mine explosion | 13 | |
| 8 September 2013 | Valea Lupului train accident | Train collision | 11 | |
| 30-31 May 1990 | Vrancea earthquakes | Natural disaster | 8 | |
| 17 September 2017 | Timișoara storm | Natural disaster | 8 | |
| 26 December 2023 | Ferma Dacilor fire | Structural fire | 8 | |
| 26 July 2010 | IAF Sikorsky CH-53 crash | Plane crash | 7 | |
| 16 August 2010 | Giulești maternity fire | Structure fire | 6 | |
| 26 August 2023 | Crevedia explosions | Gas explosion | 6 | |
