= Valea Lupului minibus train collision =

2013 train accident in Romania

Iași minibus train collision
- The location of Iași County in Romania

Details
- Date: 8 September 2013; 15:00 (UTC+3)
- Location: near the Antibiotice factory in Valea Lupului, Iași County
- Coordinates: 47.172692°N 27.486527°E
- Country: Romania
- Incident type: Grade crossing collision

Statistics
- Passengers: 11
- Deaths: 11
- Injured: 0

The Iași train accident occurred on September 8, 2013 at 15:00 local time (UTC+3) when 11 people died, including a 14-year-old boy after a collision between a Volkswagen Sharan minibus and a train in Iași County, Romania.

== Accident ==
The train involved in the accident was operated by private rail company Regiotrans and ran from Iași to Dorohoi. The minibus ignored posted signs at the railway crossing, on the communal road leading from Uricani to national road DN28. The driver, a 40-year-old man, did not even make a brake mark before attempting to cross the double railway line. The vehicle was dragged for 600 m (2,000 ft) after being hit by the train. All of the dead were on the minibus, none of the passengers and crew aboard the train were injured or killed. There were no survivors in the minibus. The people in the minibus were farm workers from Glodeni and Domnița, going to help harvest the vineyard of an acquaintance in Breazu.

== Aftermath ==
The railway crossing near the Antibiotice factory in Valea Lupului is one of busiest in the Iași area. The 2013 minibus train collision was one of the worst road-rail accidents in Romania in the preceding ten years, second only to the Scânteia train accident, which resulted in 14 fatalities.

Shortly after, members of the Romanian Parliament from Iași County proposed drastic measures to remedy the situation, such as installing a barrier, a traffic light, and even diverting car traffic. After more than 10 years, nothing has changed; the site is marked with faded and outdated signs and the traffic light is still missing, although traffic is much more intense now. Some drivers make a big sign of the cross before crossing "the place where death lurks."

== See also ==
- Scânteia train accident
- List of road accidents 2010–2019
