= Antibiotice Iași =

Romanian pharmaceutical company

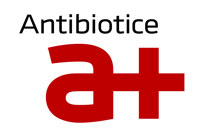
- Type: Public
- Traded as: BVB: ATB
- Industry: pharmaceutical
- Founded: 1955
- Headquarters: Iași, Romania
- Key people: Ioan Nani, CEO
- Revenue: EUR 139.3 million (2024)
- Number of employees: 1,357 (2024)
- Website: antibiotice.ro

Antibiotice Iași is a public pharmaceutical company which is one of the largest drug producing companies in Romania. It is 53.02%-owned by the Romanian Ministry of Health. Its research center and production facilities are based in Valea Lupului, a commune near Iași.

Antibiotice produces 150 medicines for human use from 12 therapeutic areas, veterinary medicines, and active substances (Nystatin). Its products are exported to various countries, including the United Kingdom, United States, Hungary, Lithuania, Iraq, Yemen or Vietnam.
