= Petre P. Carp =

Moldavian political scientist and culture critic (1837–1919)

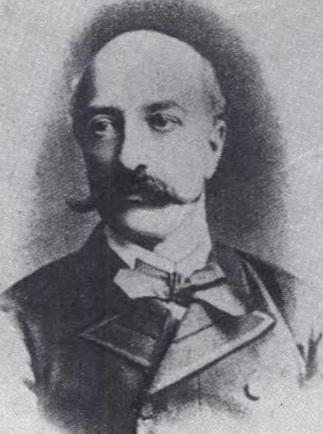
- P. P. Carp (pre-1900 photograph)

21st Prime Minister of Romania
- In office 7 July 1900 – 13 February 1901
- Monarch: Carol I
- Preceded by: Gheorghe Grigore Cantacuzino
- Succeeded by: Dimitrie Sturdza
- In office 29 December 1910 – 28 March 1912
- Monarch: Carol I
- Preceded by: Ion I. C. Brătianu
- Succeeded by: Titu Maiorescu

Minister of Finance
- In office 7 July 1900 – 13 February 1901
- Prime Minister: Himself
- Preceded by: Take Ionescu
- Succeeded by: Gheorghe Pallade
- In office 29 December 1910 – 28 March 1912
- Prime Minister: Himself
- Preceded by: Emil Costinescu
- Succeeded by: Theodor Rosetti

Minister of Foreign Affairs
- In office 20 April 1870 – 14 December 1870
- Prime Minister: Manolache Costache Epureanu
- Preceded by: Alexandru G. Golescu
- Succeeded by: Nicolae Calimachi-Catargiu
- In office 22 March 1888 – 22 March 1889
- Prime Minister: Theodor Rosetti
- Preceded by: Mihail Pherekyde
- Succeeded by: Alexandru N. Lahovari
Additional positions
Member of the Senate of Romania
In office 1877–1916
Member of the Assembly of Deputies
In office 1867–1877
Constituency	Vaslui County
Ambassador of Romania to Vienna
In office 31 October 1882 – 21 September 1884
Minister of Agriculture, Industry, Commerce, and Property
In office 4 June 1888 – 11 November 1888
Prime Minister	Theodor Rosetti
Preceded by	Titu Maiorescu
Succeeded by	Alexandru N. Lahovari
In office 18 December 1891 – 3 October 1895
Prime Minister	Lascăr Catargiu
Preceded by	Gheorghe Manu
Succeeded by	Gheorghe Pallade
Minister of Religious Affairs and Public Instruction
In office 23 May 1870 – 14 December 1870
Prime Minister	Manolache Costache Epureanu
Preceded by	Vasile Pogor
Succeeded by	Nicolae Gr. Racoviță
In office 30 January 1876 – 30 March 1876
Prime Minister	Lascăr Catargiu
Preceded by	Titu Maiorescu
Succeeded by	Alexandru Orăscu

Personal details
- Born: Petre Petrache Carp; 28 or 29 June [O.S. 16 or 17 June] 1837 Iași, Principality of Moldova
- Died: June 19, 1919 (aged 81) Țibănești, Kingdom of Romania
- Party: Junimea; Conservative Party
- Spouse: Sevastia Cantacuzino (m. 1874–1919)
- Occupation: Diplomat, politician

Petre P. Carp (Romanian pronunciation: [ˈpetre pe karp]; also known as Petrache Carp, Francized Pierre Carp, occasionally Comte Carpe; 28 or 29 June [O.S. 16 or 17 June] 1837 – 19 June 1919) was a Romanian statesman, political scientist and culture critic, one of the major representatives of Romanian liberal conservatism, and twice the country's Prime Minister (1900–1901, 1910–1912). His youth was intertwined with the activity of the Junimea club, which he co-founded with critic Titu Maiorescu as a literary society, and then helped transform it into a political club. He left behind a budding career as Junimea's polemicist and cultural journalist, joining the state bureaucracy of the United Principalities, the Romanian diplomatic corps, and ultimately electoral politics. A speaker for aristocratic sentiment and the Romanian gentry, Carp helped create the Conservative Party from the various "White" conservative clubs (1880), but also led a Junimist dissident wing against the Conservative mainstream leaders Lascăr Catargiu and Gheorghe Grigore Cantacuzino. He was a contributor to the Junimea platform Convorbiri Literare, and founder of the newspapers Térra (1868) and Moldova (1915).

Widely seen as unyielding and trenchant in his public stance, and respected as an orator, P. P. Carp stood against the majority current in various political debates. His entire discourse was an alternative to the protectionist, antisemitic and populist tendencies of "Red" Romanian liberalism. Welcoming Westernization and free trade, his vision of development nonetheless rested on gradualism and criticized modern experiments in governance. The two Carp administrations are remembered for their fiscal reforms, their encouragement of foreign investments, and their attempted clampdown on political corruption.

A Germanophile and a Russophobe, Carp gathered consensus for steering the Kingdom of Romania into the Triple Alliance, but his external policy became entirely unpopular by the start of World War I. During that time, he was the only prominent public figure to demand a declaration of war against the Entente Powers. He came out of retirement during the German occupation of Romania, when he inspired fellow Conservative Lupu Kostaki to set up a collaborationist territorial government. This final project caused his fall into disgrace once the legitimate government regained control.

== Biography ==
=== Early life and education ===
Carp was a scion of the old boyar class in Moldavia: his family has attested roots going back to the 17th century, and believed by some to have originated in the Baltic region. The Carps were related to other noble houses, including the Cozadinis, the Racovițăs and the Kostakis. They owned the manorial estate of Țibănești, formed over the centuries by the accumulation of yeomen farmland and still a lucrative business in their lifetime. Carp's father, also known as Petre (Petru), was a Spatharios of the Princely Court, then Stolnic. Educated abroad during the earliest wave of Westernization, fascinated by Enlightenment ideals and the Carboneria, he took part in political agitation before the Moldavian Revolution of 1848. His wife, Petre P. Carp's mother, was Smaranda Radul, from the boyar branch of Dealu Mare. The couple had another son, who died at birth.

The future Conservative leader was born in the Moldavian capital of Iași. When he was still a young child, his father took him on his first trip out of Moldavia: they traveled by stagecoach through the Austrian Empire, and then to Prussia. In Berlin, Petre Jr enlisted at the bilingual Französisches Gymnasium, and lived in the house of its Huguenot headmaster, L'Hardy. Young Carp received a classical education in literature, and was noted as a connoisseur of works by Homer, J. W. Goethe, and especially William Shakespeare. He took his Matura with the highest grade of his class, and then studied Law and Politics at the University of Bonn. Carp affiliated with a notorious student fraternity, the Corps Borussia. According to literary historian Tudor Vianu, this aristocratic influence Germanized his views and his public persona, from "the slightly aggressive ego" and the passion for dueling to the wearing of a monocle. It was in Bonn that Carp made his debut as an orator. On behalf of the student fraternities, Carp welcomed Jérôme, cousin of French Emperor Napoleon III, and was remarked by the visitor for his "clear" and intellectually honest political stance. Carp's future colleague, Moldavian Iacob Negruzzi, also briefly met him as a student, and first noticed in him the potential statesman.

=== Junimea creation ===
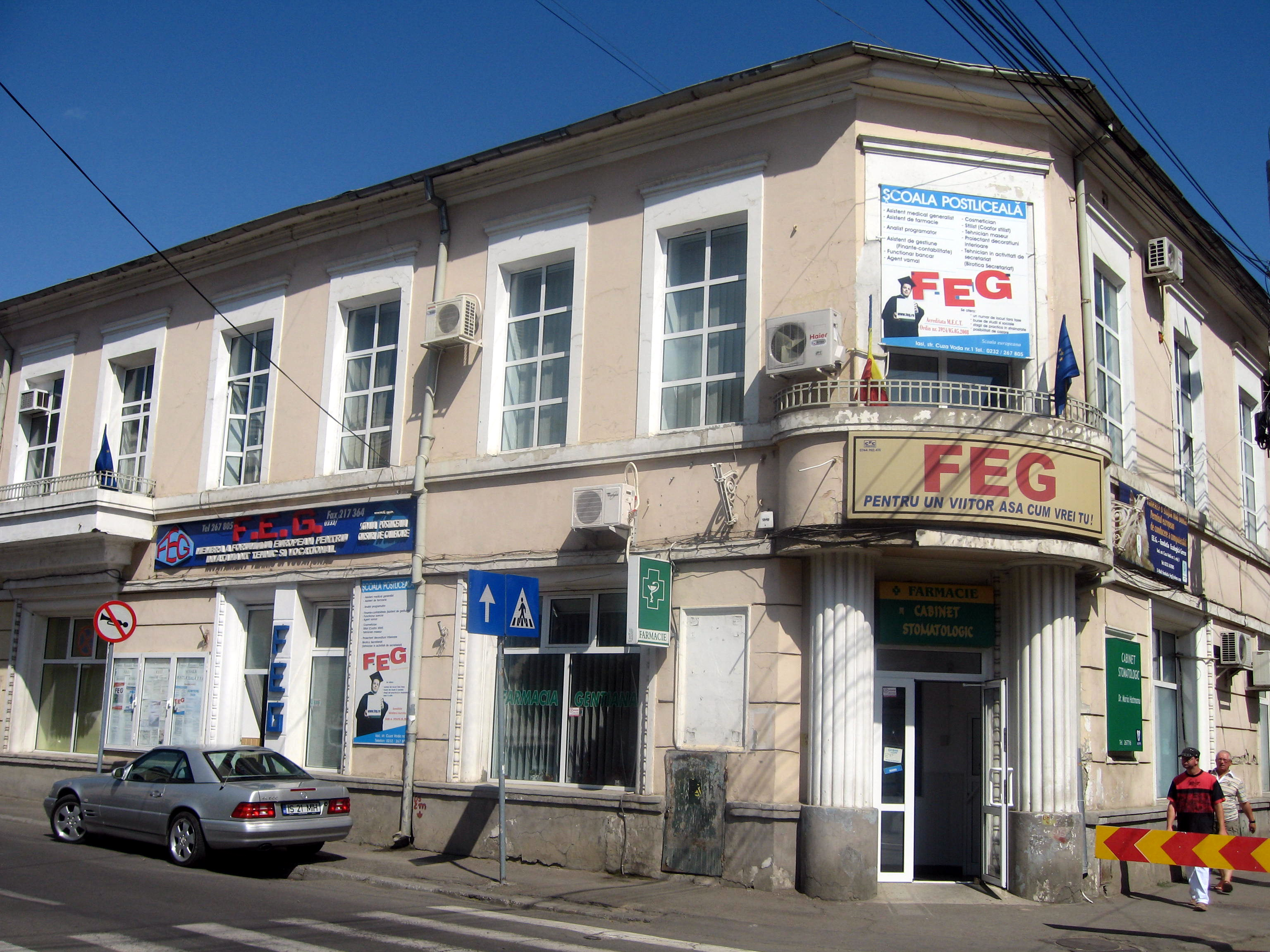
The building once housing Junimea's printing press

Carp was in Prussia when Moldavia merged with Wallachia to create the United Principalities (the first step to a unified Romania). He returned to Iași in autumn 1862, having just turned 25, and soon after dedicated himself to reanimating the city's intellectual scene. Carp embarked on a long friendship with the like-minded Titu Maiorescu. They shared an appreciation of Prussia and a German education, but joined hands with the Francophile Vasile Pogor; the three of them set up Junimea, originally a literary club with only some political ambitions. Lawyer Theodor Rosetti, considered the fourth founder, joined in 1863, followed in 1864 by Negruzzi. Although the society was always dominated by Francophiles, Carp and Maiorescu together exercised such authority that the Germanophile platform was never challenged from within.

From its inception, the Junimea group supported dialogue over class divides. Theodor Rosetti's family, the Rosettis, were a famous political clan, and he was himself the brother-in-law of united Romania's first ruler, Domnitor Alexander John Cuza (wedded to Elena Rosetti). As philosopher Virgil Nemoianu notes, Rosetti and Carp were the highest-ranked boyars among the Junimist founders. Maiorescu was the only core member not to come from a wealthy family, and privately resented his aristocratic colleagues, Carp included, for their condescending behavior. However, Carp also used his nobleman's upbringing to Maiorescu's advantage, when he promised to duel all those who would mention Maiorescu's alleged sexual misconduct.

P. P. Carp's initial contribution to Junimist activities was as a man of letters. In a public reading at Maiorescu's home, the first such event in Junimea history, he introduced his own translation from Shakespeare's Macbeth, probably done from the English. He kept a vivid interest in such work over the next years, translating Othello (printed under Junimea patronage in 1868), articles from the British cultural press, and the scientific travelogues of Alexander von Humboldt. He also lectured freely on literary or historical subjects, including "Ancient and Modern Tragedy" or "Three Caesars".

The literary reunions attracted interest and became noisy banquets, the atmosphere of which is documented by Negruzzi's memoirs. He notes that Carp hardly ever consumed alcohol in public, but that, when he did, he was a sentimental drunk. The Junimea debates were lively and sprinkled with biting ad hominem. Young Carp casually addressed the audience with the insult gogomani ("dopes"), and it became a badge of pride for the oldest Junimists to have been identified as such. The inside joke was replicated among the more minor Junimists. They casually misspelled Carp's surname as Chirp (pretending to follow the obscure lexical theories of folklorist Ioan D. Caragiani); also, during one Junimea party, novelist Nicolae Gane staged a puppet show in which Carp and Maiorescu were the main characters.

=== 1866 conspiracy and mission to France ===
By 1865, Carp had all but abandoned the cultivation of literature, throwing his hat into politics: following Th. Rosetti's intercession, he became an auditor for Cuza's Council of State, leaving for Bucharest. The interval corresponded with the emergence of major political currents, formed around the two halves of a pro-Cuza "National Party": the "Red" camp, as an early manifestation of Romanian liberalism; the "Whites", as mainly proponents of traditional conservatism. More attracted to the "White" half of the spectrum, Carp became especially active in the national journals (Cugetarea, Revista Dunării), mainly as a critic of Romania's "Red" liberalism and of some emergent left-wing tendencies.

This was the time of Carp's first-ever polemic with the historian and "Red" ideologue Bogdan Petriceicu Hasdeu. Carp's 1865 piece, published in the local paper Cugetarea under the pen name P. Bătăușul ("P. the Bully"), attacked Hasdeu's biography of the medieval despot Ion Vodă cel Cumplit, and specifically its advocacy of absolute monarchy and populism. A year later, Carp was lending his pen to the Junimist satire of Hasdeu's historical method. In 1867, he also gave an exceptionally harsh review to Hasdeu's historical play, Răzvan și Vidra, and attacked his historical research in the "White" review Gazeta de Iassi.

As a defender of the parliamentary system, Carp disliked the authoritarian regime slowly introduced by the Domnitor. He and Pogor were the two anti-Cuzists of Junimea, whereas the other contributors remained neutral on the issue. In February 1866, Carp joined the political conspiracy which forced Alexander John Cuza into exile. Romania's Regents (the Princely Lieutenancy) appointed him their Intimate Secretary. He was also kept on as auditor pro bono. Carp soon rallied with the supporters of rule by a foreign dynasty, and, in Desbaterile gazette, advocated the dissolution of Parliament in preparation for the April plebiscite. When the list of candidates was narrowed down to Carol (Karl) of Hohenzollern-Sigmaringen, Premier Ion Ghica sent Carp on his first diplomatic assignment, a secret mission to Napoleon III—Carp was to inquire about possible French objections to the enthronement of this Prussian prince, and recorded the Emperor's mild approval. Ghica and Carp, who were trying to contain a wave of separatist and anti-Prussian movements at home, registered a moral victory (made possible by the assistance of socialite Hortense Cornu, a personal friend of Napoleon's).

On May 11, 1866, that is a day after Carol was made Domnitor, Carp became Secretary of Romania's Legation to the French Empire, serving under Ion Bălăceanu, and replacing Bălăceanu from May 1867. He gave much importance to personal diplomacy, and regularly attended social functions at the Court of Compiègne. In the end he resigned over a disagreement with Ștefan Golescu, Romania's Minister of Foreign Affairs, concerning the conspiratorial activities of refugees from Ottoman Bulgaria. Specifically, Golescu had ordered him to lie about Romanian support for the Bulgarian Revolutionary Central Committee.

=== "White" spokesman and Epureanu's minister ===
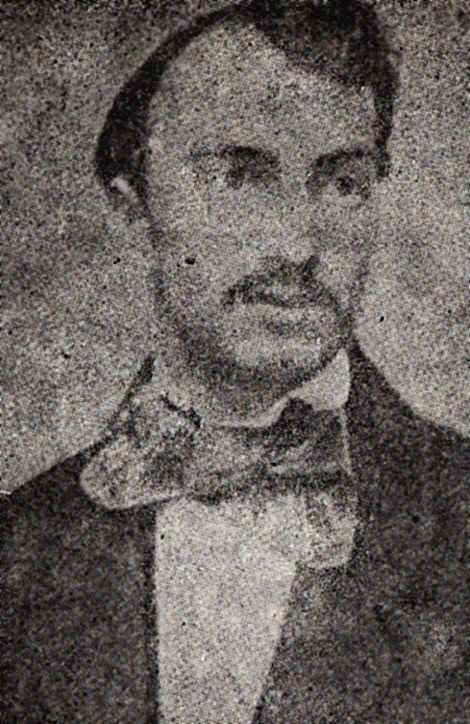
Photograph of Carp, ca. 1870

Carp returned to Moldavia in autumn, and ran in elections for the Assembly of Deputies constituency of Vaslui (1st College). He carried the vote, and, joining the conservative ("White") section of Parliament, and proceeded to reorganize the conservative movement. Carp found the new regime, as inaugurated by the Constitution of 1866, to be a good foundation stone: preserving the Constitution became a main priority of the "Whites". This period also marked Carp's first contacts with the conservative wing of Freemasonry, and, in 1868, he was initiated into the "Star of Romania" Masonic Lodge.

After accepting the Constitution, Carp stood against the political majority in what concerned the Romanian nationality law. This explicitly proscribed non-Christians, primarily Romanian Jews, from ever becoming full citizens. On May 29, 1867, Carp joined some conservatives and centrist liberals who petitioned Carol, asking him to stop the "Reds" from expelling Moldavian Jews. Carp was equally alarmed about the Russian Empire's policy toward Romania, which he regarded as callous and menacing, and believed that members of some other ethnic communities needed to be kept under watch. He therefore officially demanded a probe into the pro-Russian politics of Bulgarian committees.

In November 1867, Carp joined Nicolae Moret Blaremberg and Aristide Pascal as co-editor of the daily Térra (an antiquated spelling of Țara, "The Country"). It was introduced as a D̦iar politic, literar și comercial ("Political, Literary and Commercial Paper"), and published a French-language supplement, Le Pays Roumain. Térra reacted against the "demagogy" of "Red" politics, in particular the opinions expressed by C. A. Rosetti's Românul paper, and advocated Jewish emancipation within a moderate conservative framework. Its content made it a tribune for a distinct group of conservatives: the so-called Juna Dreaptă ("Young Right") society, headed by Manolache Costache Epureanu, and later associated in the public mind with Carp himself. Its vision was reflected in Carp's parliamentary speeches. In April 1868, he condemned the pogrom of Bacău, and described emancipation as an issue of human rights.

Térra closed down in May 1868, and reemerged for a second and last edition between January and July 1870. At that stage, it had allied itself with the monarchist wing of "Red" liberalism, in power with Prime Minister Alexandru G. Golescu. The newspaper gave favorable coverage to the adoption of a national currency, the Romanian leu. This step signaled Romania's unilateral emancipation from the Ottoman Empire, her nominal overlord, but was received with alarm by leftists such as Hasdeu—while Térra called it "grand" news, Hasdeu's pamphlet regarded the leu as the newest symbol of Carlist usurpation. Meanwhile, the Western world was becoming outraged about discrimination and antisemitism in Romania. The nationality law was strongly supported by the liberal left, and, trying to appease the foreign governments, Domnitor Carol ceased all collaboration with the "Reds".

In April 1870, the 33-year-old Junimist joined the Epureanu conservative cabinet (or "Hen and Fledgling Government"), as Minister of Foreign Affairs. From May 23, 1870, Carp also replaced his colleague Pogor as Minister of Education and Religious Affairs. As such, he reinstated Maiorescu to his teaching position at the University of Iași, helping him recover from a damaging confrontation with the liberal teaching staff. Carp still made occasional contributions to the Junimist literary press and, the same year, published a review of Gheorghe Sion's collection of fables in Maiorescu's Convorbiri Literare, but the various assignments absorbed Junimea men into state affairs. Iacob Negruzzi, who initially complained ("That's how politics more or less tears apart our literary club. A shame in God's eyes!"), was soon co-opted into political life, leaving for Bucharest in mid-1870.

The major challenge of Carp's term as Foreign Minister was the Franco-Prussian War. It placed Romania in a delicate situation, while exacerbating the internal tensions between "Red" Francophiles and "White" Germanophiles. Carp's ministry also faced a regional crisis when the Imperial Russian Army was mobilized on the Prut River and the Russian government pressured Romania to accept military tutelage; he resisted the Russian demands, even against the liberals' appeal to Eastern Orthodox brotherhood, and expressed more support for France than for Russia.

=== Catargiu's "Great government" ===
Eventually, Epureanu saw himself confronted with the "Republic of Ploiești" conspiracy. This was the start of a major republican unrest, sparked by those "Reds" who wanted to stop the penetration of foreign capital. The republican movement was spurred on by the "Strousberg Affair", when the scale of (supposedly privileged) Prussian involvement in the Romanian Railways was revealed to a Francophile public. The incidents were covered by Térra, but Carp and his colleagues insisted that, far from being a disgrace for the "Whites", the scandalous bailout had been agreed between "Red" minister Mihail Kogălniceanu and Prussian investor B. H. Strousberg. Carp resented the republicans, and noted that the riots were an opportunity for Carol to arrest the entire "Red" leadership. Epureanu's government fell in December 1870, but the "Whites" returned to power in March 1871, with Lascăr Catargiu at the helm. This period, known to the conservatives as the "Great government", managed to bring together all "White" factions. The quinquennial political crisis, that had almost prompted Carol to present his resignation, ended with that, and Romania experienced social development.

Carp was appointed Head of Mission to the newly proclaimed German Empire, where he served until April 1873 and negotiated further German credits for the Railways. It was in part a mission of appeasement: Carp persuaded German Chancellor Otto von Bismarck not to switch to the "enemies of Romania" side, playing down the riots as a short-lived liberal nuisance (the "Strousberg Affair" was only solved in 1880, when the Romanian state purchased the German stock). Following this venture, Carp was also dispatched to the Kingdom of Italy, as Romanian diplomatic agent.

In November 1873, Carp ended his assignment and returned to the Romanian political scene. He soon after married to a fellow aristocrat, Sevastia Cantacuzino. Hailing from Cantacuzino boyars, she was the daughter of Ion C. Cantacuzino (who was Carp's political ally). Her mother was Maria Mavros, a direct descendant of the Soutzos clan. Sevastia would have five children from Carp: daughter Elisabeta (Elsa), sons Jean (Ion), Grigore, Petre and Nicu. Meanwhile, the Junimist club, answering a proposal made by Gheorghe Costa-Foru, had agreed to caucus with Catargiu's conservatives. The Catargiu cabinet had Maiorescu as Minister of Education and Religious Affairs, but the latter resigned due to a political scandal. Carp was called in to replace his Junimea colleague, and filled the post for the remaining two months of conservative power.

In 1874, P. P. Carp was formally recognized as the political head of Junimea, drafting the group's gradualist and constitutional-monarchist program. He also stood by the Catargiu government after it had signed the controversial trade convention with Austria-Hungary: according to Carp, the agreement implicitly recognized Romania's right to trade, and effectively ended her subordination to the Ottoman Empire. The "Red" liberals and former "Whites" such as Epureanu set up the National Liberal Party (PNL), which managed to topple the conservative cabinet. Upon losing his ministerial office, Carp commented that the alternation in power and the two-party system were necessary improvements: "it is good for a party not to hold on to power for too long, and I believe that, in fact, from time to time, it is good for one party to step down and leave room for the other." When the PNL organized a retaliatory investigation of "White" management, Carp was one of only three former ministers against whom no accusation could be formulated.

=== Romanian independence and Northern Dobruja debate ===
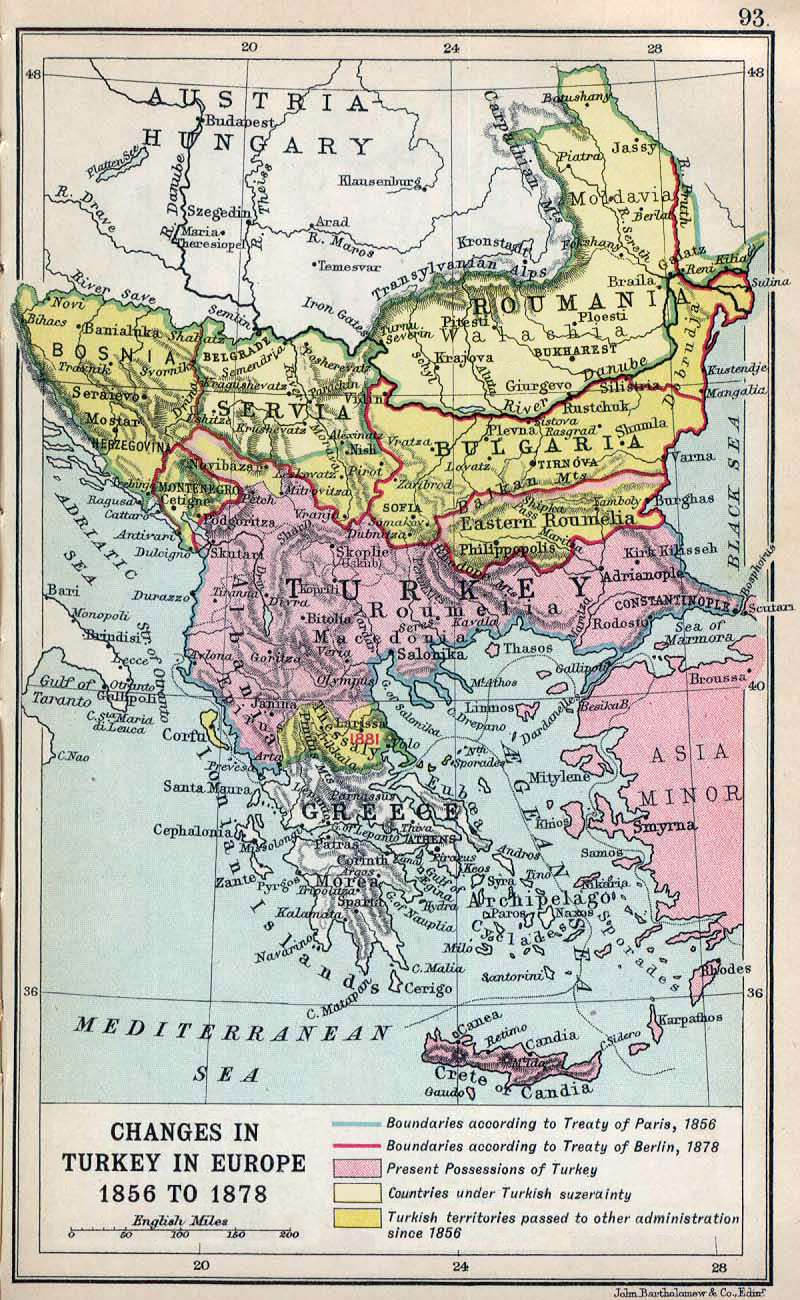
Map of the Balkans in 1878, showing emancipated territories (yellow) and new borders (red) over the old ones (green)

After partial elections for Vaslui's 2nd College (April 1877), Carp took a Senate seat. He watched with concern as the PNL drew Romania closer to Russia, and as Russia prepared to confront the Ottoman Empire. The Ottomans refused to guarantee Romanian neutrality in the case of war, and Foreign Minister Mihail Kogălniceanu began meeting with the Russian envoys; Carp regretted Ottoman indifference, stating: "abandoned by all, we have been pushed into the arms of Russia". He also asked, rhetorically, "what is our guarantee against Russia?" Just before the Russo-Turkish War of 1877, he criticized Premier Ion Brătianu for allowing safe passage to Russian troops. His argument was that the intrusion of "30,000 foreign bayonets" posed a great threat for Romania's future. Still a skeptic, Carp welcomed his country's independence war on the Ottomans, but continued to warn his peers about any unwanted effects of the Russian alliance.

During the Peace Congress of Berlin, Carp was especially alarmed by the territorial exchanges: Romania lost the Budjak region to Russia and, in addition to international recognition, received Northern Dobruja (formerly in the Ottoman Danube Vilayet). Domnitor Carol and the Brătianu government reluctantly approved this deal, but a parliamentary faction, comprising Carp and PNL's Dimitrie Sturdza, explicitly condemned it. Their resolution stipulated that annexing Northern Dobruja was against the national interest; the opposition saw Northern Dobruja as a marshy, toxic, territory, and worried that it was largely inhabited by Muslims or disgruntled Bulgarians. Carp personally worried that the region was indefensible in front of Bulgarian irredentism. Eventually, on September 28, 1878, after a lengthy debate in Parliament and a convincing speech by Foreign Minister Kogălniceanu, the vote swung and the territorial exchange was given official endorsement. The government insisted that the incorporation was not a pittance or spoils of war, but the recovery of ancient Wallachian territory.

Carp watched in disbelief as the PNL's hold on power, by far the longest of its era, sent the "Whites" into a crisis. As a loyalist, he reacted strongly against Catargiu and other conservative leaders when their Timpul newspaper began attacking Carol over his partnership with the National Liberals, and demanded ideological purity. He was returned to the Assembly in the May 1879 race, again elected in Vaslui's 1st College.

As the territorial acquisitions and criticism from some Western observers were returning to the public agenda the issue of naturalization for non-Christians, Carp again spoke out in support of the Romanian Jews. The citizenship rights had by then been extended, under Western pressure, to accommodate Northern Dobrujan Muslims, but the Jews were still excluded in practice. A year before, Carp had published in Convorbiri Literare a review of the epic poem Radu, written by the Jewish intellectual Ronetti Roman.

=== Era Nouă politics and Kingdom creation ===
From 1880, Carp was primarily based in Bucharest, owning a townhouse in Dorobanți area. The year brought a victory for the Junimists: as a challenge to the PNL's grip on power, they consolidated the "White" movement from within, and set up the Conservative Party. Carp, its main doctrinaire, outlined its governing principles and its pledges in the celebrated speech Era Nouă ("The New Era"). It was a defense of landed property in front of PNL promises of land reform, of self-governance and the strict separation of powers in front of centralism, and of corporatism in front of industrialization. Keeping up with his mistrust of Russia, Carp was also the first to suggest building fortifications between Focșani and Nămoloasa.

Although he personally drafted such policy proposals, Carp refused to actually join the Conservative Party, and for long remained its non-partisan ally. Like other Junimea men, he denounced Catargiu as a figure from the past, and noted that the party's other program was exceptionally vague and "anodyne". In contrast to the PNL's reinvention into an articulate and unitary structure, the Conservative Party was still a loose association of clubs, called "cadre party" by political scientist Silvia Bocancea. Carp alternated his belonging to such societies with a membership in non-explicitly political venues, such as the Bucharest Jockey Club and Carol's own Regal Club.

In 1881, the Junimists and the National Liberals agreed on the next stage of nation-building, proclaiming the Kingdom of Romania, with Carol I as King. The Carp program was not popular with the mainstream, or "Old", Conservatives, and, in 1882, the Party split. In particular, Carp and the Junimists were outraged that, prioritizing differences of opinion, Catargiu and his followers had refused to contribute their share in creating the 1881 Kingdom. Another point of contention was Catargiu's refusal to endorse one of Carp's cherished projects: Romania's adherence to the Triple Alliance, alongside the German Empire, Austria-Hungary and Italy. This perspective on foreign politics reunited Carp with King Carol and Ion Brătianu, who secretly convened that, after the taking of the Budjak, Romania needed to find herself in an anti-Russian defensive alliance.

=== Joining the Triple Alliance ===
Before the end of 1882, Junimea constituted itself into an independent group and was courted by the other political poles. In that context, Carp became Ambassador to the Austrian Court, appointed by the Brătianu cabinet. He mistrusted the Premier's sincerity, but argued: "he cannot back out, everything is directed against Russia and for sure things are going to stay put for two or three years." His diplomatic skill was invoked in settling a major litigious issue, that of free navigation on the Danube. Brătianu hoped that Carp could persuade the German side in the Danube Commission to vote against the Austrians, allowing Romania to fully control its territorial waters. Carp accomplished his task with unexpected ease.

His main contribution was Romania's alignment with the Triple Alliance, negotiated by him in meetings with Bismarck. He was immersed in this project, as noted by historian Rudolf Dinu: "[his] activity in certain moments exceeded by far the level of a mere negotiator". Brătianu personally thanked his envoy soon after the deal was sealed: "only now can we say that [Romania] has her future ensured." Celebrated by those who opposed Russia, the treaty was for long kept a secret. Besides the Premier, Carp, and Maiorescu, only eight other politicians and none of the succeeding Ambassadors to Austria were informed of Brătianu's action, down to 1914. Although the Triple Alliance regrouped Romania and Austria-Hungary, Carp opposed the Austrians for discriminating against Romania on the issue of navigation, and resented their attempts to direct Germany's foreign policies.

The détente left open another issue on the nation's agenda: the Austro-Hungarian regions of Transylvania, where a Romanian majority was threatened with Magyarization, and Bukovina, with a Romanian plurality. The negotiation effort and even normal diplomatic contacts were jeopardized when the PNL's Petre Grădișteanu attended a large irredentist rally in Iași. When the PNL rank and file threatened with a republican revolt, Carp issued a scornful reply. The Transylvanian problem also expanded the gap between the various Conservatives. The favorite Junimist poet Mihai Eminescu, at the time the main staff writer at Timpul, was noted for his anti-Austrian or anti-Hungarian invectives, and becoming an embarrassment to his patrons. Reportedly, Carp disliked Timpul's tone, telling Maiorescu to "make sure and calm down that Eminescu". Eminescu's quick sinking into a mental disorder put an end to such concerns, but the apparent string of coincidences continues to fuel a conspiracy theory, according to which Carp and Maiorescu have framed and silenced Eminescu.

=== "Tomorrow's Conservatives" and "United Opposition" ===
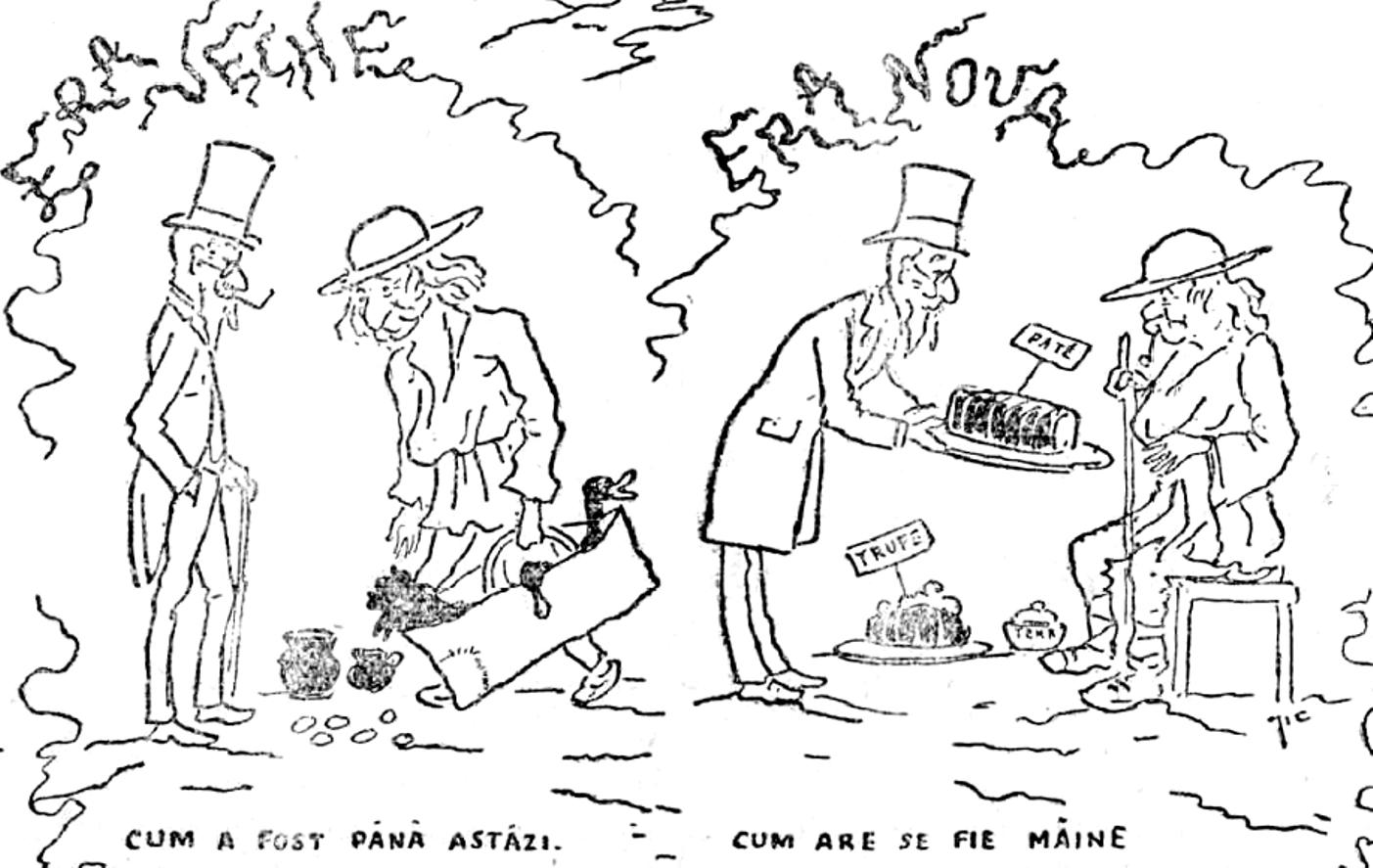
A Constantin Jiquidi cartoon, poking fun at Carp's Era Nouă government (November 1888). In the "old era", peasants feed their masters; in Carp's "new era", the roles are politely alternated

The Junimist group, also calling itself the "New Conservatives" or "Tomorrow's Conservatives", adopted an extended version of the Era Nouă program as its very own (1884). They were again in disagreement with the PNL, once Brătianu pushed through legislation that expanded the electoral basis and renounced the old census suffrage. At the time, the whole Junimist party found itself exposed to criticism from all sides, which Carp countered with his trademark sarcastic speeches. The dialogue between the two sides did not stop, and, in the 1884 election, young Junimist Alexandru Marghiloman was elected to the legislature with support from both P. P. Carp and Ion Brătianu.

The "New Conservatives" eventually caucused with the Conservative Party, and effectively formed a single group in Parliament (more evidently so when Carp was out of the country). Carp and the others were however revolted when Catargiu joined George D. Vernescu, the PNL dissident, in creating the Conservative-Liberal Party, its existence enshrined in popular memory as Struțo-cămila ("The Ostrich-Camel"). At around that time, Carp was witness to a duel of pistols between Maiorescu and the PNL politico Eugeniu Stătescu, which ended without bloodshed.

During the troubled 1887–1888 period, when Catargiu and other opposition Conservatives left Parliament to push for the fall of Brătianu's cabinet, Carp's group stayed behind, and pursued dialogue with those in power. For a while, Junimea was the parliamentary opposition, while the "United Opposition" of Catargiu took its battle to the streets. The general public began to suspect that the PNL leader was backing the unpopular alliance with Germany, and Bismarck himself expressed concern that a neutralist policy would overturn Carp's program.

The United Opposition staged a riot against the PNL in March 1888. Carp was shocked by the violent backlash, and, although he did not sign up to a common platform, joined the peaceful March of Mourning into the Assembly Palace. Carp thus witnessed the unresolved shooting incident, during which an Assembly usher was shot dead. It has been reported that Carp verbally assaulted PNL minister Dimitrie Sturdza, grabbing him by the collar and pointing to the dead body: "You rascal, these are your deeds!" When government briefly arrested two United Opposition agitators, the PNL man Nicolae Fleva and the junior Conservative Nicolae Filipescu, Carp denounced a cover-up attempt: "If impertinence were enough to hide a murder, the government would be clean as snow; if numbers were enough to guarantee impunity, you'd go unpunished."

Eventually, King Carol appointed Th. Rosetti to lead a Junimist cabinet. The sovereign's own notes explain that he deeply mistrusted the United Opposition, and only called on "people devoted to me, who have always acted in the appropriate manner: Rosetti [...], Carp and Maiorescu" (alongside his own Adjutant Constantin Barozzi, appointed War Minister). The news generated even more trouble, as the outgoing PNL administration had made vague promises of a land reform in the Bărăgan Plain. Locals were disheartened that a landowning party had been granted power, and rebelled. Carol felt threatened by the events, urging the troops to show "no mercy" when quashing the revolt, and blaming them on a Russian-style "Narodovolist" conspiracy. In this context, Carp proceeded to negotiate with the United Opposition, offering to make Fleva head of Internal Affairs, in preparation for the November 1888 election. The plan failed, as Fleva asked for a totally free scrutiny, to which Carp allegedly replied: "No free elections! But we'll get real elections!"

=== Rosetti cabinet and "Conservative concentration" ===
Although Carp still had the political initiative, he was not considered for the premiership. Instead, he was Minister of Foreign Affairs and (until November 11, 1888) ad interim Minister of Agriculture, Industry and Royal Domains. His term is remembered for the creation of the original national wire service, the Romanian Telegraph Agency, and for toning down tensions with Germany. The Conservatives and Junimists were again sharing power, the latter having convinced the former to stand by the Era Nouă promises. However, the "Old Conservatives" preserved a grudge, and maneuvered against their Junimist partners, provoking Rosetti's fall from power.

From 1889, the Junimists and their sympathizers established a "Constitutional Club" in Parliament; in 1891, Junimea itself became the Constitutional Party. Its main figures were Carp, Maiorescu, Th. Rosetti, Negruzzi and Marghiloman. Soon, the Era Nouă slogan was also taken up by a Junimist weekly, co-edited by Petru Th. Missir, A. C. Cuza and N. Volenti, effectively a Constitutionalist paper.

Despite the schism being formalized in this manner, the Constitutional group, with its weak electoral basis, was closely allied to the mainstream Conservatives, and participated the "Conservative concentration" governments of 1891–1896. There were still significant tensions between the various Conservatives as the factions alternated in government. In 1889, Premier Gheorghe Manu, objecting to the "Junimification" of his cadres, explicitly denied him entry into his cabinet, but Carp still applauded its "modern" policies from the side. Although related to Sevastia Carp, Manu reportedly hated his Conservative colleague, probably because of their unequal boyar status. Carp was similarly marginalized during the fourth and final Catargiu administration (1891), but still described it as "one of the most fertile and useful" Romanian governments.

From November 1891, Catargiu assigned him the portfolio of Agriculture and Industry, where he replaced Manu. In this capacity, he passed the 1895 Law on Mining, which created the opportunities for industrial growth at a national level. His other contributions were a new Law on Forestry, the construction of several "Model Farms", education campaigns to improve animal husbandry, and the canalization of Sulina branch (Danube Delta).

Lacking popular appeal, Carp was interested in a rapprochement with Catargiu, and, as a gesture of good-will, stripped the old Junimist and republican George Panu of his Constitutional Party membership. He continued to advise caution on the issue of Transylvanian irredenta, rekindled by the Transylvanian Memorandum scandal. He and the other Conservative front men publicly supported Aurel Popovici, the Transylvanian activist who espoused Habsburg loyalism (even though, in private, Carp described Popovici's effort as unrealistic). Popovici too became Carp's enthusiastic follower among the Transylvanians, counting him and Maiorescu as his personal idols.

Carp eventually incited the Conservative coalition to concede power. In an interview with his sympathizer Missir, he informed the suspicious public that, far from being a ruse, the move evidenced his party's "moral duty", that of not holding on to power against all odds. In 1898, Carp's daughter married Alexandru D. Sturdza, son of the PNL's Dimitrie Sturdza, who was by then the acting Premier. Despite their 1888 quarrel and their positioning on different sides of the political divide (which added journalistic interest to the wedding), Carp and Premier Sturdza were both dedicated Germanophiles. As a result of a government arrangement, Alexandru spent the next 12 years in Germany, where he trained with the Imperial Army.

=== First Carp cabinet ===
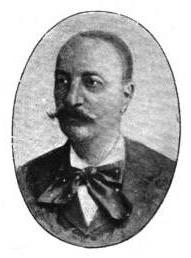
Carp's official photograph, ca. 1900

By 1899, Junimea was again merged into the Conservative Party. That year, Catargiu died, leaving open the issue of his succession to the Conservative Chairmanship. Carp took part in the subsequent race, but lost to Gheorghe Grigore Cantacuzino, who probably received decisive support from King Carol. During the election, Carp found himself a new adversary, in the person of Take Ionescu. This highly popular and young Conservative, who preserved strong links with the PNL, helped swing the vote in favor of Cantacuzino. Carp sincerely believed that Ionescu was a problem for the Conservative Party, and stated that his major goal was proving to the world that Ionescu was not a genuine politician. He was especially vexed by Ionescu's indifference to an unwritten law, according to which the King had an ultimate say in foreign policies. Carp's influence was also being contested by the new current formed around the Conservative Study Circle. Through its speakers Filipescu and Dimitrie S. Nenițescu, the Circle began analyzing the need for complex electoral reforms. Filipescu admired the senior leader, but Carp felt that the generation gap was unbridgeable.

P. P. Carp was Romanian Premier and Finance Minister between July 7, 1900 and February 13, 1901. Although rumors were spreading that Jewish emancipation was to be enacted by his cabinet, he was more focused on tackling the economic slump. The dire economic situation had already brought down a Conservative cabinet, in which Take Ionescu was the Finance Minister.

Unable to contract more foreign loans, Carp opened the country's oil industry and forestry to foreign investments, and introduced budget cuts in local administration. As a leading measure, the Premier attempted to relinquish the state's share in the National Bank of Romania (BNR). The project was opposed by BNR founder and National Liberal doyen Eugeniu Carada, who informed Carp that there was little chance of profitable privatization. BNR Governor Mihail C. Sutzu also resisted the move—the other shareholders ultimately agreed to purchase government stock, and to provide future loans for the state. As an alternative measure, Carp leased the state tobacco monopoly to a bankers' syndicate. In Education, Minister Constantin C. Arion imposed a norm against the accumulation of offices in the academic system, a measure largely directed at PNL-ist staff. Through his Minister of Internal Affairs (Constantin Olănescu), Carp also imposed strict measures against moonshiners, after which riots and bloodshed occurred throughout the poorer regions of Wallachia.

The Carp cabinet had Maiorescu as Justice Minister, and witnessed the first political disagreements between the two friends. Maiorescu was becoming convinced that Carp's ambitions could prove dangerous for their party, and privately complained that his friend still prioritized familial obligations over the business of state. The King too worried that the Junimist budgetary policy was a failure, and Carp, announcing that he was retreating to a private life in the country, handed in his resignation. Although the monarch rejected it, Parliament passed a motion of no confidence. Backed by the German Ambassador Alfred von Kiderlen-Waechter, who welcomed its free trade agenda, the cabinet received much German encouragement before Carp's awkward management of the crisis shook Kiderlen's confidence.

Carp's Liberal in-law Dimitrie Sturdza ascended to power, and, after the 1901 election, the PNL-dominated legislature preserved austerity but attracted in a large loan from the BNR. The budget reflected Carada's belief in self-reliance, to the detriment of Carp's international openness. Arch-rival Cantacuzino jubilated. His tribune (Steaua Olteniei) referred to the Junimists as the "empty-headed old youth", whose politics were "jokes and jibes". Carp also registered a personal defeat when he resigned from the Jockey Club, which had rejected the application of his young protégé Constantin Alimănișteanu.

There followed a period of readjustment inside the Junimea society. After leaving office, Carp enjoyed close ties with a former Junimist figure, the dramatist and satirist Ion Luca Caragiale. The writer had been a mild critic of Carp throughout the 1890s. Around 1905, after Caragiale settled in Germany with his family, he vacationed with Carp in Weimar. Meanwhile, Duiliu Zamfirescu, another literary Junimist, found himself disregarded by his mentors Carp and Maiorescu, and eventually split with the Conservative mainstream.

=== Conservative leadership and 1908 schism ===
From 1904 to 1907, Romania was governed by G. Cantacuzino, whose administration was closed to all Junimists. In the background, the P. P. Carp–Take Ionescu debate, popularly known as "Take v. Petrache", was growing into a clash of doctrines. Ionescu's effort to make himself liked by King Carol, with the intention of toppling Chairman Cantacuzino, contributed to the inauguration of Romania's National Exhibit of 1906. The Junimea bloc, who supported Carp for that same position, boycotted the event, and Ionescu soon discovered that the monarch disliked him even more than he resented Carp. In early 1907, negotiations between Carp and Cantacuzino came to nothing: to the displeasure of Maiorescu, Carp refused to integrate his Junimists unless promised the leadership of Internal Affairs.

Soon after, the Conservative government was rocked by a nationwide peasants' revolt. Cantacuzino hastily reconciled himself with Carp and Maiorescu, attempting to consolidate his parliamentary support in times of trouble. The same year, Carp was elected Chairman of the reunified party. When it came to handling the disturbances, Carp summarized the Conservative position for the government's benefit: "First you repress, then we'll advise." A letter of his, published in Austria-Hungary by the Pester Lloyd, even demanded foreign intervention against the rebels, and left Carp exposed to much criticism from within Romania's Parliament. A while after, Carp may have been a witness as Carol, overstepping his attributes, hoarded away from public scrutiny all documents which recorded the death toll caused by repression. Again noted for his reaction against antisemitism, Carp also demanded, and obtained, the desegregation of farmers' unions, allowing representation to the Jewish leaseholders.

Despite their reconciliation, the Conservatives fared badly in the 1907 election, only receiving 29% of the vote, or 5,729 electors. In 1908, Ion I. C. Brătianu took over the Premiership for the PNL. Carp was an adversary of Brătianu the younger, but had a sympathy for his wife Eliza, a self-confessed admirer of Carp. Also in 1908, Take Ionescu and his supporters established their own Conservative-Democratic Party, which was immediately felt as a major coup by the Carp loyalists. The Conservative-Democratic gazette Democrația rejoiced, claiming that, other than Carp's "anemic" followers, "the entire Conservative Party rallies, with greatest enthusiasm, to the call of Mr. Take Ionescu". Caragiale, much upset by the Conservative policies on the peasant revolt, joined Ionescu in his effort. He also began referring to Carp's "stupidity", and to the Junimists as ciocoi ("upstarts").

Additionally, Carp was facing backlash for his comments on the volatile question of Aromanian people in disputed Macedonia. Geographically cut off from its Romanian protectors, this population risked being divided between non-related Balkan nations. Interviewed by Pester Lloyd in summer 1908, Carp noted that, pressed upon by other priorities, Romania could only watch like Hecuba as the Aromanian land was divided between other states. There followed an intense media campaign against Carp: according to historian Stoica Lascu, the Romanian press was unwilling to accept a "pragmatic, utilitarian, unemotional" perspective on Macedonia. Democrația described the Conservative response to Aromanian pleas as "cynical", and the "Hecuba" comment was an object of derision and journalistic metaphors for the remainder of Carp's life.

=== Second Carp cabinet ===
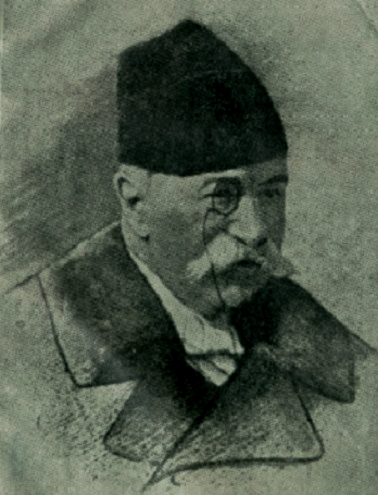
Carp, ca. 1914

In December 1910, Brătianu relinquished government. Carp was again appointed Premier and Minister of Finance, in what was to be his last presence in government. Under Carp, Alexandru Marghiloman took over as Minister of the Interior. The elections of February 1911, coordinated by Marghiloman, were allegedly carried out with widespread intimidation and fraud. Reportedly, the Minister initially negotiated with the PNL and Take Ionescu, offering 55 seats to the opposition, but, being refused, allowed them only 42 seats at the vote count. The events only escalated Carp's conflict with Ionescu. The Conservative-Democrat leader stated that the new administration was illegitimate in front of both country and Crown.

The cabinet, which had Filipescu as Minister of War, still made overtures toward Ionescu (including the promise to uphold social insurance for industrial workers or tax cuts for the rural poor). There was also rumor that Carp, the opponent of centralism, had designed a project to replace the Prefectures with so-called Căpitănii ("Captaincies"). Although such measures were not effected, the new administration was successful in tackling other issues: both deficit and the cost of living dropped while the bank reserves trebled, and some palliatives were introduced in lieu of a land reform (the promised tax cuts, plus the freeing of mainmorte property). These policies angered the opposition Conservative-Democrats, who complained that Carp had "monkeyed" their own reform program. By January 1912, they joined up with the PNL in organizing mass demonstrations, calling for an immediate transfer of power, and alleging that a mass repression was being organized against them by government troops—claims met with sarcasm by Conservative newspapers such as Epoca.

Accused of having sacked non-Conservatives from national administration and of censoring the opposition, the Premier liberalized the trade in alcohol, overturned the blue law (thus ingratiating himself with the tavern-keeping lobby), and allowed soldiers to vote and run in elections. Carp also sought some bipartisan solutions, but had to deal with accusations of incompetence: the promotion of General Alexandru Averescu, a suspected embezzler, and the mishandling of public works (scrutinized by Nicolae Fleva) turned into prolonged scandals. Another political controversy opposed Carp to the leaders of the Romanian Orthodox Church. It began when the Conservatives, wishing to overturn the PNL's partnership with members of the clergy, attempted to topple Metropolitan-Primate Atanasie Mironescu with support from Gherasim Safirin. That push offered political ammunition to Ionescu, who called Carp's religious policy "debauchery". Mironescu held his seat for forty days, but eventually resigned in protest, and was replaced with Conon Arămescu-Donici.

The Carp cabinet still managed to impose its policies on other contentious topics. By March 1912, when he passed a new law on Northern Dobruja, Carp had adopted the colonial views of his contemporaries: all ethnic Romanian immigrants to the province, including the new arrivals from Transylvania, were raised to the same level of citizenship as the local Muslims. In unison, Carp again overrode the Aromanian issue, resuming friendly relations with the Aromanians' nominal oppressor, the Kingdom of Greece. He rejected Aromanian pleas to demand concessions from the Greek government, noting: "I shan't allow Romanian Macedonians to interfere with Romania's foreign policy." The Carp administration, and even its Aromanian public servants, opined that the Aromanian community was small in numbers and virtually Hellenized. This stance was mirrored by Carol's, who ordered absolute neutrality on the issue of ethnic clashes in Macedonia.

Although Carp had publicized his detailed program of government, the focus fell on a scandalous "Tramcar Affair", which the Premier was keen to exploit. At election time, Marghiloman revealed that the PNL had patronized a corruption network which misused the Bucharest Town Hall budget, meaning that various National Liberal figures risked being arrested. Carp refused to negotiate on the issue, even after the two opposition parties embarked on their anti-government campaign. Through its junior member Constantin Stere, PNL also began agitating for universal male suffrage (a project which the PNL itself later buried).

In November 1911, P. P. Carp gave his locally famous "Hot Iron" (Fierul Roșu) speech in Parliament, announcing his intention of branding the PNL as a party of thieves. The legal face-off between the Tramcar Society and the authorities who attempted to dissolve it was advantageous to the former, and hurt Marghiloman's prestige. The Interior Minister was caught up and mauled in a PNL-instigated public rally, and the Bucharest Conservative Chapter was sacked before Police could intervene. The Conservatives responded with a peaceful show of unity, during which Carp accused the opposition of sparking revolution to preserve a mere business interest. King Carol decided to mediate, asking Carp to seek a rapprochement with the Conservative-Democrats, but Take Ionescu posed unlikely conditions, such as a reformed constitutional regime and a public apology from Carp to Ion I. C. Brătianu.

=== 1913 marginalization ===
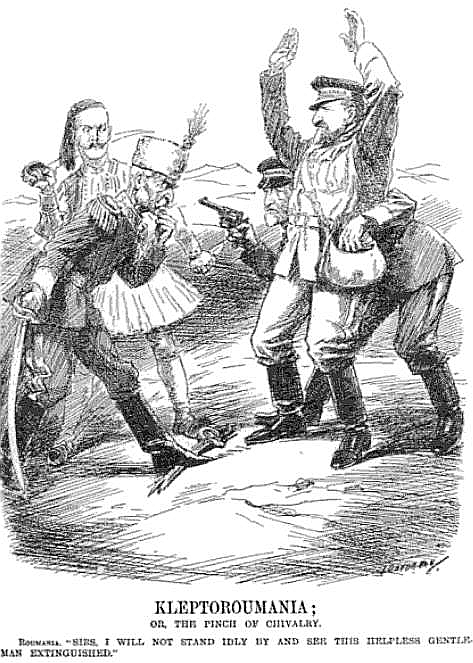
Kleptoroumania: Carol I "stealing" Southern Dobruja from Ferdinand I of Bulgaria, Punch cartoon (August 6, 1913)

What happened next shocked Carp, and ruined his friendship with Maiorescu. In April 1912, the latter extended his hand to Ionescu and Filipescu, and a new coalition was created against both Brătianu and Carp. Once Maiorescu took over as Premier, Carp handed in his resignation from the post of party leader (stating "I'll not sacrifice immortal ideas for a passing chairmanship"), but his colleagues refused to accept it; he did not present himself for the 1912 elections, and became the only head of a parliamentary party not to hold a seat. In 1913, he tried to reaffirm his position in the Conservative Party by convening an irregular Party Congress, but effectively lost the leadership.

These events coincided with a new international crisis, centered on the new Kingdom of Bulgaria. The First Balkan War of 1912 opened the way to a Greater Bulgaria, posing various threats to Romanian territorial ambitions. The mood in Bucharest was pro-war, and the populace saw an opportunity for hitting the interests of the Triple Alliance. Unusually, Carp numbered himself among the more hawkish proponents of a preemptive war with Bulgaria, suggesting outright the annexation of Southern Dobruja. Instead, Maiorescu signed a Russian-brokered peace deal, through which Romania received Silistra. This concession failed to satisfy Carp and his supporters, and also sparked a militaristic reaction in Bulgaria.

A Second Balkan War erupted, in which Romania joined the regional coalition against Bulgaria and occupied all the Dobrujan South. While the Maiorescu administration prepared the Peace of Bucharest, and after failed efforts to make himself obeyed by fellow Conservatives, Carp presented his resignation to Ioan Lahovary, head of the Bucharest Conservative Club. This time around, it was accepted. In one of his letters, Negruzzi discussed how Carp braved his political isolation with jokes and wit, but noted: "Only he knows how it really feels deep down. [...] As the saying goes: a man will do things to himself that the devil will not even venture to attempt." At the time, Carp's son Grigore was also coming under attack from the political opposition. Furnica, the satirical magazine, accused Carp Sr of nepotism, noting that Grigore had taken a position of power inside the Bucharest bureaucracy.

Although he was no longer on speaking terms with Carp, Maiorescu valued his hard-line stance on the sensitive land reform issue, and, as new National Liberal cabinet was in the making, urged Carol to accept Carp as Leader of the Opposition. This offer was again dismissed by Carp, who felt himself betrayed a second time when Maiorescu ran unopposed for the Conservative chairmanship (November 1913). During early 1914, the Conservatives faced another split, when some of their members (Simion Mehedinți, Dimitrie Onciul etc.) created the faction of "Conservative-Progressives", who demanded the enactment of some political reforms not found in Maiorescu's program. Unlike Carp, Maiorescu had already decided to retire, but only did so when he made sure that his disciple Marghiloman would succeed him (June 1914).

=== World War I hawk ===
The start of World War I in August 1914 was a moment of deep crisis for Romania. The country was still aligned with the Central Powers, through the Triple Alliance, but the Romanian public was largely supporting the Entente Powers. Going against the grain, Carp was for honoring the previous commitment, asking for Romania to declare war on the Entente, and therefore on Russia. He and King Carol were the only two statesmen who supported that option during the Crown Council of August 3, where a majority decided in favor of prolonged neutrality. The king and his former minister were saddened by the circumstances of their defeat: when Carp stated that the majority was legitimate but regrettable, Carol shook his hand and called him "a true statesman". During the Council, Carp first made public his belief that the Central Powers were unbeatable, and reprimanded the PNL men who voted for neutrality: "Nice one you pulled off. You have wrecked Romania."

Carol died on September 27, and was succeeded by his nephew Ferdinand I. Between March 1915 and August 1916, with private German funding, Carp put out the political newspaper Moldova, which popularized his take on the war, and, as historian Ion Bulei writes, "was entirely against the nation's current." In his first editorial, Idealul național ("The National Ideal"), he implied that Romania's very survival was uncertain as long as Russia still bordered the Danube Delta; he therefore urged Romanians to focus on taking back the province of Bessarabia, held by Russia since 1812. Carp again advised against war on the Central Powers for the taking of Transylvania: "If we take Transylvania and lose the Mouths of the Danube, we are lost and so is Transylvania. If, on the other hand, we extend our borders to the Dniester, the Transylvania issue will be there to solve for future generations, with ease and without going into conflict with the Austro-Hungarian Empire." He explained his rationale in more detail within the 1915 brochure România și Războiul European ("Romania and the European War"), issued with Poporul S. A., where he noted that a unified Greater Romania was the stuff of utopia, and stressed that Transylvania's Romanians could benefit from Austrian loyalism.

Such ideas were also being expressed by other Moldova collaborators. The paper postulated that "Germany is invincible", and that national unity "can only begin with the liberation of Bessarabia". The staff included co-editor Virgil Arion, who published "Carpist" opinion pieces. Carp's ideas were also taken up by Dinu C. Arion (Virgil Arion's nephew), Ioan D. Filitti, Marin Simionescu-Râmniceanu and D. V. Barnoschi. Other interventions were signed by Negruzzi, Andrei Corteanu, Alexis Nour, Radu Rosetti, and various pseudonymous authors. Moldova also offered ample space to the Bessarabian-born Germanophile Constantin Stere, Carp's former rival in the "Tramcar Affair".

The Conservative Party was again divided, as an "Ententist" bloc emerged around Nicolae Filipescu; the most prominent and committed "Germanophiles" were Carp, Maiorescu, Th. Rosetti and Marghiloman. Within the latter camp, Carp was the more radical, for demanding a quick intervention. He continuously warned that the reported sufferings of the Transylvanian folk were a minor issue when compared with the need to preserve Romania's independence. This notion was expressed in his last speech to Parliament, a reply to Take Ionescu's pro-Entente rhetoric (December 1915)—as various commentators have noted, it was not Carp's greatest proof of elocution. Others, however, deem it "memorable", "unequaled", or at least "remarkable".

In January 1916, Moldova came out under the headline "We Want War with Russia". The Maiorescu-Marghiloman faction opted instead for friendly neutrality—they only envisaged active participation if the Austrians were to hand over Bukovina region, and if the legal status of Transylvanian Romanians would be improved. Sources record Marghiloman's attempt to mediate a new understanding between Carp and Maiorescu, rejected by Carp with the words: "Never, nothing with Maiorescu." The Entente's envoy Carlo Fasciotti perceived Maiorescu as more flexible, and repeatedly tried to talk him out of Germanophile politics.

=== Carp and the German occupation ===
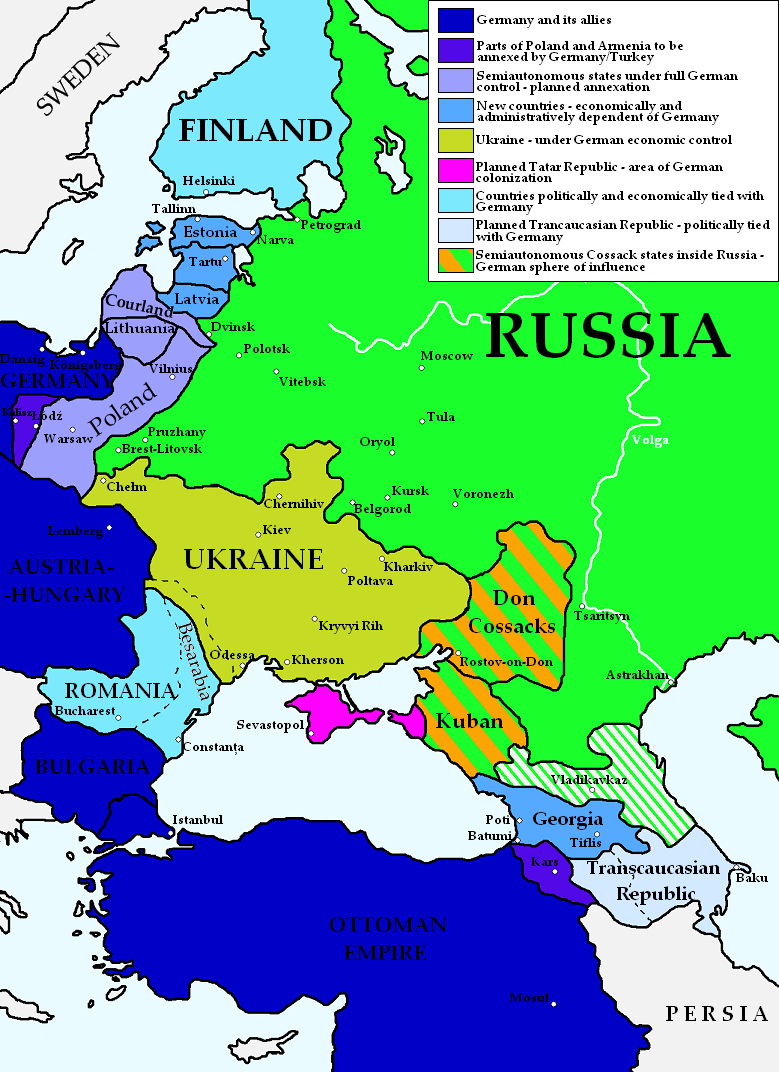
German plans for Mitteleuropa after the 1918 peace. Romania as one of the client states (in cyan), extending into the western half of Bessarabia

In the second half of 1916, the Germanophile option was ruled out by Premier Ion I. C. Brătianu. With Ferdinand's acquiescence, Brătianu signed the secret treaty of Bucharest, which attached Romania to the Entente and promised her the annexation of Transylvania and Bukovina (see Romania in World War I). The news was communicated to the country's statesmen at a new Crown Council, on August 27, 1916. There followed a heated exchange between Carp and the King, as witnessed by the other participants—including arch-rival Take Ionescu, who noted "[Carp] is Shakespearean in his error." Prophesying defeat, Carp brought into discussion Ferdinand's German (Hohenzollern-Sigmaringen) lineage. To his "No Hohenzollern was ever defeated", Ferdinand tacitly acknowledged the issue: "I have already defeated one" (that is, himself). Carp then shocked the audience by stating: "I shall pray to God that the Romanian army be defeated", or, "I wish you'd be vanquished, for your victory would mean the country's destruction and demise." Sources also diverge on what Carp said next. One story is that he promised to sacrifice his sons for a cause he did not believe in, by allowing them to be drafted into the Romanian military. According to others, what he actually meant was that the three young men would be serving the Central Powers.

In fact, Lieutenant Petre Carp Jr died shortly after, serving as a Ferdinand loyalist in the abortive Romanian expedition into Transylvania. The loss greatly affected Carp, who withdrew to Țibănești, before friends persuaded him to join them in Bucharest. He was in the city as Romanian troops registered crushing defeats, and watched on as the King and his ministers followed the army on a hasty retreat into Moldavia. As the Romanian authorities established a provisional capital in Iași, the indignant Carp personally witnessed the triumphal entry of German troops into Bucharest.

The occupiers, especially Germans, regarded Carp as a friend, or, according to researcher Lisa Meyerhofer, "a natural ally." Through negotiator Alexandru Tzigara-Samurcaș, the invading force initially called on Carp and Maiorescu to join their effort of pacifying Romania; both Junimists promptly rejected this offer. Carp himself referred to the project as "nonsense", and bluntly refused to be contacted by Maiorescu for further deliberation on the subject. Soon however, a core group of "Carpist" supporters, headed by the bureaucrat Lupu Kostaki, became the nominal civil administration of occupied Romania. The exercise of powers by the new apparatus varied greatly: Kostaki, appointed Verweser (temporary administrator) at the Interior Ministry, could only advise on some policy matters, while Al. C. Hinna had a free say in organizing the Justice department.

Carp did not hold an official post, but he was the éminence grise, arranging the removal of most bureaucrats who had been left behind by the Brătianu cabinet, or drafting plans for a future Carp cabinet in conversations with German military ruler August von Mackensen. The proposed government was to include Kostaki, Barnoschi, Radu Rosetti and Dimitrie S. Nenițescu, alongside zoologist Grigore Antipa and Colonel Victor Verzea. The Carpists were still committed to the cause of Bessarabia, and Kostaki assured his backers that, with German help, the province would eventually be made part of Romania. Early in 1917, Carp's son in law, Colonel Alexandru D. Sturdza, deserted from the Moldavian front and made his way to Bucharest. He claimed that Russia had effectively occupied Moldavia, and wanted to organize a rival Romanian Army to liberate Iași. Some sources state that Carp immediately repudiated him upon arrival, but one account places Sturdza among Carp's visitors and confidants, as late as December 1917.

In summer 1917, Lupu Kostaki issued a document popularly known under the archaic, and possibly mocking, title of Pantahuza ("The Encyclical"). It was in effect a list of signatures for creating a Carp dictatorship upon the end of war, and its social impact, even in the context of occupation, was minor. Meanwhile, plagued by heart trouble and depression, Maiorescu died, an event which pushed Junimism farther on the road to collapse. Carp made a point of not attending his rival's funeral, commenting: "Why should I pay Maiorescu a courtesy visit that he will never be able to return?"

=== 1918 reversal and Carp's death ===
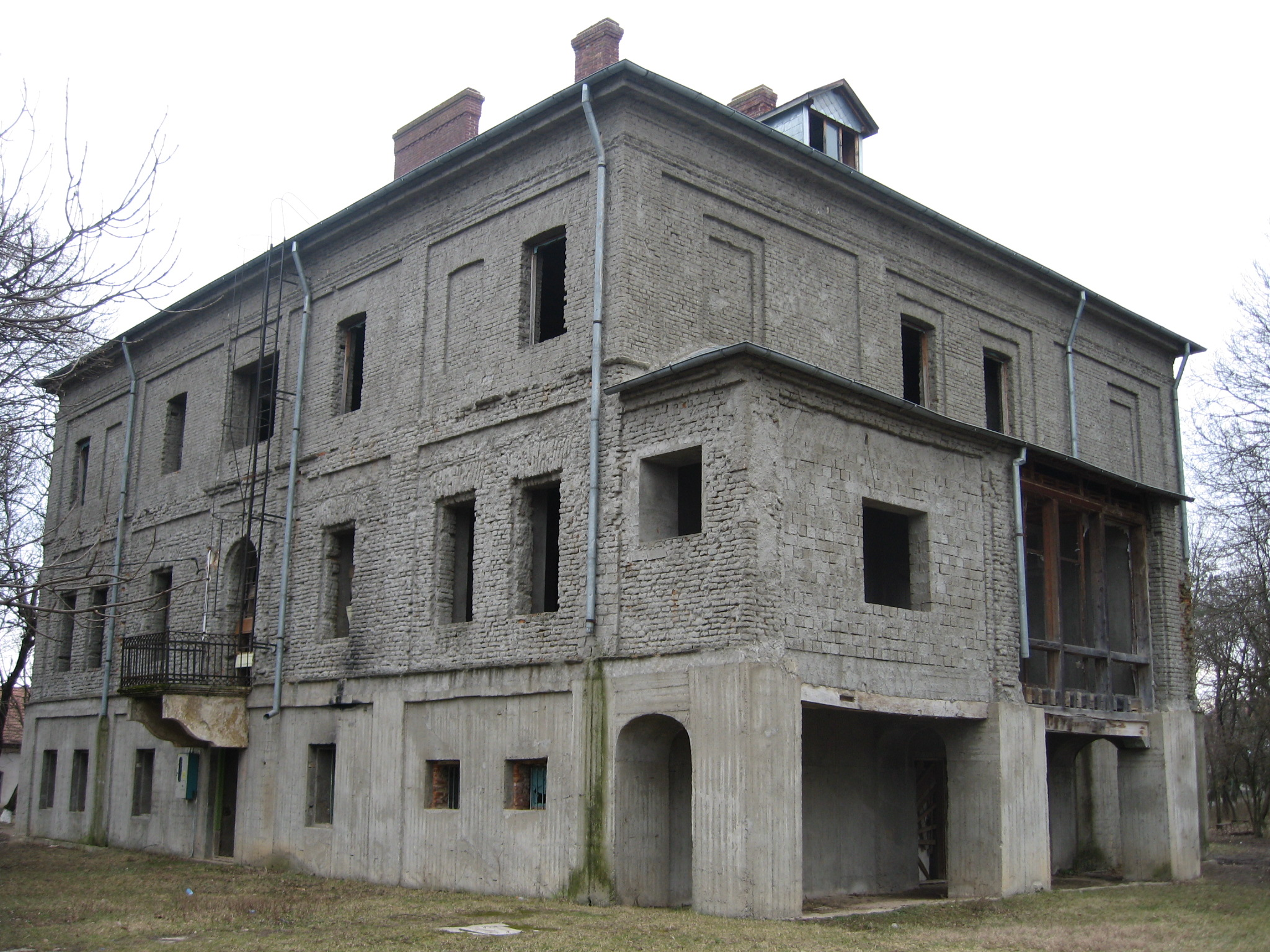
Țibănești Manor, partially reconstructed (2008)

By early 1918, the government in Iași was experiencing a major military crisis. The October Revolution and the Treaty of Brest-Litovsk took Russia out of the war, and Ferdinand eventually appointed Marghiloman Premier, allowing him to sign Romania's disadvantageous peace with Germany. Carp, together with the Germanophile diplomat Ioan C. Filitti, also attempted to take part in brokering this deal, but found the treaty to be very unfair toward his defeated country. Meanwhile, in March, the Bessarabian Moldavian Democratic Republic entered a union with Romania, which, to his contemporaries, seemed to confirm that Carp had been right about the outcome of war.

Later, some Carpists joined Marghiloman's administration as it attempted to restore order in the land, but most continued to campaign for their own leader to take hold of government. On Carp's namesday (June 29, 1918), he received an open letter, signed by 40 of his supporters, describing him as a providential figure, and calling on him to fulfill his political mission of governing Romania. In addition to senior Carpists, the signers included poet Alexandru Macedonski and Caragiale's two sons, Mateiu and Luca. On Marghiloman's list, Carp was elected deputy in the legislative election of 1918. However, he chose not to take part in proceedings, and his seat was left vacant. His political line was expressed by means of a new gazette, Renașterea ("The Renaissance"), published by Nenițescu with assistance from Kostaki, Radu Rosetti, Alexandru Al. Beldiman and Ion Gorun. Renașterea went down in late November 1918, shortly after the unexpected Armistice with Germany sealed the fate of Germanophiles and brought the Ententists back into focus.

The new context again cemented the Ententists' reputation: the country, now joined with Bessarabia, became Greater Romania when the Romanian Transylvanians voted for their own union act, and Bukovina too was incorporated. The developments perplexed Carp, leaving him to comment: "Romania is so lucky, that she can do without her statesmen." By early 1919, he was living in seclusion at his Țibănești manor. During May, the King's Commissioner began an investigation into Germanophile activities, questioning Carp about his wartime activities, and, more insistently, about those of his disciples. This action sparked protests in the media. Even the formerly Ententist Adevărul daily noted, through Constantin Costa-Foru, that the effort to make Carp incriminate himself was "a despicable calumny." Similarly, the Bucovina gazette of Iancu Flondor and Pamfil Șeicaru expressed concern that "a moribund" was being hassled while "so many common delinquents roam free".

According to Carp's own words: "We have entered the era of revenge acts initiated by scoundrels and nitwits." However, the National Liberal establishment was itself unsure about how to approach the Carp dilemma. Discussing the 1919 prosecutions in his later essays, PNL leader Ion G. Duca asserted: "Should one have limited them to the Carpists? [...] Could one, in the name of holy justice, punish them, without also punishing Carp, their leader and inspiration? And would it have been politically sound to prosecute Carp, at his more than 80 years of age, after his 50 years of honest public life?"

After illness, Petre P. Carp died in Țibănești, on June 19, 1919, being almost 82 years of age. In a Bucovina epitaph, Șeicaru deplored the departure of one great "reactionary", "a man of too great dimensions to be fighting against such small people".

== Political vision ==
=== General traits ===
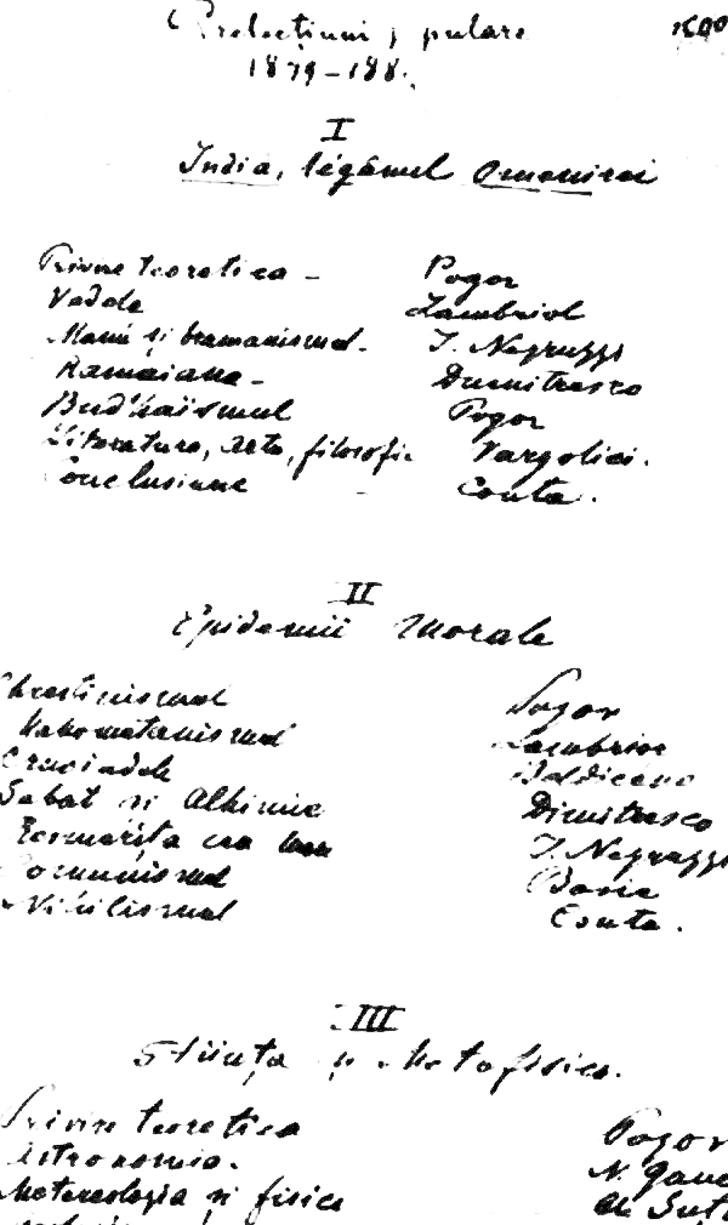
An 1879 program of the Junimea public lectures, listing Christianity, Communism and Nihilism under Epidemii morale ("moral epidemics")

Initially a cultural venture, Junimea fought for a new order in Romanian culture, and not least of all for German influences. Historian Lucian Boia defines their effort as "a bitter combat for 'disciplining' Romanian culture, for its emergence from dilettante Romanticism and the adoption of a responsible and rigorous attitude". P. P. Carp embodied the political force of Junimism, a fact once noted by Maiorescu: "When Junimea's literary activity ceased in Iași, when Junimea was gone—Junimists stayed on. Amid this group of older and newer arrivals [was] the man who synthesized its political action, Mr. P. Carp, with his recognized talent of capturing and rendering the characteristic note of any situation". Carp had a similar role in shaping the Conservative Party—in his own words, the pre-Era Nouă party life was self-contradictory and the party line was "hodgepodge". Virgil Nemoianu proposes that, from the early 1870s, their participation in government, with all its contradictions, hastened the emergence of a "liberal conservatism", or "B-conservatism", that eventually restructured Catargiu's traditional conservatism. Although for long informal, Carp's role as Conservative mentor was universally acknowledged: in seriousness or in jest, his contemporaries would almost always address him as "Your Excellency".

An essential contribution of his was creating a political avatar of a Junimist cultural metaphor, that of "forms without content"—namely, the belief that Romanian society had swallowed up modern ideas without adapting them to its backward realities. Carp welcomed Westernization as a basic requirement, but argued that its import of "forms" had rendered politicians unwilling to address the "content". He once noted: "For some, science is all that which has seen print. They discovered, already black on white, the ideas of some author, picked up his ideas, without ever considering whether the theory agrees with the practice, whether the difficulties of accomplishing it are subject to abstract aspirations". The wholesale modernizers, he stated, were "planting flowers into sandy soil" or building "a castle on sands". In order to elevate the "content", Carp suggested a slow build-up of civic consciousness and a steady increase of the middle class.

However, as the voice of elitism, Carp criticized collective and natural rights, and argued that careers in politics should only be opened to those who already had a major source of income ("starting at 40,000 lei"). From early on, he spoke of the actual nation as being a country's ruling class, excluding "plebs", and even proposed the reduction of parliamentary seats by half. Carp believed that: "Since [...] the Pharaohs of Egypt, the demagogues have been inciting the passions of the plebs and preaching democracy and the redistribution of wealth. For millenniums now, the crowd and the rabble keep on working, and the elite keeps on governing". In his definition, the office holders needed to remain at all times separate from the passionate crowd. A physician, he argued, could trust his patients to describe their symptoms, but should not take their orders on what medicine to prescribe.

Carp did not object to more democratization, but criticized the PNL's way of handling the process as a "top-down revolution", and saw the 1884 abolition of the census suffrage as untimely and absurd. Even before 1911, while debating the issue with George Panu, Carp deemed universal male suffrage a far too advanced option for Romania. Revisiting the issue in 1914, Carp also implied that the only result would be a generalized fraud, forever advantageous to the PNL. Political scientist Ioan Stanomir concludes that, once distinguished from the PNL's "Messianism" and Catargiu's "immobilism", gradualism "became, with P. P. Carp, one of the instruments with which the new conservatives sought to reorganize the state."

While exposing himself to accusations of "Germanism" from the "Red" camp during the late 1860s, young Carp mockingly stated that his priorities were in fact elsewhere: "I am not a Germanophile, I am a Russophobe." Carp, expressing alarm over the "Russian danger" in much the same terms as his nationalist rival Mihai Eminescu, is sometimes described as an "anti-Slav". He repeatedly cautioned the public that Russia's agenda, menacing for Romania, corresponded with the Pan-Slavic ideal. Thus, citing "our historical experience", Carp produced the slogan: "Under no circumstances us and Russia together", shortened by some to "Never with Russia". In 1915, he assessed that Russia was secretly planning to occupy the Danube Delta and part of Moldavia, to take over the Turkish Straits, and to turn the Black Sea into a mare clausum.

With his critique of centralism, P. P. Carp advocated not just communal self-governance, but also regionalism. He expressed the opinion that any strict control coming in from Bucharest with the purpose of erasing regional loyalties, could never expect to turn locals into better citizens. As noted by Lucian Boia, Carp's main priorities, from the recovery of Bessarabia to the protection of the Delta, mainly concerned his native Moldavia: "a national program for sure, but with an undeniable Moldavian flavor." Academic Ion Agrigoroaiei also writes: "Moldova had the merit of drawing attention to Bessarabia, a region that some [Romanians] considered as lost." Among the dedicated Moldavian Carpists, some were highly critical of rule from Wallachia, almost to the point of advocating separatism. Carp's Ententist adversaries seized on this ambiguity, accusing Carp of being not just a traitor, but also a Moldavian secessionist.

=== Carp on social improvement ===
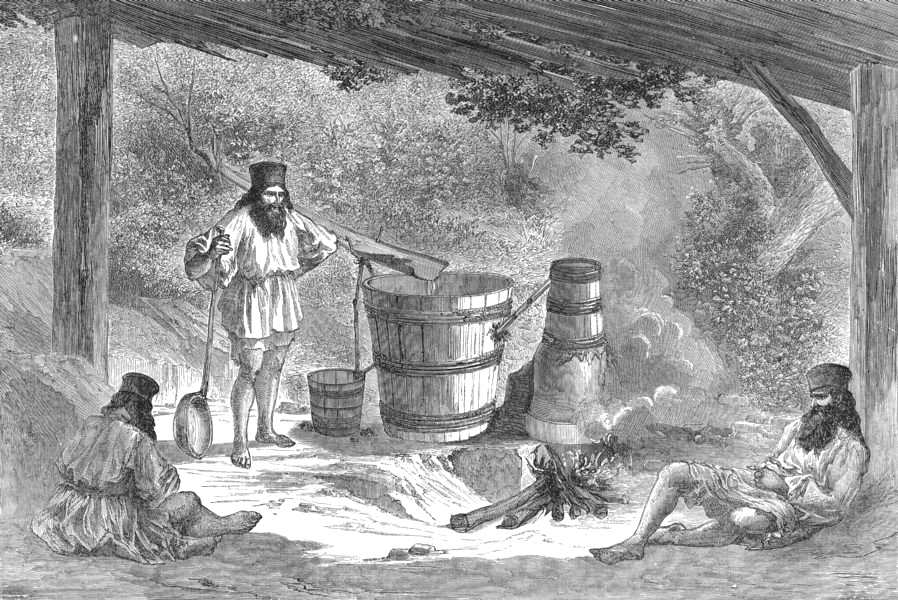
Moonshiners of Wallachia, depicted in 1880

Carp saw himself as a pragmatic man, noting that his interest in policy was determined by real needs, rather than by political schemes, "literary phantasmagoria" or "abstract theories". In effect, commentators propose, Carp and Maiorescu were the exponents of a liberal-conservative and Tory ethos, with models such as Alexis de Tocqueville (repeatedly invoked by Carp), François Guizot and Edmund Burke. Supporting economic liberalism and free trade, Carp urged the Romanian underclass to enrich itself through private enterprise, but came to the conclusion that Romanians were naturally inclined to evade work. His attempt to regulate the alcohol industry was related to that discourse: Carp stated that peasants "should be protected from their own vices", and once told an irate Eminescu that, in addition to being "lazy", the Romanians were "drunks". Such attitudes lead scholar Sorin Adam Matei to conclude that Carp was a paternalistic positivist by reflex.

In the 1880s, Carp openly stated that the Junimist goal was the complete integration into society of people with no wealth of their own—or, as he called them, "proletarians". This, more than the protection of landed property, inspired him to oppose land reform. Carp argued that the land's division into small plots was inoperable, and therefore not desirable, and only saw industrial agriculture emerging from the historical estates. Additionally, the Romanian aristocrat opposed on principle the idea that the state should become involved in redistribution, arguing that the landless would in time purchase, and "slowly" learn to make the best of, their own parcels. In line with this vision, when indentured peasants threatened to stop working on the estates, he proposed sending in armed soldiers as their supervisors. His belief in labor as an instrument of self-help was taken up in his own private life: at age 70, Carp could be seen planting walnut trees or packing butter, although, to the left-wing journalist Constantin Bacalbașa, he still appeared a generally listless character.

For different reasons, Carp and Maiorescu preferred agriculture to industry, and were just as likely to demand checks on urban and industrial growth. Carp's own solution to urban proletarization was grassroots corporatism, with modernized guilds that were supposed to provide the working class with "solidarity" and "prestige". Carp imagined a guild network supported by and supporting an educational system that, unlike the one conceived by PNL-backed educationists, was to be decentralized and vocational. He intervened personally to help the schoolchildren on his Țibănești domain, donating money and participating on a student examination board (1886).

In his defense of organic capitalist enterprise, Carp also opposed the PNL's protectionism. Political scientist Victor Rizescu even suggests that his flexible economic model was a "more authentic" liberalism than the one professed by PNL men. Similarly, Matei calls Carp's "technocratic" Junimism a "second liberal tradition". Against PNL nationalists, Carp proposed to tackle deficit spendings by contracting foreign loans, although he supported the gold standard as an extra precaution. He adamantly supported foreign investments in front of repeated criticism, noting that, at the very least, they stimulated competitiveness among local businesses. The main institutional consequence, his 1895 Law on Mining, was condemned by the PNL as a huge concession to foreign capital.

The core Junimists, Carp included, were also critics of most emerging welfare state projects. Beginning in 1881, he and Maiorescu spoke out against the emergence of socialist clubs in Moldavia. Carp called them a "social disease", but, as Premier, toned down repression against all socialist groups. While Carp is often perceived as an uncompromising disciple of German nation-builder Otto von Bismarck, he had an ambiguous take on the Bismarckian State Socialism program. Nemoianu thus suggests that Junimism was largely incompatible with Bismarck's own economic tactics and political maneuvering. However, Stanomir argues, Carp did in fact conceive of an "embryonic" welfare state, "following in the trail of Bismarckian endeavors."

One of Carp's other priorities was upholding the rule of law against institutional failure. According to cultural historian Z. Ornea, Carp fashioned himself into "the apostle of honesty and selfless civic-mindedness", with "Quixotic" effects. He proposes that Carp still maintained "the Junimist principles of sincerity and honesty", whereas Maiorescu "had submitted himself to reality". Carp's attitudes, according to Silvia Bocancea, were "Manichean" and possibly theatrical at times. To his contemporaries, he seemed uncompromising to the brink of arrogance. Reportedly, Carol I once confessed: "I never felt less a King than when Carp had the reins of government", while Take Ionescu simply believed Carp to be "senile". Such mistrust also came from foreign sources. In 1903, Ambassador Kinderlen reported that, although a man with "genius ideas", the Germanophile Premier was "coarse", annoying, and inclined "to throw himself in head-first". Eight years on, the French press was reporting with displeasure on Carp's strictness, fearing that it led Romania into becoming "a German hinterland".

By the 1880s, Carp suggested, the territorial administration had been redesigned to function as a political machine, or "giant electoral device". He believed that corruption was the direct consequence of excessive politicking and bureaucracy, which absorbed human energies out of the economic sector, and which the PNL seemed to encourage. The result of such trends, he argued, was a "budgetary", "budgetivore" or etatist pseudo-democracy, as opposed to a working and transparent liberal democracy. Even after the 1882 rapprochement between Junimea and Brătianu, Carp attacked the PNL as a sanctuary of endemic corruption: "I know Mr. Brătianu does not desire [corruption], but corruption does desire him, and, with invisible but numerous arms, like those of a giant polyp, squeezes him and will squeeze him till he's choking." Shortly after the "Hot Iron" speech of 1911, he addressed Brătianu an equally famous exhortation: "Always be fair in your private life, always be selfless in your public life."

=== Philosemitism ===
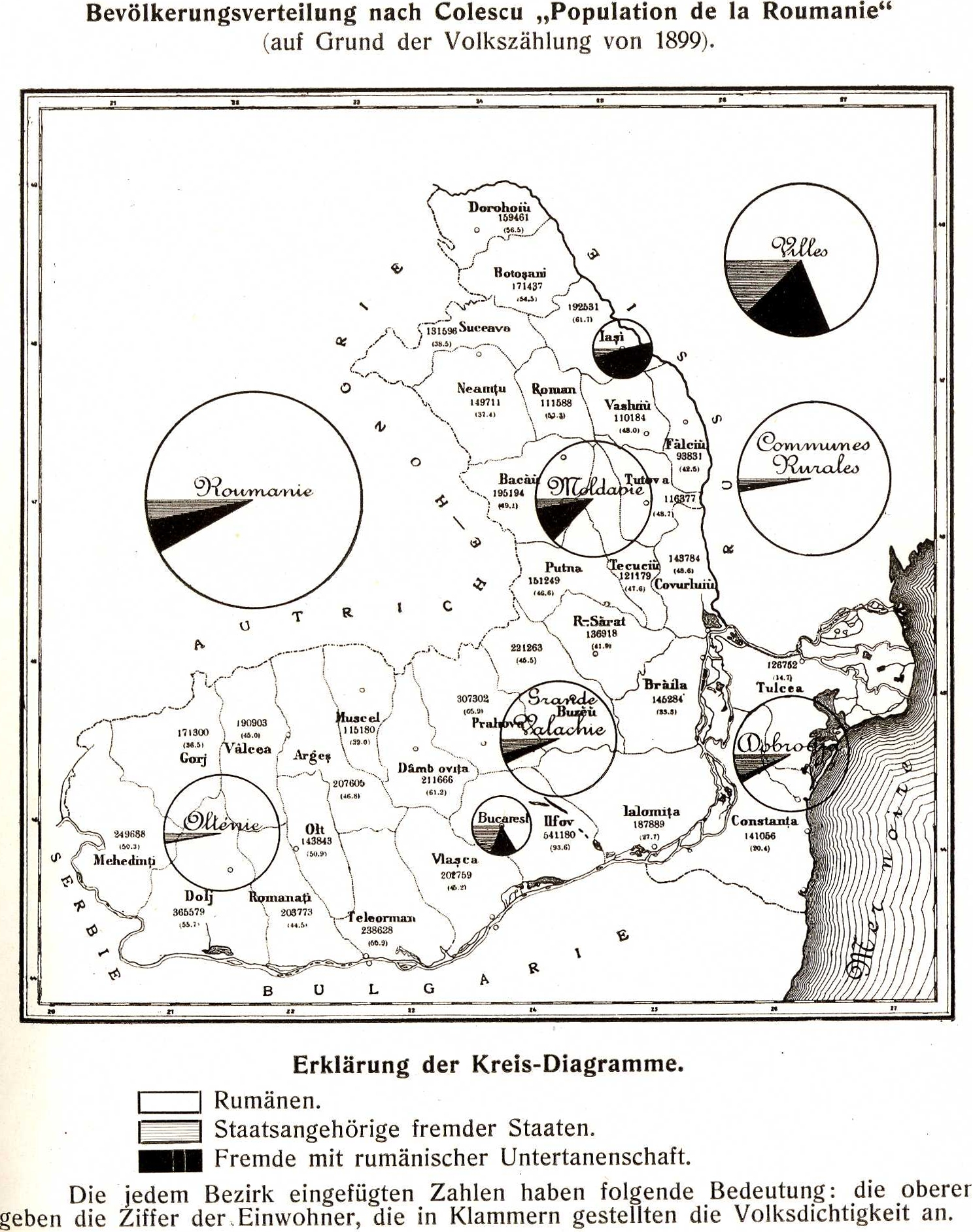
Kingdom of Romania map of 1899, showing the distribution of citizens (white), aliens (gray) and non-citizen subjects (black)

P. P. Carp was an outspoken critic of generic intolerance, seeing it as the enemy of civic values. Speaking in 1892, he theorized: "Culturally speaking, the first sign of a backward state is intolerance. When somebody thinks that only he is right, that there is nothing outside his brain and absolutely nothing in social life, he is an uncultured being, who never had a chance of knowing how varied, how many, there are manifestations of human thinking." As Carp noted, the natural breakdown of "forms without content", and the disruption of traditional lifestyles, had made it tempting for regular Romanians, and for crowd-pleasing orators, to use the Jew as a scapegoat. Carp's political isolation was only increased by such discourse. According to Virgil Nemoianu, Carp was his usual "trenchant" speaker on this subject as well. Historian Armin Heinen notes that, with the minor socialist movement and, at times, Maiorescu, Carp was one of the very few to demand collective Jewish emancipation in the final quarter of the 19th century.

Carp's openness on this issue dated back to his political debut, and was at the time compatible with the philosemitic agenda of Alexander John Cuza. It was opposed to the antisemitic program adopted in 1860 by Ion Brătianu and the Moldavian "Fractionists", and later to the PNL's overall antisemitism, but Carp also shunned antisemites in his own camp, including Eminescu. During its brief existence, Térra attacked "Red" politics as duplicitous, noting that the liberals arbitrarily expelled Jews from Romania and excused pogroms, but that they feigned innocence whenever European observers were brought in. These pronouncements also impacted on Carp's traditional rivalry with Bogdan Petriceicu Hasdeu. Hasdeu dismissed young Carp, Maiorescu and their patron Manolache Costache Epureanu as the "Judaized" Moldavians, and continued to periodically target Carp which such remarks for over thirty years.

As an extension of his ideas on industriousness, Carp also advised Romanians to reject the PNL's economic antisemitism, insisting that the solution to all real economic problems was the capitalist work ethic. He witnessed with concern how antisemitism damaged Western attitudes about Romania. In the early 1870s, when Bismarck implied that Romania's Jews risked being stoned by their Christian neighbors, he replied (probably tongue-in-cheek): "Your Excellency should not forget that the Romanian has barely emerged out of the Stone Age." His unpopular ideas on the Jewish issue only had one prominent Romanian disciple, the Junimist philosopher Constantin Rădulescu-Motru, who used them in denouncing the antisemitic Democratic Nationalist Party.

Although Carp's views on Jewish integration were exceptionally modern, his philosemitism had its specific limitations. These were discussed by cultural historian William O. Oldson, for whom Carp is, "by Romanian standards", the "most magnanimous" and "altruistic" of 19th-century legislators. However, Oldson cautions, Carp's own project granted "piecemeal" concessions to local Jews. As Junimist leader, he did not intervene to help Jewish linguist Lazăr Șăineanu, whose naturalization was energetically opposed by the PNL antisemites. By 1912, Carp's own law excluded Jewish and Armenian immigrants to Northern Dobruja from even being considered in the naturalization process.

=== Carpist "renaissance" ===
In 1917, the massive failure of pro-Entente forces seemed to confirm that P. P. Carp had been right to press for a German alliance. Carp's supporters, and probably Carp as well, believed that the occupation signaled a "renaissance of the Romanian state". A conjectural supporter, Alexandru Al. Beldiman, summarized its immediate goals: "we must reform the very foundation of internal administration, primary schooling, agrarian relations and the peasant issue; we must again generate the conditions for a well-governed state." Carp himself came to the conclusion that it was necessary to depose Ferdinand I and offer the Romanian throne to a German or an Austrian prince. Romanian monarchism, Carp thought, was doomed either way, since Ferdinand's Russian allies were only going to depose him in due course. According to diaries kept by his Germanophile friends, he even began referring to Ferdinand as "that ass", and found Prince Frederick William a most suitable candidate for the Romanian throne.

Still a legalist, Carp refused to enact such a program before Ferdinand and his government had been completely defeated. Reputedly, he informed the occupiers: "get moving and drive the Russians entirely out of the country—then we'll be talking about organizing and creating my administration." According to Marghiloman, he later reduced such demands, only urging the Germans to quickly nominate their own choice of a Romanian king. He irritated the occupiers, addressing them as equals or posing more direct demands, and advising Lupu Kostaki to behave in the same manner. However, researchers suggest, his cooperative stance was always more controversial than that of his nominal enemy Maiorescu. The latter politely refused offers for joining Kostaki's ministry, and remained loyal to Ferdinand until the moment of his death.

Lucian Boia believes that Marghiloman's rise to power in early 1918 was Ferdinand's compromise with the moderate Germanophiles: "[Marghiloman] had not turned more German than the Germans, as Carp had done. He had not spoken out against the dynasty, although he let it be understood that the king might reconsider the situation and abdicate. [...] In circumstances where defeat was being acknowledged, Marghiloman seemed to be the one solution. Carp was too old, too intransigent and too isolated." Moreover, before becoming Premier, Marghiloman had categorically denounced the Pantahuza conspiracy. In Carp's view, Marghiloman's separate peace of 1918 was scandalous, because (he claimed) the territorial demands of Romania's lesser adversaries had taken precedence over Germany's long-term projects. Reputedly, he and Beldiman worked hard to undermine Marghiloman's reputation with the German side. Carp's refusal to participate in the 1918 Parliament was another sign of dissatisfaction. According to his political ally Nenițescu: "Neither Carp nor I shall be taking part in parliamentary procedures. This legislature is a sham. They elected many Liberals and [Conservative-Democrats] who have fled to Marghiloman's camp."

== Literary contribution ==
Carp's contribution to Romanian literature was incidental, and his choice of literary subjects evoked political priorities. That political propensity even touched his work as translator: as Nemoianu writes, Carp and the other early Junimists were trying to raise the expectations of Romanians by familiarizing them with the Western canon. According to Carp's biographer Constantin Gane, such cultural efforts were in the end "consumed by the torch of political passion". Writing in the 1940s, literary historian George Călinescu assessed that the first-generation Junimists largely failed at generating great literature; he includes Carp in a category of society members who are "either outside literature, or forgotten." Other readers have also argued that the Constitutionalist spokesman had effectively squandered his literary chances, a "prodigal son" who missed out on improving the literary content of Junimism. Nevertheless, Carp still managed to maintain a reputation as the "harshest and most cultured critic" among Junimea affiliates (according to Iacob Negruzzi).

Junimism was mainly directed at the Romanticism and didacticism of its liberal adversaries, demanding clarity in style and the preservation of classical unities. Carp's Neoclassicism was complete, whereas in other Junimists it blended with Romanticism. The entire club was, as theater historian Marina Cap Bun writes, "obsessed" with the work of Shakespeare. Carp's other references, upheld in front of other authors, include Jean de La Fontaine in poetry, Gotthold Ephraim Lessing in drama, and Arthur Schopenhauer in general aesthetics—his expectation that these models would interest his contemporaries were, according to cultural historian Z. Ornea, unrealistic. Against those with "corrupted" tastes, Carp also upheld a local figure, the Junimea poet Vasile Alecsandri.

Carp's work as a reviewer blended politics with aesthetics, a "ferociously destructive" or "excessively incisive" attack on the supremacy of dilettante Romantics. He was at times only interested in pure derision, and, together with Vasile Pogor, remains recognized as the "acerbic" Junimea ironist. In reference to Hasdeu's historiographic tracts, Carp wrote: "To even discuss his parchments is but the custom of parvenus." Similarly, in tackling Gheorghe Sion's politically charged fables, Carp asserted that nobody but Sion could ever comprehend them: "the only clear things about [the edition] are [Sion's] portrait and the preface". In a more famous debate, he rejected Hasdeu's attempt to introduce a Romantic cult around Ion Vodă cel Cumplit. Hasdeu believed that, in his constant battle against the medieval aristocracy and the clergy, Ion Vodă served a national interest; contrarily, Carp wrote that "tyranny and cruelty" could never serve the public, and that Hasdeu's favorite was merely a glorified sadist. His stance on the issue was of contemporary interest, because Carp implicitly criticized those "Reds" who supported Domnitor Cuza's authoritarianism. However, Carp's later condemnation of Hasdeu's Răzvan și Vidra "lacks common sense", according to George Călinescu. Carp contended that the work, a "mystification" of little artistic worth, should never even have been made public. Hasdeu defied his rival with similar jibes, and, when he put out a new edition of the work, even used Carp's article as a foreword.

In matters of literary style, Carp tried to follow his own guidelines, and played a minor but relevant part in the development of literary Romanian. He was interested in cohesion and modernity, as acknowledged by linguist I. E. Torouțiu: "Carp's language stepped out of its temporal framework and placed itself 60 years ahead in time [...]. Carp has contributed to purifying and renovating our literary language". Between successive editions, his translations were purged of residual and odd neologisms, adopting pure phonemic orthography, and helped define standard theatrical jargon. Under his management, Térra newspaper had an informative and calm tone, defying the sensationalism of other press venues and adopting the standards of cultural Junimism. However, Carp passes for, at best, an acceptable writer—"very good", but still not "great", according to his Junimea colleague A. D. Xenopol. His Shakespearean translations are, according to Călinescu, "bad". It remains unclear whether Carp truly followed the English originals: when a journalist expressed his doubts about his linguistic proficiency, Carp visited him and calmly addressed him what may have been English words of profanity. Carp's claim has again been placed in doubt when, generations later, it surfaced that he took his notes from the German-language Shakespeare editions.

Carp made his leading contribution with speeches, and is traditionally regarded as one of the top orators in his generation. According to Ion Bulei, his voice was shrill, with an exotic Moldavian lilt, but Carp always imposed himself by being "intelligent and concise", in sharp contrast with the "Romantic phraseology" of his contemporaries. As a public speaker, Carp sometimes resumed his earlier press debates with the PNL, notably by reproaching on his adversaries that they were enshrining Romania's own version of Whig history. He was especially upset by the accolades bestowed on PNL men for their supposed roles in obtaining Romanian independence. In 1886 Carp offered an alternative Junimist narrative of how "national sovereignty" came about, with only two actors: "the king and the foot soldier".

The PNL's own Ion G. Duca once acknowledged that P. P. Carp was "the most spiritual man of his time." However, according to Eliza Brătianu, the Conservative doyen easily made himself enemies with his wit, and was often misunderstood by his peers. Carp, she writes, had the character of a spoiled "only child", and was constantly "ahead of his time". His Junimist sarcasm was transferred into his political discourse, and some of his caustic remarks have been preserved in cultural memory. During the battle for Conservative leadership, Carp addressed Gheorghe Grigore Cantacuzino's claim to have the purity and transparency of crystals, informing him that see-through beakers were usually empty. In 1901, when deputy Grigore Trandafil metaphorically offered his own head if Carp would renounce fiscal reform, Carp retorted, deadpan: "I'd have no use for it." In reference to Take Ionescu's public speaking abilities, he argued: "Talent does not justify all avatars, just as beauty does not justify all forms of prostitution".

== Legacy ==
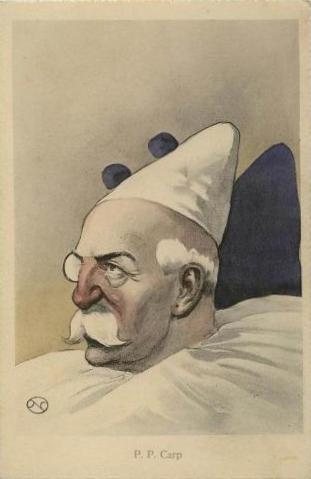
Carp as Pierrot, caricature by Nicolae Petrescu-Găină

A few years after Carp's death, despite Marghiloman's revival attempts, the Conservative Party diminished and was absorbed into the eclectic People's Party, taking with it the legacy of 19th-century conservatism. According to Bulei, "a wave of indignation and oblivion" erased Carp's political precepts from Romanian public life. Writing in 2010, Bocancea suggested that Carp's disappearance was the loss of a political model, characterized by "conviction", "the refusal to compromise", and "civility". She notes: "Sadly, the political model that [Carp] stood for did not generate as many followers as to form a critical mass that would dominate Romanian political life". Bocancea and Nemoianu also write that, once left vacant, the Conservatives' position was abusively taken up by the far right.

Carp is an incidental presence in various literary works. Very early examples include a fable by Junimea poet Anton Naum (where Carp is Jâgoranu, a variant of Reynard the Fox) and the invectives of poet-journalist N. T. Orășanu. The subject of a similar debate over his Germanophile activities, Constantin Stere gave Carp a fictional portrayal in his 1930s novel În preajma revoluției ("On the Eve of the Revolution"), disguised under the name of T. T. Flor. Eugen Lovinescu (better known as literary historian and liberal theorist) also fictionalized Carp's encounters with Eminescu in the 1934 novel Mite. Outside this realm of literature and satire, Romanian cuisine preserves the statesman's memory in the "Petre Carp Mezelic", an assortment of passerine offal and pork rind.

As noted by Boia, Carp and his wartime attitude were prime targets for historical revisionism. This process began in the 1920s, when popular historian Constantin Kirițescu described Carp, Marghiloman and most other Germanophiles in harsh terms, insisting that their platform was of marginal importance. Such interpretations were opposed by other authors, including the political history essays of Carpist Ioan C. Filitti and the apologetic Carp biography by Constantin Gane (both 1936), while Lovinescu rediscovered Carp the literary figure in his 1932 anthology on "occasional writers". Among the 1930s intellectual youth, some, including Lovinescu disciple Nicolae Steinhardt and political essayist Petre Pandrea, rediscovered Carp as a political and moral guide.

Carp's ideas regarding Russia and the need to defend eastern Romania were again invoked in conjunction with World War II. After the Soviet Union obtained the cession of Bessarabia (1940), it became apparent that, contrary to Carp's advice, Greater Romania had failed to conceive of any long-term strategy for territorial guarantees. This was notably acknowledged in the 1941 book P. P. Carp, critic literar și literat ("P. P. Carp, the Literary Critic and Man of Letters"), by Lovinescu, the former Ententist supporter. Lovinescu noted that Carp's "never with Russia" was prophetic, and that it naturally applied to the spread of Bolshevism.

The Romanian communist regime, installed in 1948, simply dismissed Carp and all his generation as unfrequentable reactionaries, and viewed all sides of World War I as imperialistic. The Carp family was evicted from Țibănești (nationalized in 1949), and some members were forced into internal exile. Beginning in the 1960s, national communism officially adopted a thinly revised version of Kirițescu's stance, viewing Germanophila with a mixture of condemnation and embarrassment. Some new paths to interpreting Carp's policies were only made available after the Romanian Revolution of 1989. Even then, Lucian Boia notes, historians tended to minimize or simply omit references to Carp's support for the Central Powers, which, to them, still contradicts standard patriotism. In tandem with its reevaluation by other scholars, Carp's historical role has been repeatedly invoked by conservative individuals, think tanks and political groups in post-revolutionary Romania. Others additionally assert that Romania's European integration, effected by 2007, implicitly confirmed, re-contextualized and avenged Carp's external policy.

Țibănești hosts two busts in Carp's likeness, respectively donated by rival groups which claim his inspiration: the (post-2005) Conservative Party and the Democratic Party. Founded in 1867, the local primary school was renamed in his honor. Carp's manor, fallen into disrepair by 2008, was refurbished by architect Șerban Sturdza, then turned into a center of learning for traditional handicrafts. Sturdza is a descendant of Elsa Carp-Sturdza, and has successfully sued the state for the property rights. The Dorobanți townhouse, another landmark closely associated with Carp, hosts Turkey's diplomatic mission to Romania.
