= Sinking of the Mogoșoaia =

1989 maritime incident in Romania

Mogoșoaia was a Romanian ferry which sank due to a collision with a convoy of six Bulgarian barges, carrying iron ore, and the pusher ship Petar Karamincev (MMSI: 207261214) on 10 September 1989. Of the 255 people on board only 16 survived. The incident happened when the Mogoșoaia was sailing across the Danube from Galați to Grindu in thick fog.

== Aftermath ==
Gheorghi Petrov Anghelovschi, the commander of the Bulgarian pusher Petar Karamincev, was declared responsible for the disaster and arrested in September 1989. He spent about two months in custody in Romania before being released amid the political upheaval in both countries and returned to Bulgaria, where he served no further time. Romanian courts sentenced him to ten years' imprisonment for culpable destruction, finding that his failure to observe the Danube navigation rules had caused the collision; the sentence became final in 1993 but was never executed.

Civil claims fared little better. The Bulgarian shipowner was ordered to pay damages both to NAVROM Galați, the owner of the Mogoșoaia, and to the victims' families, who in 1993 were awarded sums of between 30,000 and 80,000 lei each — amounts rendered nearly worthless by the rapid devaluation of the Romanian leu. NAVROM subsequently sought to have the damages revalued at 1.12 million US dollars, but the proceedings stalled for years. In 2003 the company attempted to have the Romanian judgment recognized and enforced in Bulgaria before the Sofia Court; the process was repeatedly delayed by procedural demands, and in December 2006 Romania's High Court of Cassation and Justice dismissed a related action as inadmissible. The judgment was never enforced, and no substantive compensation was ever collected.

As of 2026, the Petar Karamincev remained registered in Bulgaria and continued to transmit AIS position data as an active pusher on the Danube.

== See also ==
- List of disasters in Romania by death toll
