= Scânteia train accident =

2009 railway incident in Romania

- Television screenshot of the accident—Antena 3

Details
- Date: August 14, 2009; 14:10 (UTC+3)
- Location: near Railway station in Scânteia, Iași County
- Coordinates: 46.921486°N 27.568517°E
- Country: Romania

Statistics
- Deaths: 14
- Injured: 2

The Scânteia train accident occurred on August 14, 2009, at 14:10 local time (UTC+3), when at least 14 people were killed in a collision between a minibus and a train in Scânteia, Iași County, Romania, on County Road 248C. The death toll was initially reported as 10. It was the worst accident in Romania in fifteen years.

== Accident ==
The location of Iași County in Romania

A minibus carrying 16 people was struck by a train at a railway crossing in Iași County, near the town of Scânteia. According to the Under-Secretary of State for Health, Raed Arafat, 14 people were killed, including the driver and a child, while three others were seriously injured. The minibus, which was hit in the middle, was pushed approximately 350 meters to Scânteia train station.. The train stopped about 350 meters after the impact. Train traffic in the region came to a standstill for a time.

The train involved in the accident was operated by private rail company Regiotrans and ran between Iași and Brașov.

== Victims ==
All of those dead and injured were on the bus; the train passengers were unhurt. According to sources cited, some of the passengers were thrown out the vehicle following the impact, while others remained trapped in the minibus. The bus driver, whose age was variously reported as 21 or 26, and the other injured persons were reported to be in a state of traumatic coma.

== Cause ==
According to the Iași police, the accident occurred because the minibus driver failed to comply with light signals and signs at the railway crossing. The driver died two days later after sustaining fatal injuries.

== See also ==
- List of road accidents 2000–2009
- Valea Lupului minibus train collision
