= Valea Lupului =

- Commune
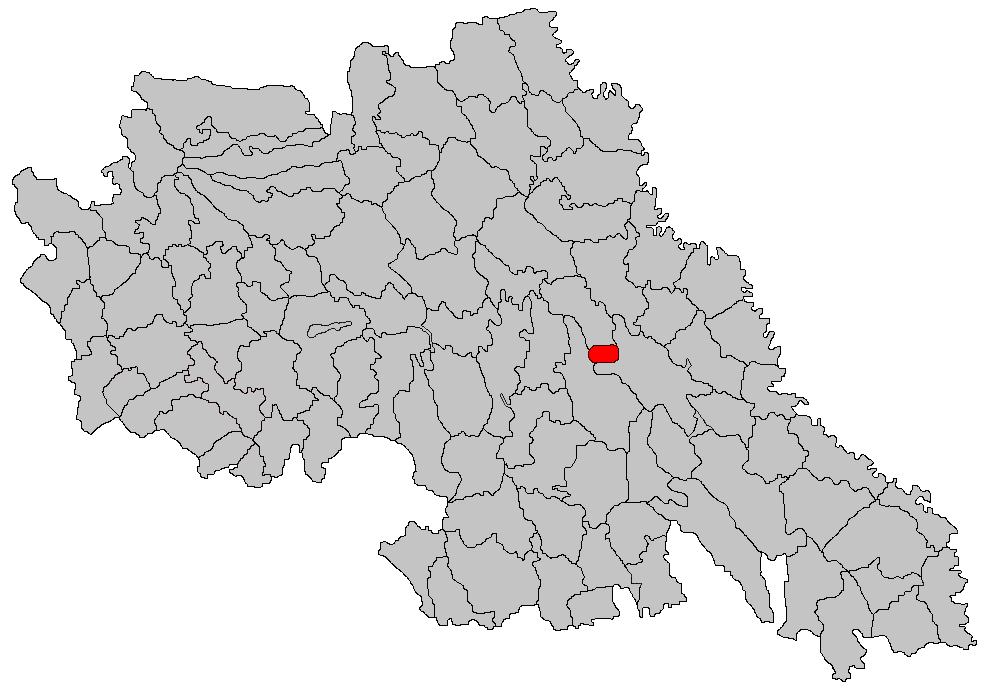
- Location in Iași County

- Location in Romania
- Coordinates: 47°11′N 27°30′E
- Country: Romania
- County: Iași

Government
  - Mayor (2024–2028): Florin-Liviu Dulgheru (PNL)
- Area: 10.63 km^{2} (4.10 sq mi)
- Elevation: 101 m (331 ft)
- Population (2021-12-01): 14,510
  - Density: 1,400/km^{2} (3,500/sq mi)
- Time zone: EET/EEST (UTC+2/+3)
- Postal code: 707410
- Area code: +40 x32
- Vehicle reg.: IS
- Website: comuna-valealupului.ro

Valea Lupului is a commune in Iași County, Western Moldavia, Romania. The commune is composed of a single village, Valea Lupului. It is part of the Iași metropolitan area.

The settlement is located to the north-west of Iași, on the left bank of Bahlui river. The national road DN28 Iași - Roman is at the southern limit.

== See also ==
- Valea Lupului minibus train collision
