= Țibănești =

- Commune
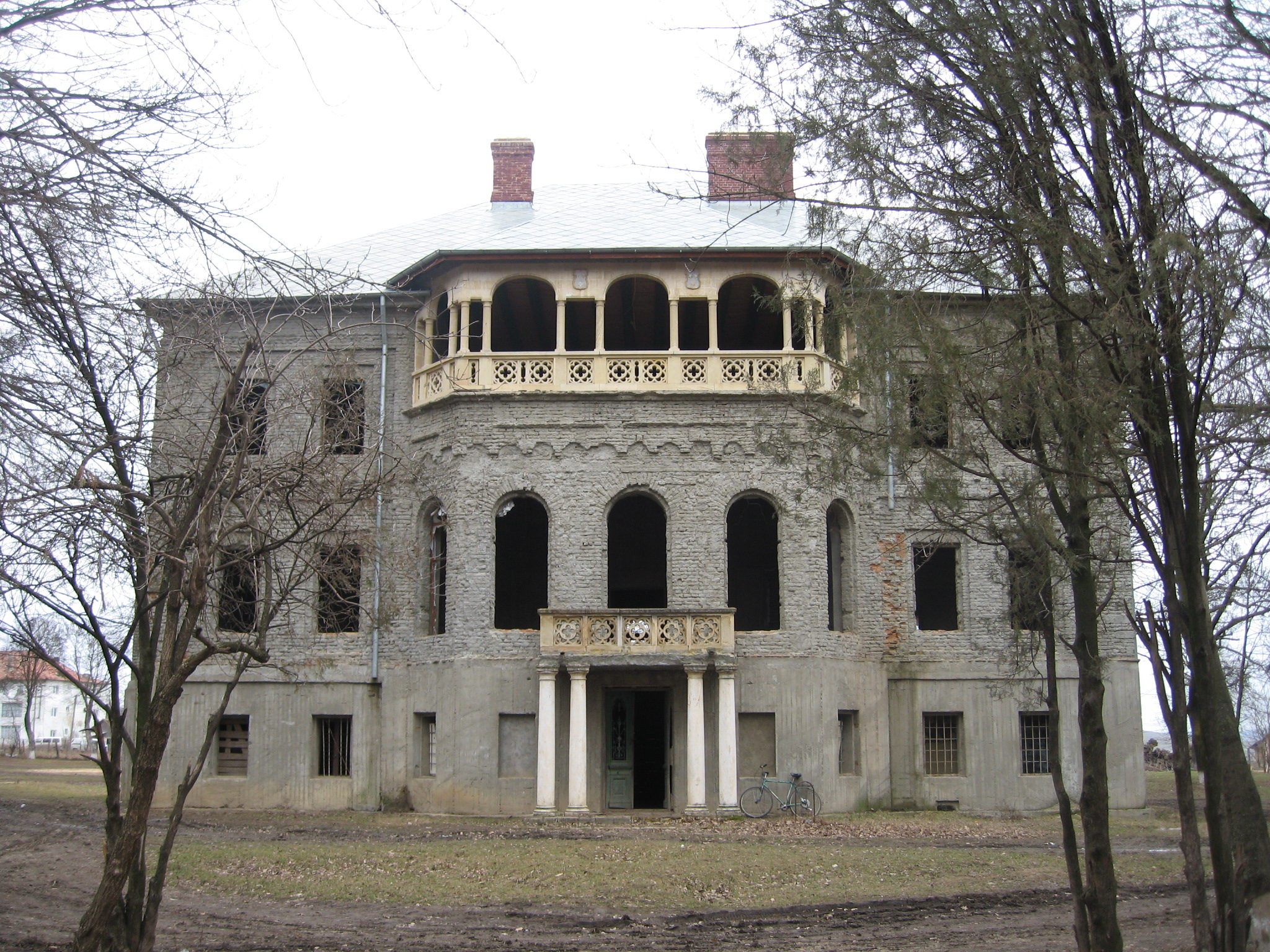
- Petre P. Carp mansion in Țibănești

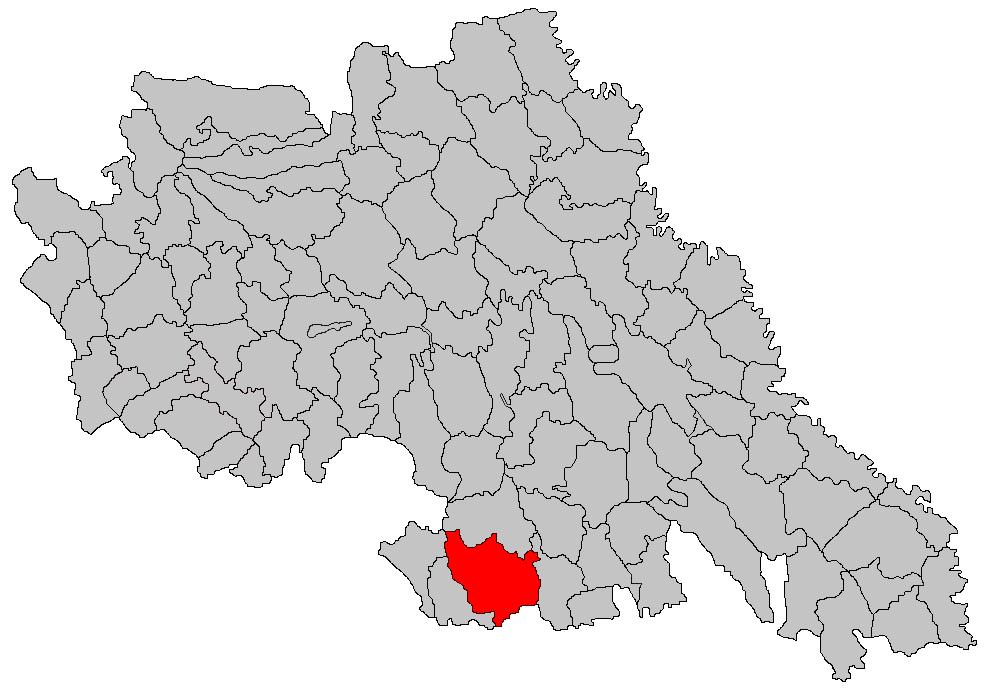
- Location in Iași County

- Location in Romania
- Coordinates: 46.908°N 27.340°E
- Country: Romania
- County: Iași

Government
  - Mayor (2020–2024): Neculai Munteanu (PNL)
- Area: 94.07 km^{2} (36.32 sq mi)
- Elevation: 167 m (548 ft)
- Population (2021-12-01): 6,236
  - Density: 66.29/km^{2} (171.7/sq mi)
- Time zone: UTC+02:00 (EET)
  - Summer (DST): UTC+03:00 (EEST)
- Postal code: 707545
- Area code: +(40) 232
- Vehicle reg.: IS
- Website: primariatibanesti.ro

Țibănești is a commune in Iași County, Western Moldavia, Romania. It is composed of eight villages: Glodenii Gândului, Griești, Jigoreni, Răsboieni, Recea, Țibănești, Tungujei, and Vălenii.

The commune is located in the southern part of Iași County, 46 km (29 mi) southwest of the county seat, Iași, on the border with Vaslui County.
