= Unification of Romania =

The unification of Romania of Romanian unification may refer to the following events:

- The personal union of the principalities of Moldavia, Transylvania and Wallachia under the rule of Michael the Brave of 1600
- The unification of Moldavia and Wallachia following the election of Alexandru Ioan Cuza on both principalities on 1859
- The Great Union, a name given to the series of unifications that Romania made with ethnically Romanian-populated regions (Bessarabia, Bukovina and Transylvania) in 1918 that gave rise to Greater Romania
- The unification of Moldova and Romania, a current proposed unification between Moldova and Romania
