= Oltenia Day =

Romanian holiday celebrated on 21 March

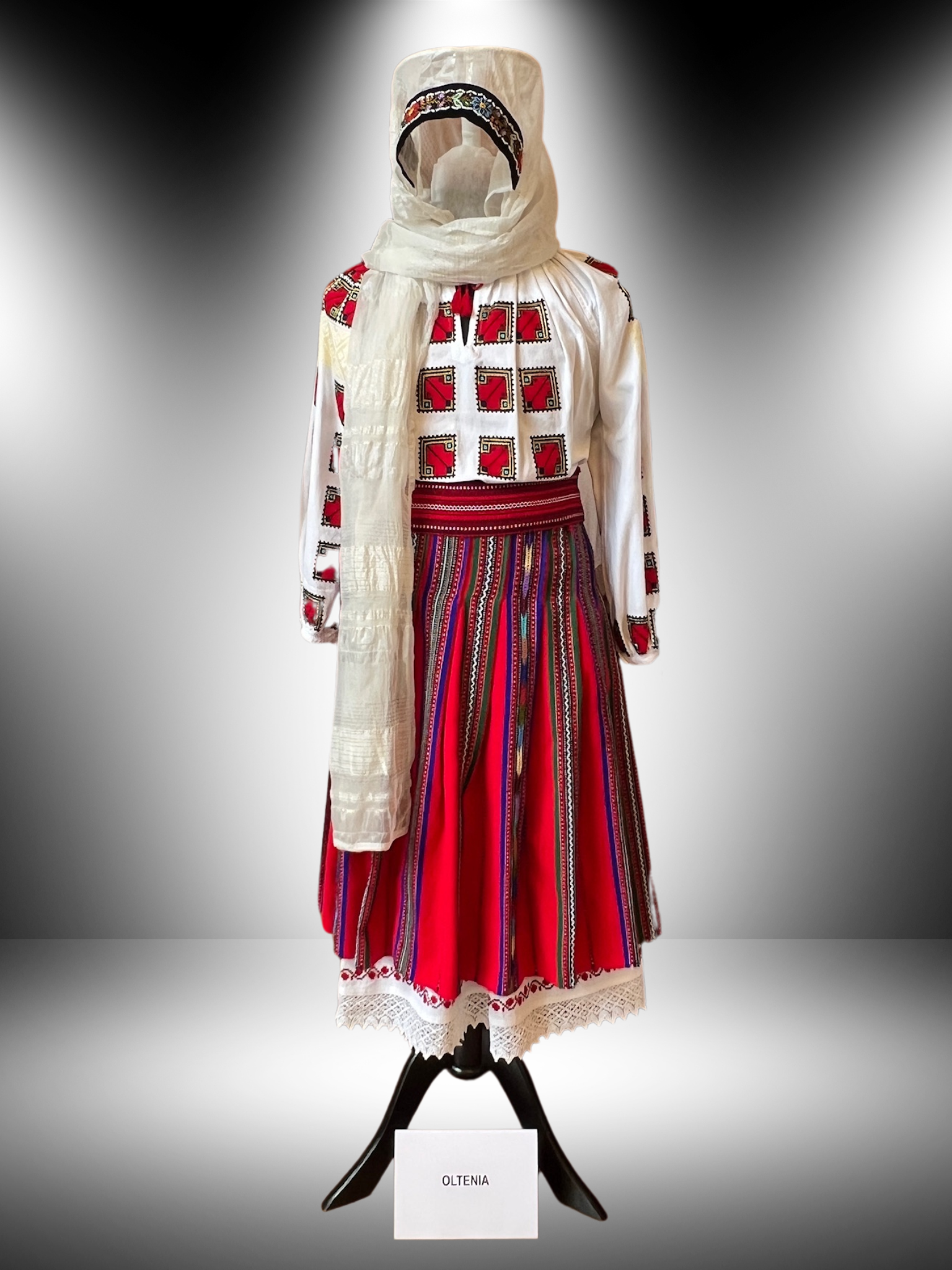
- Folk costume from Oltenia exhibited at Constanța Casino to mark Oltenia Day, 2025
- Observed by: Romania
- Type: Local
- Significance: Anniversary of the entry of the Oltenian Romanian revolutionary Tudor Vladimirescu in Bucharest during the Wallachian uprising of 1821
- Celebrations: Artistic, cultural and scientific events
- Date: 21 March
- Next time: 21 March 2027
- Frequency: annual
- Related to: Great Union Day (1 December)

Oltenia Day (Romanian: Ziua Olteniei) is a holiday of Romania celebrated every 21 March that commemorates the entry into Bucharest on 21 March 1821 of the Romanian revolutionary Tudor Vladimirescu, who started the Wallachian uprising of 1821 in the region of Oltenia, where he was born. The holiday was promulgated on 13 April 2017 by Law No. 65/2017 by the President of Romania Klaus Iohannis and published in the Monitorul Oficial on the same day. Previously, the project to establish the holiday had been approved by the Senate of Romania on 1 November 2016 and by the Chamber of Deputies of Romania on 21 March 2017. The holiday was first proposed by a group of 27 deputies and senators belonging to different Romanian political parties.

According to the law that promulgated the holiday, on Oltenia Day, the central and local authorities and also public cultural institutions are allowed to organize artistic, cultural and scientific events. Furthermore, the Romanian Television Society and the Romanian Radio Broadcasting Company may also include programs related to Oltenia Day.

The day, which is a symbol of pride among the locals, is celebrated in various parts of Oltenia such as Craiova or Târgu Jiu.

== See also ==
- Public holidays in Romania
- Bukovina Day
- Dobruja Day
- Great Union Day
