= Day of the Union of Bessarabia with Romania =

Romanian holiday celebrated on 27 March

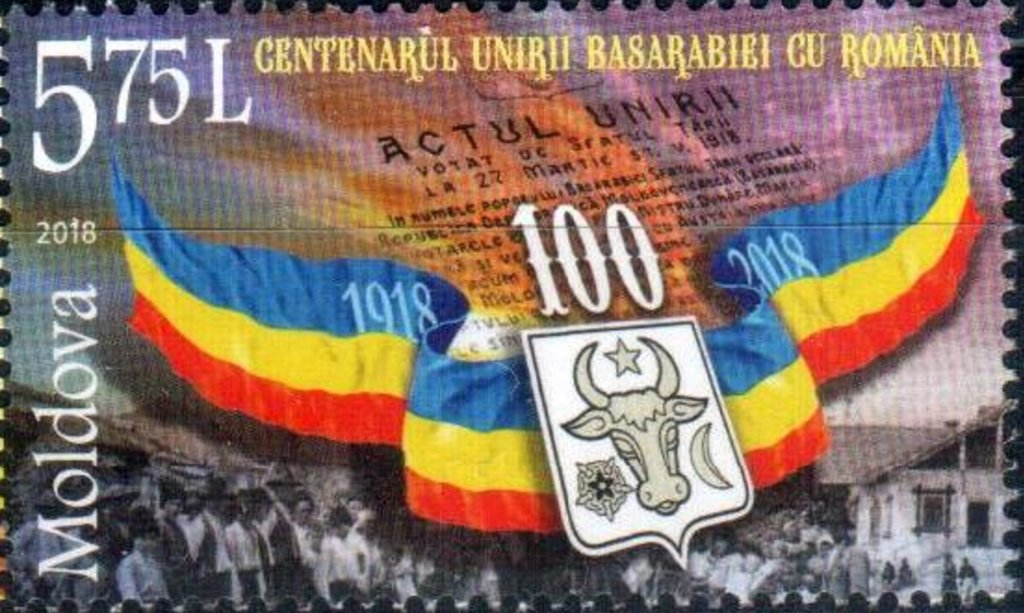
- 2018 Moldovan stamp marking the centenary of the union
- Observed by: Romania, Moldova (unofficially)
- Type: National
- Significance: The union of Bessarabia with Romania in 1918
- Celebrations: Cultural and scientific events and hoisting of the flag of Romania
- Date: 27 March
- Next time: 27 March 2026
- Frequency: annual
- Related to: Great Union Day (1 December)

The Day of the Union of Bessarabia with Romania (Romanian: Ziua Unirii Basarabiei cu România) is a holiday of Romania celebrated every 27 March to commemorate the union of Bessarabia with Romania on 27 March 1918. Bessarabia is a Romanian historical region that was part of the Principality of Moldavia, which united with Wallachia to form modern Romania. The region was annexed in 1812 by the Russian Empire, but it became independent and united with Romania on 27 March 1918.

Eventually, in 1940, Romania lost Bessarabia to the Soviet Union (USSR), regaining it in 1941 but losing it once again in 1944. The USSR established in part of Bessarabia the Moldavian SSR, which achieved independence in 1991 as the Republic of Moldova, developing since then a movement for unification with Romania. Today, the Day of the Union of Bessarabia with Romania is celebrated in Romania, where it has been an official holiday since 2017, and in Moldova, including the legally Moldovan breakaway territory of Transnistria.

== Background ==
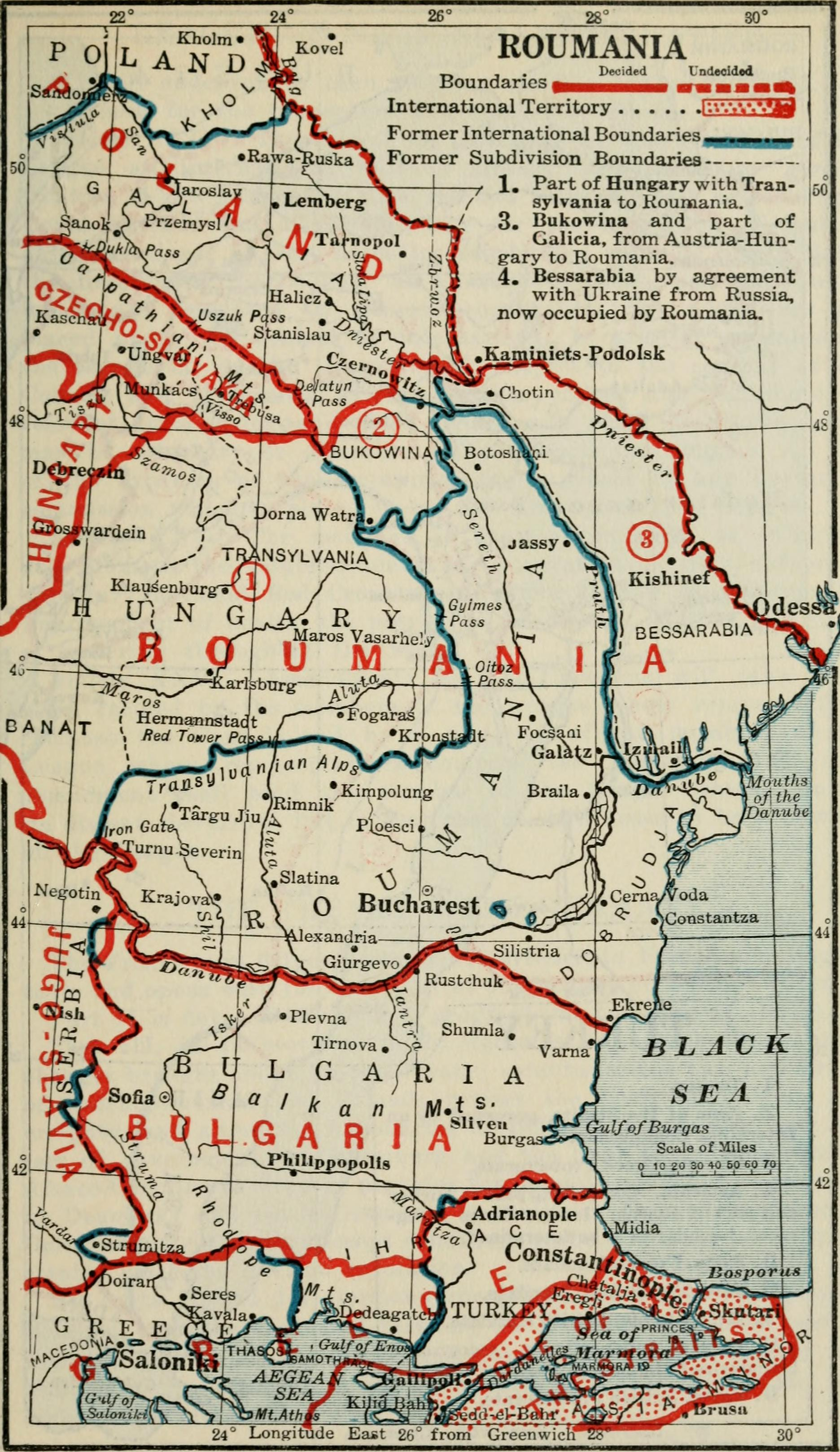
Romania in 1919, with Bessarabia marked as (3)

Bessarabia is a region between the Prut and Dniester rivers that the Russian Empire annexed from the Principality of Moldavia in 1812. This led to a process of Russification and colonization of the province, which severely reduced the Romanian population of the region. In 1859, Moldavia united with Wallachia, forming the modern state of Romania. The beginning of the 1917 Russian Revolution allowed Bessarabia to declare itself as independent, forming the Moldavian Democratic Republic while World War I was taking place. On 27 March 1918, this state united with Romania, this being the reason for the commemorated date. Romania lost control of Bessarabia and also of Northern Bukovina after the occupation of these territories by the Soviet Union (USSR) in 1940, with Romania regaining them briefly in 1941 but losing them again in 1944.

Under Soviet rule, Bessarabia was divided into different parts. The northern and southern parts, as well as the entirety of Northern Bukovina, were given to the Ukrainian SSR, whereas the Moldavian SSR was established in the remaining part of the region. At the same time, some territories at the other side of the Dniester, which today form Transnistria, were attached to the Moldavian SSR. The Moldavian SSR became independent in 1991 as the Republic of Moldova, which later lost control of Transnistria following the Transnistria War. Since the independence of Moldova, there has been a unification movement to unite the country with Romania.

== History ==
=== Romania ===
The Day of the Union of Bessarabia with Romania was unanimously adopted by the Senate of Romania on 13 October 2015, with 79 votes in favor. Two years later, it was adopted by the Chamber of Deputies of Romania on 14 March 2017 with 260 votes in favor, 1 against and 6 abstentions. The person who started this project, Eugen Tomac, then deputy of the People's Movement Party (PMP), argued that "forgetting history is the same as betrayal". The holiday became official in Romania after President Klaus Iohannis promulgated it on 27 March 2017.

According to the law that passed the holiday, Law no. 36/2017, which was published on the Monitorul Oficial on 29 March 2017 and entered into force on 1 April 2017, central and local authorities, non-governmental organizations, museums and representations of Romania abroad can organize cultural and scientific events related to the holiday on this day. They are also free to help with materials and logistically support these events. Furthermore, the Romanian flag is flown on this day.

On 27 March 2018, on the centenary of the unification of Bessarabia with Romania, Iohannis sent a message talking about the importance of this past event and that it represents a source of inspiration to develop and deepen the relations between Romania and Moldova and the European integration of the latter, which Romania actively supports. Later, in 2021, George Simion, leader of the Alliance for the Union of Romanians (AUR), announced that the party would begin operating in Moldova on the occasion of the Day of the Union of Bessarabia with Romania.

=== Moldova ===
In 2020, the Union Political Movement (MPU), a Moldovan unionist bloc of parties, proposed to establish in Moldova a holiday similar to the Day of the Union of Bessarabia with Romania, but this idea was rejected. However, it is celebrated anyway by some Moldovan supporters of the unification with Romania. For example, in 2018, thousands of people demonstrated in Chișinău, the Moldovan capital, to celebrate the centenary of the 1918 union and demand a new one with Romania. A year earlier, the Romanian Cultural Institute (ICR) had organized various events and spectacles in Moldova on this day.

Celebrations of this kind have also occurred in Transnistria. In 2017, the Lucian Blaga High School in Tiraspol organized events in which teachers and students sang and recited Romanian patriotic songs and poems and placed a huge Romanian flag in the hallways of the building.

== See also ==
- Public holidays in Romania
- Public holidays in Moldova
- "Bessarabia, Romanian land"
- Great Union Day
