= Day of the Unification of the Romanian Principalities =

Annual public holiday of Romania

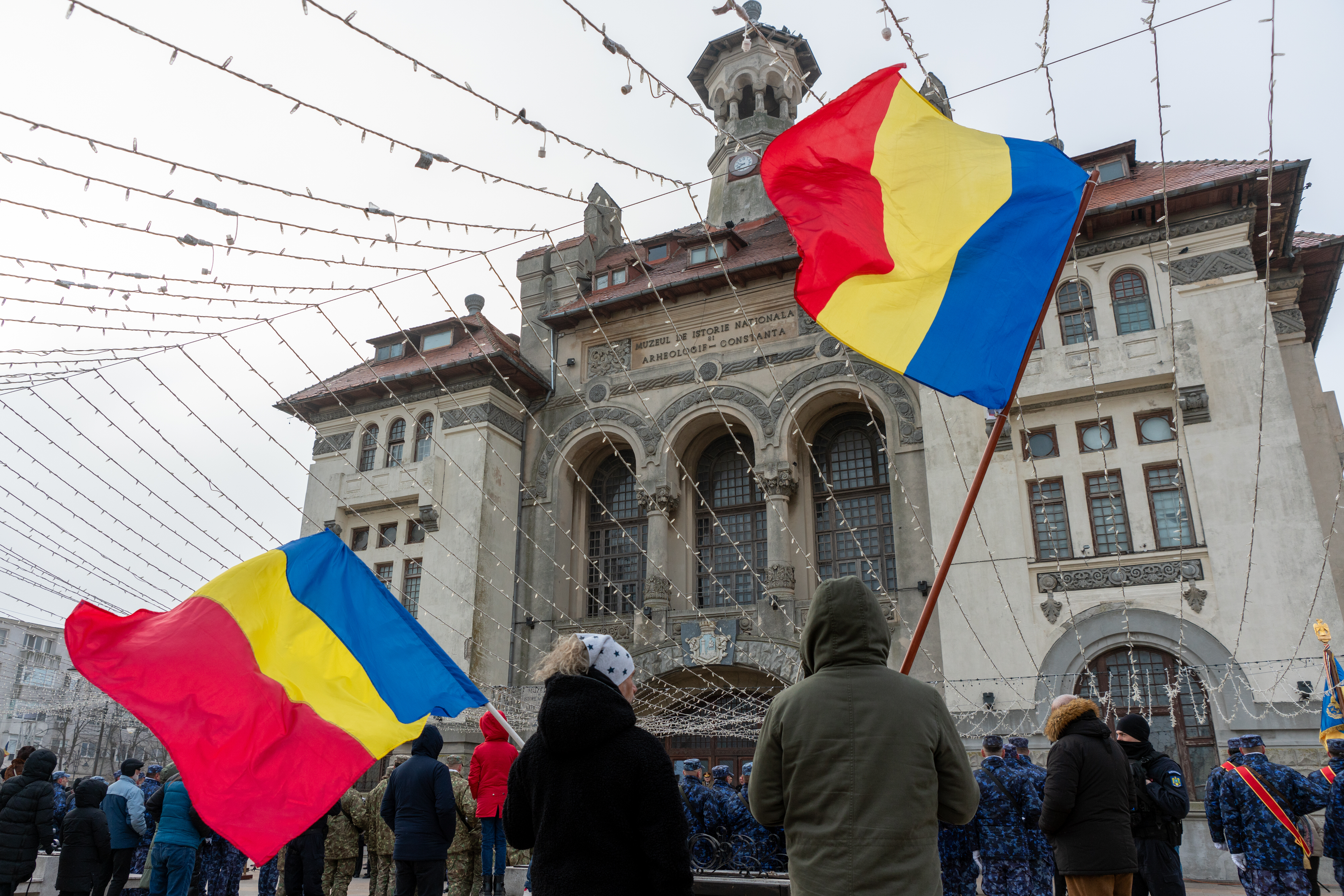
- Celebration of the Little Union Day in Constanța in 2024
- Observed by: Romania; Moldova (unofficially)
- Type: National
- Significance: The unification of the Romanian Principalities (Moldavia and Wallachia), which led to the establishment of modern Romania
- Celebrations: Artistic and cultural events
- Date: 24 January
- Next time: 24 January 2027
- Frequency: Annual
- Related to: Great Union Day (1 December)

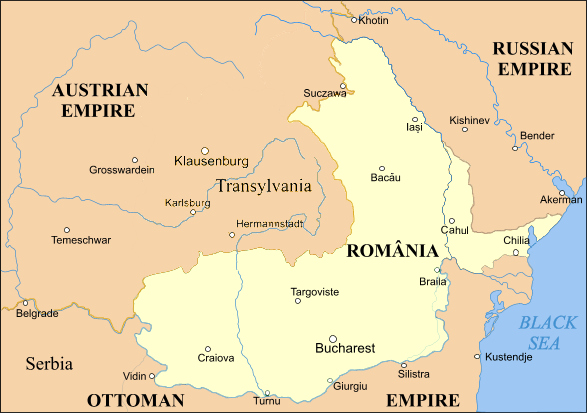
Map of the resulting Romanian state following the unification of Moldavia and Wallachia in 1859

The Day of the Unification of the Romanian Principalities (Romanian: Ziua Unirii Principatelor Române) or, unofficially, the Little Union Day (Romanian: Ziua Micii Uniri), is a public holiday of Romania celebrated every 24 January to commemorate the unification of the Romanian Principalities (Moldavia and Wallachia), also known as the "Little Union", on 24 January 1859 under prince Alexandru Ioan Cuza. This event is deemed as important as it is considered the first step towards the goal of achieving a unitary Romanian state, something that is considered to have been achieved on 1 December 1918, when the Romanian National Assembly declared the union of Transylvania, Banat, Crișana, and Maramureș with the Kingdom of Romania.

The Day of the Unification of the Romanian Principalities was first adopted by the Senate on 2 June 2014 and later by the Chamber of Deputies on 3 December of the same year. The holiday became official when a few days later Romanian President Traian Băsescu signed a decree promulgating it on 16 December. Thus, Law No. 171/2014 dictates that, on 24 January, central and local authorities can provide material and logistical support to artistic and cultural events dedicated to this day. Since 2016, the observance is a non-working day in Romania.

The Day of the Unification of the Romanian Principalities is also celebrated in Moldova.

== See also ==
- Public holidays in Romania
- Great Union Day
