= Public holidays in Romania =

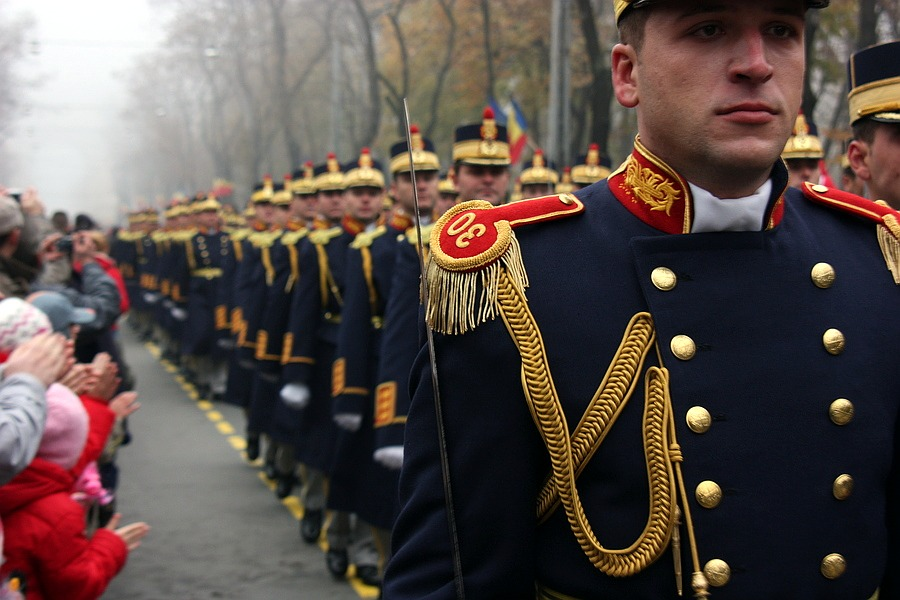
Soldiers on a parade during the National Day of Romania, 1 December 2008

The following is a list of public holidays in Romania. According to Romanian law, Romania had 51 public holidays as of 2011, which cover 14% of the days of the year in the country from which 15 days are non-working. In 2025, Romania had 17 public non-working holidays

== Official non-working holidays ==
Date	Romanian name	English name	Remarks
1-2 January	Anul Nou	New Year's Day	
6 January	Boboteaza	Epiphany	
7 January	Sfântul Ioan Botezătorul	John the Baptist	
24 January	Ziua Unirii Principatelor Române	Day of the Unification of the Romanian Principalities	Celebrates unification of the Romanian Principalities of Moldavia and Wallachia in 1859 and the foundation of the Romanian modern state. A non-working day since 2016.
1 May	Ziua Muncii	Labour Day	International Labour Day
April/May	Paștele	Good Friday, Easter, Easter Monday	The official holiday is the Orthodox Easter. The holiday is three days long, Good Friday, Easter Sunday and Easter Monday are non-working. Easter Sunday is 5 May 2024, 20 April 2025, 12 April 2026, 2 May 2027.
1 June	Ziua Copilului	Children's Day	Public holiday starting with 2017
May/June	Rusaliile	Pentecost, Pentecost Monday	The 50th and 51st day from Orthodox Easter. Pentecost is 23 June 2024, 8 June 2025, 31 May 2026, 20 June 2027.
15 August	Adormirea Maicii Domnului/Sfânta Maria Mare	Dormition of the Mother of God	Also the Day of the Romanian Naval Forces since St. Mary is the patroness saint of the Navy.
30 November	Sfântul Andrei	Saint Andrew's Day	Saint Andrew is the patron saint of Romania.
1 December	Ziua Națională a României	National Day of Romania	It celebrates the unification of Transylvania, Bessarabia and Bukovina with the Kingdom of Romania.
25-26 December	Crăciunul	Christmas Day	Both first and second Christmas Day are holidays.

== Other working holidays and observances ==
Date	Name	Remarks
15 January	National Culture Day	Celebration of the birth of the Romanian poet Mihai Eminescu.
27 January	International Holocaust Remembrance Day	
19 February	Brâncuși Day	Not a public holiday
20 February	World Day of Social Justice	
8 March	Women's Day	Observes International Women's Day
9 March	Anti-Communist Political Prisoners' Day	
20 March	International Francophonie Day and International Day of Happiness	
21 March	International Day for the Elimination of Racial Discrimination, World Down Syndrome Day, International Day for the Eradication of Poverty and Oltenia Day	
22 March	World Water Day	
24 March	World Tuberculosis Day	
25 March	Romanian Police Day and International Day for the Remembrance of the Slave Trade and its Abolition	
27 March	Day of the Union of Bessarabia with Romania	Celebrates the Union of Bessarabia with Romania.
Last or second-to-last Saturday in March	Earth Hour	Not a public holiday. The last Saturday in March except Earth Hour is held a week earlier when Holy Saturday falls on the last Saturday in March.
First Sunday in April	NATO Day	Not a public holiday – observed by the Government institutions. 7 April 2024, 6 April 2025, 5 April 2026, 4 April 2027.
2 April	World Autism Awareness Day	
3 April	Romanian Gendarmerie Day	
7 April	World Health Day	
8 April	Day of the Romani Ethnicity of Romania	
22 April	Earth Day	Not a public holiday
23 April	Railway Day, Librarian Day, World Book Day, National Day of the Romanian Tax Consultant	
29 April	War Veterans' Day	
First Sunday in May	Mother's Day	5 May 2024, 4 May 2025, 3 May 2026, 2 May 2027,
Second Sunday in May	Father's Day, Teenager's Day and National Dress Day	12 May 2024, 11 May 2025, 10 May 2026, 9 May 2027.
2 May	National Youth Day	
3 May	World Press Freedom Day	
5 May	Day of the Tatar Language	
8 May	Equality of Opportunities Between Women and Men Day	
9 May	Independence Day, Victory Day and Europe Day	It celebrates Romania's proclamation of independence during the war against the Ottoman Empire in 1877–1878, concluded with the recognition of Romania's independence. Romania celebrates the capitulation of Nazi Germany in 1945. Also, starting 2007, Romania observes Europe Day.
10 May	Monarchy Day, Balkan Romanianness Day	The first celebrates the crowning of Carol I as its first king, as well as all the kings of the Romanian monarchy.
14 May	International Humanitarian Rights Day	
15 May	National Veterinary Day and International Day of Families	
21 May	World Day for Cultural Diversity for Dialogue and Development	
24 May	Bulgarian Language Day	
25 May	Slovak Language Day	
27 May	Mihai Viteazul Day	In 1600, Michael the Brave briefly unified Wallachia, Transylvania and Moldavia under his rule.
31 May	Military Reserves Day	
Last Sunday in May	Day of the Romanians Everywhere, Romanian Businessperson Day	26 May 2024, 25 May 2025, 31 May 2026, 30 May 2027.
May/June	Heroes' Day/Ascension	The 40th day from the Orthodox Easter. Not a public holiday – observed with military and religious festivities at the monuments dedicated to the national heroes (such as the Tomb of the Unknown Soldier). 13 June 2024, 29 May 2025, 21 May 2026, 10 June 2027.
1 June	Parents' Day	
2 June	National Adoption Day	
4 June	International Day of Innocent Children Victims of Aggression and Trianon Treaty Day.	
5 June	National Day Against Child Abuse and World Environment Day	
11 June	Day of Romanian Democracy	Commemorates the Wallachian revolution of 1848.
14 June	World Blood Donor Day	
26 June	National Flag Day, International Day in Support of Victims of Torture and International Day Against Drug Abuse and Illicit Trafficking	
First Sunday in July	Justice Day	7 July 2024, 6 July 2025, 5 July 2026, 4 July 2027.
Second Sunday in July	Statistician Day	14 July 2024, 13 July 2025, 12 July 2026, 11 July 2027.
20 July	Romanian Aviation and Air Force Day	
24 July	Romanian Border Police Day	
28 July	National Ambulance Day and World Hepatitis Day	
29 July	National Anthem Day	Date when Deșteaptă-te, române! was first performed, in 1848 at Râmnicu Vâlcea – not a public holiday
30 July	Friendship Day	
15 August	Navy Day	
23 August	Liberation from Fascist Occupation Day and Day of Remembrance of the Victims of Fascism and Communism	National holiday between 1949 and 1990. On 23 August 1944, King Michael I joined with pro-Allied opposition politicians and led a successful coup against Conducător of Romania, Marshal Ion Antonescu's fascist government. Romania joins the Allies and participates alongside the Red Army in further operations in countries under Nazi occupation. Since 2011, Romania observes the European Day for Commemoration of the Victims of Totalitarian and Authoritarian regimes, also as a reminder of the Molotov–Ribbentrop pact signed on this day in 1939 – which resulted in Romania losing most of the region that is now Moldova and parts of Ukraine (see Soviet occupation of Bessarabia and Northern Bukovina).
31 August	Romanian Language Day	
1 September	Danube Delta Biosphere Reserve Day	
10 September	World Suicide Prevention Day	
13 September	Firefighters of Romania's Day	
14 September	Romanian Engineer's Day	
15 September	International Day of Democracy	
21 September	International Day of Peace	
28 September	Czech Language Day	
29 September	World Heart Day	
1 October	International Day of Older Persons and Romanian Diver's Day	
5 October	World Teachers' Day	
9 October	World Post Day	
10 October	World Mental Health Day	
11 October	Transylvanian Schools Day	
17 October	International Day for the Eradication of Poverty	
24 October	United Nations Day	
25 October	Armed Forces Day	Not a public holiday. Observed by the Romanian Army and its veterans on the anniversary of the liberation of Carei, the last Romanian city under horthyst-fascist occupation during World War II. Also the birthday of King Michael I
11 November	Veterans Day	
14 November	Dobruja Day and World Diabetes Day	Date which celebrates the integration of Northern Dobruja into Romania in 1878.
16 November	International Day for Tolerance and Romanian World Heritage Day	
19 November	Men's Day and Romanian Researcher and Designer Day	Observes men's day
28 November	Bukovina Day	Date which celebrates the Union of Bukovina with Romania in 1918.
Third Thursday of November	National Day Without Tobacco	21 November 2024, 20 November 2025, 19 November 2026, 18 November 2027.
Third Sunday of November	World Day of Remembrance for Road Traffic Victims	17 November 2024, 16 November 2025, 15 November 2026, 21 November 2027.
1 December	World AIDS Day	
2 December	International Day for the Abolition of Slavery	
3 December	United Nations' International Day of Persons with Disabilities	
8 December	Constitution Day	Date when the referendum on the Romanian Constitution was held in 1991 thus establishing the first democratic republic.
9 December	International Anti-Corruption Day	
10 December	Human Rights Day	
13 December	Day of the Tatar Ethnicity of Romania	
16 December	National Solidarity Day Against Dictatorship	
18 December	Day of the National Minorities of Romania	
20 December	International Human Solidarity Day	
21 December	Day of Remembrance of the Victims of Communism in Romania	Marks the peak of the victorious Romanian Revolution of 1989 and commemorates the victims who fell in the violent street confrontations between 16 and 27 December.
22 December	Romanian Revolution Victory and Freedom Day	

== Traditional holidays – working observances ==
Date	Name	Remarks
24 February	Dragobetele	Similar to St. Valentine's Day
1 March	Mărțișorul	Spring festival

== See also ==
- Public holidays in Moldova
- Public holidays in Transnistria
