= 1918 Great National Assembly election =

Elections for 680 of the 1,228 delegates to the Great National Assembly of Alba Iulia took place in Transylvania and neighbouring regions of the Hungarian Democratic Republic inhabited by Romanians between November 20 and December 1, 1918. Called by the National Romanian Central Council, the elections were open exclusively to ethnic Romanians, with women excluded from the process in most of the places. Voting procedure was highly irregular, ranging from universal vote direct vote to indirect elections and even acclamation by local self-proclaimed "Romanian national councils".

== History ==
- 13–15 November 1918 - Negotiations are held in Arad between the Hungarian government of Károlyi Mihály and the National Romanian Central Council, without reaching any agreement. News about the armistice of Belgrade reach the Romanian (Transylvanian) delegation. The National Romanian Central Council retreats from negotiations and decides to hold elections and convey for 1 December [O.S. 18 November ] 1918 the Great National Assembly, and to hand power to the latter.
- November 1918 - During a 12-day interval, elections are held for the Great National Assembly. Its 1,228 members are elected 5 each from the electoral districts established in 1910 (600 members in total), and 628 to represent different social, professional and cultural organizations (clergy, teachers' unions, military). The local enthusiasm gains momentum, as demands such as land reform, universal vote, and possible union with Romania are put forward.
- On 1 December 1918 (18 November Old Style), the Great National Assembly, consisting of 1,228 elected representatives of the Romanians in Transylvania, Banat, Crișana and Maramureș, convened in Alba Iulia (Gyulafehérvár) and decreed (by unanimous vote) the Union of Transylvania with Romania
- On 2 December 1918 the High National Romanian Council of Transylvania formed a government under the name of Directing Council of Transylvania, Banat and the Romanian Lands in Hungary, headed by Iuliu Maniu.

== See also ==
- 1917 Bessarabian legislative election
