= Trianon Treaty Day =

Romanian holiday

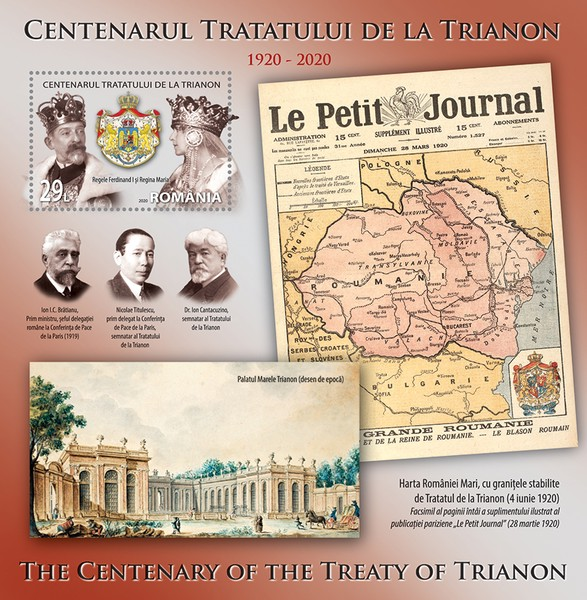
- 2020 Romanian stamp commemorating the centenary of the Treaty of Trianon
- Observed by: Romania
- Type: National
- Celebrations: Cultural, educational, and scientific events
- Date: 4 June
- Next time: 4 June 2026
- Frequency: annual

The Trianon Treaty Day (Romanian: Ziua Tratatului de la Trianon) is a holiday in Romania celebrated every 4 June to commemorate the signing of the Treaty of Trianon in 1920. The holiday was first proposed in 2015 by the Romanian politician Titus Corlățean and subsequently promulgated on 18 November 2020 by President Klaus Iohannis.

== Background ==
After the collapse of Austria-Hungary at the end of World War I, the Romanian Army took control of Transylvania starting from November 1918 as the Hungarian–Romanian War was ongoing.

The Romanian National Assembly proclaimed the Union of Transylvania with Romania on 1 December 1918. In the assembly, 1,228 delegates present declared their intention for Transylvania, the Körös region, the Banat, and Máramaros – altogether 26 historic counties of the Kingdom of Hungary – to unite with the Kingdom of Romania. Although the decision of Romanians was the result of a unilateral resolution, it completely deprived the Hungarians along with the other ethnic groups of Transylvania of their right to self-determination. The Székelys at the end of November, and the Hungarians of Kolozsvár (now Cluj-Napoca) made also an assembly on 2 December and declared that they did not wish to belong to Romania, despite the Romanian occupation continued as far as Western Hungary.

The Treaty of Trianon was a treaty signed on 4 June 1920 between Hungary and the Allies (including Romania). As a result, Transylvania, as well as parts of Banat, Crișana and Maramureș, were officially allocated to Romania. Hungary also lost territories to Austria, Czechoslovakia, the Kingdom of Serbs, Croats and Slovenes and Poland as a consequence of it. The Treaty of Trianon drew a border that placed about 1,658,045 Hungarians under Romanian rule, although the territory granted was smaller than what Romania had originally demanded.

== Holiday ==
According to the law that promulgated the holiday, on Trianon Treaty Day, cultural, educational, and scientific events of both local and national level can be held to raise awareness of the treaty and its significance and importance. Civilians, as well as organizations and local or central authorities can support such events through material and logistical support. Romanian Television and the Romanian Radio Broadcasting Company are permitted to broadcast programs related to the observance. In 2022, on the occasion of the Trianon Treaty Day, Giuseppe Nicolini's opera Traiano in Dacia had its debut in Romania at the Romanian National Opera, Cluj-Napoca.

== Response ==
The holiday has elicited negative responses from the Hungarian community of Romania and Hungary itself. It has been claimed that the Romanian decision for promulgating the holiday was because of the earlier establishment of 4 June in Hungary as the "Day of National Unity" and to endorse anti-Hungarian sentiments. On the other hand, Corlățean, who proposed the law passed by the Parliament of Romania, declared to BBC News: "I do not understand why the Romanians should be shy of marking what was fundamental for their history, because we don't want to offend anyone".

== See also ==
- Public holidays in Romania
- Hungary–Romania relations
