= Dobruja Day =

Romanian holiday celebrated on 14 November

- Observed by: Romania
- Type: Local
- Significance: Anniversary of the incorporation of Northern Dobruja into the Kingdom of Romania
- Celebrations: Cultural and scientific events
- Date: 14 November
- Next time: 14 November 2025
- Frequency: annual
- Related to: Romanian Independence Day (9 May), Great Union Day (1 December)

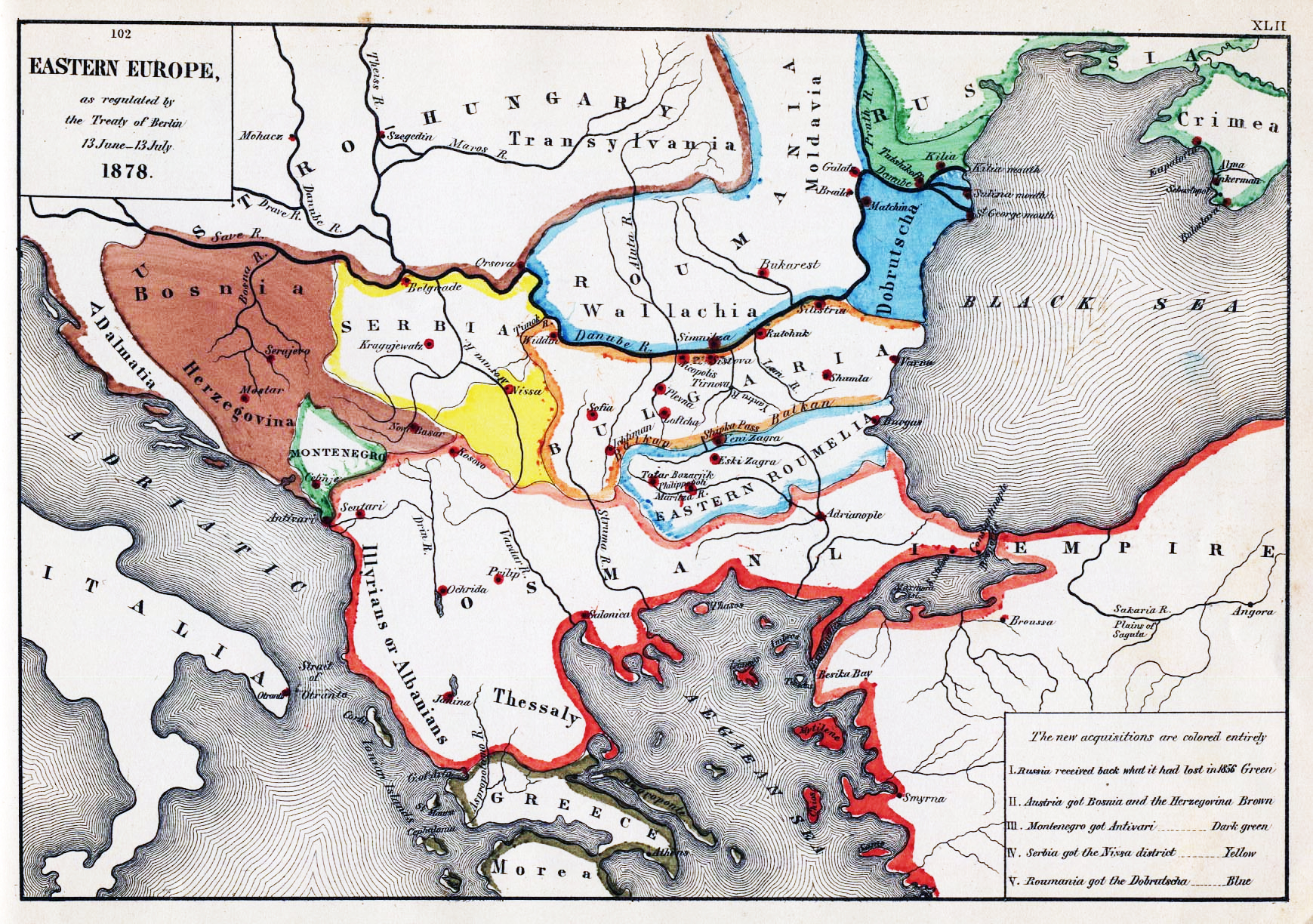
Map of the consequences of the Treaty of Berlin of 1878, whereby the blue area (Northern Dobruja) was given to Romania

Dobruja Day (Romanian: Ziua Dobrogei) is a holiday of Romania celebrated every 14 November that commemorates the incorporation of the region of Northern Dobruja into Romania on 14 November 1878.

== Background ==
The Principality of Romania gained Northern Dobruja (including the Danube Delta and the Snake Island) in 1878 after defeating the Ottoman Empire together with Russia in the Russo-Turkish War of 1877–1878. This territory was given by Russia as an "exchange" or "compensation" for the annexation by the latter of the Romanian region of Southern Bessarabia. Romania later conquered Southern Dobruja as well in 1913 after a war against Bulgaria, then lost the whole Dobruja (except for the Danube Delta) during World War I after the Treaty of Bucharest of 1918, regained it a year later after the Treaty of Neuilly-sur-Seine, and eventually lost Southern Dobruja after the Treaty of Craiova on 7 September 1940, this being followed by a population exchange with Bulgaria.

== Holiday proposal ==
The holiday was proposed by 27 Romanian deputies and senators, who explained that the integration of Northern Dobruja together with the unification of the Romanian principalities under the Prince Alexandru Ioan Cuza marked "the beginning of the Great Union" and that they were a first step for "the recognition of Romania as a state by the European powers" and "the foundation of the modern Romanian state".

The proposal was adopted on 19 November 2013 by the Senate and on 9 September 2015 by the Chamber of Deputies. Finally, Law No. 230/2015 on the establishment of the holiday was published by the Monitorul Oficial on 7 October 2015. According to this law, local and central authorities, as well as public cultural institutions in the country and abroad, are allowed to organize scientific and cultural programs and events. Authorities of the central and local public administration can aid materially and logistically the events organized on this day and the Romanian Radio Broadcasting Company and the Romanian Television can transmit cultural programs and broadcasts about Dobruja Day.

== Observance ==
The day is celebrated by the local authorities and population of various Dobrujan cities, towns and villages such as Constanța, Tulcea, Mangalia, Medgidia, Mamaia, Cernavodă, Năvodari and Sulina. Dobruja Day is also celebrated by local Bulgarians and Lipovans.

== See also ==
- Public holidays in Romania
- Bukovina Day
- Oltenia Day
- Great Union Day
- Romanians in Bulgaria
