= Bukovina Day =

Romanian holiday celebrated on 28 November

- Observed by: Romania, Romanians in Ukraine
- Type: Local
- Significance: Anniversary of the unification of Bukovina with the Kingdom of Romania
- Celebrations: Cultural and scientific events
- Date: 28 November
- Next time: 28 November 2026
- Frequency: annual
- Related to: Great Union Day (1 December)

Bukovina Day (Romanian: Ziua Bucovinei) is a holiday of Romania celebrated every 28 November that commemorates the decision of the General Congress of Bukovina to unite the region of Bukovina with the Kingdom of Romania on 28 November 1918.

== Background ==
Bukovina had belonged to the Romanian principality of Moldavia until 1774, when it was occupied by the Habsburg monarchy. It would not be until 1918 when the region would join Romania, but in 1940, Northern Bukovina, together with Bessarabia, was forcibly ceded to the Soviet Union.

== Holiday proposal ==
The day was promulgated as a holiday by Law No. 250/2015 by the President of Romania, Klaus Iohannis, on 28 October 2015. The Senate of Romania had already accepted the proposal on 2 October 2013, while the Chamber of Deputies approved it only on 7 October 2015. The proposal was initiated by the deputy Alexandru Băișanu.

== Observance ==
During Bukovina Day, local authorities and public institutions, who may be given a budget, are allowed to organize cultural and scientific events.

The day is celebrated by the local authorities and population of various cities, towns and villages mostly in the Romanian part of Bukovina, such as Rădăuți, Suceava, Putna Vatra Dornei, and Câmpulung Moldovenesc, as well as by Romanians in Chernivtsi, in Northern Bukovina, the Ukrainian part of the region. The day is also celebrated in other parts of Romania; in 2019, the city of Bacău organized a cultural event together with ethnic Romanian teachers and students from Northern Bukovina.

On 28 November 2019, the Prime Minister of Romania Ludovic Orban announced that a project of more than 240 million euros would be approved to improve the infrastructure of Suceava County. This was interpreted as a gift from the Romanian Government for Bukovina Day.

== See also ==
- Public holidays in Romania
- Dobruja Day
- Oltenia Day
- Great Union Day
- Romanians in Ukraine
