= Constanța Casino =

Heritage site in Constanța County, Romania

- Cazinoul din Constanța
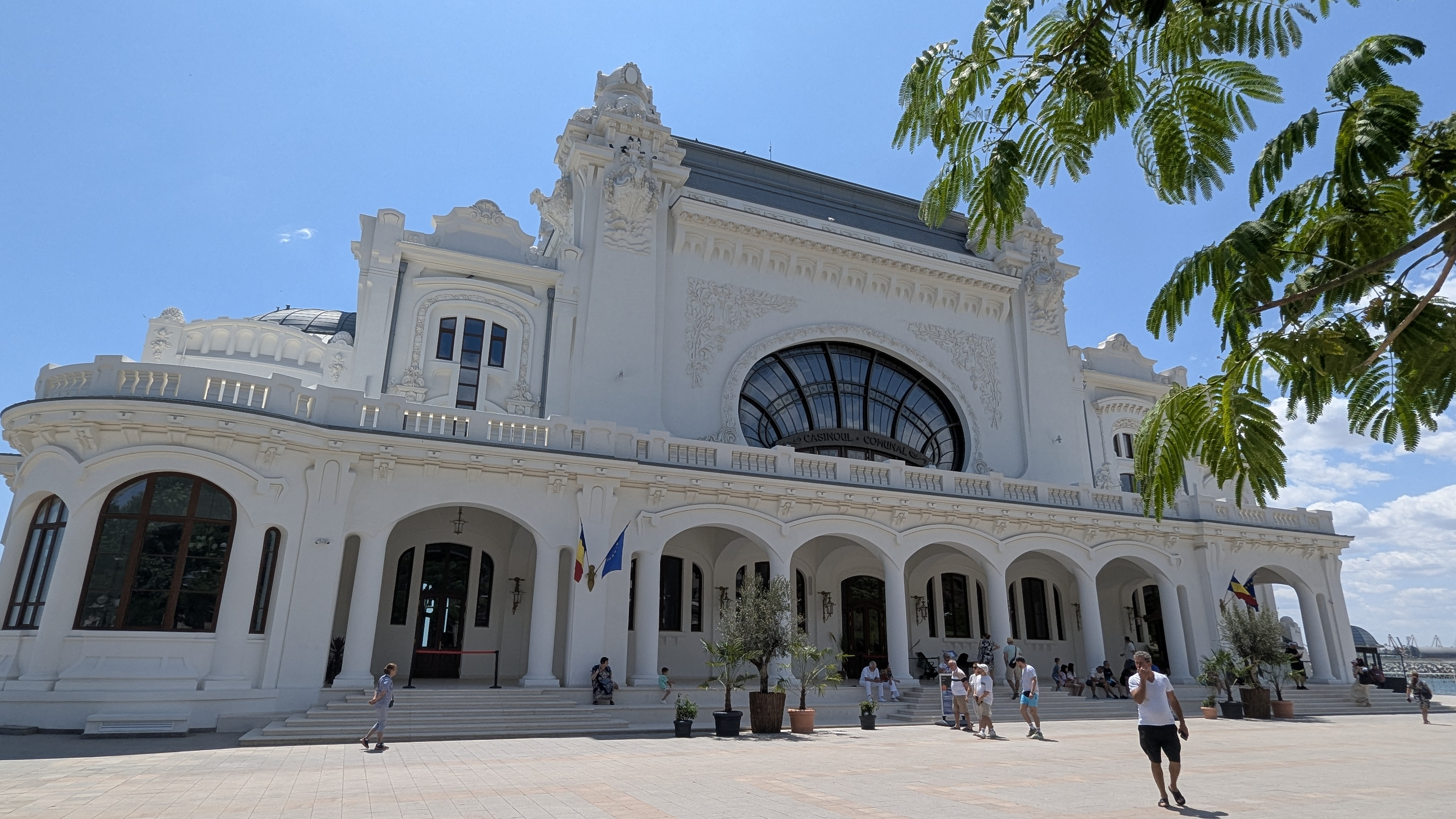
- The casino in 2025, after its restoration
- Interactive map of the Constanța Casino area
- Former names: Kursaal; Cazin
- Alternative names: Cazinoul Comunal

General information
- Status: Open for visitors
- Architectural style: Art Nouveau
- Location: Constanța County, Romania, Constanța
- Coordinates: 44.1705°N 28.6635°E
- Year built: 1880; 1893; 1910
- Renovated: 1917–1928; 1934–1937; 1951–1952; 1986–1988; 2020–2025
- Cost: 1.3 million lei (1910)
- Owner: Constanța City Hall
- Governing body: Ministry of Culture

Design and construction
- Architects: Daniel Renard; Petre Antonescu
- Built for: General use
- Demolished: 1892; 1907
- Rebuilt: 1893; 1910
- Current use: Cultural building
- Website: cazinoul.com

Monument istoric
- Type: Architectural Monument of National Interest
- Designated: 2004
- Part of: National Register of Historic Monuments in Romania
- Reference no.: CT-II-m-A-02801

The Constanța Casino (Romanian: Cazinoul din Constanța) is a casino located in Constanța, Romania. Designated by the Romanian Ministry of Culture and National Patrimony as a historic monument, the casino is situated on the Constanța seafront along the Black Sea in the historic Peninsulă District of the city.

Three different buildings were constructed in the district to house a casino, with the first structure being erected of wood in 1880. Considered a symbol of the city of Constanța, the current structure was built in Art Nouveau style, designed and built according to the plans of Daniel Renard and inaugurated in August 1910. The current Casino was used for gambling operations for 38 years, with interruptions due to the two world wars: attacked and bombed by Bulgarian and German troops in World War I, ravaged in World War II, and, at one point, acting as a makeshift wartime hospital. In 1948, it was transformed into a community centre, and in 1960, it was handed to the National Office of Tourism, which converted it into a restaurant. The last major repairs took place in 1986–1988, and the building was abandoned until 2019. After five years of renovation works, the casino was again opened to visitors on 21 May 2025.

== History ==
=== Cazin Kursaal (1880–1891) ===
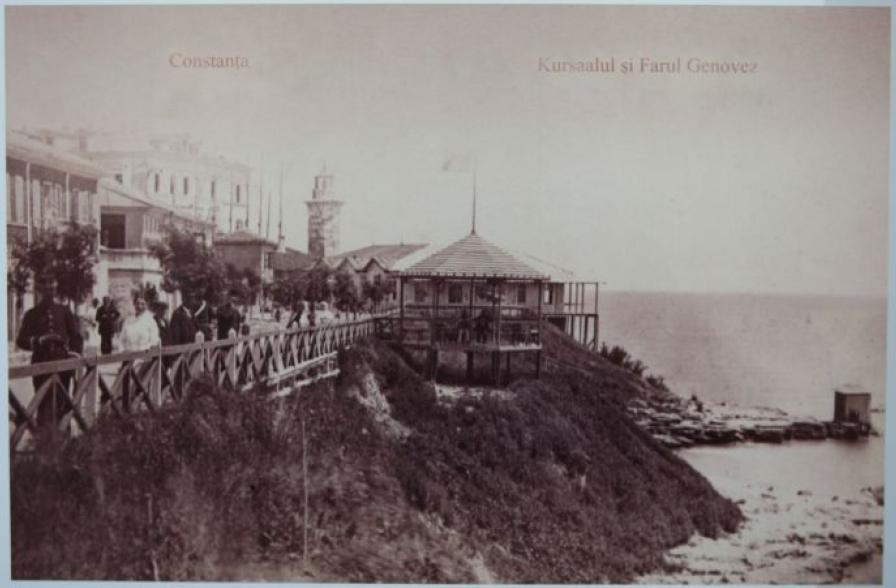
First Constanța Casino with Genoese Lighthouse

The first version of the Constanța Casino was built with a wood frame in 1880 and was named Cazin or Kursaal ("spa hall" in German). It was the first Romanian building to be constructed on the shore of the Black Sea shortly after Northern Dobruja came under Romanian administration as a result of the Russo-Turkish War (1877–1878) and the Romanian War of Independence.

The building's design utilized slopes to create two rounded, overlapping terraces with the purpose of providing a full view of the cliff, the sea, and the Constanța harbor from all angles. It was situated adjacent to the Genoese Lighthouse. The interior housed a ballroom, two games halls, and two reading halls, where visitors could read local, national, and international press. Initially, the City of Constanța leased and rented the building and space to entrepreneurs. One of those casino entrepreneurs was Captain Constantin Creangă, son of writer Ion Creangă and father of Horia Creangă, the leading Romanian architect during the interwar period. The building was later transferred and administered by the County Council, which opened it up for use. Finding that the building merely produced enough income to cover maintenance, it was once again leased out to wealthy entrepreneurs. In 1891, the wood-structured Cazinoul din Constanța was almost entirely destroyed by a storm, and on January 29, 1892, its demolition was approved.

=== Cazino (1893–1907) ===
The second version of the Casino was commissioned and built by the City of Constanţa at a nearby location, opening its doors in 1893. The building featured a wooden structure and was situated near the current location of the Casino. It housed a dance hall and several rooms, but only one terrace facing the sea. In May 1902, Captain Constantin Creangă petitioned the local mayor and city management to lease the building. Advertising himself as a chef, a skilled confectioner, and fluent in two commonly-spoken lingua franca of the time, he successfully secured the building's transfer to his care for 2,000 lei a year. The lease stipulated that he should "sell merchandise and products of only the finest and highest quality" and use "petroleum of the best quality on the property as to not produce any odor when burned" for lighting.

Romanian writer Petre Vulcan described his impressions of the Casino: "At first sight we were attracted by the party pavilion, whose mammoth feet rise from the waves, with a wrapped porch pushed over the sea. From the interior music sprang, and cheerful couples dance Boston; from outside the lanterns hanging towards the sea dance enchantingly, under which noble ladies and lords converse intimately, vanishing into the sea of people before them, as in 'A Thousand and One Nights'."

=== Modern Cazinoul Comunal (1910-present) ===
==== Construction ====
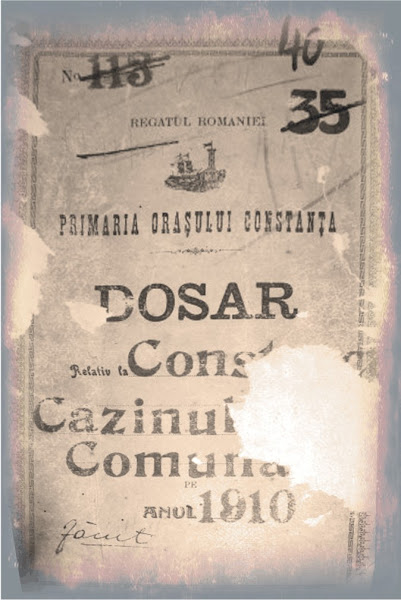
Casino's feasibility study

In 1903, local politicians agreed that it was time for the city of Constanța to have a modern casino, "...like those which inspired the French Riviera". The Liberal government at the time immediately approved the project. The project was awarded to Daniel Renard, a Romanian architect of Swiss descent who lived in Constanța. Daniel Renard, then 32 years old and a graduate of the École des Beaux-Arts in Paris, proposed to build an Art Nouveau structure, which stirred considerable controversy. His proposal was supported by the Liberals in power, but harshly criticized by the entire opposition.

As the building's foundation was being cast, the politicians who appointed Renard were replaced. Construction was halted, and Renard was quickly replaced with Petre Antonescu. Antonescu envisioned a theater-like building with two towers in the Neo-Romanian style and began working on the new plans by pouring a second foundation. However, two years after Renard was removed, the Liberal Party regained power in 1907. Renard was reappointed, resuming his project as he had originally envisioned in the Art Nouveau style. Consequently, Renard had a third foundation laid.

The construction resumed for a third time in 1907 and was completed in 1910 with a total construction cost of 1.3 million lei, excluding other expenses such as furniture, fittings, architect's commission, etc. Each of the three foundations cost 70,000 lei, while the furniture itself cost approximately 90,000 lei according to Romanian art critic and researcher Doina Păuleanu. Historical documents also show that electricity was installed by the Sociertatea Anonimă de Gaz of Budapest, and railings, gratings, and metalwork items were executed by the Wolf Factory in Bucharest. The asphalt on the outer sidewalk and the iron grating, including three gates, were made by the M. Segal Company in Bucharest, costing 19,000 lei. The city also purchased a piano from the Otto Harnisch Company in Bucharest and hired an orchestra of 18 people at a cost of 20,000 lei per season.

==== Inauguration and reception ====
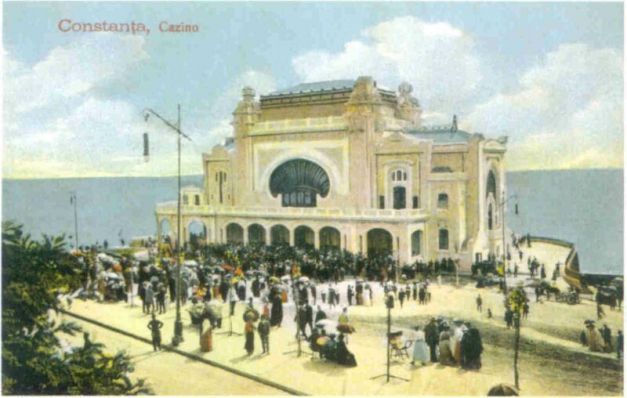
Postcard of Third Casino

The third and current version of the Casino was inaugurated on August 15, 1910, in the presence of Prince Ferdinand. Speeches were held paying homage to King Carol I, Prime Minister Ion I. C. Brătianu, Minister of Public Works Vasile Morțun, and a performance by the Davilla Theatre troupe and a celebratory grand ball took place for Constanța's elite. After the opening, on March 15, 1911, Mayor Titus Cănănău of Constanța leased the building for one year to Alphonse Heitz, owner of the Café de Paris restaurant in Bucharest. Despite political opposition, on the same day the contract was awarded, the County Commission authorized gambling, equipping the Casino with two billiard tables and 17 gambling tables for card games. In a short time, the casino in Constanța became one of the most popular establishments of its kind in Europe.

The building attracted both admiration and criticism. For example, the travel journal of French diplomat George Oudard in 1935 mentioned the following: "One thing which is disappointing in this welcoming place: the white casino, pretentiously complicated, of the most dreadful and horrific style of 1900, which burdens the sea coast." The casino did not escape the criticism of local media either, being characterized as a "Hulking heap strewn with all sorts of gewgaws and cheap fineries" by journalists in a March 1910 edition of the Conservatorul Constanței newspaper. Journalists of the publication Drapelul in a December 1911 editorial criticized mayor Titus Cănănău for not doing more "to squander time and resources as to hinder the monstrosity." Many of the critics were against the asymmetric architecture of the building, the gaudy construction elements, and the architectural lines, albeit innovative, that made the building discordant in relation to Romanian neoclassical architecture of the time.

After a year, in 1912, the City of Constanța opened a bidding process for the management of the Casino. A 20-year lease was awarded to Baron Edgar de Marcay, represented by attorney Nicolae P. Simonide from Bucharest. The Baron was the owner of the "Society of Great Establishments." As part of the lease agreement, the Society was obligated to construct a luxury hotel for the upper-class clientele of the Casino. The result was the Palace Hotel, inaugurated on July 13, 1914, with 250 rooms with baths, electrical lighting, heating, balconies, a world-class restaurant, and a rooftop terrace. French architect E. P. Goue received the order for the hotel project on March 28, 1912. A restaurant annex was also built in 1912. By this time, some local newspapers had changed their tune of the structure. The luxury of the casino and world-class gambling attracted the wealthy from all over the world.

The casino was visited by the Russian Imperial Family in 1914.

The Casino hosted yearly parties kicking off the tourism and swimming season on the Romanian Riviera. The Sirena publication documented such a festivity, stating, "On April 3, 1916, the Casino reopened to a fanfare of public amazement. The reopening presented this season as one of cleanliness and better taste than previous seasons, with several upgrades being done to the terrace and billiard tables. As billiard was not available, the immense billiard room was transformed into a large consumption room for food and drink at this time. Barul American (The American Bar) also radically changed in appearance and comfort, introducing many luxurious updates and innovations that had you feeling as if you were in a great European City... In the Great Hall, Emilian Gheorghiu's orchestra drew public attention through the perfect execution of classic and modern art pieces, especially the use of the cellos. In the evening, after drinks and supper, the auditorium was transformed into a cinematographic projection room where large audiences would gather to view cinematic pieces."

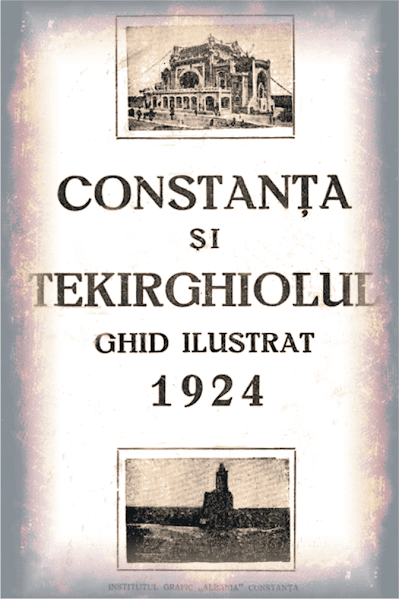
Interbellic Tourism Guide for Constanța and the Casino

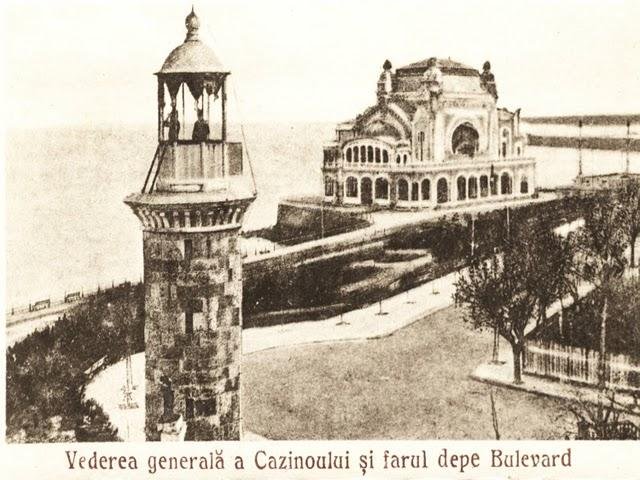
View of lighthouse and Casino

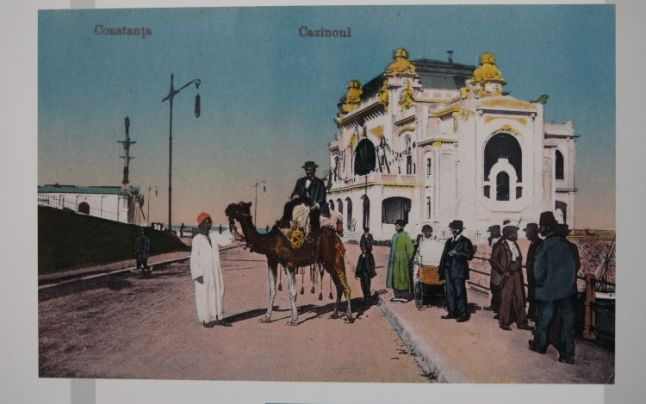
Postcard of Casino with camel

==== First and Second World War ====
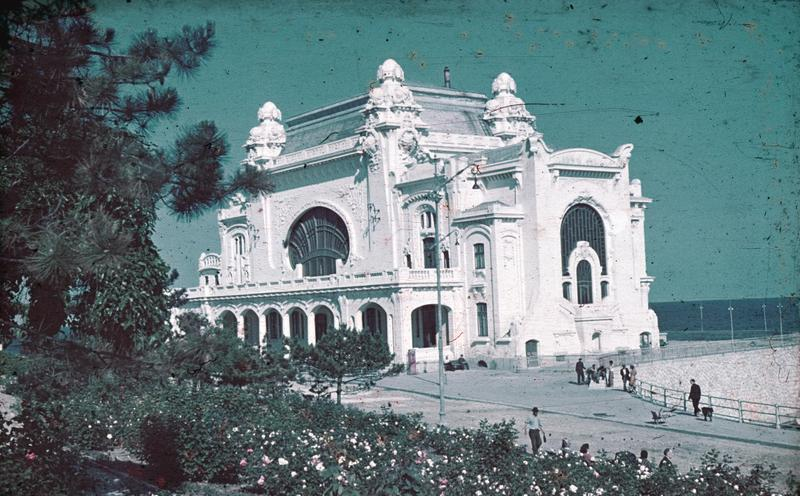
The Casino seen in 1941

In the autumn of 1916, when the bombings of Constanța began during World War I by the Germans, the casino building was transformed into a hospital and used by the Red Cross. The nearby Port of Constanța was the primary target of the Germans, but the close proximity of the Casino left it inevitably affected. Ten people were killed in the Casino when it was hit by shrapnel. Images of the bombings of the Constanța shore, including the casino itself, can be found in the Imperial War Museum of the United Kingdom (IWM). The casino became functional and reopened November 19, 1917. Repairs were finally completed by 1928. The casino was later completely restored between 1934 and 1937 by the initial architect Daniel Renard himself.

During World War II the Casino became host to German troops invited into the country by the government in 1941; the Germans used the building for accommodation. Once again, the Casino was bombed in June 1941. The targets were the same as in the First World War, but this time, the devastation was greater in the Peninsulă district of the city. The war left the Casino abandoned and ruined, with Allied forces targeting the city and bombing the structure. The aftermath of World War II left the symbolic building surrounded by abandoned sentries and wired fencing.

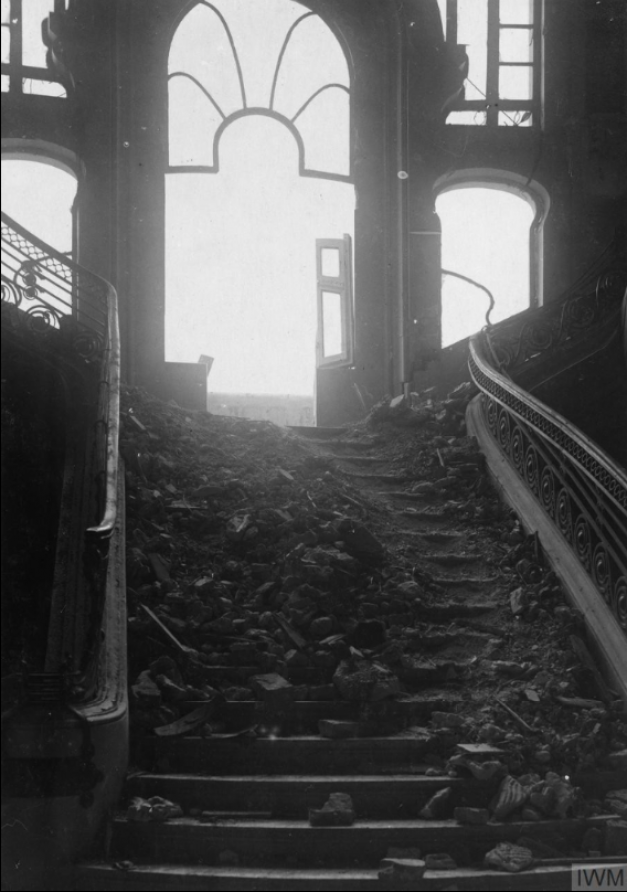
Windows and Doors destroyed in World War I

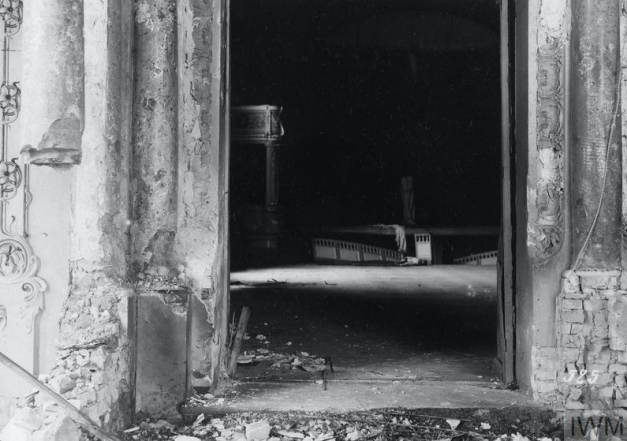
Damage to Casino Entryway

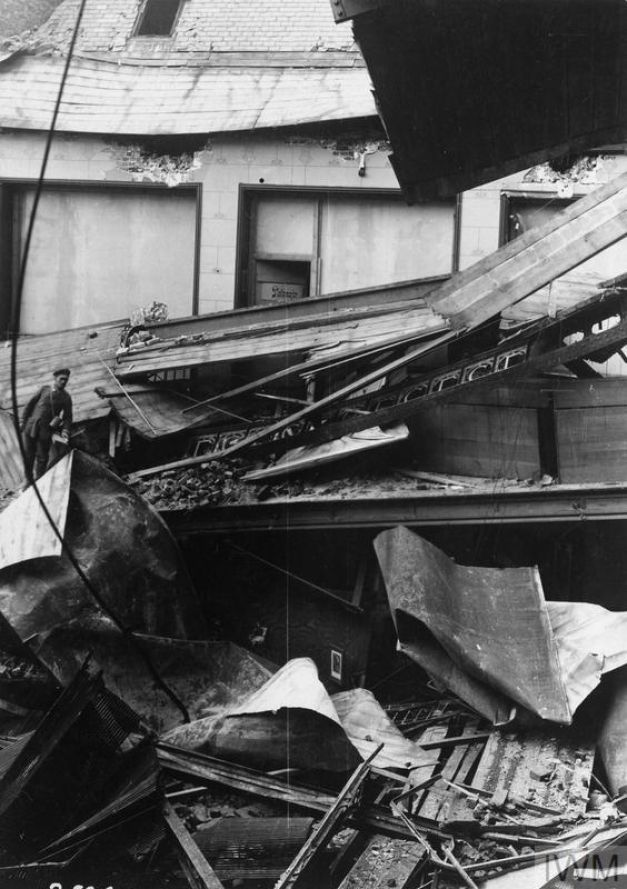
World War I Damage to Casino

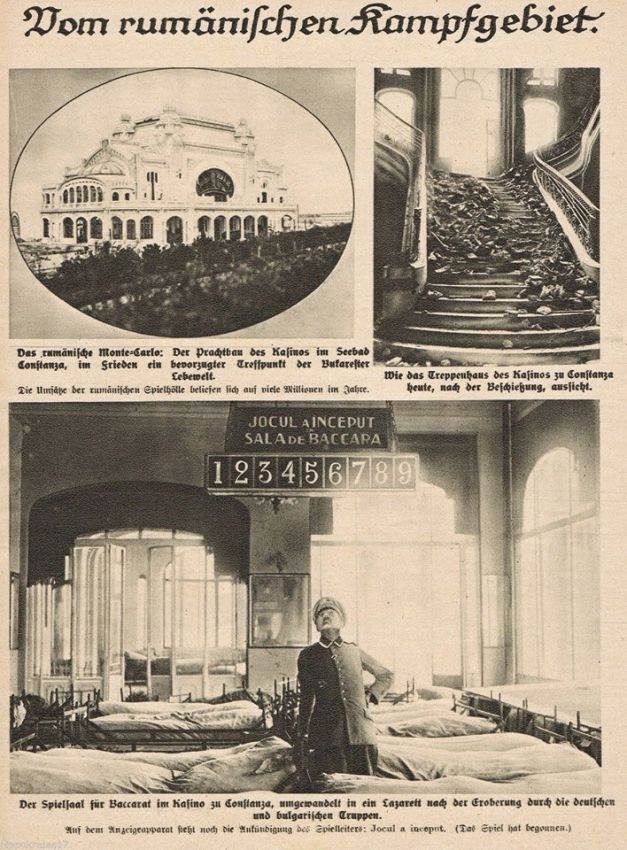
Casino turned into a wartime hospital

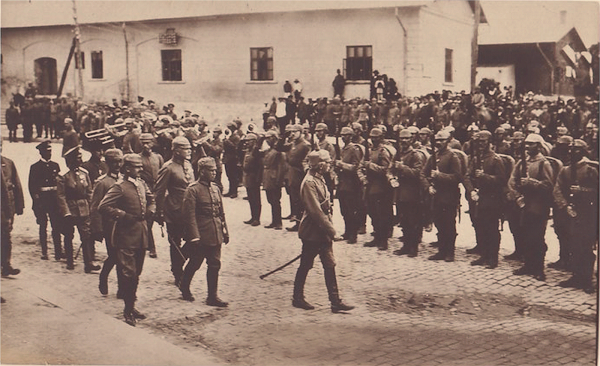
August von Mackensen with troops near the Casino boardwalk

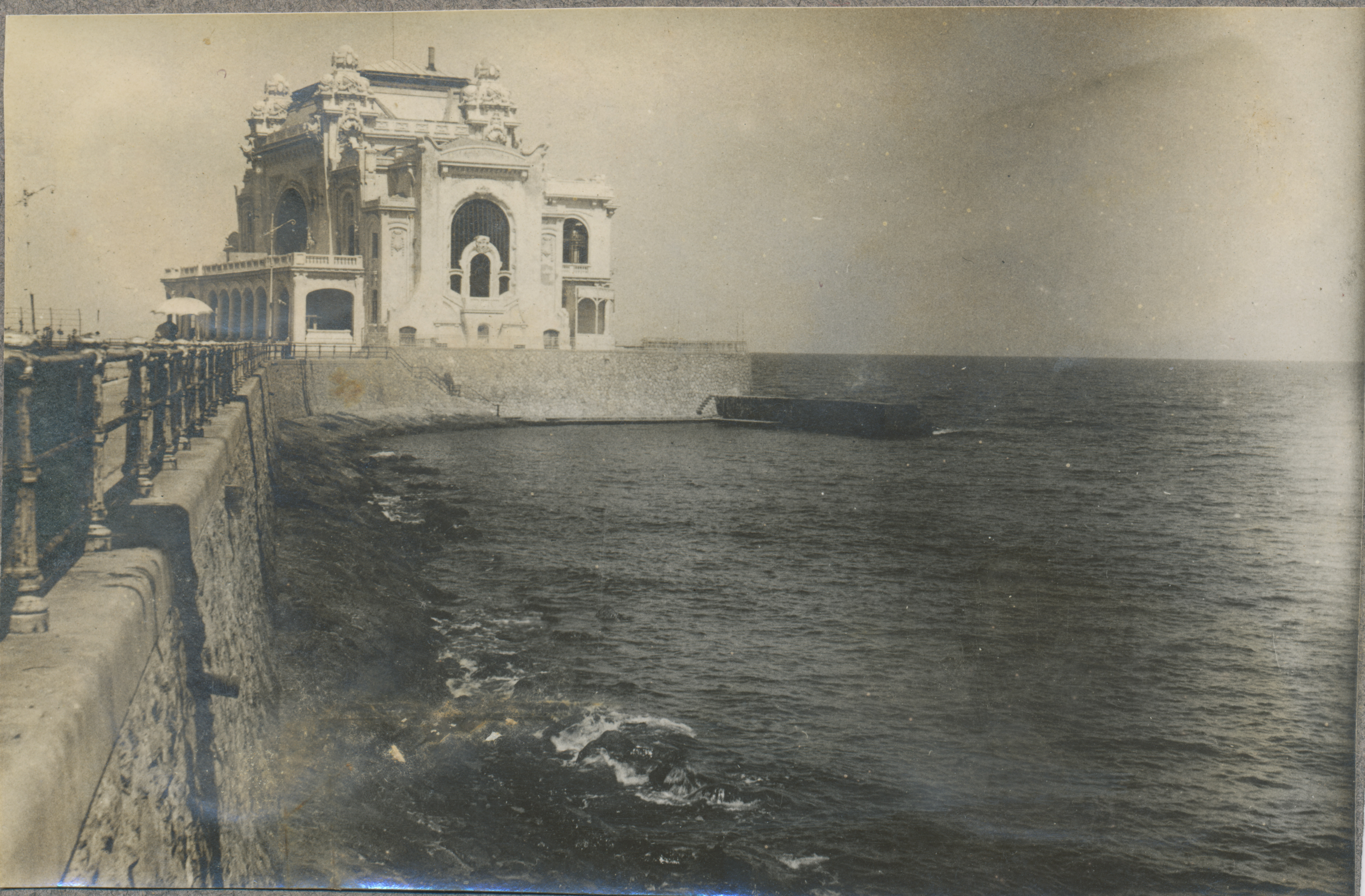
Casino after the occupation of the port of Constanța by Soviet sailors in 1944

=== Casino in the communist era ===
After communism came to Romania, the post-war government decided to transform the casino into a House of Culture. The casino was renovated by the government using political prisoners from the Poarta Albă camp, under deputy engineer Aurel Mărășescu starting in 1951. After the year 2000, one of these laborers attempted to put together a list of prisoners that worked on the project and managed to remember 59 fellow prisoners, claiming there were 100 of them. He stated, "We worked between 12 and 14 hours a day including Sundays. First time I was a bricklayer. Everything was destroyed in that building. There was nothing, no doors, no windows, no fixtures. It was a wreck... ". The prisoners reportedly slept in a seaside area, being the only place in the building where the sky wasn't visible. There was no heating available, and they were at the mercy of the elements, even resorting to eating animal organs, according to one of the prisoners. The project was the same every day—work, gruelingly and endlessly, and then sleep. At the end of July 1952, the building was reclaimed by the three colonels of the Securitate who were responsible for supervising the prisoners and the project: Albon, Cozmici, and Crăciun. In 1956, the building was declared part of the national patrimony.

The last major renovation happened between 1986 and 1988.

=== Modern era ===
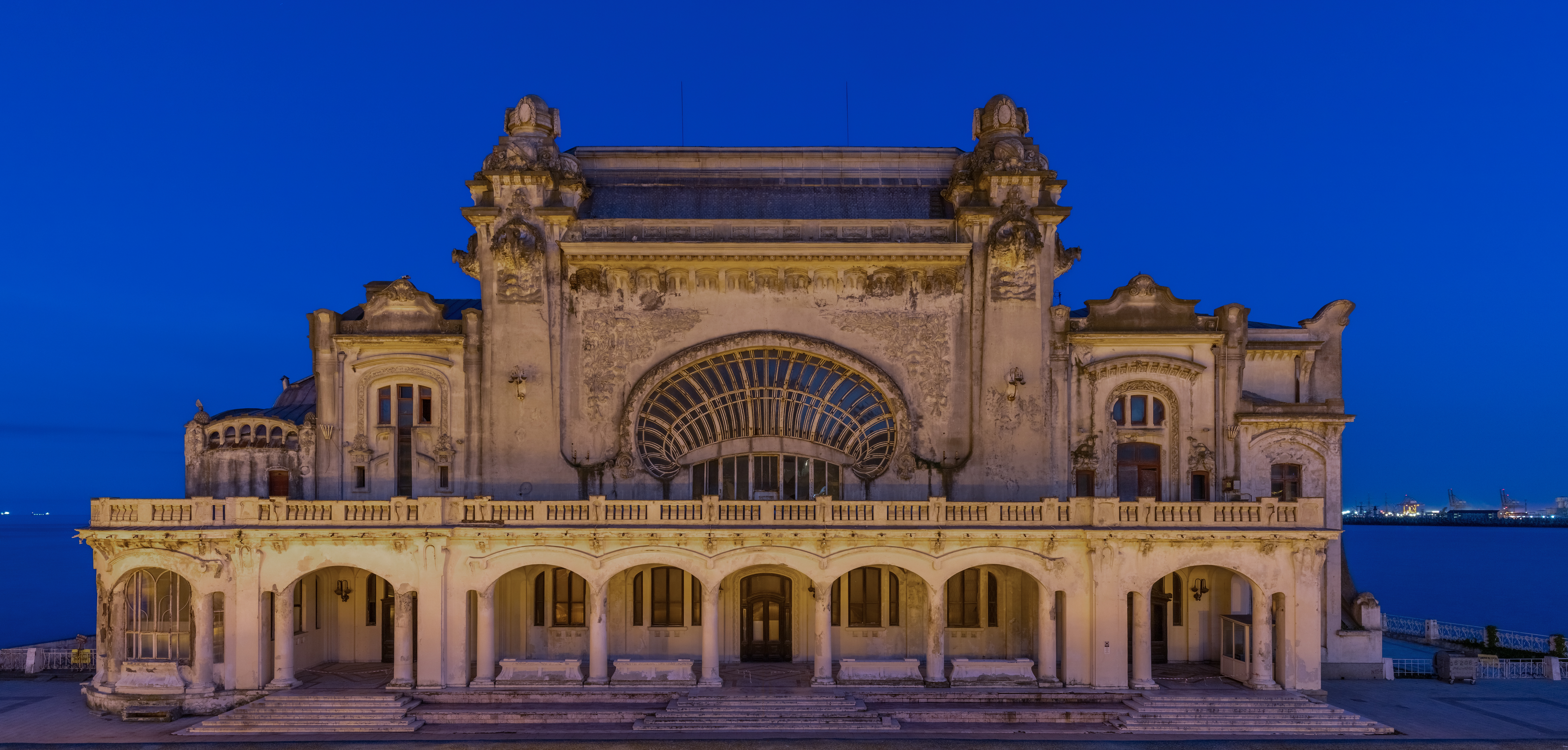
The Casino at sunrise in 2016

Due to large operational expenses, the building was closed in 1990. Constanța City Hall tried to rehabilitate the building in 2006. In 2007, the casino was leased for 49 years to the Israeli "Queen" group. After numerous delays, local authorities took back the building more damaged than before its transfer to the Israeli company. In January 2018, Europa Nostra, with the support of the European Investment Bank Institute, as a founding partner, and the Council of Europe Development Bank as an associate partner, listed the Casino as one of the 7 most endangered sites in Europe.

In 2014, the edifice was transferred to the administration of the National Investment Company as a final rescue solution. An auction was held to award the contract for the execution of rehabilitation work in the casino, with 5 private companies signing up. All five firms were disqualified for not meeting the minimum qualification standards set by the government. A period of appeals and litigation followed, meanwhile the casino remained abandoned.

10 million euros were allocated to the rehabilitation of the casino, but due to litigation and political frenzy, the money and Casino had remained untouched. The mayor of Constanța in 2018, Decebal Făgădau, announced that the City of Constanța would begin public works and conservation efforts. Finalization of the works was to occur on 14 November 2018, on Dobrogea Day, independent of the National Investment Company's auction date.

At the end of 2019, the Aedificia Carpați company was contracted to carry out the restoration. On 13 January 2020, the Ministry of Development issued the order to start work on the Constanța Casino, and two days later the restoration work began. The rehabilitation was expected to finish in 2022, however, it was discovered that the casino required more work. The works were completed in March 2025 and the casino was handed over to the Constanța City Hall, then was reopened to visitors on 21 May 2025. The casino is open for public visitors and can also host both public cultural events and private events.
