= Unification of Moldavia and Wallachia =

1859 formation of the modern Romanian state

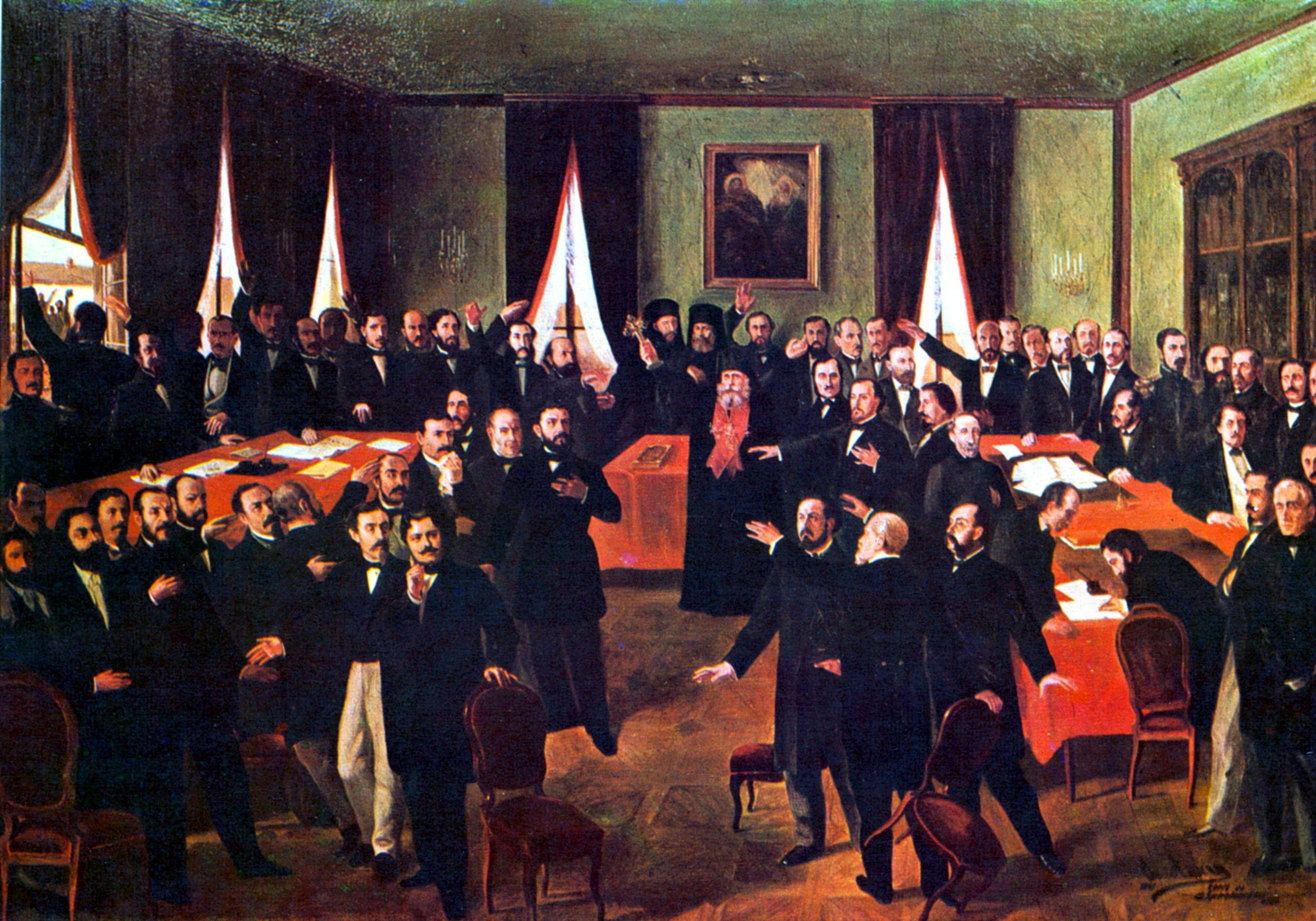
- Painting by Theodor Aman on the proclamation of the union
- Native name: Mica Unire
- Date: 24 January [N.S. 5 February] 1859
- Location: Danubian Principalities
- Participants: Moldavia; Wallachia

The unification of Moldavia and Wallachia (Romanian: Unirea Moldovei și Țării Românești), also known as the unification of the Romanian Principalities (Romanian: Unirea Principatelor Române) or as the Little Union (Romanian: Mica Unire), happened in 1859 following the election of Alexandru Ioan Cuza as prince of both the Principality of Moldavia and the Principality of Wallachia. A potential unification between the two principalities, which shared a common Romanian ethnicity, language, and culture, had not been favored by the great powers for a long time, although it was accepted by them once it happened. The unification of these two states began a political struggle in the new country (the United Principalities of Moldavia and Wallachia) to find out which of the two regions would obtain "supremacy" and met some opposition in Moldavia by the so-called "separatists".

Nowadays, in Romania, the unification of Moldavia and Wallachia is regarded as a prelude to the Great Union, a name used in Romanian historiography to refer to the unifications of Romania with the regions of Bessarabia, Bukovina, and Transylvania in 1918 during or following the end of World War I. It is also commemorated every 24 January through the Day of the Unification of the Romanian Principalities in both Romania and Moldova.

== See also ==
- Ad hoc divans
- German unification
- Italian unification
- Romanian nationalism
- Greater Romania
- Unification of Moldova and Romania
