= Great Union Day =

Romanian national holiday on 1 December

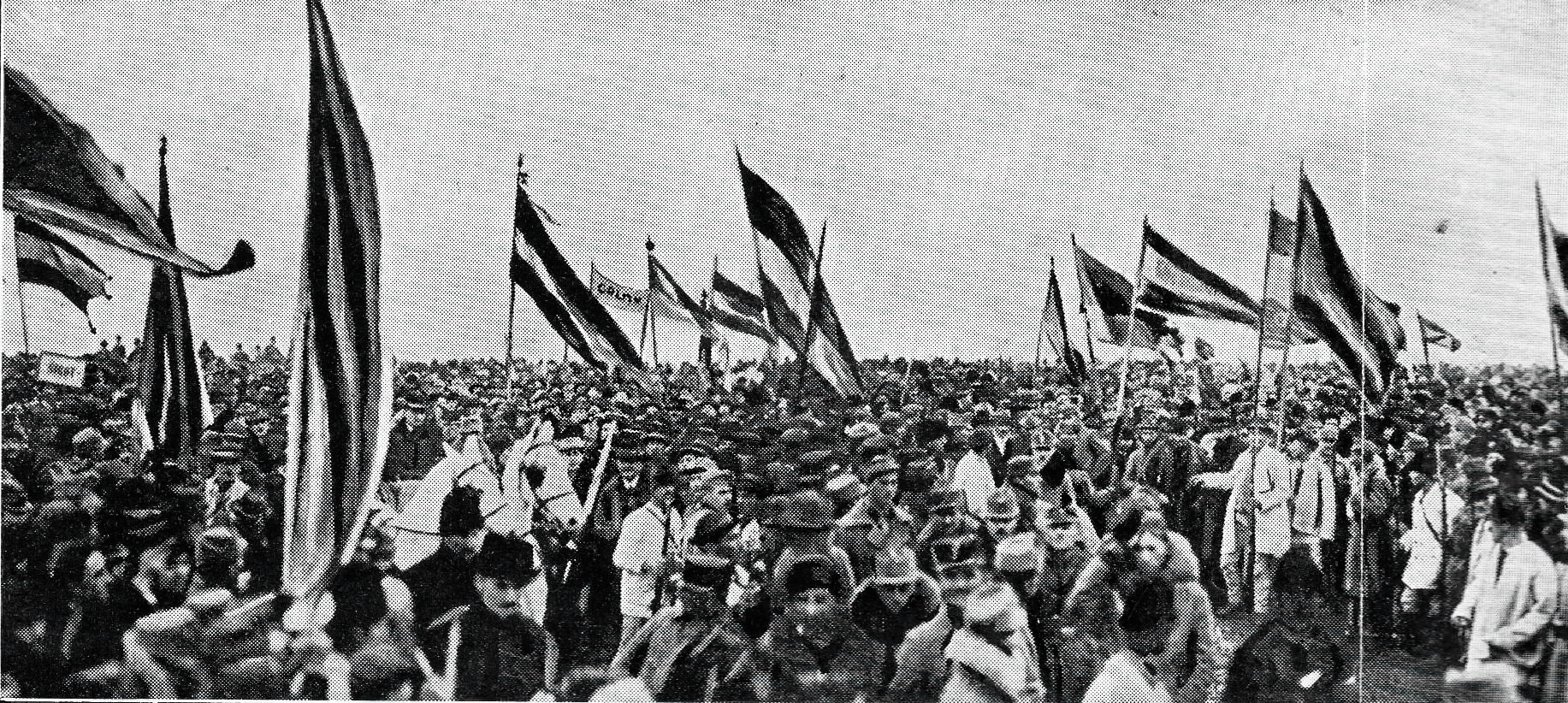
- The Great National Assembly of Alba Iulia (1 December 1918)
- Official name: Ziua Națională a României
- Also called: Ziua Marii Uniri
- Observed by: Romania; Moldova (unofficially)
- Celebrations: Military parades (most notably in Alba Iulia and Bucharest) and fireworks
- Observances: Te Deum at the Alba Iulia Orthodox Cathedral
- Date: 1 December
- Next time: 1 December 2026
- Related to: Day of the Unification of the Romanian Principalities (24 January)

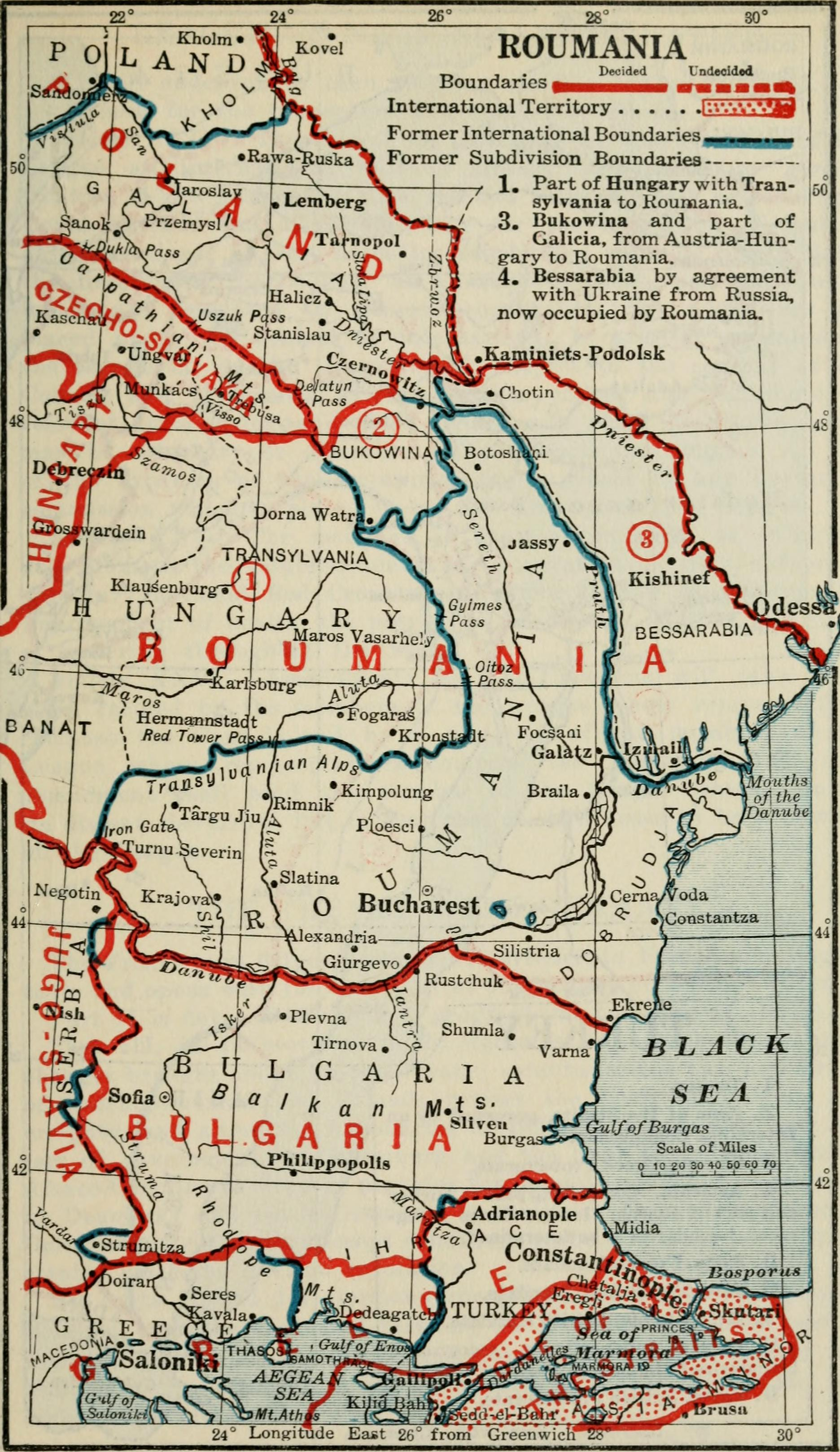
Map of Romania in 1919 with new regions annexed to it.

Great Union Day (Romanian: Ziua Marii Uniri), also called Unification Day or National Day, is a Romanian national holiday celebrated on 1 December to mark the 1918 Great Union (the unification of Transylvania, Bassarabia, and Bukovina with the Romanian Kingdom). The holiday was declared after the Romanian revolution and commemorates the Great National Assembly of the delegates of ethnic Romanians held in Alba Iulia, who declared the Union of Transylvania with Romania.

Until the abolition of the Romanian monarchy in 1947, the national holiday was observed on 10 May, which had a double meaning as it was the date on which the future King Carol I first set foot on Romanian soil in 1866 and on which he later ratified Romania's Declaration of Independence from the Ottoman Empire in 1877. During the communist regime from 1948 to 1989, the national holiday was observed on 23 August (Liberation from Fascist Occupation Day) to mark the 1944 overthrow of Ion Antonescu's government by King Michael I, with parades held in Charles de Gaulle Square (then called Stalin Square and later Aviators' Square). In 1990, the holiday's date was moved to 1 December to match the date of the Great Union.

== History ==
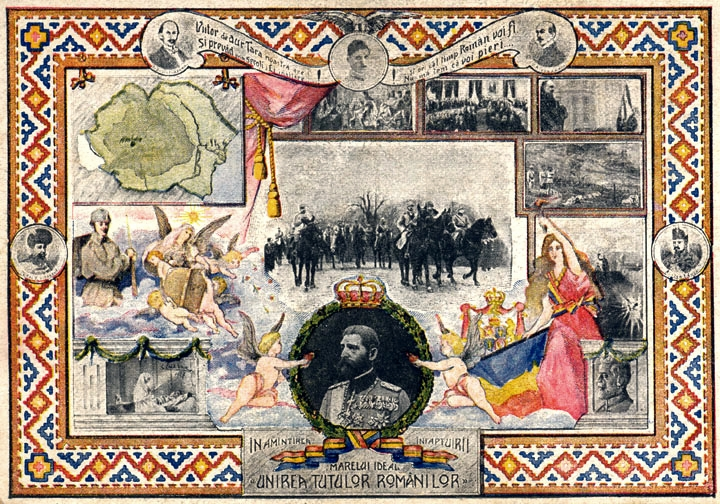
Romanian postcard issued c. 1918–1919. Note the unusual shape of Romania's western borders as pictured on the map (the country is supposed to include all of Maramureș, a bigger part of Crișana, and possibly the entire Banat – pictured in white); the definitive borders would not be drawn until 1920.

=== Background ===
Modern Romania appeared after the unification of Moldavia and Wallachia by prince Alexandru Ioan Cuza on 24 January 1859. This act, sometimes known as the Little Union, is now celebrated as the Day of the Unification of the Romanian Principalities (or Little Union Day).

=== Great National Assembly of Alba Iulia ===
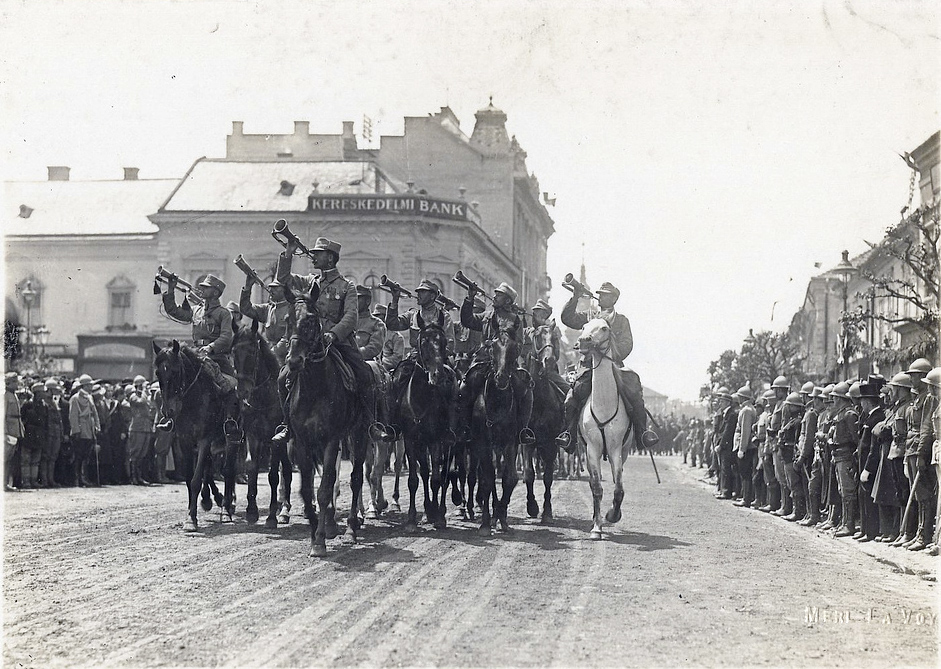
Romanian troops marching in Transylvania (here Piața Unirii, Cluj)

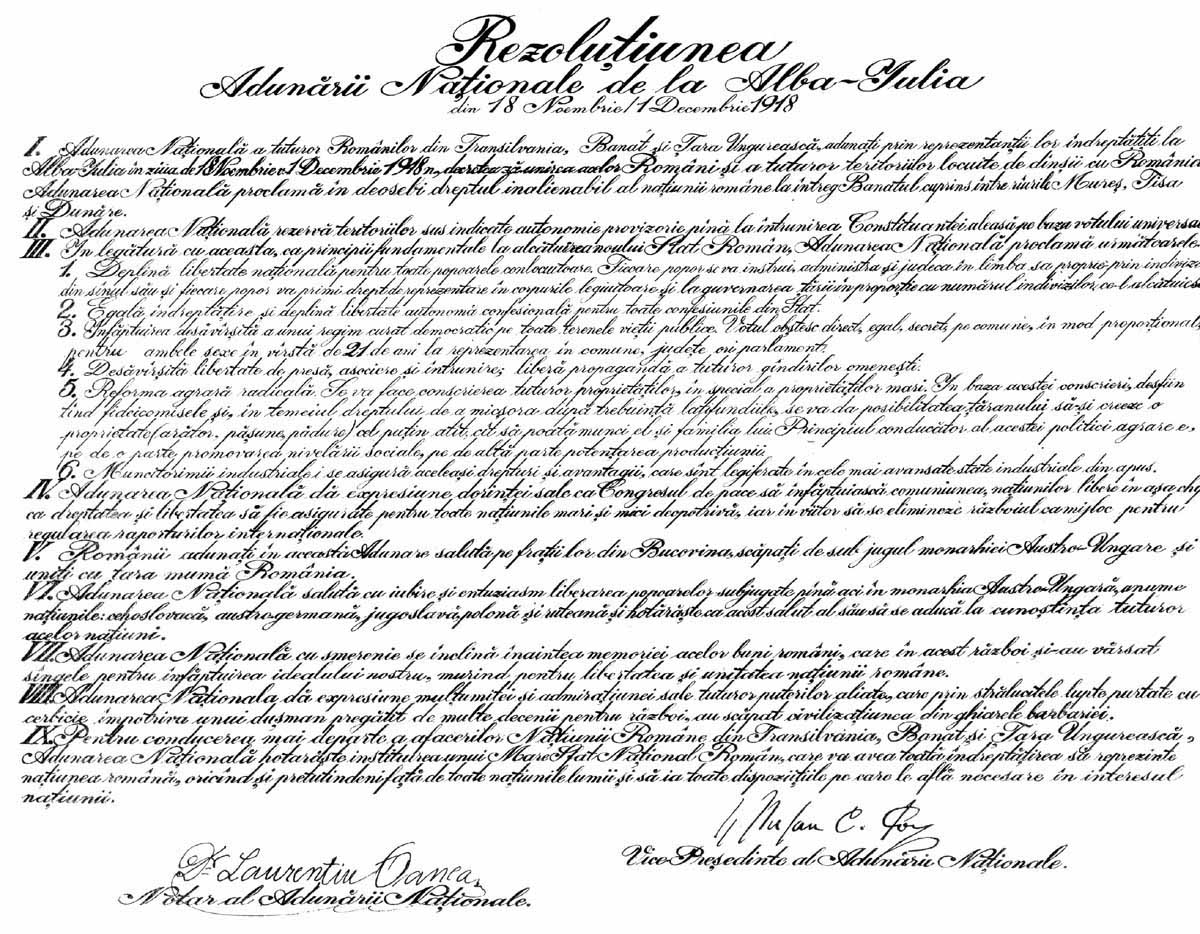
The Resolution of the Great National Assembly of Alba Iulia

On 1 December 1918 (November 18 Old Style), the Great National Assembly of Alba Iulia, consisting of 1,228 elected representatives of the Romanians in Transylvania, Banat, Crișana, and Maramureș, convened in Alba Iulia and decreed (by unanimous vote) "the unification of those Romanians and of all the territories inhabited by them with Romania".

The Resolution voted by the National Assembly stipulated also the "fundamental principles for the foundation of the new Romanian State". It was conditional, and demanded the preservation of a democratic local autonomy, the equality of all nationalities and religions. Later, the Romanian National Council of Transylvania was also formed.

The next day, 2 December 1918, the Romanian National Council of Transylvania formed a government under the name of the Directing Council of Transylvania, Banat and the Romanian Lands in Hungary, headed by Iuliu Maniu.

On 11 December 1918 King Ferdinand I signed the Law regarding the Union of Transylvania, Banat, Crișana, the Satmar, and Maramureș with the Old Kingdom of Romania, decreeing that:

The lands named in the resolution of the Alba-Iulia National Assembly of the 18th of November 1918 are and remain forever united with the Kingdom of Romania.

— Ferdinand I, 11 December 1918

=== Declaration of the holiday ===
Resolution 903 of the Council of Ministers on 18 August 1948 had marked 23 August as the national holiday. Law 10/1990, declared on 1 August 1990, moved the national holiday to 1 December. It was adopted in 1990 by a parliament dominated by members of the National Salvation Front and promulgated by the president Ion Iliescu. The decision combated in some amount sympathy with the tradition of Romanian monarchy, associated with 10 May, but also disappointed the anti-communist opposition, who wished for the national holiday to be moved to 22 December.

The choice of 1 December referred to the unification of the provinces of Transylvania, Banat, Crișana, and Maramureș with Romania in 1918. The choice of this day as a national holiday was seen then by some Hungarians as an affront to the Hungarian minority of Romania, which signified for them a loss in political power.

=== First celebration ===
The first 1 December national holiday saw the largest celebrations in Alba Iulia, the location in which the proclamation of the union of Transylvania with Romania was signed. They were marked by significant political polarization: Corneliu Coposu, then the leader of the anticommunist opposition, was interrupted several times during a speech by boos from the crowd. Petre Roman, then the prime minister, showed such pleasure at these repeated interruptions that Ion Iliescu had to gesture to him to stop. This signal was captured on film and spread widely by the mass media.

== National Military Parade ==
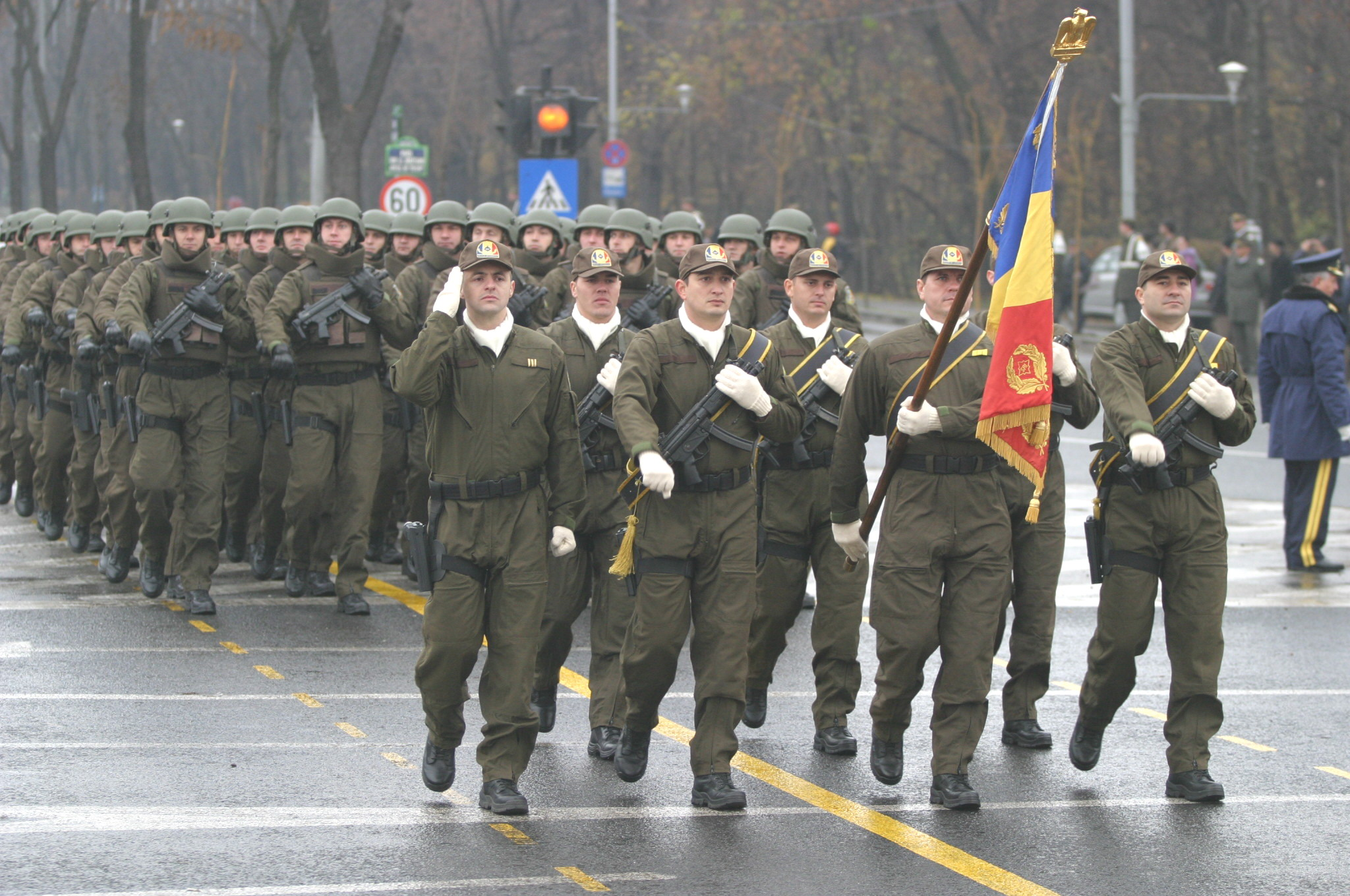
A Counter-Terrorism Battalion of the Romanian Intelligence Service on parade in 2008.

Every year, an annual military parade known officially as the National Military Parade (Romanian: Parada Militară Națională) of the Romanian Armed Forces either on the grounds of Piața Constituției (Constitution Square) or on Șoseaua Kiseleff just within metres of the Arcul de Triumf in central Bucharest is held in honor of the occasion. A parade is also held in the city of Alba Iulia and other major cities.

The President of Romania is the guest of honor at the Bucharest parade. As Commander in Chief, the president receives the report of the Chief of the Romanian General Staff upon their arrival on the square to a bugle call fanfare being played by a lone trumpeter. After receiving the salute, the president walks to salute the color guard provided by the Michael the Brave 30th Guards Brigade before inspecting and greeting the guard of honor. After this, Deșteaptă-te, române! is then performed by the Massed Bands of the Bucharest Garrison, made partly from musicians of the 30th Guards Brigade and a combined military and civilian choir as a 21-gun salute is fired in the background. Following this, in the Kiseleff Road parade, the president lays a wreath at the Arcul de Triumf before heading back to the grandstand. After this, the parade commander, who is a general-ranked officer of the Armed Forces, then orders the start of the parade in the following manner:

Parade... attention! Ceremonial pass in review!
Eyes to the right, by the left, forward, quick march!

The parade proper then begins at this point which is usually led by a massed color guard and foreign troops before the active personnel of the armed forces march on the parade route as the massed bands play music led by its senior director. A historical segment of servicemen in First World War uniforms usually forms part of the march past. The march past is composed first of all active formations followed by those of the military academies and NCO schools.

After this, the ground mobile column, which are composed of tanks, APCs, IFVs, the field and air defense artillery and logistics vehicles of the Armed Forces, police vehicles, and emergency vehicles follow, accompanied by the occasional flypast of the Armed Forces and Police. Foreign troops have included delegations from Turkey, the United Kingdom, Moldova, and the United States, with specific units including the Slovenian Guards Unit, the United States Marine Corps and the Honor Guard Company of the Moldovan National Army.

The parade is then ended with the Honour Guard Company of the 30th Guards Brigade and then followed by the massed bands marching off the square.

== See also ==
- Union of Bessarabia with Romania
- Union of Bukovina with Romania (Bukovina Day)
- Greater Romania
- Kingdom of Romania
- History of Transylvania
