= Union of Transylvania with Romania =

1918 unification of the Kingdom of Romania with the region of Transylvania

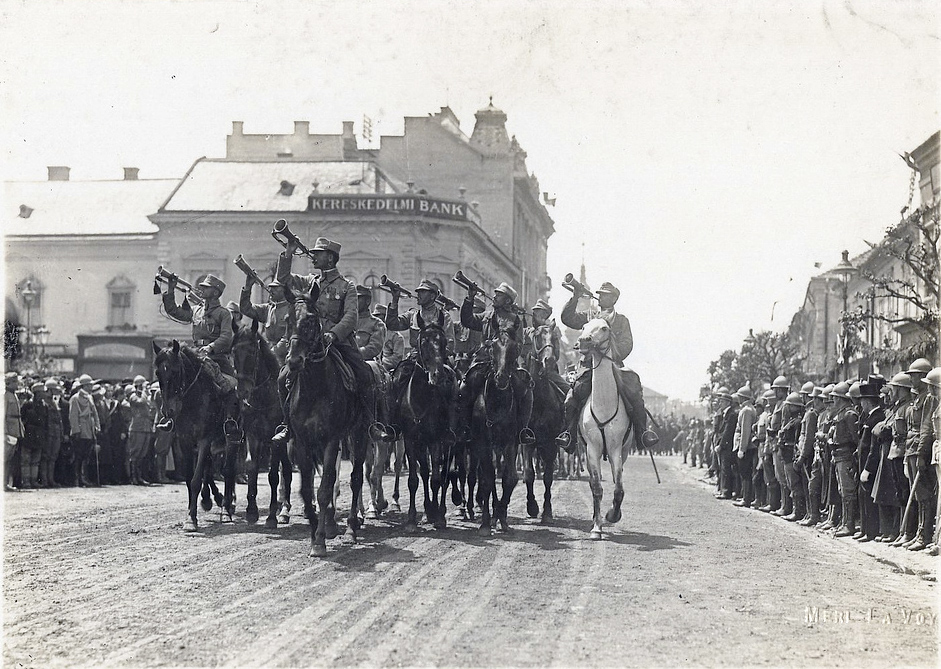
Romanian troops marching in Transylvania

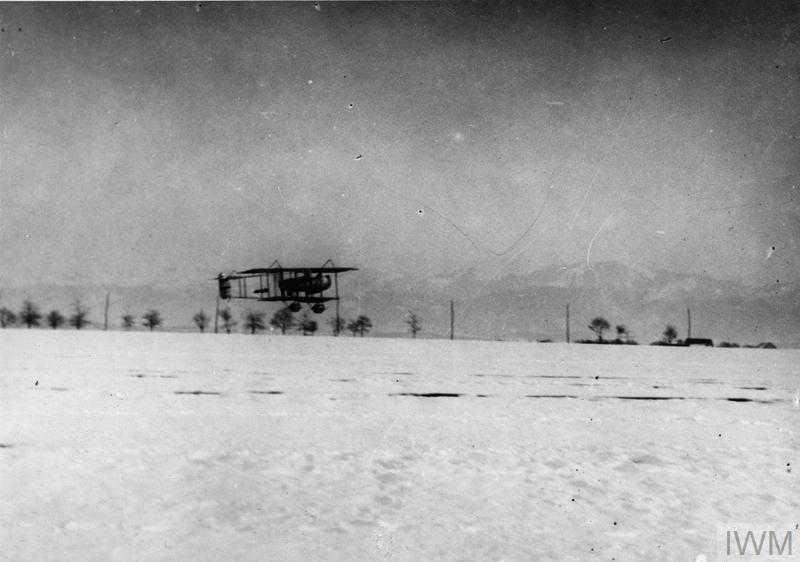
Airplane carrying the documents for the union taking off from Bacău

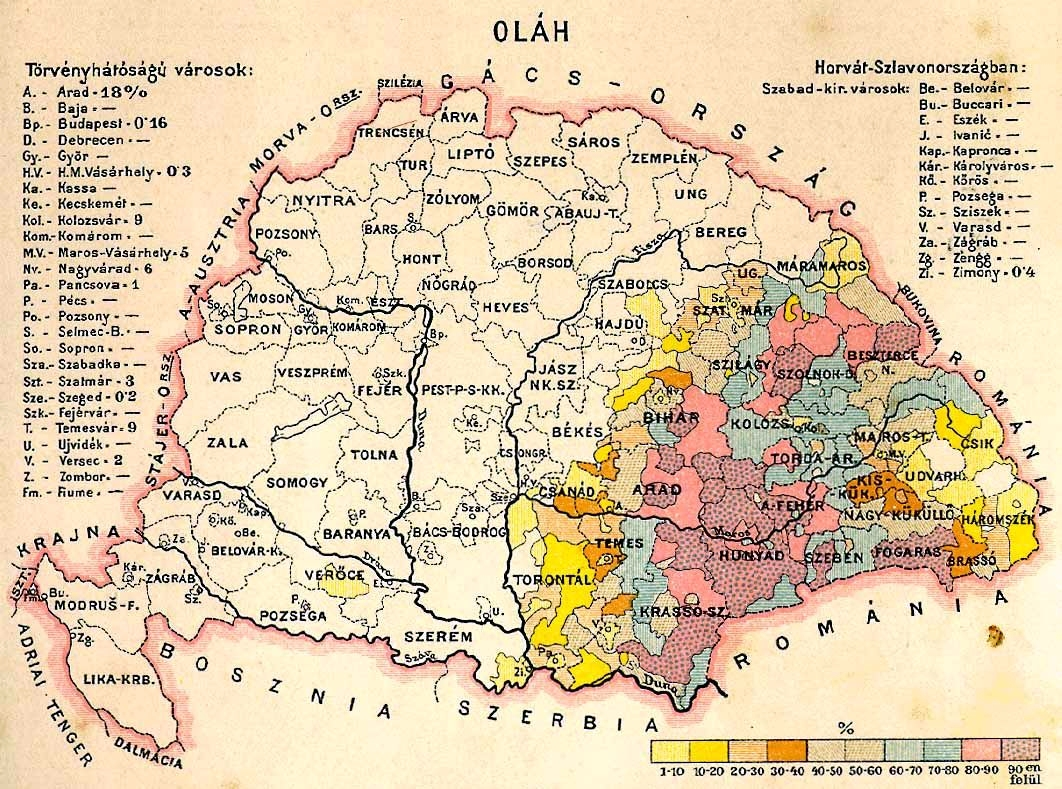
Romanians in the Kingdom of Hungary according to Hungarian census in 1890

Timeline of the borders of Romania, 1859–2010

The union of Transylvania with Romania was declared on 1 December [O.S. 18 November] 1918 by the assembly of the delegates of ethnic Romanians held in Alba Iulia. Great Union Day, also called Unification Day, is a national holiday in Romania celebrated on 1 December. The holiday was established after the Romanian Revolution, and celebrates the unification not only of Transylvania, but also of Bessarabia and Bukovina and parts of Banat, Crișana and Maramureș with the Kingdom of Romania. Bessarabia and Bukovina had joined with the Kingdom of Romania earlier in 1918.

== Causes and leading events ==
- 17 August 1916: Romania signed the secret Treaty of Bucharest with the Entente Powers, according to which Transylvania, Banat, and Partium would become part of Romania after World War I if the country entered the war. The planned border followed a line some 20-40 kilometres west of the present Hungarian-Romanian border, but joined river Tisza in the South, thus granting the whole of Banat to Romania.
- 27 August 1916: Romania attacks Austria–Hungary. The offensive is soon halted by Austro–Hungarian and German forces. In return, with a combined push from Transylvania and from Bulgaria, the Central Powers occupy Wallachia, including Bucharest. The Romanian capital temporarily moves to Iași.
- December 1916: The German offensive is stopped along the Mărășești–Galați line.
- 6 December 1916: The capital city, Bucharest, was captured by the Central Powers, which now controlled two-thirds of the territory of Romania.
- 8 December 1916: German General August von Mackensen was appointed as the military governor of the occupied territories of Romania.
- May–July 1917: Romanian troops halt a German offensive and push them back to the last trench line, but lose the momentum.
- 9 December 1917: Romania signs an armistice with the Central Powers.
- January 1918: US President Woodrow Wilson condemns any secret treaties and requests autonomy for the ethnic groups of Austria–Hungary.
- 26–28 March 1918: A Congress of Nationalities of Austria-Hungary takes place in Rome. A motion is passed, demanding the recognition of the right of each nation to constitute into a national state, which would stay independent, or would unite with its already existing national state.
- 9 April [O.S. 27 March] 1918: Bessarabia, after a three-month independence from Russia, proclaims Union with the Kingdom of Romania. Romanian and some minority deputies (86 in total) vote for, while the majority of the minorities' (Ukrainian, Russian, German, Jewish, and Gagauz) representatives (36 in total) abstain. Two Ukrainian and one Bulgarian deputies vote against. The declaration is co-signed by the (pro-German) prime-minister Alexandru Marghiloman for the Romanian government.
- 18 May [O.S. 5 May] 1918: A peace treaty is signed between the Central Powers (Germany, Austria–Hungary and Bulgaria) and the Kingdom of Romania, to replace the five-month-old armistice. Romania recovers its pre-war territory occupied by the Central Powers in December 1916, except for Dobruja and the mountain regions. The treaty is not ratified by Romania, in the hope that the tide of the war would turn the other way. The Central Powers, in accordance to the treaty, begin to pull out its troops from occupied Wallachia.
- 24 August 1918: A National Council of Romanian Unity is created in Paris, with Take Ionescu as president, Vasile Lucaciu, Octavian Goga, Dr. Constantin Angelescu and Ioan Theodor Florescu as members. It is recognized as "the exponent of the interests of the Romanian nation of Austria-Hungary" by France (29 September), the United States (23 October), the United Kingdom (29 October), and Italy (9 November), the four powers of the Entente.
- 2 September 1918: A Congress of Czechs, Slovaks, Poles, Romanians, Serbs, Croatians, and Ruthenes of Austria-Hungary takes place in New York City. A resolution demanding the division of Austria–Hungary and the liberation of its peoples is passed.
- 12 October 1918: The Executive Committee of the Romanian National Party, the major party in Transylvania representing Romanians in the Kingdom of Hungary, takes place in Nagyvárad (Oradea). A declaration is passed, demanding the creation "in virtue of the national right of every nation to decide its own fate" of a Central National Romanian Council, a provisional governing body for Transylvania. To this end the Romanian National Party forms an Action Committee, seated in Arad, and presided by Vasile Goldiș.
- 18 October, 1918:
  - Alexandru Vaida-Voevod, the preeminent Romanian politician in Austria–Hungary, reads the above Declaration of Self-determination in the Parliament of the Hungarian part of Austria–Hungary in Budapest.
  - Emperor Charles I of Austria puts forward a "Manifesto to my faithful peoples", about the reorganization of Austria–Hungary into a federation of six independent states: Austrian, Hungarian, Czech, Yugoslav, Polish, and Ukrainian. The Manifesto fails to achieve its goal, being regarded as a step that comes way too late. National Councils spring up throughout Austria–Hungary, and prefer to negotiate directly with the Entente powers, rather than with the failing Central Government.
  - A reply to Charles' manifesto is passed by the Corps of the Transylvanian and Bukovinian Volunteers in the Austrian-Hungarian Army, which calls for a union of the territories inhabited by Romanians with the Kingdom of Romania. Iuliu Maniu, a preeminent Transylvanian politician, gathers in Vienna 70,000 Transylvanian soldiers from the Austrian-Hungarian Army, and takes them to Transylvania.
- 23 October 1918: Rudolf Brandsch, a Saxon representative in the Hungarian parliament in his speech declared the adherence to the territorial integrity of Hungary, outlining in case other minorities would be granted privileges the Saxon community do not bear, it should be equalized and the rights of the Germans of Hungary should continue to be respected in the future as well.
- 31 October 1918: A new government, led by Károlyi Mihály is formed in Budapest, with the democrat Oszkár Jászi as Minister of Nationalities. The Hungarian government terminates its union with Austria, officially dissolving the Austro-Hungarian state.
- 3 November 1918:
  - General Weber, on behalf of Austria–Hungary, signs the armistice treaty in Padua, Italy.
  - The Romanian National Council is created from representatives of the Romanian National Party and those of Social-Democrat Party of Transylvania, and takes control over the local authorities in Transylvania. The Hungarians administrative apparatus disintegrates. Károlyi Mihály's Hungarian government enters negotiations with the Central National Romanian Council.
- 6 November [O.S. 24 October] 1918: As the Entente's victory on the Western Front seems more and more likely, and as the Army of General Maurice Sarrail from Salonica breaks through the Bulgarian lines on the Balkan Front, the Romanian pro-German government of Alexandru Marghiloman resigns. A new government, with General Constantin Coandă as Prime Minister, is formed. The general mobilization is decreed.
- 10 November [O.S. 28 October] 1918: Romania re-declares war on the Central Powers.
- 9 November 1918: The Romanian National Council sent a memorandum to Budapest demanding the handover of Eastern Hungary (besides the historical Transylvania the counties of Torontál, Temes, Krassó Szörény, Arad, Bihar, Szilágy, Szatmár and Máramaros).
- 12 November 1918: The first Romanian troops enter Hungary and occupy the Gyergyótölgyes (Tulgheș) mountain pass accessing the Székely Land Region.
- 13 November 1918: An Armistice on the Balkan Front is signed in Belgrade, Serbia, between the French General Franchet d'Esperey, chief of the Entente's Oriental Army, and the Hungarian government. Small-scale military action continues for a few days in southern Hungary. The agreement fixes demarcation lines between Hungary, Serbia and Romania, according to which the region of Banat goes under Serbian administration, in spite of the 1916 secret treaty with Bucharest. Körösvidék (Crișana) and Máramaros (Maramureș), including the cities of Szatmárnémeti (Satu Mare), Nagyvárad (Oradea), Belényes (Beiuș), and Arad, as well as the inner Transylvania up to the river Maros (Mureș), are left under Hungarian administration. Hungary is required by the Entente Powers to allow Romanian troops to enter the Transylvanian territories east of the demarcation line along Mureș. Hungary is allowed to keep only eight army divisions. Disarmed troops are returning home.
- 13–15 November 1918: Negotiations are held in Arad between the Hungarian government of Károlyi Mihály and the Central National Romanian Council (of Transylvania), without reaching any agreement. News about the Belgrade agreement reach the Romanian (Transylvanian) delegation. The Central National Romanian Council retreats from negotiations and decides to hold elections and convey for November 18/December 1 the National Assembly of Romanians from Transylvania and Hungary, and to hand power to the latter.
- 13–20 November 1918: Romanian troops occupy further major mountain passes on the northeastern border of Hungary. They have the intent to occupy up about a quarter of the territory of Transylvania, as allotted by the 13 November armistice in Belgrade to pass under its temporary administration. Hungary pulls out troops to comply with the armistice treaty. Isolated armed clashes with the Hungarian military police occur.
- November 1918: During a 12-day interval, elections are held for the National Assembly of Romanians of Transylvania and Hungary. Its 1,228 members are elected 5 each from the electoral districts established in 1910 (600 members in total), and 628 to represent different social, professional and cultural organizations (clergy, teachers' unions, military). The local enthusiasm gains momentum, as demands such as land reform, universal vote, and possible union with Romania are put forward.
- 23 November 1918: A Farman F.40 of the Romanian Air Corps lands at Blaj carrying several important documents regarding the union for the Central National Romanian Council which included letters from Ion I. C. Bratianu and Nicolae Bălan. News that the Romanian Army had crossed into Transylvania were also delivered. On the return flight a day later, the decision for the union with Transylvania and the date for the planned National Assembly is brought to Romania.
- 25 November 1918: The Romanian Army occupies Marosvásárhely (Târgu-Mureș), the most important town of Székely Land, in eastern Transylvania.
- 25 November 1918: The General Council of the Saxons in Nagyszeben (Sibiu) decided in question of Transylvania to choose clear neutrality, without committing themselves either to the Hungarian or the Romanian side.
- 28 November 1918: The National Assembly of Székelys in Marosvásárhely (Târgu-Mureș) reaffirms their support to the territorial integrity of Hungary.
- 28 November 1918: The elected 100-member General Congress of Bukovina passes a resolution of unconditional union with the Kingdom of Romania. Deputies speaking Romanian (74), German (7) and Polish (6) vote for, while the 13 Ukrainian deputies leave before the final vote.

== Great National Assembly of Alba Iulia ==
The Great National Assembly of Alba Iulia (1 December 1918)

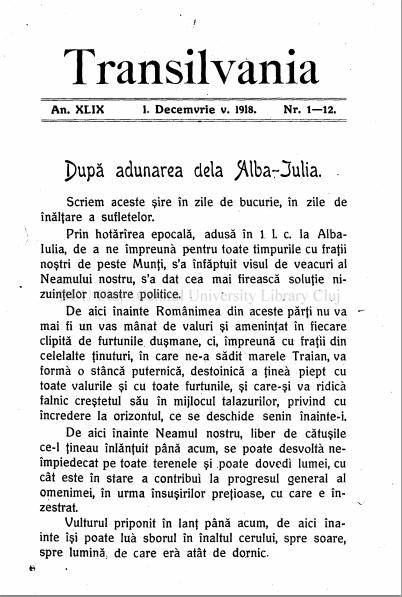
First page of Transilvania newspaper from December 1918, referring to the event

On 1 December 1918 (N.S., 18 November O.S.), the National Assembly of Romanians of Transylvania and Hungary, consisting of 1,228 elected representatives of Romanians in Transylvania, Banat, Crișana and Maramureș, convened in Alba Iulia and decreed (by unanimous vote):

the unification of those Romanians and of all the territories inhabited by them with Romania.

The declaration included 26 counties of the Kingdom of Hungary.

The Resolution voted by the National Assembly stipulated also the "fundamental principles for the foundation of the new Romanian State":

- Full national freedom for all the co-inhabiting peoples. Each people will study, manage and judge in its own language by individual of its own stock and each people will get the right to be represented in the law bodies and to govern the country in accordance with the number of its people.
- Equal rights and full autonomous religious freedom for all the religions in the State.
- Full democratic system in all the realms of public life. Suffrage universal, direct, equal, secret, in each commune, proportionally, for both sexes, 21 years old at the representation in communes, counties or parliament.
- Full freedom of the press, association and meeting, free propaganda of all human thoughts.
- Radical agrarian reform. All the assets, above all the big ones, will be inscribed. The wills by which the heir consigns the land to a third party will be abolished; meanwhile, on the basis of the right to cut down estates freely, the peasant will be able to his own property (ploughing land, pasture, forest), at least one for him and his family to labour on. The guiding principle of this agrarian policy is promoting social evening, on the one hand, and giving force to production, on the other.
- The industrial workers will be granted the same rights and privileges that are in force in the most advanced western industrial states.

The union was conditional, and demanded the preservation of a democratic local autonomy, the equality of all nationalities and religions.

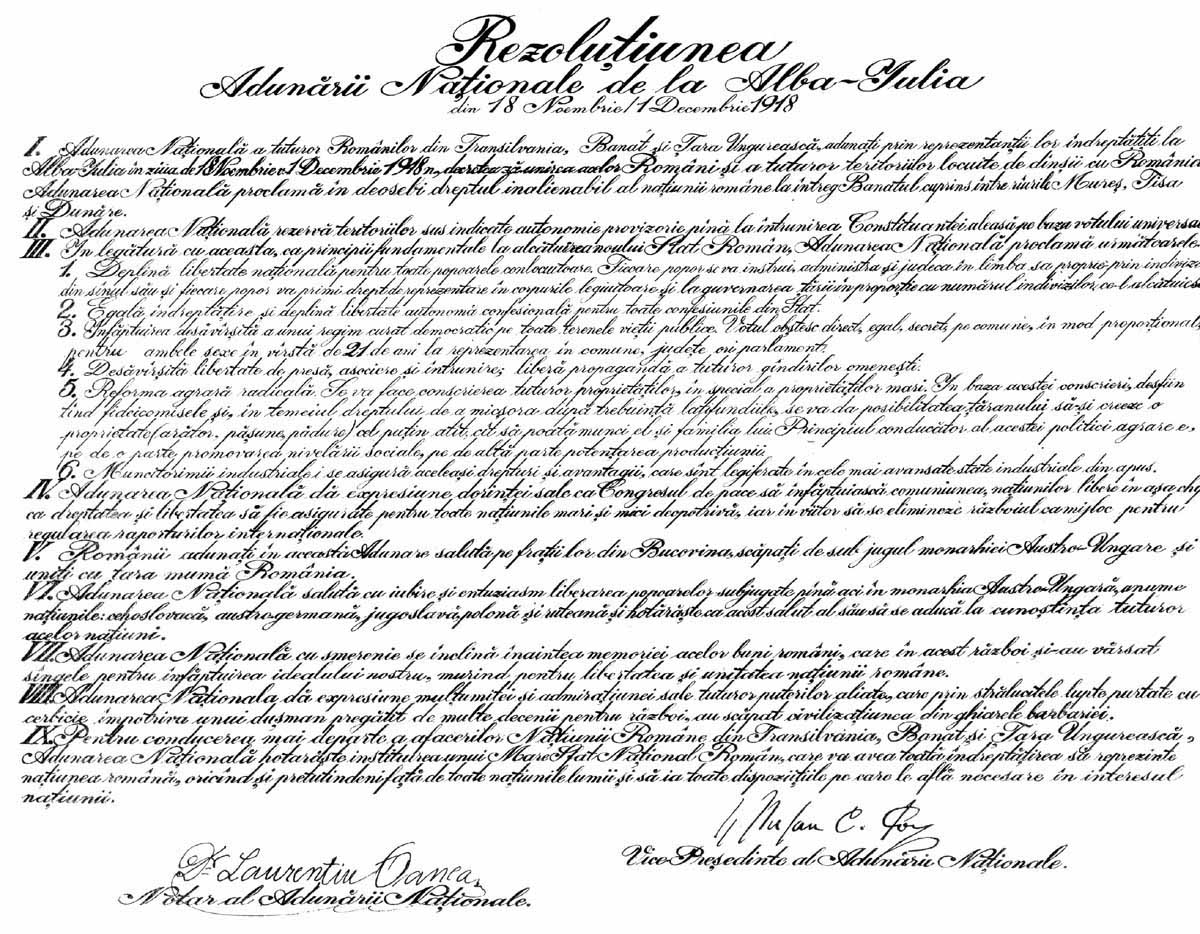
The Resolution of the National Assembly

The Assembly also formed from 200 of its members, plus 50 co-opted members a High National Romanian Council of Transylvania, the new permanent parliament of Transylvania.

The next day, on 2 December 1918 the High National Romanian Council of Transylvania formed a government under the name of Directing Council of Transylvania, Banat and the Romanian Lands in Hungary, headed by Iuliu Maniu.

On 11 December 1918, Ferdinand I of Romania signed the Law regarding the Union of Transylvania, Banat, Crișana, the Satmar and Maramureș with the Old Kingdom of Romania, decreeing that:

The lands named in the resolution of the Alba-Iulia National Assembly of the 18th of November 1918 are and remain forever united with the Kingdom of Romania.

== Aftermath ==
=== Inner Transylvania and Maramureș ===
Protest of the Transylvanian National Council in Kolozsvár (Cluj) on 22 December 1918

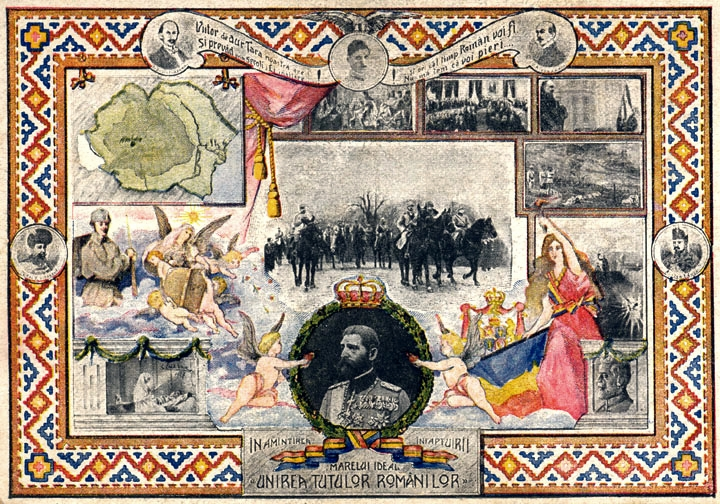
Romanian postcard issued c. 1918–1919. Note the unusual shape of the western borders of Romania. The country is supposed to include all Maramureş, a bigger part of Crişana, with the possibility of having all Banat (the white area). The definitive borders were established only in 1920.

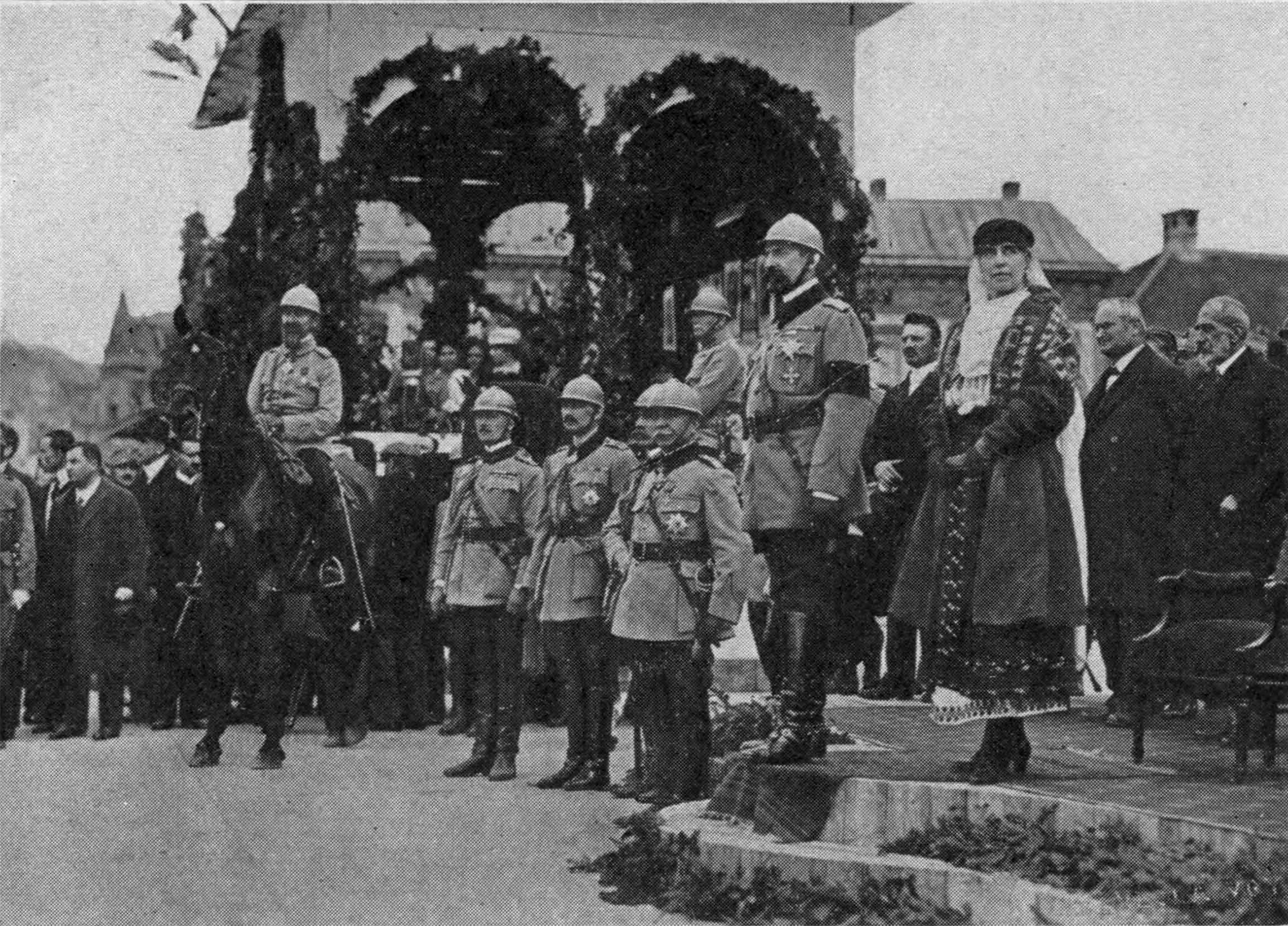
King Ferdinand and Queen Marie in Transylvania (1921)

- 7 December 1918: The Romanian Army enters Brașov (Brassó), in southeastern Transylvania.
- 7 December 1918: General Henri Berthelot, the commander of the French Danubian forces, gave Romanian troops permission in early December to cross the Mures and occupy eight towns between Arad and Máramarossziget (Sighetu Marmației), but he delays informing the Hungarian government of this decision for a long time. The Romanian Army is heading towards Torda (Turda), with the intention of occupying Kolozsvár (Cluj), the most important city in Transylvania. Hungary is ordered by the Entente Powers to further pull back its troops.
- December 1918: The Hungarian Government decides to recruit soldiers to be able to resist the advancing Romanian troops but the time is too short.
- 12 December 1918: Romanian troops enter Nagyszeben (Sibiu) (southern Transylvania).
- 14 December 1918: The Directory Council of Transylvania, elected by ethnic Romanians, sends a delegation headed by Miron Cristea, the Bishop of Caransebeș (Karánsebes), to Bucharest to negotiate the details of the Union. King Ferdinand I of Romania receives and accepts the Declaration of Union, passed on December 1 by the National Assembly of Romanians of Transylvania and Hungary.
- 22 December 1918: In response, a Hungarian General Assembly in Cluj (Kolozsvár), the most important Hungarian town in Transylvania, reaffirms the loyalty of Hungarians from Transylvania to Hungary.
- 24 December 1918: As King Ferdinand I of Romania signs the decree sanctioning the Union of Bessarabia, of Bukovina, and of Transylvania with Romania, the Hungarian government protests. Romania starts negotiations in Versailles with the four Entente powers, as well as with Czechoslovakia, Hungary, Serbia, Bulgaria, and Russia, for the establishment of the new border.
- 24 December 1918: Romanian troops enter Cluj (Kolozsvár). Cluj and other major towns are surrendered with no resistance.
- January 1919: Following a Romanian request, the Allied Command in the East under the leadership of the French general Franchet d'Esperey allows the Romanian Army to advance up to the line of the Western Carpathians. Entente negotiators in Versailles show open hostility towards the boldness of the actions of Romanians. Romanians in turn claim the decisions of the Parliament of Transylvania should have priority over the armistice agreements between France and Hungary.
- 8 January 1919: A National Assembly of Germans of Transylvania and Banat is held in Mediaș (Medgyes), central Transylvania, and a declaration is passed to support the decision of the Romanians to unite with the Kingdom of Romania.
- 14 January 1919: Romanian troops reach Baia Mare.
- 18 January 1919: The Romanian Army enters Sighetu Marmației.
- 22 January 1919: Romanian troops now control the entire territory up to the new demarcation line indicated by the Entente powers. Inner Transylvania and Maramureș (Máramaros) are under Romanian control, leaving Banat under Serbian, and Crișana (Körösvidék) under Hungarian control.

=== Crișana and the Hungarian-Romanian War of 1919 ===
- 19 March 1919: French lieutenant-colonel Fernand Vix, on behalf of the Entente Powers, notifies Hungary of a new demarcation line to which the Romanian Army would advance. This line coincides with the railway line Satu Mare (Szatmárnémeti) – Oradea (Nagyvárad): Arad, however the Romanian Army is not allowed to enter these cities. A demilitarized zone is to be created, stretching from there up to 5 km beyond the border marking the extent of the Romanian territorial requests on Hungary. The retreat of the Hungarian Army behind the westward border of the demilitarized zone is to begin on 23 March, 1919.
- 21 March 1919: Hungary's Prime Minister Károlyi says in an address to the people that he cannot accept the territorial losses that the Entente powers press on him to accept, and transfers the power to a radical left-wing government, headed by the Communist Béla Kun, who in turn proclaims Hungary a Soviet Republic, and renounces the passive policy of accepting territorial losses dictated by the Entente.
- March 1919: The Romanian delegation at the Peace Conference in Paris, headed by Prime Minister Ion I. C. Brătianu, asks the Council of the Great Powers to allow Romania to occupy the territory up to the river Tisza (as agreed upon before Romania's entry into the war in 1916). The proposal is rejected. South African General Jan Smuts is sent to Budapest to negotiate with Béla Kun.
- April 1919: The discussion between Entente representatives and Kun government are stalled, as Kun requests that the Romanian Army fall back to the Mureș (Maros) river. More information about the anti-Romanian repression in the Romanian-inhabited areas still under Hungarian control reaches Bucharest. The Romanian Army is ordered by the Romanian government to prepare a general offensive for 16 April 1919, to force the Hungarian authorities to comply with the Allied council decision on 28 February concerning the new demarcation line. The battle plans are even more bold: according to them the overall advance is to stop only at the Tisza river.
- 15 April 1919, evening: Hungarian troops organize a preemptive strike against the Romanian Army in western Transylvania.
- 16–19 April 1919: Violent battles take place in the Apuseni Mountains, eventually won by the Romanian troops (five divisions), which broke through the front lines into the Crișana Plain.
- 19 April 1919: Following their successful counter-offensive against the Hungarian Soviet Republic, Romanian troops enter Carei (Nagykároly) and Satu Mare (Szatmárnémeti).
- 20 April 1919: The Romanian Army enters Oradea (Nagyvárad) and Salonta (Nagyszalonta), reached the line set by the Allies in the Vix Note. However, the Romanian High Command decided to go over this line and advance to the Tisza river, for military reasons: Tisza makes a natural obstacle that is easy to defend, and at the same time the Hungarian Army was beaten but not destroyed. By doing so, the Romanians went against the wishes of the Allies.
- 1 May 1919: The Romanian Army reaches the river Tisza.
- 17 May 1919: Romanian army units enter Arad.
- June–July 1919: The Council of the Great Powers asks the Romanian government to retreat its troops to the (second) demarcation line and invites Béla Kun to Paris. Romania answers negative, and says it would agree to the demand if the Communist Hungarian Army is disarmed and demobilized. Béla Kun refuses this condition.
- 17 July 1919: Béla Kun orders a counter-offensive against the Romanian Army.
- 20 July 1919: The Hungarian Army crosses the Tisza; violent battles take place.
- 26 July 1919: The Hungarian offensive fails and the Romanian Army pushes the Hungarian troops back to the Tisza. Many prisoners of war are captured and Romania annexes part of Banat.
- 6 August 1919: French-supported Romanian forces enter Budapest. The Communist government of Hungary collapses and its leaders flee.
- 4 November 1919: Romanian occupation of Budapest ends.

=== Banat ===
- Treaty with Yugoslavia
- 3 August 1919: Romanian troops enter Timișoara (Temesvár).
- Elections, Văitoianu and Vaida governments
- Negotiations with Czechoslovakia, agrarian reform
- Averescu government, treaties with Hungary and Czechoslovakia

=== Versailles Treaty ===
In 1920, by the Treaty of Trianon, 102,813 km^{2} (39,696 sq mi) of the Kingdom of Hungary became part of the Kingdom of Romania. This territory was smaller than that promised by the Treaty of Bucharest or claimed by the declaration of union in 1918, or demanded officially by the Romanian Government in the peace conference.

The treaty is now commemorated in Romania since 2020 as the Trianon Treaty Day.

=== The organization of Transylvania in the Kingdom of Romania ===
- 1923: King Fedinand I of Romania signs a new Constitution, which centralizes the administration and does away with the autonomy of Transylvania. Iuliu Maniu and Alexandru Vaida-Voevod declare their opposition to the King.

== See also ==
- Great Union
- Union of Bukovina with Romania
- Union of Bessarabia with Romania
- Union of Hungary and Romania (proposal)
- Greater Romania
- Kingdom of Romania
- History of Transylvania
- Congress of Oppressed Nationalities of the Austro-Hungarian Empire
