= Greater Romania =

Nation-state for all Romanian speakers

Administrative map of Romania in 1930

Greater Romania (Romanian: România Mare) was the Kingdom of Romania during the interwar period, within its borders achieved after the Great Union; or the related pan-nationalist ideal of a nation state which would incorporate all Romanian-speakers.

In 1920, after the incorporation of Transylvania, Bukovina, Bessarabia and parts of Banat, Crișana, and Maramureș, the Romanian state reached its largest peacetime geographical extent (295,049 km^{2}). Today, the concept serves as a guiding principle for the unification of Moldova and Romania.

The idea is comparable to other similar conceptions such as Greater Bulgaria, Megali Idea, Greater Yugoslavia, Greater Hungary and Greater Italy.

== Ideology ==
The theme of national identity had been always a key concern for Romanian culture and politics. The Romanian national ideology in the first decades of the twentieth century was a typical example of ethnocentric nationalism. The concept of "Greater Romania" shows similarities to the idea of national state. The Romanian territorial claims were based on "primordial racial modalities", the essential goal of them was to unify the biologically defined Romanians.

== Evolution ==
=== Before World War I ===
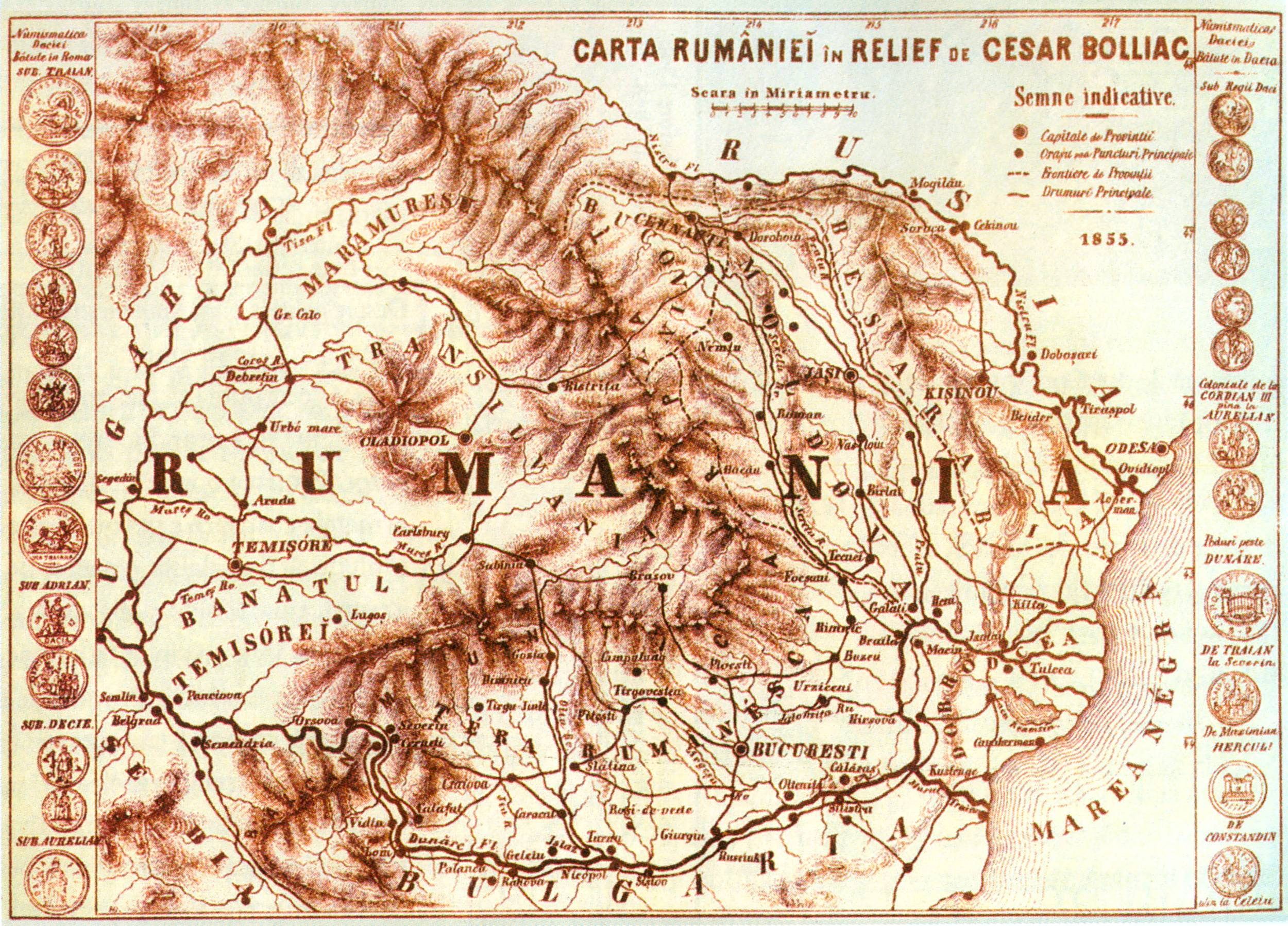
Irredentist map of hypothetical Romania from 1855 by Romanian politician Cezar Bolliac

"Long Live Greater Romania", reconstruction of the "Darnița Banner", designed in 1917; it was first flown by ethnic Romanian turncoats from the Austro-Hungarian Army, who formed a Volunteer Corps of the Romanian Army

The union of Michael the Brave, who ruled over the three principalities with Romanian population (Wallachia, Transylvania and Moldavia) for a short period of time, was viewed in later periods as the precursor of a modern Romania, a thesis which was argued by Nicolae Bălcescu. This theory became a point of reference for nationalists, as well as a catalyst for various Romanian forces to achieve a single Romanian state.

The Romanian revolution in 1848 already carried the seeds of the national dream of a unified and united Romania, though the "idea of unification" had been known from earlier works of Naum Ramniceanu (1802) and Ion Budai-Deleanu (1804). The concept owes its life to Dimitrie Brătianu, who introduced the term "Greater Romania" in 1852. The first step in unifying Romanians was to establish the United Principalities by uniting Moldavia and Wallachia in 1859, which became known as Romania since the 1866 Constitution and turned into a Kingdom in 1881, after gaining independence from the Ottoman Empire. However, before the Austro-Hungarian Compromise, the elite of the Transylvanian Romanians did not support the concept of "Greater Romania", instead they wanted only equality with the other nations in Transylvania. The concept became a political reality when, in 1881, the Romanian National Party of Transylvania gathered Romanians on a common political platform to fight together for Transylvania's autonomy. According to Livezeanu the creation of Greater Romania with "a unifying concept of nationhood" started to evolve in the late 1910s. World War I played a crucial part in the development of Romanian national consciousness.

=== World War I ===
The Treaty of Bucharest (1916) was signed between Romania and the Entente Powers on 4 (Old Style)/17 (New Style) August 1916 in Bucharest. The treaty stipulated the conditions under which Romania agreed to join the war on the side of the Entente, particularly territorial promises in Austria-Hungary. The signatories bound themselves to keep secret the contents of the treaty until a general peace was concluded.

Romanians!

The war which for the last two years has been encircling our frontiers more and more closely has shaken the ancient foundations of Europe to their depths.

It has brought the day which has been awaited for centuries by the national conscience, by the founders of the Romanian State, by those who united the principalities in the war of independence, by those responsible for the national renaissance.

It is the day of the union of all branches of our nation. Today we are able to complete the task of our forefathers and to establish forever that which Michael the Great was only able to establish for a moment, namely, a Romanian union on both slopes of the Carpathians.

For us the mountains and plains of Bukowina, where Stephen the Great has slept for centuries. In our moral energy and our valour lie the means of giving him back his birthright of a great and free Rumania from the Tisza to the Black Sea, and to prosper in peace in accordance with our customs and our hopes and dreams. (...)

Part of the proclamation by King Ferdinand, 28 August 1916

Lucian Boia summarised the territorial extent of the nationalist dream as following:

The phrase "De la Nistru pana la Tisa" (From Dniester to Tisza) is well known to Romanians, it defines the limits of an ideal Romania, though we should note that the Romanian population extends in the east beyond the Dniester, while both banks of the Tisza are completely Hungarian for most of the river's length. To the south, the Danube completes the symbolic geography of Romania: an enclosed space between 3 rivers, with an area of 300.000 sq km, comparable to that of Italy or the British Isles. Rivers then are perceived as natural borders, separating Romanians from Others.

=== Interwar Romania ===
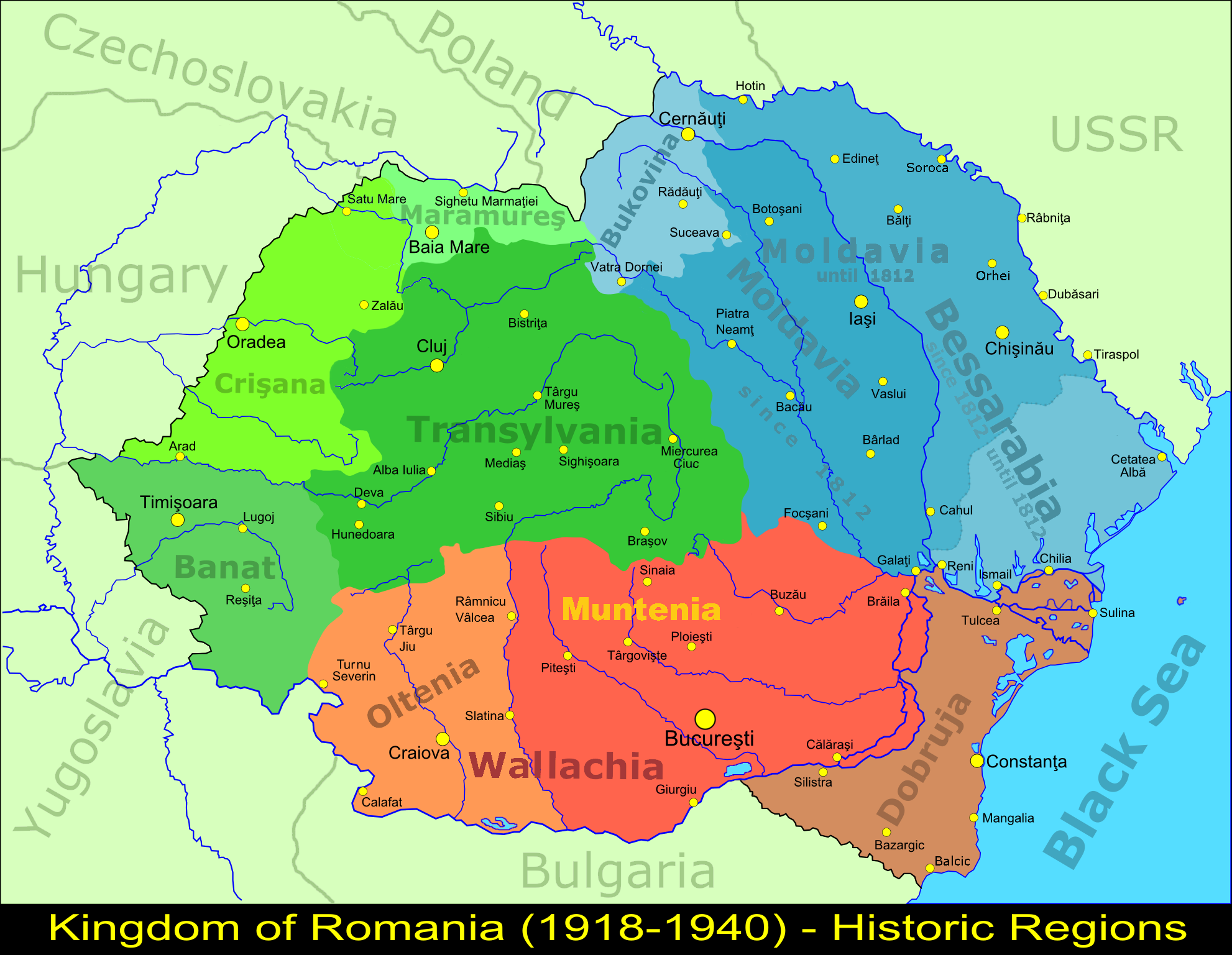
Regions of the Kingdom of Romania (1918–1940)

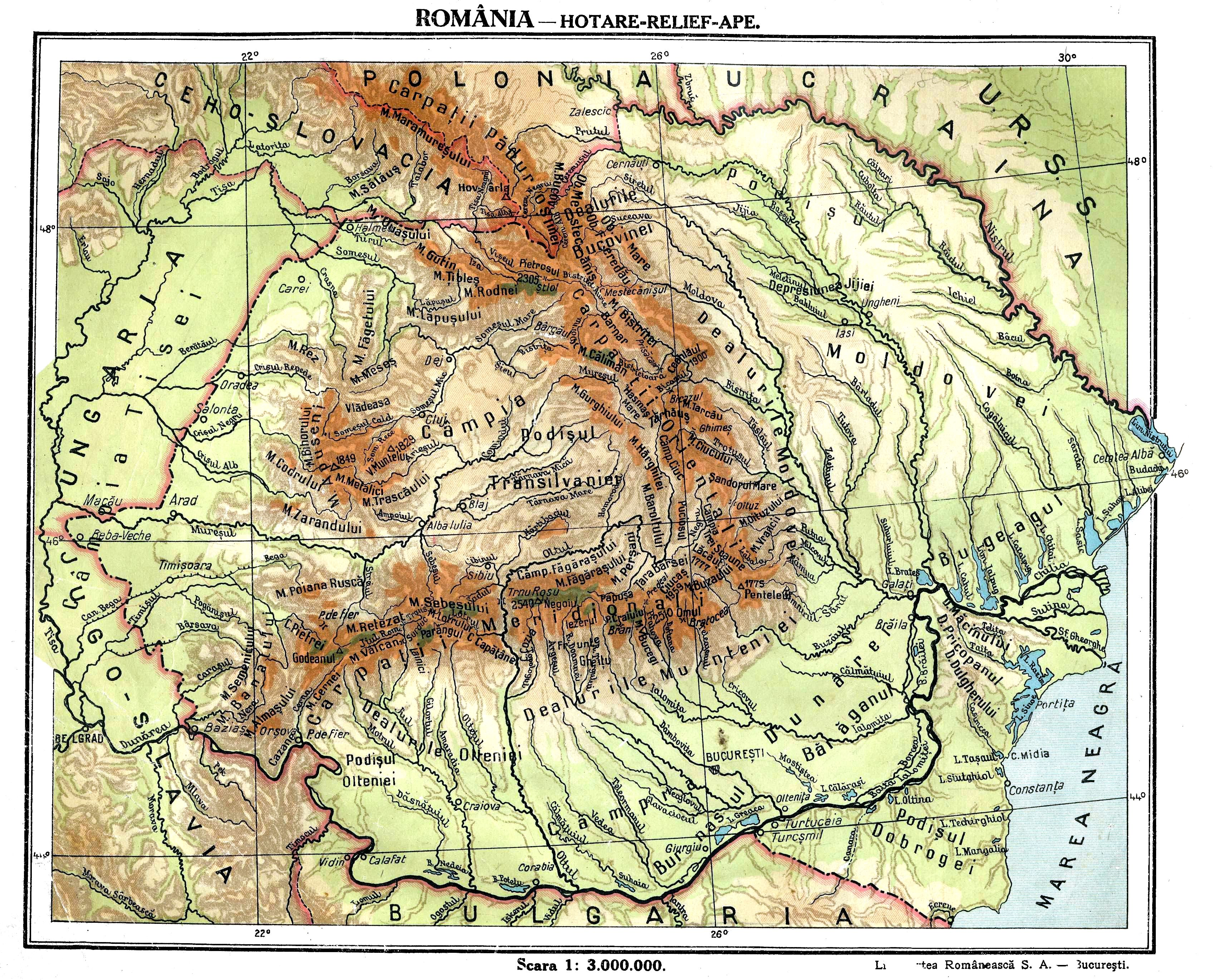
Physical map of Greater Romania (1933)

The concept of "Greater Romania" materialized as a geopolitical reality after the First World War. Romania gained control over Bessarabia, Bukovina and Transylvania. The borders established by the treaties concluding the war did not change until 1940. The resulting state, often referred to as "România Mare" or, alternatively, as Romanian: România Întregită (roughly translated in English as "Romania Made Whole," or "Entire Romania"), was seen as the 'true', whole Romanian state, or, as Tom Gallagher states, the "Holy Grail of Romanian nationalism". Its constitution, proclaimed in 1923, "largely ignored the new ethnic and cultural realities".

The Romanian ideology changed due to the demographic, cultural and social alterations, however the nationalist desire for a homogeneous Romanian state conflicted with the multiethnic, multicultural truth of Greater Romania. The ideological rewriting of the role of "spiritual victimization", turning it into "spiritual police", was a radical and challenging task for the Romanian intellectuals because they had to entirely revise the national identity and the destiny of the Romanian nation. In accordance with this view, Livezeanu states that the Great Union created a "deeply fragmented" interwar Romania where the determination of national identity met with great difficulties mainly because of the effects of the hundred years of political separation. Due to the inability of the government to solve the problems of the Transylvanian Romanians' integration and the effects of the worldwide and national economic depression, "the population gradually lost its faith in the democratic conception of Greater Romania".

The Great Depression in Romania, which started in 1929, destabilised the country. The early 1930s were marked by social unrest, high unemployment, and strikes. In several instances, the Romanian government violently repressed strikes and riots, notably the 1929 miners' strike in Valea Jiului and the strike in the Grivița railroad workshops. In the mid-1930s, the Romanian economy recovered and the industry grew significantly, although about 80% of Romanians were still employed in agriculture. French economic and political influence was predominant in the early 1920s but then Germany became more dominant, especially in the 1930s.

==== Territorial changes ====
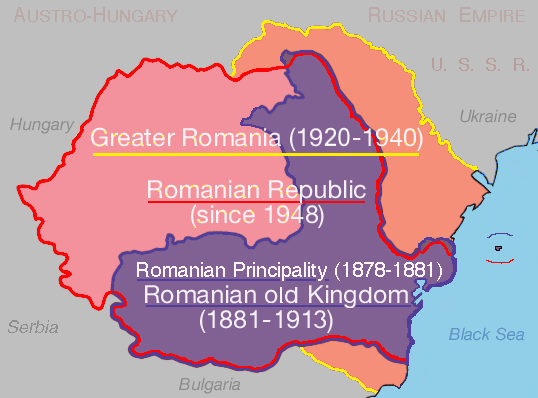
Extension of Romanian Kingdom after the First World War

===== Bessarabia =====
Bessarabia declared its sovereignty as the Moldavian Democratic Republic in 1917 by the newly formed "Council of the Country" ("Sfatul Țării"). The state was faced with the disorderly retreat through its territory of Russian troops from disbanded units. In January 1918, the "Sfatul Țării" called on Romanian troops to protect the province from the Bolsheviks who were spreading the Russian Revolution. After declaring independence from Russia on 24 January 1918, the "Sfatul Țării" voted for union with Romania on 9 April 1918. Of the 138 deputies in the council, 86 voted for union, 3 against, 36 abstained (mostly the deputies representing minorities, 52% of the population at the time) and 13 were not present. The United Kingdom, France, Italy and Japan recognized the incorporation of Bessarabia through the Treaty of Paris. The United States and the Soviet Union however refused to do so, the latter maintaining a claim to the territory for the whole interwar period. Furthermore, Japan failed to ratify the treaty, which therefore never entered into force.

===== Bukovina =====
In Bukovina, after being occupied by the Romanian Army, a National Council voted for union with Romania. While the Romanian, German, and Polish deputies unanimously voted for union, the Ukrainian deputies (representing 38% of the population according to the 1910 Austrian census) and Jewish deputies did not attend the council. The unification was ratified in the Treaty of Saint-Germain-en-Laye.

===== Transylvania =====
On 1 December 1918, the Great National Assembly of Alba Iulia proclaimed the union of Transylvania and other territories with Romania in Alba Iulia, adopted by the Deputies of the Romanians of Transylvania, and supported one month later by the vote of the Deputies of the Saxons of Transylvania. The Hungarians of Transylvania, about 32% at the time (including the Hungarian-speaking Jewish community), and the Germans of Banat did not elect deputies upon the dissolution of Austria-Hungary, since they were considered represented by the Budapest government of Hungary, nevertheless on 22 December 1918 the Hungarian General Assembly in Cluj (Kolozsvár) reaffirmed the loyalty of Hungarians from Transylvania to Hungary. In the 1920 Treaty of Trianon, Hungary was forced to give up all claims over Transylvania and the treaty set the new borders between the two countries.

=== World War II losses ===
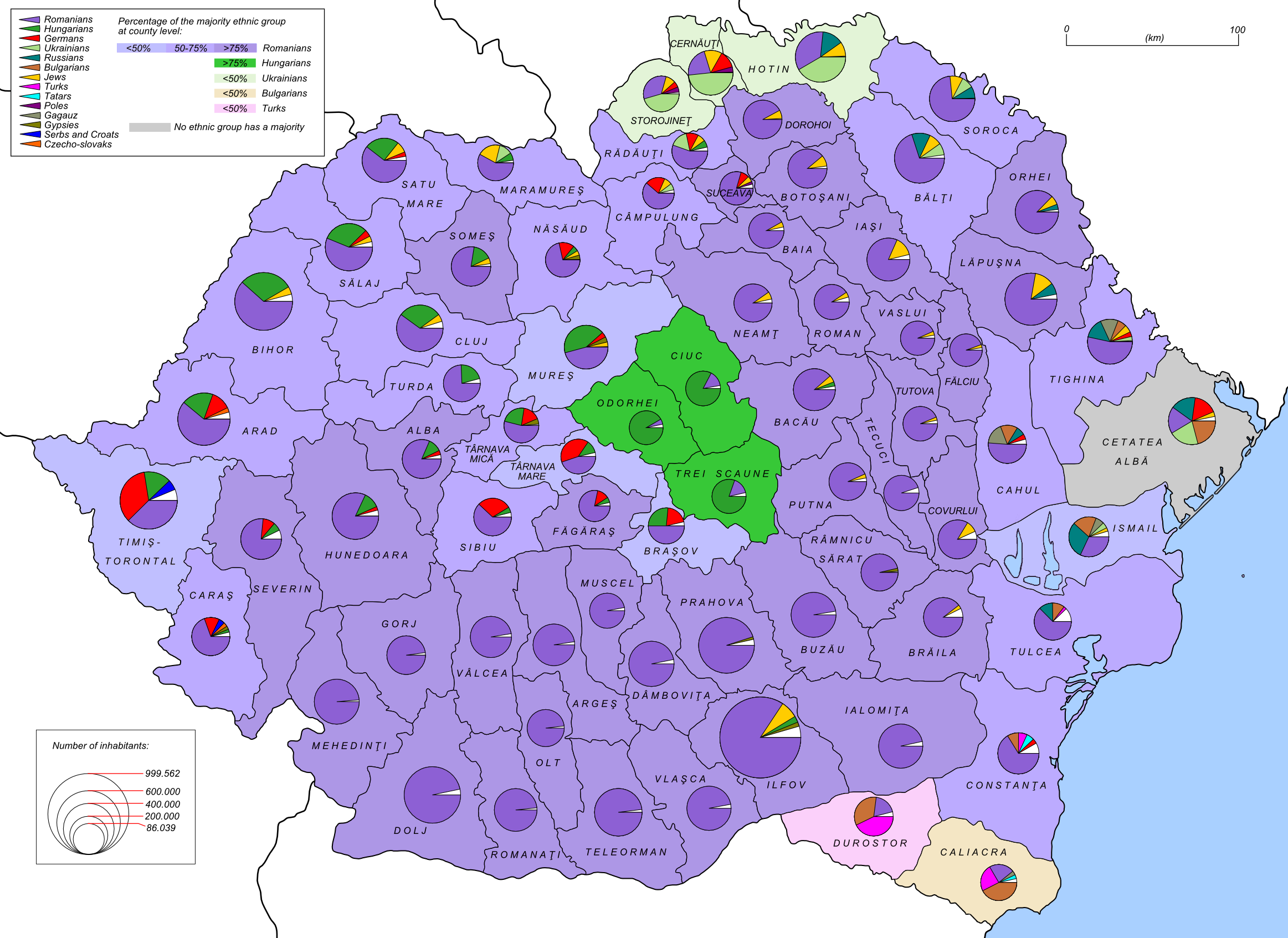
Ethnic map of interwar Romania (1930 Romanian census)

In 1940, the Romanian state agreed to cede Bessarabia to the Soviet Union, as provided for by the Molotov–Ribbentrop pact between the Soviet Union and Germany. It also lost Northern Bukovina and the Hertsa region, which were not mentioned in the pact, to the Soviet Union. It lost Northern Transylvania to Hungary, through the Second Vienna Award, and the Southern Dobruja to Bulgaria by the Treaty of Craiova. In the course of World War II, Romania, which was allied with the Axis powers, not only re-annexed Bessarabia and Northern Bukovina, but also took under administrative control lands to the east of Dniester (parts of recently formed Moldavian SSR, and of Odessa and Vinnytsia oblasts of Ukrainian SSR), creating Transnistria Governorate.

Population structure in Romania (Transnistria Governorate included) according to the 1941 Romanian census.

Despite clear Ukrainian majority in the governorate's ethnic composition, demonstrated by a census conducted in December 1941, Romanian government hoped to annex it eventually as a "compensation" for Northern Transylvania lost to Hungary.

These territories were lost again when the tide of the war turned. After the war, Romania regained the Transylvanian territories lost to Hungary, but not territory lost to Bulgaria or the Soviet Union. In 1948 a treaty between the Soviet Union and Soviet-occupied Communist Romania also provided for the transfer of four uninhabited islands to the Soviet Union, three in the Danube Delta and Snake Island in the Black Sea.

=== After World War II ===
After the war, the concept was interpreted as "obsolete" because of the Romanian defeat. However, even the Communist politicians between 1944 and 1947 plainly supported the re-establishment of Greater Romania. Gheorghe Apostol's reminiscence strengthens the view for the nationalist argument of the Communists at the negotiations with Stalin about the future of Northern Transylvania. In contrast with this view, Romsics quotes Valter Roman, one of the heads of the Romanian Communist Party, as writing in his memo of April 1944: "the two parts of Transylvania should be reunited as an independent state."

The Romanian Communist politicians' behavior were depicted as nationalist, and this circumstance brought about the concept of National Communism, which amalgamated elements of Stalinism and Fascism. According to Trond Gilberg the regime needed the strongly nationalist attitude because of the social, economic and political challenges. After the retreat of the Soviet troops from Romania in 1958, the national ideology was reborn, however it raises questions about its reconcilability with internationalist communism. Nicolae Ceaușescu fancied the idea that the creation of Greater Romania was the fruit of the end of the nation-formation process.

The setting up of the (Romanian) unitary national state six and a half decades ago was a brilliant historic victory of the long heroic struggle of the masses for creating the Romanian nation and the coming true of the age old dream of all Romanians to live in unity within the borders of the same country, in one free and independent state.

— Ceaușescu, 1983

=== Recent developments ===
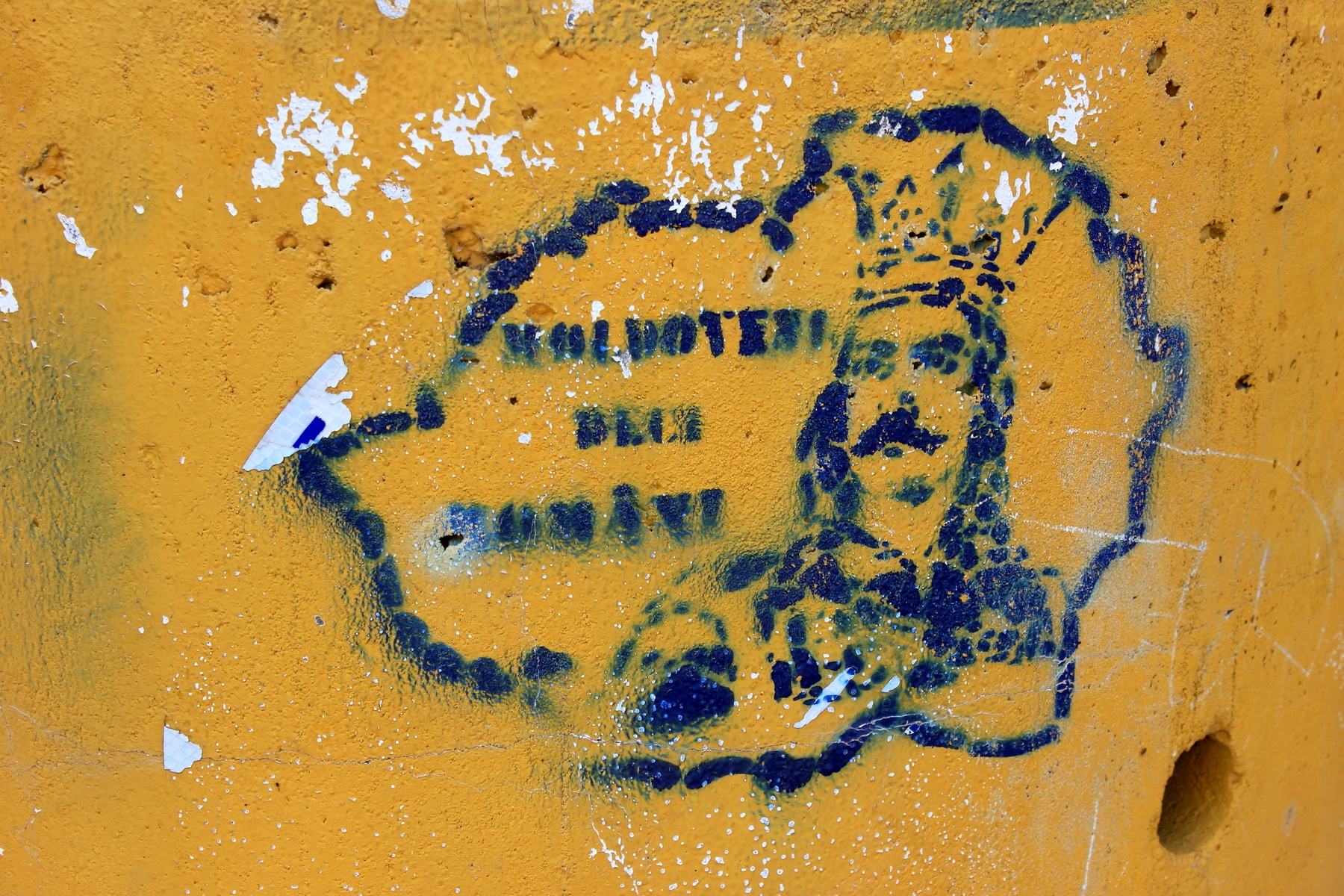
Graffiti with the shape of Greater Romania near Briceni, Moldova

The fall of the communist regimes in Eastern Europe and the Soviet Union and the economic downturn accompanying it led to a resurgence of nationalism in the region. Romania and Moldova, state comprising the bulk of Bessarabia which had become independent after the dissolution of the Soviet Union, confronted with their eastern neighbor, Ukraine. Bucharest and Chișinău announced territorial claims on Ukrainian lands (on parts of Chernivtsi and Odessa regions). Bulgaria surmised that the concept of Greater Romania stood behind Romanian foreign policy toward Moldova therefore expressed concerns about possible developments on Dobruja.

In 1992, the issue on unification of Moldova and Romania was negotiated between the Romanian and Moldovan governments and they wanted to achieve it by the end of the year. However, the "unionists" lost their dominance in Moldova in the middle of the year. Bucharest admitted the existence of the two Romanian states (Romania and Moldova) and defined priorities in reference to this matter: "the creation of a common cultural space; the creation of an economically integrated zone; and gradual political integration". The Moldovan Snegur government became more pragmatic and realized that the nationalist propaganda from Bucharest did not help their aims especially on the problem of "Soviet annexed Bessarabia". The Romanian organizations ignored the result of the Moldovan referendum on independence because the referendum did not ask Romanians in Romania. Romanian politicians blamed Russia and the Moldovan regime that unification became unreal. According to Edward Ozhiganov (Head of the Division for Ethnopolitical Research at the Analytical Center of the Federation Council in Russia), the armed conflict in Moldova was due to the Romanian ethnic nationalism, in other words, "the attempt to create a unitary, ethnic state with power concentrated in the hands of ethnic nationalists in what was actually a multiethnic society." Furthermore, Bucharest's behavior toward Ukraine did not change until 1997 when Romanian politicians realized that resolving border disputes was a precondition for NATO membership.

Present-day Romanian irredentists (such as members of PRM) aim to take possession of territories of northern Bukovina and Bessarabia. These regions currently belong to Ukraine and Moldova. The Russian presence and the tense political situation in Moldova also inflame their demands. Nevertheless, radicals make territorial demands on Hungary too. The Greater Romania Party (Partidul România Mare – PRM) is an emblematic representative of the aforesaid concept, though the conception is fostered also by other right-wing groups (e.g. the organisation of the New Right –Noua Dreaptă). Today, the phrase "Bessarabia, Romanian land" (Basarabia, pământ românesc, with several variations) is commonly used in Romania, and it poses territorial claims over the region of Bessarabia. It is also used in Moldova.

As of 2024 Alliance for the Union of Romanians (AUR) supports the unification of Moldova and Romania. While S.O.S. Romania leader Diana Iovanovici Șoșoacă proposed a law in 2023 for a project on the Romanian Parliament for the annexation by Romania of Northern Bukovina, the Hertsa region, Budjak, Northern Maramureș and Snake Island from Ukraine, as they were "historical territories" that belong to Romania as stated in the law project. In retaliation, Ukraine announced it would impose sanctions against Iovanovici Șoșoacă, labeling her as a threat to Ukrainian national security.

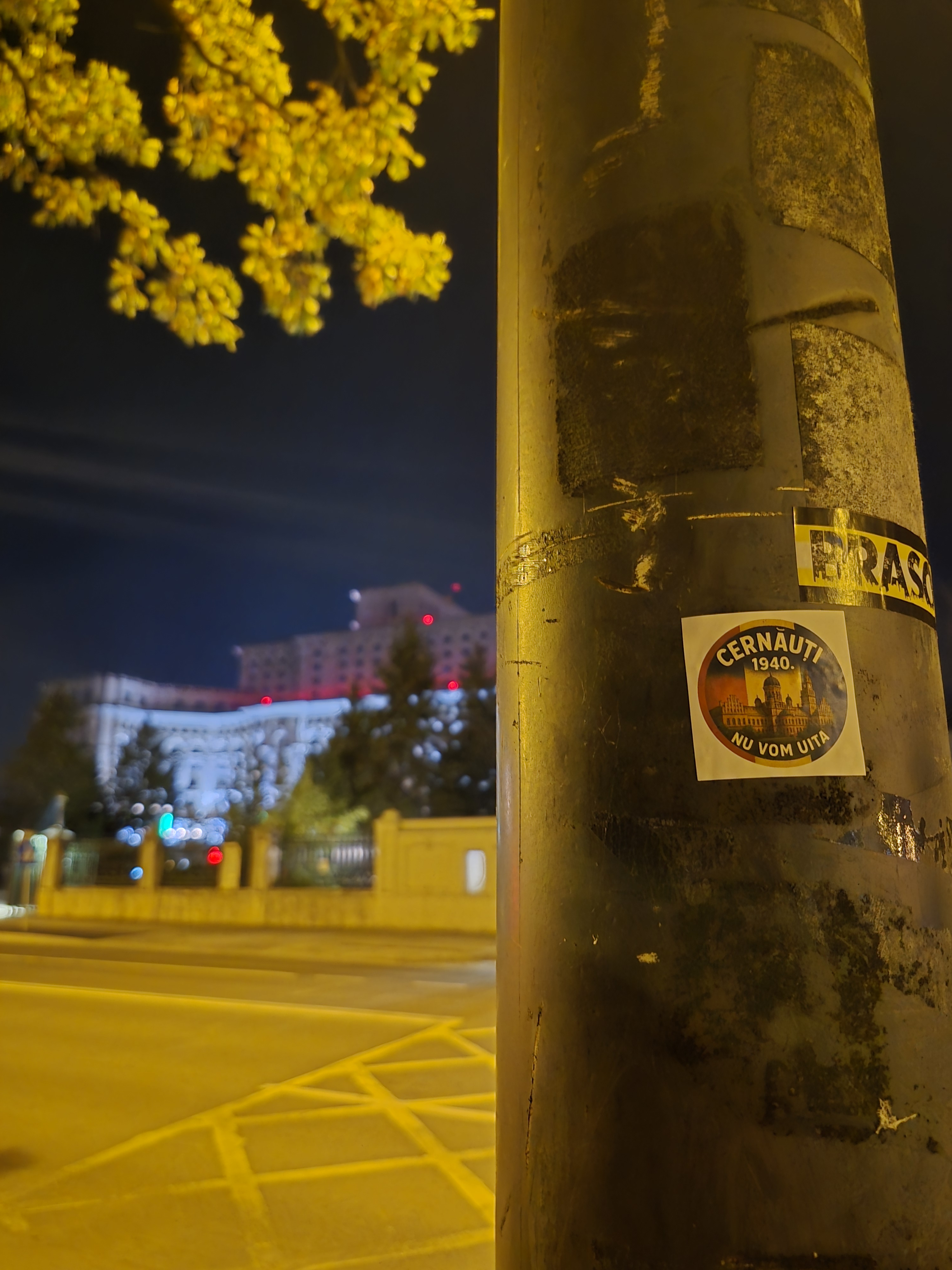
Sticker in Bucharest, near the Palace of the Parliament, with the following text: "Chernivtsi. 1940. We will not forget", as a reference to the 1940 Soviet occupation of Bessarabia and Northern Bukovina

== Policies ==
=== Domestic policy ===
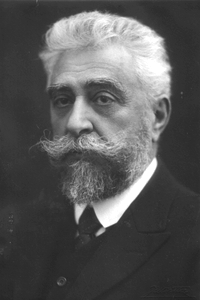
Ion I. C. Brătianu, many times prime minister and the main figure of the National Liberal Party (PNL), controlled postwar Romanian politics until his death in 1927, thanks in part to his influence with King Ferdinand I. Shortly after his death, the PNL entered into crisis.

The image of the Conservative Party, which dominated the Government presided over by Alexandru Marghiloman during the occupation by the Central Powers of the south of the country, was tarnished by the signing of a peace treaty unfavorable to the nation, its attempts not to carry out the agrarian reform, and its reputation for collaborationism -despite the fact that it agreed its measures with King Ferdinand I-. In the elections of November 1919 the party, converted into the "Conservative-Progressive" party, almost disappeared: it obtained only 3.8% of the vote after the beginning of the agrarian reform, which had weakened it definitively. The new situation, in which the traditional two-party system sustained by the Conservative Party and the National Liberal Party disappeared with the collapse of the former, misleadingly favored the National Liberals, who had difficulty maintaining their traditional power.

==== The postwar period and agrarian reform ====
After a new government by the Liberal leader Ionel Brătianu between November 1918 and September 1919, another was established under General Artur Văitoianu, who held elections in November with male universal suffrage for the first time; these elections marked the beginning of a new political landscape in which the apparently victorious forces were new parties: the Transylvanian Romanian National Party, the peasant Peasants' Party of Mihalache, and the right-wing Nationalist Democratic Party of the historian Nicolae Iorga. The victors formed a coalition Government that tried to promulgate a deeper agrarian reform, which led to its fall.

==== The return of the Liberals ====
The Liberals regained power in 1922 and approved a new Constitution the following year, according to the opposition not with the aim of unifying the legislation of all the territories of the country, but of facilitating the perpetuation of the Liberals in power. Powers were granted to the monarch, close to the Liberals, which, together with the structure of the Senate, could effectively facilitate the political control of the Liberals. In 1926 the Constitution was supplemented with an electoral law inspired by Italian fascism -the Acerbo Law- that granted 50% of the seats to the party that obtained 40% of the vote. This law forced parties into strange alliances to achieve the aforementioned percentage and increased the danger that, once in power, they would use corruption to recoup the great expenses caused by maintaining extensive representation throughout the country, necessary to have a chance of achieving so broad a victory. The Liberals also approved a series of laws that caused a large part of the economic resources of the new territories to pass into the hands of their supporters and eliminated any autonomy of the territories. These maneuvers displeased the opposition, especially that of Transylvanian origin, and quickly wore down the Government's image, which tried to maintain power while apparently ceding the Government to General Alexandru Averescu, who remained at its head between March 1926 and June 1927, dependent on the favor of the Liberals. After attempting a series of maneuvers against them, Averescu was dismissed by the king, at the request of the PNL, which resumed power.

The Liberal leader Ionel Brătianu returned briefly to head the cabinet, but his death that same year, together with that of the sovereign, always close to the Liberals, led to the definitive crisis of the party. After a brief extension in power with Ionel's brother, Vintilă Brătianu, at the head, the hardening of the opposition's stance and popular disenchantment caused the regency to decide to entrust the formation of a new Government to the principal opposition leader, the National Peasant Iuliu Maniu.

==== The National Peasant governments and Carol's return ====
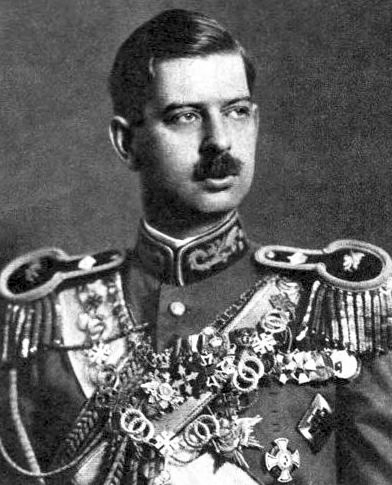
Carol II, monarch during the 1930s and the main political figure of the period. He controlled the country's internal policy almost from his return to the country in 1930 and foreign policy from 1936, after the replacement of the pro-Allied foreign minister Nicolae Titulescu. His attempt to maintain a position of balance among the great powers failed.

After the difficulties of the Government of the heir of the PNL Vintilă Brătianu in remaining in power and with the traditional option of replacing his Government with an allied one of General Averescu discredited, the Regency Council decided, to general surprise, to accept Brătianu's resignation and entrust the formation of a Government to the main opposition figure, Iuliu Maniu. He took office on 10 November 1928 and approved a series of well-received measures, such as the abolition of martial law and censorship, the purge of the sinister gendarmerie, and only partially successful attempts at reform of the civil service corps and decentralization of the Public Administration. In December, free elections gave his party a large absolute majority. The final granting of the stabilization credit that Brătianu had failed to obtain allowed him to apply certain modernizing measures.

The previous Liberal policy of total primacy of industry gave way to measures favorable to agriculture and its exports, which soon ran up against the collapse of world trade due to the Great Depression. Some measures of the Government, moreover, identified it with its predecessors: the readiness to suppress any left-wing movement with rigor, the replacement of one of the regents, deceased, by another clearly favorable to the new Government, the maintenance of the electoral bonus for the party that reached 40% of the vote, etc.

The surprise return to the country of Prince Carol on 6 June 1930 complicated the situation: his accession to the throne was at first accepted by the National Peasants, who thought of using him as the Liberals had done with his father, but he soon showed little inclination to be a mere figure and not hold the reins of power. Maniu took advantage of his opposition to the return of the king's mistress to resign four months after Carol's return. Despite the National Peasants' Party's preference for their vice-president, Ion Mihalache, they had to accept the replacement of Maniu by a minor figure of the party, Gheorghe Mironescu, who remained precariously in power until April 1931, after securing the last major international credit for the country, but having in return to apply harsh deflationary measures, very unpopular. Carol thus began his campaign to discredit and disintegrate the traditional parties that would lead at the end of the decade to the establishment of a royal dictatorship. During his decade on the throne, he had twenty-five governments with eighteen prime ministers and sixty-one ministers, in addition to nine chiefs of the General Staff.

After Mironescu's replacement, the king tried to substitute the Governments supported by parties with one of personalities that would rely on him and appointed the famous historian Nicolae Iorga prime minister in April 1931. The experiment turned out to be a failure and Carol returned to the short-lived National Peasant cabinets that definitively plunged the party into crisis. Iorga held the most corrupt elections of the period, failed to pull the country out of the crisis, and applied ineffective measures. During his tenure the Iron Guard (founded as the Legion of Saint Michael the Archangel) obtained its first seats.

The prime minister who alternated with Maniu at the head of the last National Peasant cabinets, Alexandru Vaida-Voevod, increasingly leaned toward the growing far right and shortly afterward left the party to form his own tiny radical right-wing xenophobic formation.

==== Carol's Liberal governments ====
After breaking the prestige of the National Peasants, Carol proceeded to foster dissensions in the other great Romanian party, the National Liberal Party (PNL). He appointed as president of the Council of Ministers the hard-line Ion G. Duca, who rigged the elections to ensure himself an absolute majority and resolutely confronted the Iron Guard, arresting eighteen thousand of its members and allowing the gendarmerie to mistreat hundreds and murder a couple of dozen. On 29 December 1933, Duca was assassinated by members of the Guard, who were subsequently acquitted by a military court.

He was replaced by another Liberal not belonging to the leadership of the PNL -again as a maneuver by the king to divide the party- Gheorghe Tătărescu, who confronted the members of the Brătianu family who then directed the party, Gheorghe Brătianu and Constantin I. C. Brătianu. Tătărescu was the only prime minister to serve a full four-year term; he applied an increasingly authoritarian policy of submission to the monarch and unofficial encouragement of the Iron Guard. In 1934 a youth organization modeled on those of the fascist countries was created and in 1936 a program of compulsory labor brigades and another of rearmament began.

His long government was also characterized by a certain economic improvement, which did not, however, reach the great mass of poor peasants. The increase in demand for Romanian oil, the good harvests of 1936 and 1937, and financial reform made it possible to have a surplus, and a new industrialization campaign was carried out, basically by encouraging heavy industry and the arms industry. Its failure to improve the conditions of the humble peasants gave rise to increasing popular sympathy for the National Peasants and radical right-wing movements, above all for the Iron Guard, which promised a radical change in the situation in favor of the peasants.

With a program that assured each social sector what it wanted to hear, the Guard gained followers both in the countryside and in the city, among the small working class dissatisfied with the passive trade unions and the crisis-ridden bourgeoisie (unemployed university graduates, badly paid military men, dismissed civil servants...). It often received covert support from the Government and its relationship with power was ambiguous.

In December 1937, faced with the need to hold elections because of the end of the legislature, Tătărescu tried to forge a coalition that would allow him to remain in power. Opposed to this was an electoral pact among Maniu, the Guard, and the Liberals of Gheorghe Brătianu, which tried to prevent Tătărescu from rigging the elections to perpetuate himself in office. The Government, despite winning a majority, failed to obtain the 40% of votes necessary to assure itself the seat bonus that would have guaranteed it an absolute majority, an unprecedented situation that occurred for the first time in the interwar period.

==== Goga's government and the royal dictatorship ====
Faced with the surprising tie between the forces favorable to the government and those of the opposition and the king's refusal to entrust the government to the latter, the sovereign chose to call upon the party of Octavian Goga, which had obtained only 9.15% of the vote. This formation had the advantage of being both loyal to the monarch and of having an ultraright nationalist ideology similar to that of the popular Iron Guard, so that it could become the popular platform on which the king's power would rest. The experiment was a failure: the new Government launched itself into a fierce antisemitic policy that nearly broke the national economy in the face of the Jews' boycott, seriously tarnished the country's image abroad, and received severe criticism from the United Kingdom, France, and the Soviet Union.

After thirty-four days at the head of the Government and in view of the electoral agreement between Goga and Codreanu that made the king fear the possible loss of his control of national politics, he dismissed Goga and implemented the royal dictatorship, establishing a concentration Government headed by the Orthodox patriarch Miron Cristea and containing former figures of Romanian politics as well as numerous technical ministers. A few days later, a new Constitution of authoritarian character was promulgated that increased the powers of the monarch, reduced those of Parliament, and suppressed civil liberties and the separation of powers. The parties were dissolved, but in practice they survived underground.

The new Government concentrated on monopolizing power and ending the threat of the Iron Guard, with the tacit support of the traditional parties. Numerous measures were approved against the Legion and Codreanu, incapable of reaching an agreement with the authorities or rising up, submitted to the Government's measures. Through a trick by the Government, he was arrested on 17 April 1938 together with numerous other leaders of the movement. Tried twice, Codreanu was sentenced in the latter trial to ten years of hard labor for high treason. The Munich crisis stirred the king's desire to finish off Codreanu and his organization. On his return from Germany, where he had sensed threats from Hitler after his trip around Europe at the end of November, Carol decided to eliminate Codreanu and gave the order before even arriving in the country. On 30 November, Codreanu was murdered together with other prisoners, in an execution presented as a failed escape attempt. A harsh wave of repression followed that caused some militants to reconcile themselves with the authorities, abandoning a movement in crisis after the disappearance of its leader.

In the winter of 1938–1939, clashes between the disorganized remnants of the Guard and the security forces followed one another. After the outbreak of the Second World War, in which Romania declared itself neutral, the Guard managed to assassinate the prime minister and strongman of the regime, Armand Călinescu, on 21 September 1939, holding him responsible for Codreanu's death. The king's response was brutal: he ordered the execution of 252 legionaries, all the organization's command cadres in prison.

At the same time as efforts were made to suppress the Guard, an attempt was made to establish a single-party system with fascist overtones which, although it did not arouse great popular support, served as a facade for the regime, the National Renaissance Front, with a right-wing populist and antisemitic program, which barely concealed a situation of great corruption associated with the circles of power, both among the landowners and among the new industrialists.

The crisis and fall of the regime was not due to internal protests or to the opposition of the Guard, but to the international situation, which caused the king's foreign policy to fail, forcing him in the summer of 1940 to accept successive territorial losses that made his position untenable in September. The king tried in vain to rely on Ion Antonescu to remain in power; the latter managed to force him to abdicate and go into exile at the beginning of the month, after a failed coup by the Guard.

==== Antonescu's rise and the coalition with the Iron Guard ====
Lacking popular support, but with prestige in the Army, Antonescu was forced to form an unstable coalition with the popular Iron Guard, in the face of the traditional parties' renewed refusal to join a Government of national concentration. The talks to establish the new cabinet began on 6 September, but were not concluded until the 14th, because of differences over the distribution of portfolios between the two parties. The new Government hastened, however, to accept the Second Vienna Award that had ended the royal regime, to try to gain Italo-German favor and given the difficulty of opposing it by arms.

Disagreements between the two government partners soon emerged: while Antonescu was a military man in favor of law and order and of a rapid but peaceful and orderly renewal of the country, the Guard sought the establishment of a totalitarian state under its control and revenge against its former oppressors. Soon the excesses and abuses of the new legionary police and the "Romanianization commissions" strained relations between the Legion and Antonescu.

Tension increased enormously after the prison murders of sixty-four former political leaders and officials at the hands of the Guard. Faced with the decision to transfer their custody to the Army and move them to another prison, the legionary detachments decided to execute the prisoners on the night of 26 November. Former prime minister Nicolae Iorga and the secretary-general of the PNŢ, Virgil Madgearu, were also murdered by Guard commandos. Other prominent politicians saved their lives only through the Army's rapid intervention. Two days after these events, Antonescu approved harsh measures to end the disorders caused by the Legionaries.

Throughout December and the beginning of January, the relationship between the legionaries and Antonescu continued to deteriorate. On 9 January 1941, Antonescu requested an interview with Hitler through the German ambassador to discuss, among other matters, the political situation in the country, and left for Berlin on the 14th.

==== Suppression of the Guard and military dictatorship ====
Antonescu intended to convince Hitler of the scant reliability of the new legionary leadership, while the latter wished to secure Romanian cooperation for the forthcoming operations against Greece in support of the failed Italian invasion. Hitler assured Antonescu that Germany gave priority to its relationship with the general over its contacts with the Guard and that he believed him to be the only man capable of guiding the country. Antonescu returned to Romania certain of the German dictator's support for his intention of getting rid of the Guard.

On 18 January 1941, he ordered the dissolution of the "Romanianization" commissions and two days later replaced the minister of the Interior, the head of the national police and of the capital, and the prefects, almost all members of the Guard. It counterattacked with major protests and the demand for an exclusively legionary Government. The authorities dismissed by Antonescu barricaded themselves in their offices and the legionaries began to occupy other official buildings and attack the Jewish population. The disturbances, looting, attacks, and murders continued during 21 and 22 January, with scant resistance from Antonescu, from whom they even demanded surrender. German troops recommended surrender to the insurgents and German foreign minister Ribbentrop advised Antonescu to take harsh measures to put down the revolt. On the afternoon of the 23rd, the general ordered the Army to crush the rebellion, which it accomplished in a few hours.

After once again failing to form a cabinet with the traditional parties, Antonescu formed a military Government on 27 January 1941. On 14 February the National Legionary State established in September 1940 was officially abolished, while the persecution of the Guard and those implicated in the January rebellion continued.

In the same month of February, the creation of any type of association in the country and the holding of meetings were prohibited; in March Antonescu won a plebiscite of support for his policy, without opposition. In the same month, the general promised Marshal Göring an increase in the Romanian supply of oil to the Reich in exchange for technical assistance and an increase in its price.

=== Foreign policy ===
Because of its very significant territorial and population gains after the First World War, the principal and permanent objective of the foreign policy of the various Romanian Governments, democratic or not, was the maintenance of the territorial distribution that emerged from the war, "respect for the existing territorial order in Europe and the defense of the country's borders".

The territories acquired after the war were the object, especially on the eve of the Second World War, of territorial claims by the States that had lost them or their successors: the Soviet Union did not recognize the annexation of Bessarabia, Hungary maintained its desire to recover Transylvania, and Bulgaria longed to retake southern Dobruja. All these possible disputes, which intensified in the months before and after the outbreak of the Second World War, concerned the Romanian Governments.

==== Alliance with France and activity in the League of Nations ====
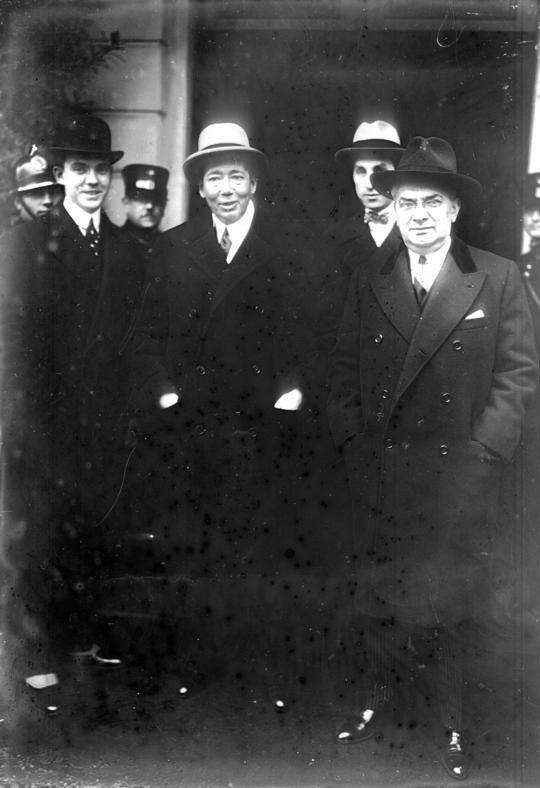
Nicolae Titulescu, wearing the light hat, the personification of Romania's pro-French policy until the mid-1930s.

During the 1920s and the first half of the 1930s, Romanian political leaders considered that the best way to preserve the territorial situation, which was favorable to them, was through rapprochement with France and support for the system of collective security identified with the League of Nations. In 1926 the country signed a treaty of friendship with France.

A series of alliances were also negotiated with the countries that had benefited from the territorial changes of the war, such as Yugoslavia and Czechoslovakia, with which the so-called Little Entente was formed between 1920 and 1921, or Poland, interested like Romania in containing the Soviet danger on their eastern borders. The Little Entente had as its essential function the prevention of any possible attack by Hungary, a country from which all three member countries had obtained territories after the World War. The pact with the Poles was signed to ensure mutual aid to the two countries in case of Soviet aggression.

Later, in 1934, a new regional alliance was created to contain the danger of territorial revision by Bulgaria; this was the so-called Balkan Pact, formed by Turkey, Greece, Yugoslavia, and Romania.

The foreign policy favorable to the League and of close alliance with France was personified in Nicolae Titulescu, Romanian foreign minister in 1927–1928 and 1932–1936, a figure of great prestige in Western countries and prominent in League of Nations activity. Titulescu reinforced the Little Entente and played a relevant role in the creation of the Balkan Entente.

In 1936, however, Titulescu's attitude favorable to collective security and France was highly discredited, both because of the League's inability to resolve international conflicts such as the Manchurian crisis, and because of the alarming lack of French response to the growth of German power. Titulescu's attempts to reach an understanding with the USSR were also not well regarded by those in power in Romania. On 29 August 1936, he was replaced at the head of the Ministry of Foreign Affairs, a change that marked the beginning of a subtle change in the country's foreign policy. It passed into the hands of the king, who decided to adopt a policy of unofficial neutrality among the great powers, favoring a rapprochement with the fascist powers while maintaining alliances with the Western democracies and disdain toward the Soviet Union.

==== Rapprochement with the Axis and policy of balance ====
The assassination of the leader of the Iron Guard Corneliu Codreanu immediately after King Carol's visit to Hitler enraged the German Government, both because of its ideological closeness to the organization and because of the possible image of complicity with the killing. The monarch decided to appease Hitler with a series of concessions, such as permitting the German minority to enter the single party, the FRN, or admitting Germany to the board that regulated traffic on the Danube (2 March 1939), which granted the Berlin Government access to the Black Sea. With these attempts having failed, the sovereign decided to grant economic concessions, which had already been foreseen after the Munich crisis, and which were also meant to favor the growth of the Romanian economy.

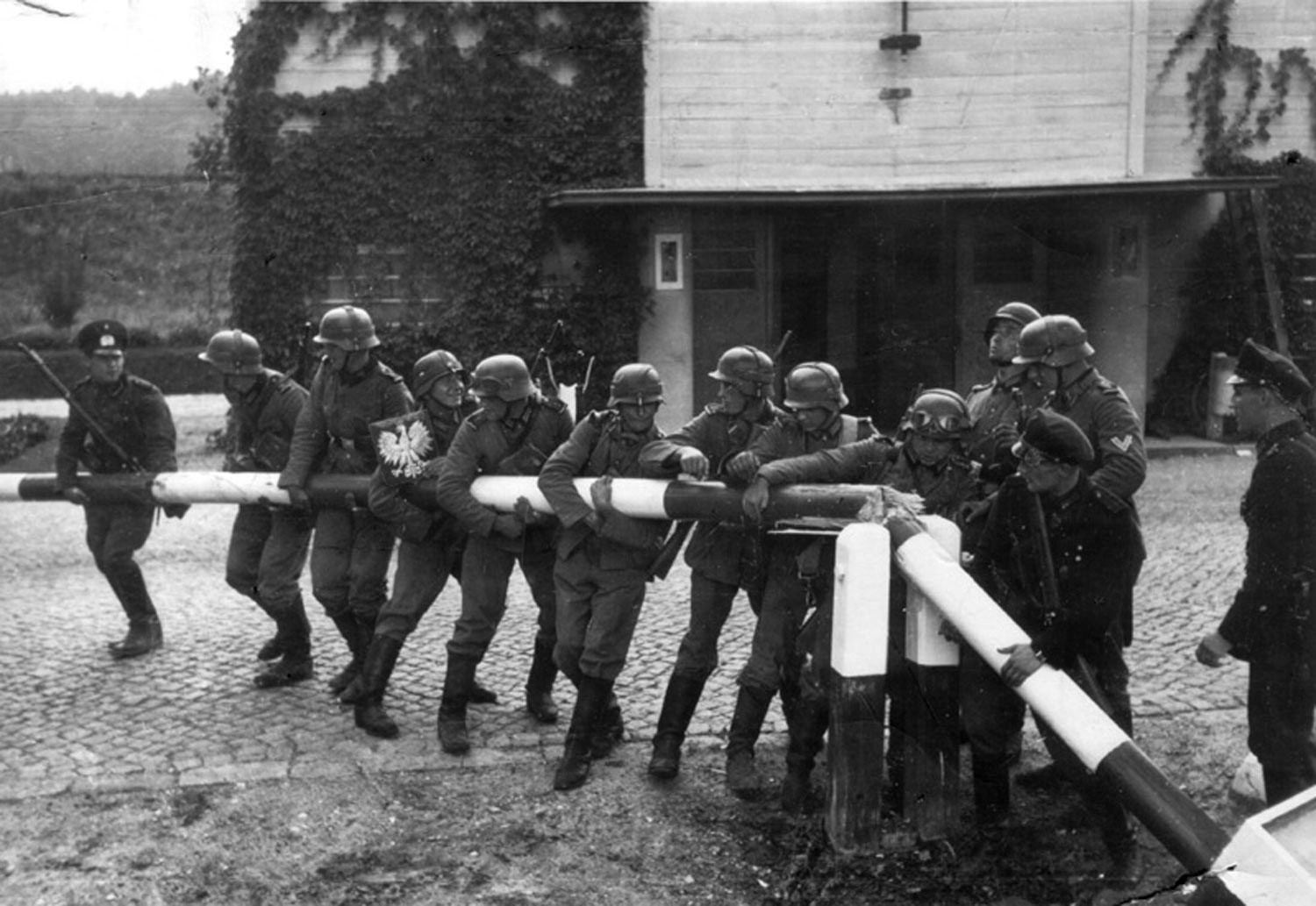
German soldiers removing the border barrier with Poland on 1 September 1939.

When the Second World War broke out with the German attack on Poland on 1 September 1939, Romania found itself in an uncomfortable position: allied with the attacked country, but with major economic relations with the Reich. After several days of doubt, the Government proclaimed neutrality in the conflict on 6 September.

Throughout the Polish campaign, the Government in Bucharest maintained an attitude of a certain sympathy toward its former partner, Poland, receiving a large number of refugees and troops, granting asylum to the Government, allowing the transit of Allied arms and advisers, and allowing a great number of interned soldiers to escape to France, despite German protests. The Germans, however, were compensated through the maintenance of supplies essential for their war industry. After the German-Soviet agreement, foreign policy was left adrift, with the Little Entente eliminated, Poland invaded, and the Western Allies increasingly distant from the Balkans. Of Romania's alliances only the Balkan Pact remained at the end of 1939.

The foreign minister, Gafencu, then tried to forge a league of neutral Balkan countries based on the Entente to pull the country out of its growing isolation. At the same time, the king tried to mediate between Germany and the Anglo-French to achieve a peace that would allow the union of these powers against the Soviet Union, which the monarch increasingly considered the greatest threat to Romania, both territorially and socially. His attempts failed and the Government then turned to the alternative project of the neutral bloc.

In the winter of 1939, the Romanian secret service began to collaborate with the German one to ensure the protection of the oil wells and navigation on the Danube, which the Allies were trying to sabotage to deprive Germany of part of its supplies. Economic cooperation with the Reich and measures against the saboteurs bore fruit in the spring of 1940. On 6 March 1940, a new trade agreement was achieved for the exchange of oil for weapons. The Finnish defeat by the Soviets in the same month caused the Government to consider a rapprochement with Germany to try to protect itself from a similar attack, although it ultimately discarded the idea for the moment.

==== Alignment with the Axis and territorial losses ====
The end of the interwar "Greater Romania": the territorial losses of the summer of 1940 destroyed the royal regime.

After the defeat of Belgium on 27 May 1940, the Romanian Government hastened to ingratiate itself with Germany, which appeared clearly victorious in the war in the west. The king had already expressed to the German ambassador on 15 May: "Romania's future depends solely on Germany". On the same day as the Belgian surrender, the exchange agreement reached the previous March was signed, by which Germany began to receive two-thirds of Romanian oil, theoretically still in the hands of Allied companies. The king's attempt at political reconciliation with the Iron Guard also began, supposedly close to Germany.

The last-minute gestures of rapprochement were poorly received by Hitler, so the Romanian Government decided to renounce the Anglo-French guarantee on 1 July and propose an alliance to the Reich. The Romanian sovereign also requested the dispatch of a German military mission. On 4 July, a new Government clearly favorable to the Axis was appointed, with Ion Gigurtu at its head, which on the 16th promised to double the oil supply to the Reich in exchange for receiving the German military advisers who were to prepare the Romanian Army in the event of an attack by its enemies, mainly the USSR.

==== The National Legionary State ====
The coalition government between General Antonescu and the Guard began with a rapprochement with Germany, both because of the latter's traditional inclination toward the fascist powers and because of the need to gain the favor of the only great power in the region that could oppose the Soviet Union. Antonescu, previously favorable to the Western powers, had gradually come to the opinion that only Germany could protect Romania against its hostile neighbors, especially the Soviets. Thus, despite its nationalism, the new Government hastened to accept the territorial losses of the Second Vienna Award.

After the cession of northern Transylvania to Hungary, incidents between Hungarians and Romanians followed one another in the region and the intervention of Italy and Germany was requested to resolve the confrontations; there was a decrease in the skirmishes between the two countries.

The advance party of the German military mission, originally requested by Carol and then by Antonescu, arrived in Romania on 10 October 1940, producing a bad impression among the Allies and their supporters. The United States blocked Romanian accounts, considering the country occupied. Antonescu, however, saw the German mission as an opportunity to reorganize and strengthen the Romanian Army and as a guarantee against a possible Soviet attack. For Hitler it was the way to protect and control the Romanian oil fields, essential for his supply.

On 28 October, in response to the successes of the German campaigns, Mussolini invaded Greece without warning Hitler. The Italian offensive was a failure and obliged Hitler to order a new campaign to help his ally and prevent the creation of British bases in the Balkans. This new situation affected Romania, since the only route to Greece, given Yugoslav neutrality, was through its territory. Antonescu signed the Tripartite Pact in Berlin on 23 November, after reaching a broad economic agreement with the Germans and indicating his intention to reverse the territorial concessions of the Second Award in the future.

==== The military dictatorship ====
During Antonescu's meeting with Hitler in mid-January 1941, in which the former obtained the German dictator's tacit support to rid himself of the Guard, the latter decided to share with him his plan for Operation Marita, approved on 13 December 1940. Antonescu showed himself willing to permit the temporary stationing of German troops in Romanian territory for the offensive against Greece and to offer the participation of Romanian armed forces if it proved necessary.

Division of the Banat among Hungary, Romania, and Yugoslavia after the First World War. The Yugoslav portion had been promised to Hungary by Germany for its participation in the attack on Yugoslavia, but, given Romanian hostility, it remained under German administration. Territory assigned to Romania Territory assigned to Yugoslavia Territory assigned to Hungary

With the Guard crushed, on 11 February 1941 the British ambassador informed Antonescu that the United Kingdom was breaking relations with Romania because of the German use of Romanian territory. Antonescu defended his permission for the entry of German troops by claiming his fear of Soviet aggression.

The plan to attack Greece continued at the beginning of the spring: Bulgaria signed a non-aggression agreement with Turkey in mid-February and the Tripartite Pact on 1 March 1941. The German units concentrated in Romania began to enter Bulgarian territory the following day; as a consequence, the United Kingdom broke relations with the Bulgarian Government on the 5th.

At the same time, the Yugoslav regent Paul Karađorđević was meeting with Hitler at Berghof to discuss his country's accession to the Tripartite Pact. Romania advised the Yugoslav Government to sign the Pact, but the latter, fearful of public opinion opposed to the Axis, declined the proposal. Constant German pressure, however, caused the Government in Belgrade finally to yield and sign the Pact on 25 March 1941. An almost bloodless coup d'etat two days later in Belgrade installed a new Government theoretically favorable to the Allies, which infuriated Hitler, who ordered the invasion of the country despite the subsequent statements of the new Government about its willingness to respect the newly signed agreement. Romania refused to participate in the invasion of Yugoslavia, but showed itself willing to occupy the Yugoslav part of the Banat in the event that Hungarian troops entered the territory. Given Antonescu's aggressive stance, the Germans decided to keep the territory under German occupation instead of ceding it to Hungary as they had planned. On 5 April, the German representative in Bucharest privately informed Antonescu of the German intention to begin the simultaneous attack on Greece and Yugoslavia the next day.

Despite his previous statements, on 23 April Antonescu delivered to the German ambassador the Romanian request for annexation of the formerly Yugoslav Banat. He also claimed autonomy for the Aromanian minority of Macedonia and the return of Southern Dobruja. The Romanian requests received no response.

==== Entry into the World War ====
Antonescu maintained his objective of recovering the territories ceded to the Soviet Union in June 1940, waiting for the moment when the confrontation between the Reich and the USSR would break out. He thought that only by aligning itself with Nazi Germany could Romania recover the lost provinces. Border incidents between the two countries had continued after the cession of the territories to the USSR in the summer of 1940; the Soviets maintained pressure on the Romanian Government and occupied certain islands in the Danube, to try to secure control of the river delta. Bilateral relations remained tense.

In the spring of 1941, the commander of the German military mission in Romania confidentially confirmed to Antonescu that a plan existed to attack the USSR. At the meeting of 12 June between Antonescu and Hitler in Munich, the former expressed his decision to "continue firmly on the road that would lead to the victory of the Axis in the present conflict and to the recognition of Romania's rights". Hitler explained the deterioration of his country's relations with the Soviets and the probable outbreak of a conflict at any moment, without explicitly requesting Romanian support, though expecting it. Antonescu replied that, in the national interest, "Romania had to participate in the combat from the first day".

On 18 June, Hitler wrote to Antonescu setting out his reasons for attacking the Soviet Union shortly and informed him of the deployment of troops in Romanian territory for the attack. On 21 June, the German ambassador went to the Soviet Ministry of Foreign Affairs to deliver the message that amounted to a declaration of war, and the invasion began the next day. The Romanian front contained three mixed German-Romanian army corps, of which Antonescu theoretically commanded one, made up of two Romanian armies and one German one. The former provinces ceded to the Soviets had been recovered by about 25 July, but a great number of civilian deaths had taken place, especially of Jews, including massacres such as that of Iași. Despite his previous statements, Antonescu decided to continue fighting alongside the Germans beyond the Dniester once the lost territories had been recovered.

== Economy and society of Interwar Romania ==
Religions
(%, 1930)
1. Orthodox (72.6) (72.6%)
2. Greek Catholics (7.9) (7.90%)
3. Catholics (6.8) (6.80%)
4. Calvinists (3.9) (3.90%)
5. Lutherans (2.2) (2.20%)
6. Unitarians (0.4) (0.40%)
7. Hebrews (4.2) (4.20%)
8. Muslims (1) (1.00%)
9. Others (0.6) (0.60%)
10. Baptists (0.4) (0.40%)
Cultures
(%, 1930)
1. Romanians (71.9) (71.9%)
2. Magyars (7.9) (7.90%)
3. Germans (4.1) (4.10%)
4. Russians (2.3) (2.30%)
5. Czechoslovaks (0.3) (0.30%)
6. Jews (4) (4.00%)
7. Turks and Tatars (1) (1.00%)
8. Roma (1.5) (1.50%)
9. Gagauz (0.6) (0.60%)
10. Others (0.9) (0.90%)
11. Ukrainians (3.2) (3.20%)
12. Yugoslavs (0.3) (0.30%)
13. Bulgarians (2) (2.00%)
Population by economic sectors
(%, 1930)
1. Agriculture (72.3) (72.3%)
2. Industry (8.6) (8.60%)
3. Liberal professions (6.4) (6.40%)
4. Public services (4.8) (4.80%)
5. Trade and banking (4.2) (4.20%)
6. Transport and communications (2.8) (2.80%)
7. Mining (0.9) (0.90%)

=== Religion ===
The new country had a great variety of religions among its citizens, which generally corresponded to their community. Thus, Romanians were mostly Orthodox or, to a lesser extent and especially in Transylvania, Greek Catholic; the Russians, Ukrainians, Bulgarians, and Serbs were also Orthodox, while the Hungarians were Catholics, Calvinists, or Unitarians. The Turks and Tatars were Muslims, while the Czechs, Slovaks, Croats, and Slovenes were Catholics. The Germans could be Catholic (Swabians) or Lutheran (Saxons). Some Jews declared their nationality as Romanian or Hungarian, and were counted among those communities for nationality purposes. The Gagauz, of Turkish culture, were Orthodox Christians.

=== Minorities and discrimination ===
At this stage, the country had a 70% Romanian population, with numerous but diverse minorities and a growth rate favorable to the Romanians. The minorities were regarded as foreign, despite the long-standing settlement of many of them.

In Transylvania, a region like almost all the new territories of the kingdom with numerous minorities, a policy of reversing the earlier process of Magyarization was carried out, with notable success among the German minority, though not among the Jews, who largely maintained their Magyar culture. The administration was considered discriminatory toward members of the minorities, but its inefficiency also prevented the strict application of the measures against them.

Politically, the minority most feared by the ruling circles of Bucharest was the Hungarian one, traditionally the ruling class in Transylvania, while the Jewish community was the object of rejection because of its economic capacity. The Hebrews had arrived in large numbers during the 19th century from Galicia and had settled as tenants of the large landowners absentee landlords, and as moneylenders and small artisans. After independence, the small Romanian middle class concentrated on monopolizing political and administrative posts and the liberal professions, leaving much of the economy in the hands of the Jewish minority. In the interwar period this minority controlled most of the capital in numerous economic sectors (exports, transport, textile industry, chemicals, printing...) and, despite legal and illegal restrictions limiting their access to higher education, they were numerous in the liberal professions. Romanians only dominated ownership of commercial firms in Wallachia; in the rest of the territories the majority were in the hands of the Jewish minority (56% of those in Moldavia, 63% of those in Bessarabia, and 77% of those in Bukovina). (Note: In Transylvania the situation was more balanced: 37% of the businesses were owned by Hungarians and Germans, a similar percentage by Romanians, and about 25% by Jews.) The Hebrews tended to concentrate in the cities, with a proportion of urban residents much higher than their share of the country's total population (4% of the total population, but 14% of the urban population). In cities such as Cernăuţi (Note: There they made up 38%, compared with 27% Romanians.) or Chișinău they were an overwhelming majority. Scarcely integrated and economically powerful as a community, they were victims of the xenophobia relatively widespread in the country.

The rest of the minorities did not suffer such acute discrimination, but they endured poor Romanian administration, especially in Bessarabia, the most backward province and, at the same time, the worst governed.

=== Economic activities and population ===
The population was predominantly rural, with more than 70% of the population devoted to agriculture and close to 80% in settlements of fewer than 10,000 inhabitants. Agricultural productivity was low (48% of the European average) and the illiteracy rate high (42.9% among those over 7 years old). Despite having the highest infant mortality on the continent, it also had the highest birth rate and the population increased at a rate of 1.4% per year. The population was young: 46.4% of it was under twenty years of age.

=== Postwar economic situation ===
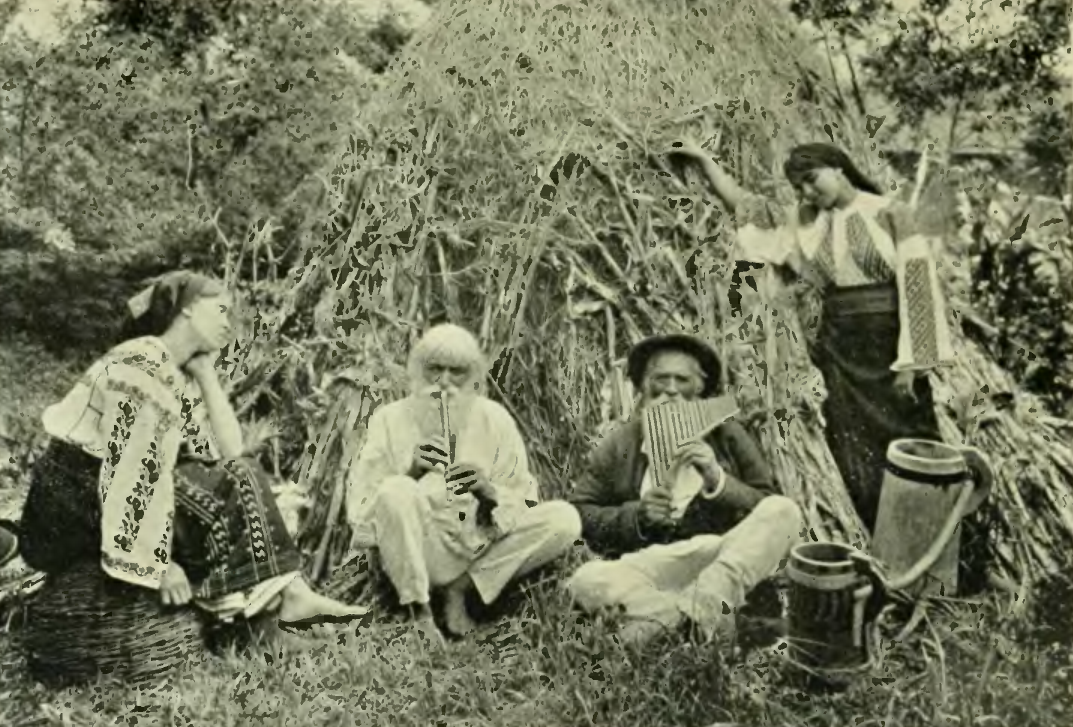
Romanian peasants at the beginning of the 20th century. Most of the Romanian interwar population worked the land under harsh conditions, despite the postwar agrarian reform.

Until its entry into the First World War on the side of the Triple Entente, Romania had been secretly allied to the Germany and Austria-Hungary through the Triple Alliance, which it joined to have the support of these powers against possible Russian incursions in the Balkans. The two empires had until then been its main trading partners and its most important investors.

When the war ended and the Central Powers were defeated, they had to cede their places in the Romanian economy to the victors; these acquired the German investments in Romania, including those in the important petroleum industry. France, besides being the principal ally, became the country's main lender and one of the main investors, together with the United Kingdom and the United States.

During the 1920s, relations with Germany, previously so significant, declined to a historic minimum, being confined to Romania's demand on Germany for the debts stipulated in the peace treaties.

=== Social situation ===
The country was overwhelmingly agricultural, with 80% of the population engaged in work in the countryside. The situation of the Romanian peasant was, in general, miserable. At the end of the 19th century, competition from American and Russian grain sank the price of Romanian production. The landowners decided to try to compete by resorting to the oppression of the laborers, promulgating a law in 1893 that hindered their emigration to other localities or to America. In addition, they ceded the exploitation of their estates to tenants who had to exploit the estates to the maximum, taking advantage of the abundant and cheap labor, which did not encourage investment in modernization, and this gave rise to growing unrest among the impoverished victims of the system. The bucolic facade of the Romanian countryside concealed a situation of misery, with wide areas affected by endemic diseases, extensive alcoholism due to poor diet, and a lack of health and transport infrastructure.

The tension had already given rise to revolts in 1888 and, above all, to the great peasant revolt of 1907, which marked a milestone in the country, making palpable the great discontent of the majority of the population with their conditions of extreme hardship. The middle and upper classes of the country would remember the moments of the rebellion with horror, despite its having been crushed with blood and fire by the Army, which used heavy artillery against the rebels and caused nearly eleven thousand deaths.

As a result of the bloody revolt, the nation became aware of the seriousness of the problem and debates began in the circles of power on how to resolve it. In 1913, after the PNL returned to power, a draft agrarian reform law was drawn up, but it was not approved because of the outbreak of the First World War the following year.

=== Agrarian reform and attempts at development ===
In the middle of the World War and after the February Revolution in Russia accelerated the disintegration of the Russian Army, which at that time was defending most of the Romanian front, fear of popular revolts and the desire to strengthen the morale of peasant troops led the king to promise an agrarian reform in April 1917.

The reform took more than four years to arrive and three successive decrees were needed to make its application concrete. Despite the delay, the reform was profound: the most extensive apart from that carried out by the Russian revolutionary Government. In Transylvania, the traditional landowning class, Magyar, faced a Romanian majority that made up the small peasantry and the group of day laborers, and was dispossessed without excessive regard. Bessarabia had also promulgated its agrarian reform, like Transylvania, in the brief period between the loss of control by the previous central Government and its annexation to Romania. The Bessarabian reform was approved rapidly to legitimize peasant occupations, but also to limit them, while the Transylvanian one was a model of Central European legislation.

Ion Mihalache, leader of the Peasant Party and minister of Agriculture between December 1919 and March 1920, drafted the reform law for the territories of the old kingdom. His Government fell before he could implement it, partly because of the nature of the reform plan. The law that was finally applied, in 1921, nevertheless included the main features of his bill.

By 1927, properties of more than 100 hectares had come to occupy 10.43% of the territory, whereas before the reform they amounted to 40.23%. It was the most extensive agrarian reform in all of Europe, after the Soviet one. Economically, however, it was a failure: since its objective had been political (to prevent revolutionary tendencies among the peasants), the process was not followed up with measures that could favor improvement in the peasants' conditions. Low productivity remained, as did the great subdivision of holdings in the face of rapid population growth and general underemployment. Even in 1941, the percentage of farms below the threshold considered the minimum viable one was 58.4%.

Immediately after the war, which in Romania lasted until the summer of 1919 because of the conflict with the Hungarian Soviet Republic, the priority of political leaders was not the improvement of agriculture but the economic unification of the country. The process was never completed during the interwar period, despite the numerous measures aimed at it. In 1920, under the government of Averescu, administrative centralization was implemented. The same year the currency was unified, and the leu was adopted throughout the national territory. At the beginning of 1923, with the Liberals back in power, taxation was unified. Later, the banks of the old kingdom expanded into the new provinces and certain industries in those provinces were nationalized, a process criticized by the minorities as discriminatory; the opposition accused the Liberals of trying to control the economy of the new territories for their own benefit.

Almost the entire postwar period until 1928 was controlled by Liberal or allied Governments. These maintained an economic policy in which the State was the country's main economic agent; they established important monopolies and subsidies, with high tariffs protective, high taxes on agricultural exports, and opposed the investment of foreign capital in the country out of mistrust of possible foreign imperialism. The use of the State as the engine of development was due mainly to the absence of an abundant bourgeoisie in the country, a situation that already existed since the nation's independence. The creation of industry by the State, however, led to great corruption, since both were concentrated in the hands of a small oligarchy. The need to rely on the State to promote business and the meager remuneration of the growing number of civil servants also fostered abuses.

The attempt at autarkic industrialization relegated agriculture to second place; it also had to serve to obtain the funds needed to finance the former, given the reluctance to accept foreign investment. Liberal policies worsened the situation in the countryside still further: the lack of adequate credit, the imposition of tariffs on imports of industrial goods for the countryside, and the enormous taxes on exports of agricultural products harmed the peasants.

=== The Great Depression ===
The agrarian reform showed its ineffectiveness and its clear political character (to avoid a possible revolution) rather than an economic one with the arrival of the Great Depression in the country. The expectations of economic improvement and social progress that it had fostered had disappeared by the beginning of the 1930s. After assigning plots of land to the peasants after the World War, successive Governments had neglected their fate. During the long period of Liberal Governments in the decade following the war, their policy had favored the low price of agricultural products, to ensure supplies for the cities and the industrialization of the country, while also heavily taxing the export of these articles as a source of revenue for the State. The Romanian farmer yielded 40% of the value of his production to the State through various taxes, receiving hardly any services in return, such as a good transport network that would facilitate the sale of his products. Small producers, in a bad situation, soon became deeply indebted to meet obligations, unable to invest in improving their holdings and subject to usurious interest, given the lack of an efficient credit policy.

The collapse of credit in the summer of 1931 and the huge fall in agricultural exports definitively deprived the peasants of credit and drastically reduced the prices of their produce. After the end of the unfavorable policy toward exports with the end of the Liberal Governments in 1928, the arrival of the world crisis reduced them still more, despite the support of the new National Peasant Governments.

Between 1932 and 1934, three different Governments had to promulgate three corresponding reforms to reduce the enormous and growing debts of the peasants and ease the pressure of payments. The measures did not serve, however, to recover a sufficient level of credit, and even by 1939 an efficient credit system had still not been established. The fact that many of the private lenders who replaced the nonexistent official credit were Jews caused antisemitism to increase among the distressed peasants.

=== Industrialization and rearmament ===
With the establishment of the royal dictatorship and the worsening of the international situation in 1938, impetus was given to the industrialization of the country, above all with the objective of rearming it against possible threats. The process involved great corruption, centered in the circles of power close to King Carol. The important Malaxa industries, owned by the industrialist Nicolae Malaxa, close to the monarch, obtained profits of between 300 and 1000%, with 98% of their production -mostly armaments- destined for the State.

The industrialization process failed, however, in all respects: it neither managed to absorb the surplus rural population, nor created a national market, nor supported agriculture, nor made Romania an industrial state, nor managed to supply the country with arms to prevent subsequent territorial losses.

=== Trade relations with foreign countries ===
At the beginning of the 1920s, with the successive governments of the PNL and its allies, economic nationalism was maintained that viewed foreign investment unfavorably. The attitude changed when the National Peasant Party came to power at the end of the decade and the country sank into the Great Depression.

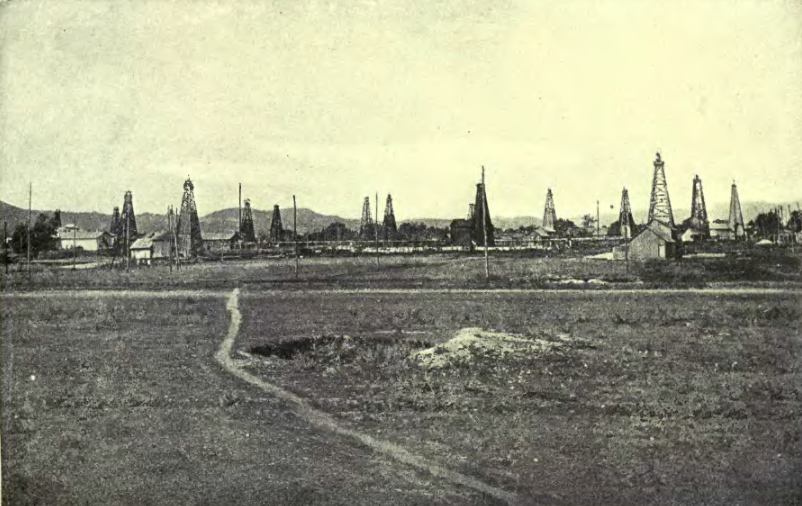
Romanian oil fields, increasingly coveted in the arms race of the second half of the 1930s. Romania was the principal supplier of oil to Nazi Germany, together with the USSR.

In 1930 a trade agreement was signed with Germany and the following year a preferential one, but the policy of autarky of the German governments that lasted until 1934 hindered German-Romanian trade. That year the German Economy Minister Hjalmar Schacht designed the new plan that set aside multilateral trade to base German trade, lacking foreign currency to acquire goods on the international market, on bilateral relations. He then promoted a barter system through clearing accounts with less industrialized countries that could supply raw materials of interest to the Reich, among them Romania. Trade with Germany had supporters among Romanian ruling circles because it guaranteed a market at prices above international ones for many of the country's exports at a time of global crisis and allowed Romania to acquire industrial goods that it could not afford to pay for in foreign currency on the free market. Thus, the negotiations of 1934 led to the signing of a new trade agreement in March 1935. Under it, Germany undertook to import thirty million marks of Romanian agricultural products and another seven million of various raw materials, which increased Romanian economic dependence on the Reich.

In 1936 attempts to reach an economic agreement with France failed because of its inability to absorb Romanian agricultural exports and to supply arms to the Romanian government, which the previous year had begun a rearmament program. Romania's neighboring countries, also mostly agricultural, could not serve as a market for Romanian products. In 1936 only 21% of Romanian trade was with its neighbors. Romania increasingly requested armaments from Germany in exchange for its exports, given the impossibility of obtaining them from its allies.

Trade with Germany then again gained importance, as before the World War it had been the main trading partner and, even in the 1920s, had maintained greater trade than that of Great Britain and France together in Romania. In 1937 Germany absorbed 19% of Romanian exports and supplied 29% of its imports. The intention of the German government was twofold: to destroy the alliance of the Little Entente that France supported, thereby weakening France, and at the same time to acquire supplies for the coming war. In fact German trade with Romania had grown in importance after the beginning of the Four Year Plan that was to prepare the country for war. In December 1937, a new trade agreement was signed that increased by a third the previous level of transactions between the two countries.

The trade agreement of 23 March 1939 was concluded with the Romanian objective of granting Germany again the preponderant role it had enjoyed until the First World War. In it, based on Romanian proposals that the German negotiators then used as a basis, the creation of joint companies for the forest exploitation and mineral exploitation of Romania and German assistance in developing the Romanian armaments and aviation industries were envisaged. Germany also undertook to deliver the armaments that the Romanians had ordered from Czechoslovakia, recently dismembered. The agreement did not, however, imply total German control of the Romanian economy, since other trade treaties were signed shortly afterward between Romania and France and the United Kingdom, although it increased Germany's economic influence.

In 1940 around a third of German oil needs were to be covered by Romania. On 6 March 1940, Germany and Romania agreed on a new trade treaty, by which the former would deliver part of the arms captured in the recent Polish campaign to the latter in exchange for a greater supply of oil. The agreement made Anglo-French attempts to hinder the Reich's supply by increasing the price of crude oil -which Germany had difficulty paying for in foreign currency- fail, by setting the price of the oil to be delivered to the Reich at the prewar level. The pact was finally signed on the day Belgium surrendered (27 May 1940), as King Carol II saw German victory ever nearer and wished to ingratiate himself with the government in Berlin.

Already during the Antonescu regime, during the signing of the Tripartite Pact a new economic agreement was reached with Germany, which was signed less than two weeks later in Berlin, at the beginning of December 1940. The agreement adapted the Romanian economy to German military needs, but in return the country received long-term, low-interest credits, agricultural machinery, fertilizers, and German industrial and agricultural advice. The Iron Guard crushed and Antonescu at the head of a new military government, an increase in oil supplies to Germany was agreed at the beginning of March 1941, in case Soviet supply disappeared (the attack on the Soviet Union had been approved on 18 December 1940). Antonescu was favorable in exchange for an increase in the price paid for it by the Reich.

== Administrative divisions ==
In Greater Romania there were three distinct periods from the point of view of administrative division.

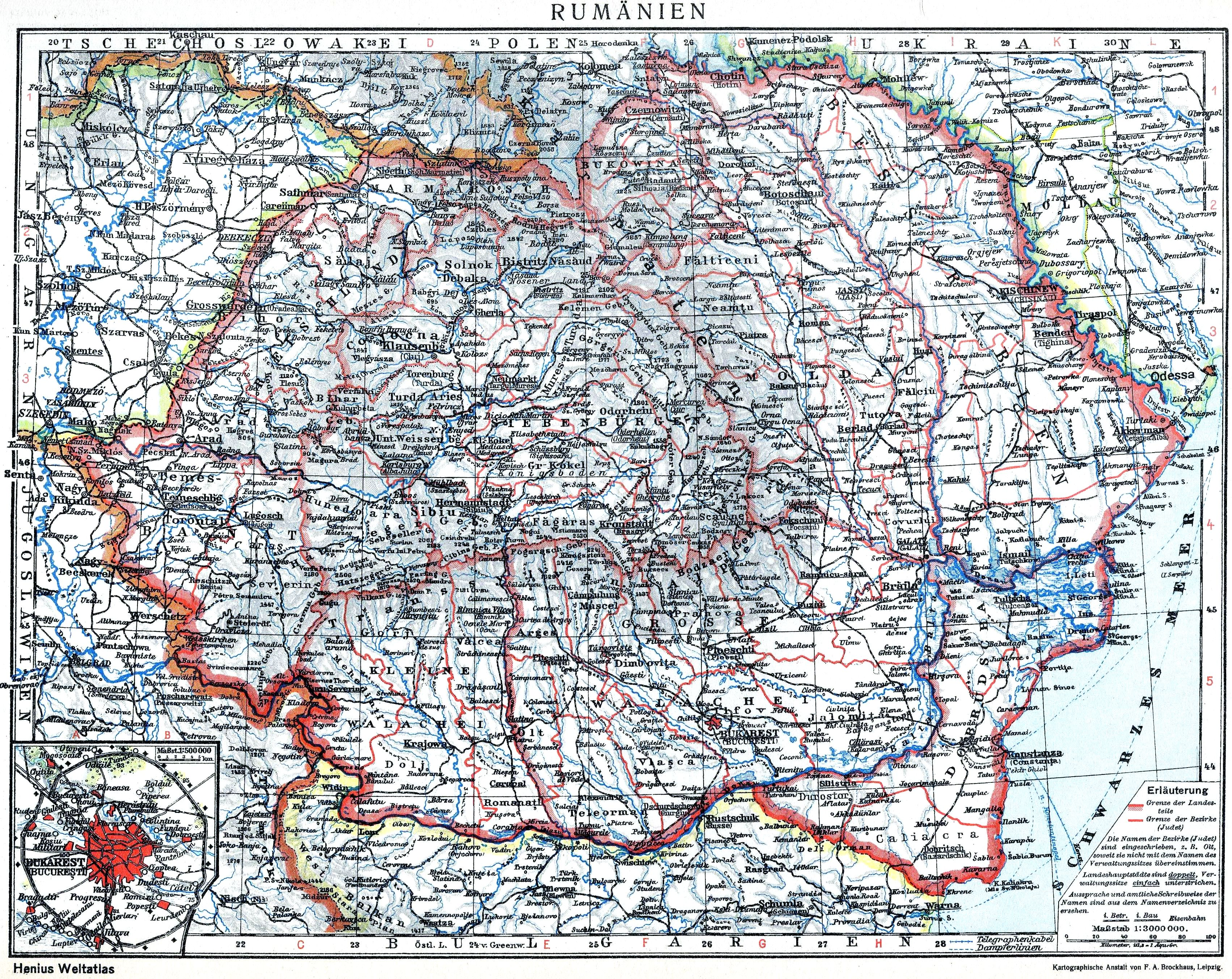
Counties of the Kingdom of Romania in 1925

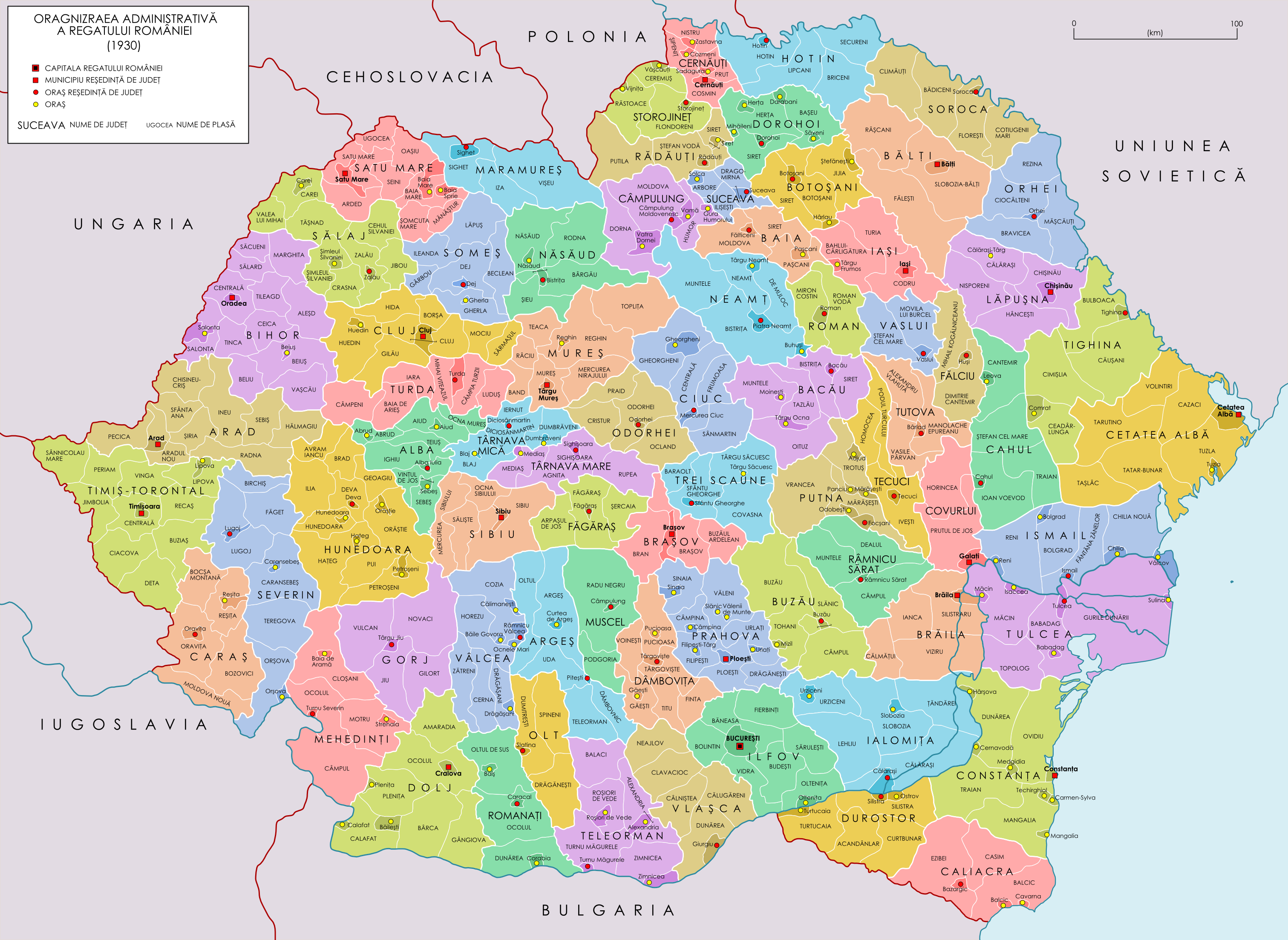
The counties in 1930

=== Period 1938–1940 ===
Romanian Ținuturi in 1939

With the new constitution of 1938, a new level of administrative division was introduced, the Ținut, which comprised several counties.

== See also ==
- List of Romanians who were born outside present-day Romania
- Moldovenism
- Greater Moldova
- Romanianization
- Little Entente
- Greater Serbia
- Hungarian irredentism
- Greater Bulgaria
- Greater Ukraine
- Unification of Moldova and Romania

== Sources ==
- Constantinesco, Nicholas (2004). Romania in Harm's Way. Columbia University Press. ISBN 9780880335461.
- Haynes, Rebecca (2000). Romanian policy towards Germany, 1936-40. Palgrave Macmillan. ISBN 9780312232603.
- Roberts, Henry L. (1951). Rumania: Political Problems of an Agrarian State. Yale University Press.
- Rothschild, Joseph (1990). East Central Europe Between the Two World Wars. University of Washington Press. ISBN 9780295953571.
- Sandu, Traian (2008). Histoire de la Roumanie (in French). Perrin. ISBN 9782262024321.
- Veiga, Francisco (1989). La mística del ultranacionalismo. Historia de la Guardia de hierro, Rumania, 1919-1941 (in Spanish). Publicacions de la Universitat autònoma de Barcelona (Bellaterra). ISBN 9788474884975.
