= Great Union =

1918 unification of the Kingdom of Romania with most ethnically Romanian territories

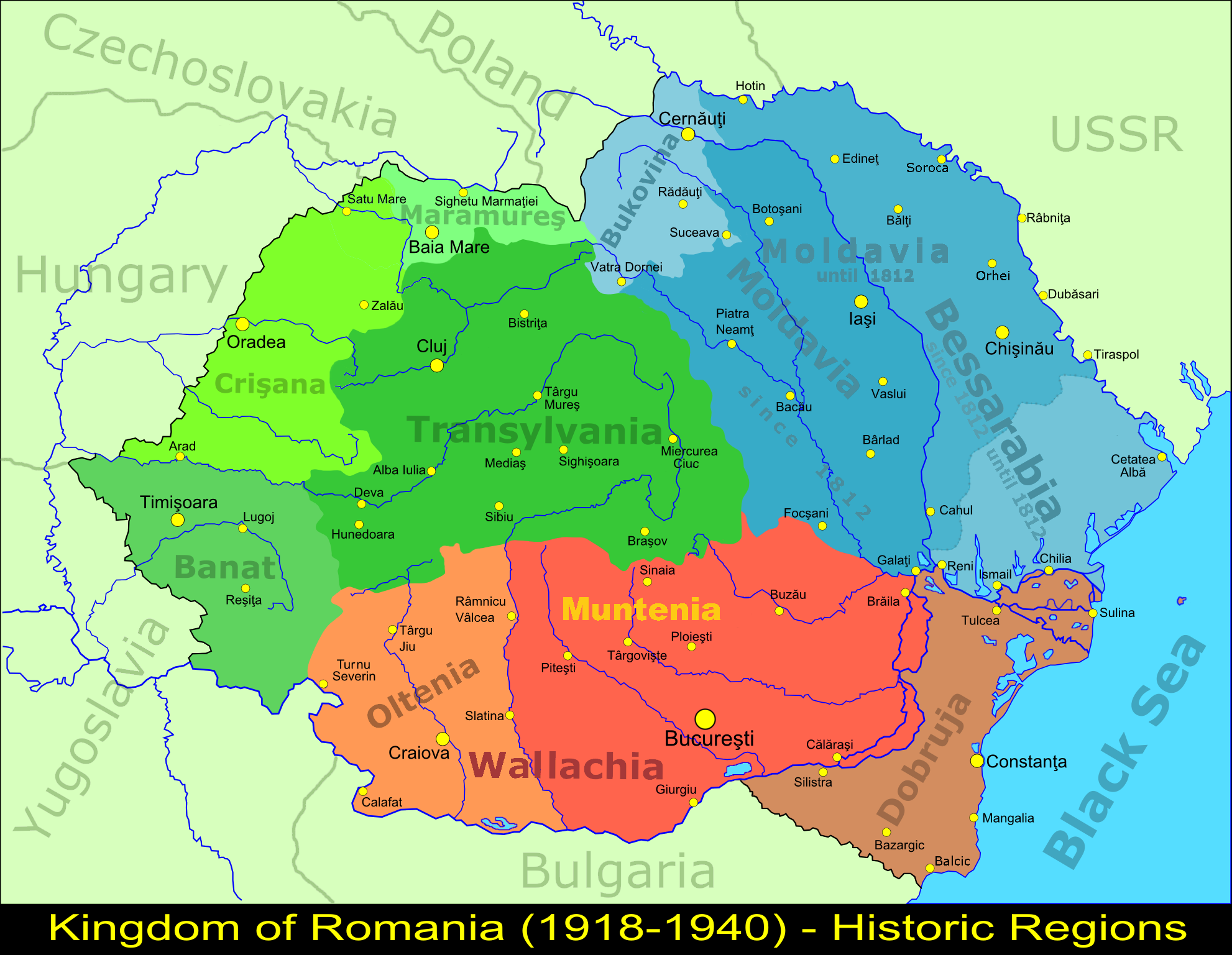
- Map of the Kingdom of Romania between 1920 and 1940 and its historical regions
- Native name: Marea Unire
- Date: 1 December 1918
- Location: Romania
- Participants: Kingdom of Romania; Moldavian Democratic Republic; Duchy of Bukovina; Romanian National Council
- Outcome: Proclamation of Greater Romania

In Romanian historiography, the Great Union (Romanian: Marea Unire) or Great Union of 1918 (Marea Unire din 1918) was the series of political unifications the Kingdom of Romania had with several of the Romanian historical regions, starting with Bessarabia on 27 March 1918, continuing with Bukovina on 28 November 1918 and finalizing with Transylvania (on its broad meaning) on 1 December 1918 with the declaration of the union of this region with Romania during an assembly at the city of Alba Iulia. Romanians also consider several other events as preludes to the Great Union, such as the unification of Moldavia and Wallachia (also known as the Little Union, Mica Unire) in 1859 or the independence of the country and the annexation of Northern Dobruja in 1878, and also the occupation of Transylvania and Moldavia by the Prince of Wallachia, Michael the Brave, in 1600.

Today, the Great Union has an important meaning in Romania, and it is commemorated in the Great Union Day, the national day of the country, every 1 December. The centenary of the Great Union on 1 December 2018 was widely celebrated in Romania, with military parades at cities like Alba Iulia and Bucharest to which many people (up to 550,000, 100,000 of them in Alba Iulia alone), including the President of Romania Klaus Iohannis, attended. The centenary was also celebrated in Moldova, where more than 100 localities and 3 districts declared unification with Romania.

== See also ==
- Dacianism
- Greater Romania
- Romanian nationalism
