= Romanian National Guards =

Romanian military organization in 1918 Transylvania

Romanian National Guards were paramilitary groups affiliated to Romanian National Council in Transylvania, Banat, and Partium during November and December 1918. Composed of demobilized Romanian soldiers and officers from the Austro-Hungarian Army, they provided law enforcing in the areas with significant Romanian population, and ensured the security of political meetings.

Although no official data was released, conservative estimates put the number of Romanian National Guard groups active during this time to 3,700 or higher.

== Formation and role ==
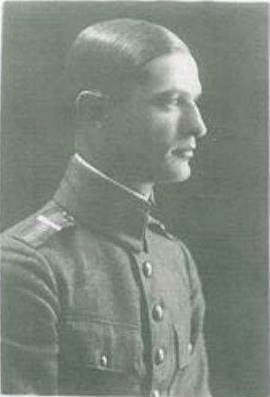
Florian Medrea, captain of the Romanian National Guard in Alba Iulia

The final years of World War I in Austria-Hungary saw an increase in desertion and social upheaval, accompanied by looting, arsons, and clashes with the authorities. Armed groups opposed to the authorities, known as the Green Cadres, operated in the Kingdom of Hungary, and the situation escalated towards the end of the war when more soldiers returned from the front and following Aster Revolution. The new political authorities' response was to create National Guards (Nemzetőrség). In Transylvania, separate Romanian and Saxon guards were created - initially in conjunction with the Hungarian counterparts, then as military wings of the respective political Council - to help maintain social order.

The cooperation between the Romanian National Council and the Romanian soldiers was set on 30 October 1918 by Iuliu Maniu who met with the Romanian officers in Vienna and established a military senate that oversaw the activity and the return of the Romanian soldiers in the Austro-Hungarian army to their home regions. On 27 November 1918 the Senate held its last meeting, and the remaining staff left the Imperial capital. Meanwhile, in the areas of the Kingdom of Hungary in which the council claimed control, the National Guards replaced the Hungarian gendarmes, and even Romanian ones, effectively supplanting them. The guards wore the Austro-Hungarian uniforms or civilian clothes, with an arm band in the Romanian national colors with the words "Garda Națională Română".

The Romanian National Guard in Alba Iulia under the command of captain Florian Medrea ensured the security of the Great National Assembly.

The Guards were gradually abolished by the Ruling Council starting from 22 December 1918, and replaced with gendarmerie forces.
