= Great National Assembly of Alba Iulia =

1918 assembly of ethnic Romanians in Alba Iulia

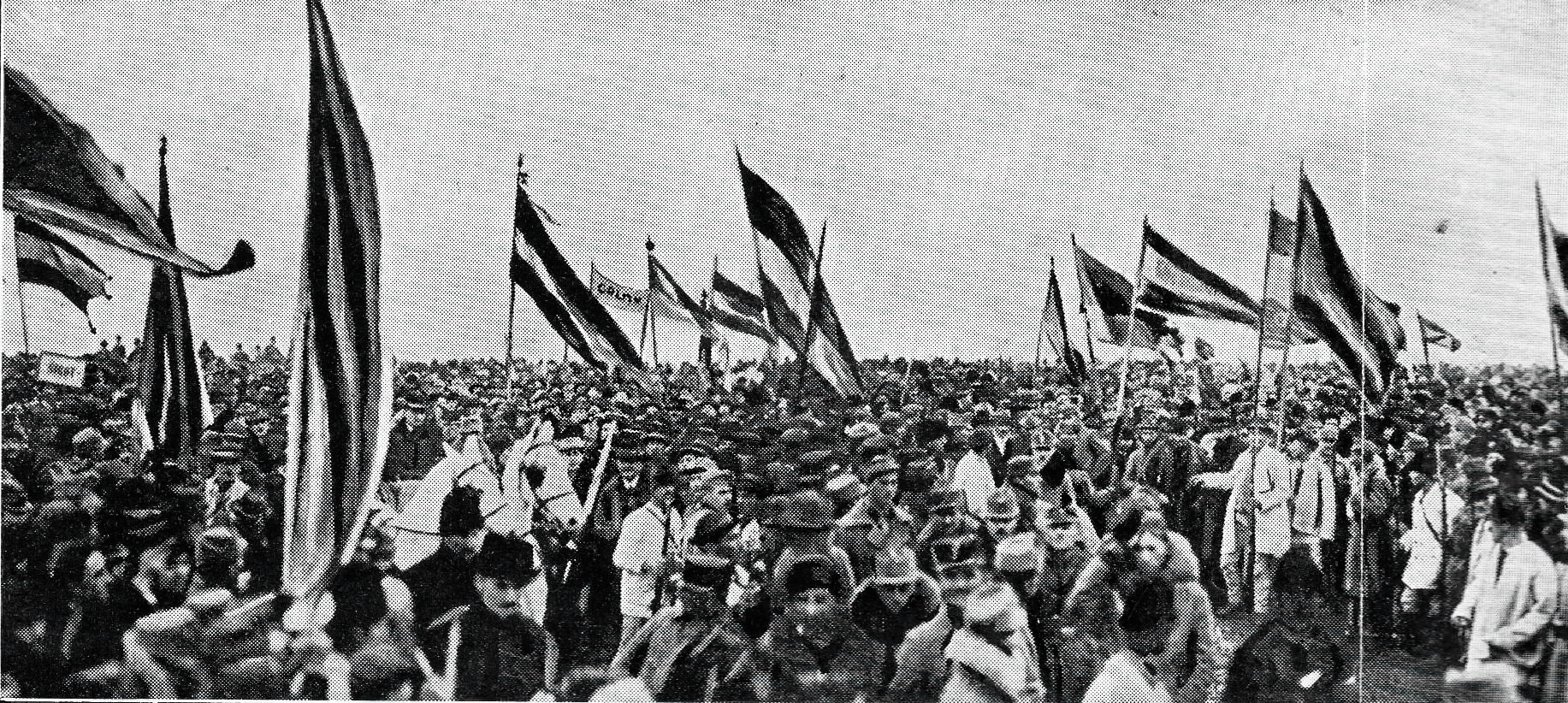
Picture of the Great National Assembly of Alba Iulia, taken by Samoilă Mârza

The Great National Assembly of Alba Iulia (Romanian: Marea Adunare Națională de la Alba Iulia) was an assembly held on 1 December 1918 in the city of Alba Iulia in which a total of 1,228 delegates from several areas inhabited by ethnic Romanians declared the union of Transylvania with Romania. It was summoned by the Romanian National Council. Regular ethnic Romanian civilians were also called to participate, and these came from all regions inhabited by Romanians; in total, the assembly was attended by some 100,000 people. The union of Transylvania with Romania was declared with the adoption of the Declaration of Alba Iulia during the assembly.

Although the assembly was announced for 1 December, debates on Transylvania's accession into Romania between prominent representatives of the Romanian National Central Council started already on 30 November. At the debate, chaired by Ștefan Cicio Pop, the present social democrats, including Ioan Flueraș, argued in favour of autonomy for Transylvania within Greater Romania, while the majority of nationalists and representatives of expatriates argued against autonomy and in favour of unconditional annexation.

Even though Blaj and Sibiu were considered as places where the assembly could take place, the city of Alba Iulia ended up being chosen for this. This was because its Romanian militia was the strongest of Transylvania at the time and also because of the symbolic value of the city for having been a capital of the former Principality of Transylvania and because of the actions in the city of Michael the Brave, who united the principalities of Moldavia, Transylvania and Wallachia in 1600.

The day after the Great National Assembly and the Declaration of Alba Iulia, the Ruling Council of Transylvania, Banat and the Romanian Lands in Hungary was created for the administration of the lands that had been declared as having united with Romania.

Today, the day of the Great National Assembly is commemorated as the Great Union Day, the national day of Romania.

== See also ==
- 1918 Great National Assembly election
- Great Union
