= Romanian National Council =

1918 political organisation in Transylvania

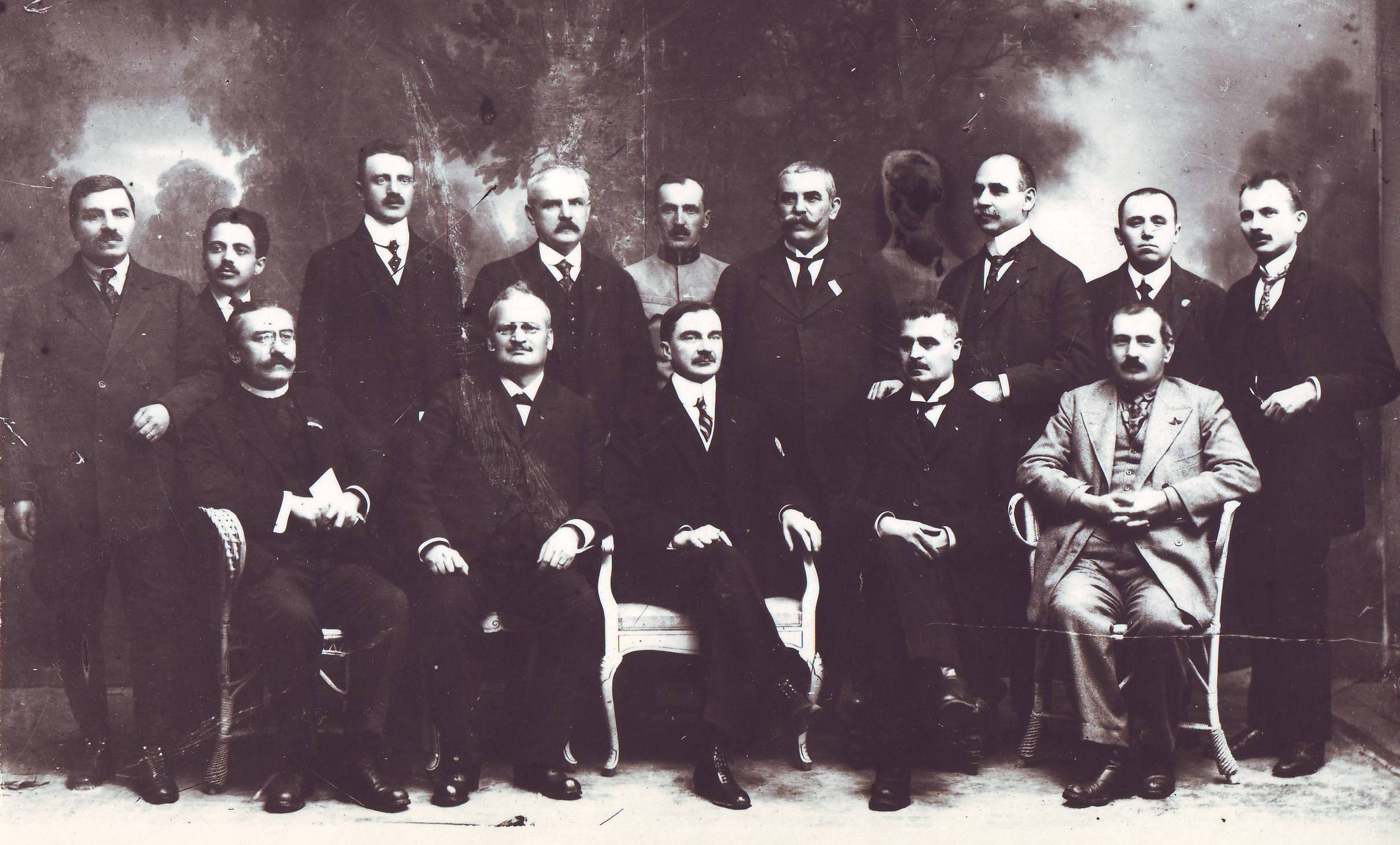
Members of the Transylvanian Ruling Council (December 1918). Bottom row, from left to right: Al. Vaida-Voevod, Ștefan Cicio Pop, Iuliu Maniu, Vasile Goldiş, Aurel Vlad. Top row: Joseph Jumanca, Romul Boilă, Valeriu Braniște, Victor Bontescu, Ioan Suciu, Aurel Lazăr, Emil Haţieganu, Ioan Flueraş. Octavian Goga and Vasile Lucaciu are missing as they were in a mission abroad.

The Romanian National Council was an association of Romanian political leaders from Transylvania created on the eve of the expected dissolution of the monarchy of the Austro-Hungarian Empire. The council was formed at the end of October 1918 in Budapest, following the model of the already established National Councils in the empire such as the Hungarian National Council or the Slovak National Council. Its members were representatives of the Romanian National Party in Hungary and Transylvania, the main Romanian party in the Diet of Hungary, and representatives of the Romanian Social Democrats, the Romanian section of the larger Social Democratic Party of Hungary. Two of them, Octavian Goga and Vasile Lucaciu, were also founding members of the National Council of Romanian Unity established in Paris on 3 October along with Take Ionescu and Constantin Angelescu from the Kingdom of Romania. The council organized the Romanian National Guards, the Great National Assembly of Alba Iulia that decided for the Union of Transylvania with Romania on 1 December 1918, and provided the members for the Ruling Council of Transylvania, the de facto governing body of the region from 2 December 1918 until April 1920.

== Background ==
As World War I was coming to a conclusion and the defeat Austria-Hungary was imminent, at Budapest the Hungarian National Council was formed on 23 October 1918 from the Independence Party, led by Mihály Károlyi, the Hungarian Radical Party, led by Oszkár Jászi, and the Social Democratic Party of Hungary, having in its program the immediate end to the war, the independence of Hungary, the introduction of universal suffrage, and the recognition of the right of the nationalities to self-determination. Despite the reconciliatory goals, the council already faced separatist tendencies from other national groups such as Romanians and Germans in Transylvania. The former, through the voice of Alexandru Vaida-Voevod – the leader of the nationalist Romanian party, read just five days earlier in the Diet a declaration asserting the right of Romanians in the kingdom to decide their fate:

The executive committee of the Romanian National Party, as the representative body of the Romanian nation from Hungary and Transylvania, considering the situation created by the World War, concludes that the results of this war completely justify the centuries old aspirations of the Romanian people to gain complete national freedom. On the basis of the natural right that each nation is free to determine its fate, a right recognized by the Diet of Hungary through its request for armistice, we declare that the Romanian nation from Hungary and Transylvania wishes to use this right and consequently demands that it solely, independently, and unbound by foreign influences decide on its membership to a state and its relations to other nations. The Romanian National Committee does not recognize the competency of this government and this parliament to represent the interests of the Romanian people and does not recognize the right of any foreign agent to meddle in this matter, stipulating that at the peace conference only those authorized by the Romanian National Committee are entitled to represent the interests of the Romanian people.

After this declaration the Romanians refused to recognize the primacy of the Hungarian authorities in all following discussions involving the governing of disputed territories.

== The political struggle over Transylvania ==
At the same time as the situation in Budapest was rapidly devolving and the country was heading towards the Chrysanthemum Revolution, Vienna was experiencing revolutionary movements and mass protests. Lucian Blaga, student at Viena University at the time recorded in his autobiography:

Bulgaria collapsed. Within the Austro-Hungarian Empire and Germany, the signs of disaggregation were numerically rising with the lapse of time. Tainted by blood, the imperial symbols vanished. The students, who had been fighting on the battlefields for years, were returning to their floor. On the gangs of the University there appeared many combative faces grooved by the war experience. Under the colonnades there were clamors. Alma Mater was blackened by the smoke of the decline. In the library where I collected my material for the doctoral thesis, just you could only see, in opposition to any rule of good discipline, a youth arising to held an incendiary discourse. The rumor of the street was crossing the walls. The manifestations intensified. Broadsheets, announcing the revolution, combined with the autumn leaves. The manifestoes, like the leaves, were also a deep read. The masses from the periphery appeared to be pumped by an absorption point from the centre […] From the distances of the Ring, the deaf rumor of the moving mass was fathoming to us. No one could control the tumult any more. No one could face the liberated powers. Chaotic times were announced for the future.

As the news from the capital reached the front, approximately 250,000 Austro-Hungarian soldiers, belonging to different nationalities, deserted. The Romanian National Party delegated Iuliu Maniu with the task of contacting the Romanian soldiers in Vienna who were estimated to be almost 70,000, either stationed or returning from the front. Maniu organized a meeting with the Romanian officers on 30 October, and on 31 October convened the formation of the Romanian Military Senate with the aim of organizing the military personnel for "the service of the holy cause of the Romanian nation". The Senate was presided by Ioan Boeriu, Baron of Polichna. Although faced with further desertion, it established control over the main Romanian barracks in the city with the approval of the Austrian government, swearing fealty to the Romanian National Council in a ceremony held on 13 November. During their activity the Senate also had to organize the troops to defend the government against Viennese revolutionaries. On the 27th of November the last meeting in Vienna took place, after which the soldiers and the officers departed for Transylvania.

Meanwhile, in Budapest, the government led by Sándor Wekerle resigned and the King, Charles IV, appointed János Hadik as the head of the new government on 30 October. Protests erupted on 29 and 30 October in favor of the Hungarian National Council leader, Mihály Károlyi, and Hadik was forced to resign only 17 hours after his official appointment. Károlyi became prime-minister on 31 October by popular demand and the protests developed in a full revolutionary movement, known as Aster Revolution or Chrysanthemum Revolution due to the chrysanthemum symbols soldiers used to replace the Astro-Hungarian K.u.K letters on their hats. The Romanian political leaders, gathered at Vadászkürt Hotel in Budapest on 31 October, formed the Romanian National Council. Led by Ştefan Cicio-Pop, its members were Teodor Mihali, Vasile Goldiș, Alexandru Vaida-Voevod, Aurel Vlad, and Aurel Lazăr from the National party and Ion Flueraș, Iosif Jumanca, Enea Grapini, Basiliu Surdu, Tiron Albani, and Iosif Renoi from the Social Democrats. The Romanian Council, unlike the Hungarian Council still kept an anti-revolutionary and pro-dynastic position. Among its first acts was however to congratulate the newly appointed Hungarian prime-minister, and Károlyi, taking note of the newly established organization, delegated Oszkár Jászi to hold talks with the Romanian delegates.

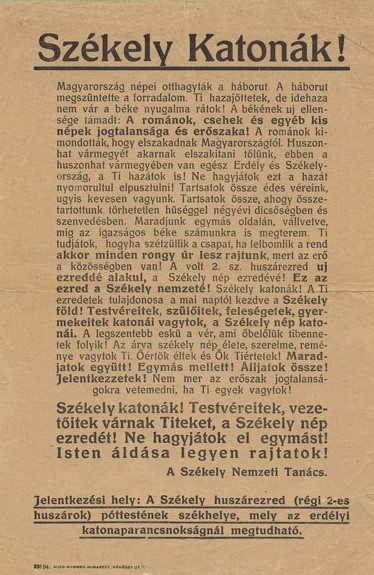
Manifesto of the Székely National Council. Establishment of the Székely Division

On 1 November, one day before Hungary officially laid down arms, Oszkár Jászi met with the Romanian National Council, and discussed the measures needed to maintain civil order in Transylvania. Both Jászi and the Romanian politicians were mainly concerned with the chaos and looting created by the soldiers returning from the front or by various groups, and by the regional republican movements in Oradea and Banat. The Romanian National Council then moved quarters to Arad on 2 November and worked to establish subordinated regional councils in Transylvania and the Romanian National Guards – local militia units led by returning officers.

The task of governing Transylvania at this time was beyond reach for the Romanian National Council. Previously, on 23 October, Rudolf Brandsch – the leader of the German National Council – stood up for the territorial integrity of the Hungarian state, and the Romanian politician Petru Mihalyi contested Vaida-Voevod's right to speak on behalf of all Romanians and argued for a cooperation between Hungarians and Romanians. Furthermore, the Hungarian National Council established the Transylvanian Committee branch based in Cluj/Kolozsvár, and much later, in November, a German-Saxon National Council was formed – mainly following the policies of the larger German National Council, and a Székely National Council which demanded territorial autonomy if the unity of Hungary could not be maintained. Nevertheless, the council – often referred to as Romanian National Central Council during this period to distinguish it from to the local Romanian National Councils – issued directives from 3 November onwards with the purpose of organizing the local councils and the national guards, and at the same time reaffirmed its independence from the Hungarian National Council.

== Total separation ==
On 8 November, following the collapse of the Balkan Front, the Kingdom of Romania declared its intention to re-enter the war against Germany and decided the next day through the High Decree nr.3179 to mobilize its army. On the same day the Romanian National Council of Transylvania issued an ultimatum to the Hungarian government:

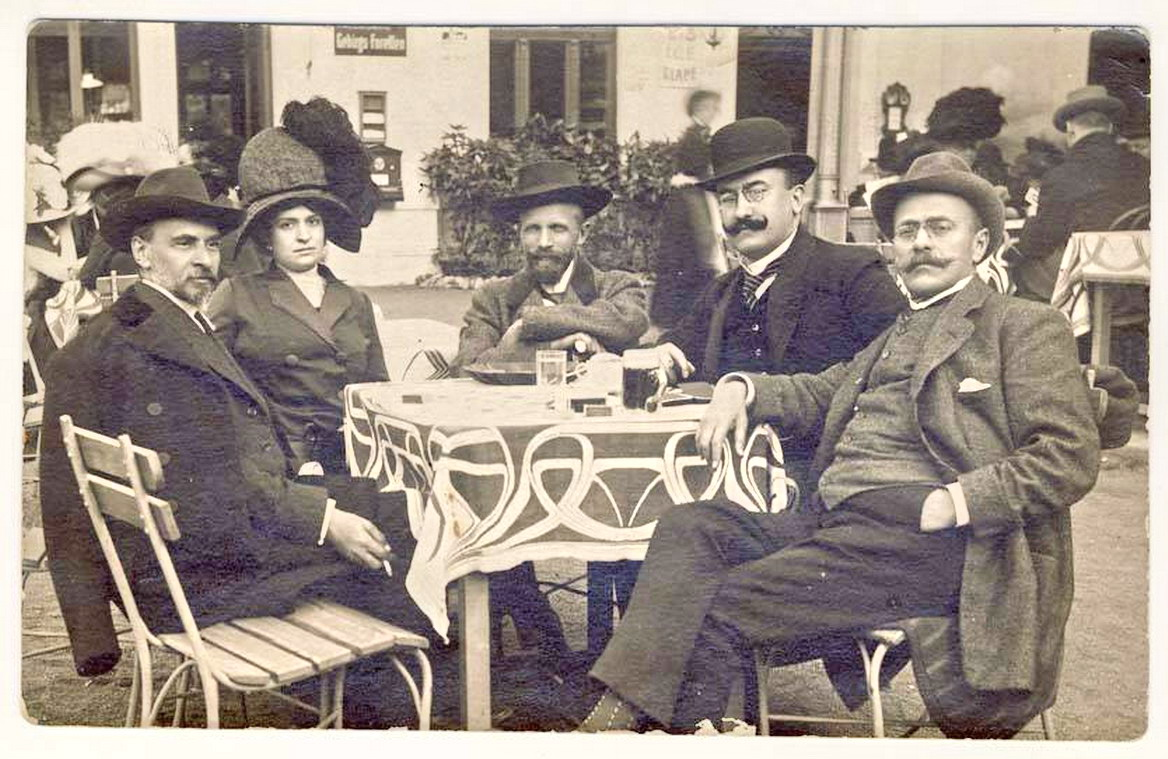
Alexandru Vaida-Voevod and his wife at Karlsbad, in 1911, with George Coșbuc, dr. Ciuta, and I.L Caragiale

The rapid development of events led us to our conviction that, following our right to self-determination, and in the interest of our nation and of the minorities living with us, for the sake of preserving public safety, and the protection of persons and private property, we must take over the full governing authority in parts of Hungary and Transylvania that are populated by Romanians. These areas include the following counties: Torontál, Temes (Timiș), Krassó-Szörény (Caraș-Severin), Arad, Bihar (Bihor), Szatmár (Satu Mare), Máramaros (Maramureș), Beszterce-Naszód (Bistrița-Năsăud), Szolnok-Doboka, Szilágy, Kolozs, Maros-Torda, Torda-Aranyos, Alsó-Fehér, Kisküköllő, Nagyküköllő, Hunyad, Szeben (Sibiu), Brassó (Brașov), Fogaras (Făgăraș), Háromszék, Udvarhely (Odorheiu Secuiesc), and Csík (Ciuc); as well as the parts of Békés, Csanád, and Ugocsa counties populated by Romanians.

The deadline for the response was set for 12 November. The negotiations started on 13 November at Arad, the Hungarian side being represented by Oszkár Jászi along with 24 other delegates. The discussions were tense and from the beginning the Romanian side, represented by Ştefan Cicio Pop, Iosif Flueraș, Vasile Goldiş, Enea Grapini, Ioan Erdely, and Iosif Jumanca protested against the attendance to the meeting of István Apáthy, the President of the Transylvanian Committee, whom they saw as a "typical chauvinist intellectual of the Dualist Hungary era". On the Hungarian side the representatives cited statistics that showed that less than 3 million Romanians inhabited the counties demanded and where other 3.9 million people of other nationalities lived, and declared themselves in favor of the application of the right of self-determination for all. Jászi presented a proposal to organize the region on a similar model to the Swiss cantons in which the Romanian council would have authority only in those counties where Romanians were a majority. The Romanian side asked for the negotiations to be postponed. Arrived on the next day, Iuliu Maniu aided in drafting a reply in which the Romanians rejected the Hungarian proposals, declaring that the Romanians want to have their own sovereign state. A second proposal from Jászi was also rejected in the evening because "the Hungarian government does not recognize the right of the Romanian nation to exercise executive power in the territories inhabited by the Romanian nation". The negotiations failed. Asking Maniu in a private conversation "What do Romanians want?" Jászi received the reply: "Total separation".

The Romanian National Council prepared to organize a national assembly. On 18 November it issued the manifesto "To the Peoples of the World" in which it formally expressed the intention to separate the region from Hungary. Two days later it made the call for the assembly to be held at Alba Iulia/Gyulafehérvár on 1 December. The Romanian army entered Transylvania just days before the manifesto proclamation.

== The Great National Assemblies and the Hungarian–Romanian War ==
The opportunity to hold elections became a veritable reason for celebration among Romanians. By open ballot 1,228 delegates were chosen and they were joined in their travel to Alba Iulia by an estimated 50,000 other enthusiasts. As Lucian Blaga saw the events:

On one side of the road, the wagons of the Romanians were moving towards the city, their wheels squealing in the snowy ruts, each one of them resounding with a whine and filled with elation, while on the other side, in the same direction, the German army from Romania was retreating.

Protest of the Supreme Commissariat for Transylvania against the annexation of Transylvania to Romania

The Romanian Council already started the discussions in the city regarding the resolution to be voted on 29 November and the outcome was presented to the delegates on 1 December. Along with the union with the Kingdom of Romania it stipulated the formation of a Grand Romanian National Council composed of 210 representatives selected from the elected delegates. On 2 December, the Grand Council delegated legislative and executive powers to the Ruling Council, a committee of fifteen political leaders. In opposition to the Ruling Council, István Apáthy was named government commissioner for Transylvania, leader of the Supreme Commissariat for Transylvania, by the Hungarian National Council, and, from 2 to 22 December, Transylvania had two ruling bodies, each subordinated to the national governments of the Kingdom of Romania and the First Hungarian Republic, respectively.

As the Romanian army advanced towards Cluj/Kolozsvár, Apáthy organized a popular assembly in which Hungarians reasserted their will to remain part of Hungary. The Romanian army entered Cluj/Kolozsvár just two days after, on 24 December, and the Supreme Commissariat for Transylvania was disbanded. Then, on 9 January 1919 the German-Saxon National Council approved the resolution adopted by the Great National Assembly of Alba Iulia, leaving the Ruling Council as the only governing body of Transylvania, a situation that was kept until 2 April 1920, when it was replaced by an Unification Commission incorporated in the Romanian government.

== Gallery ==
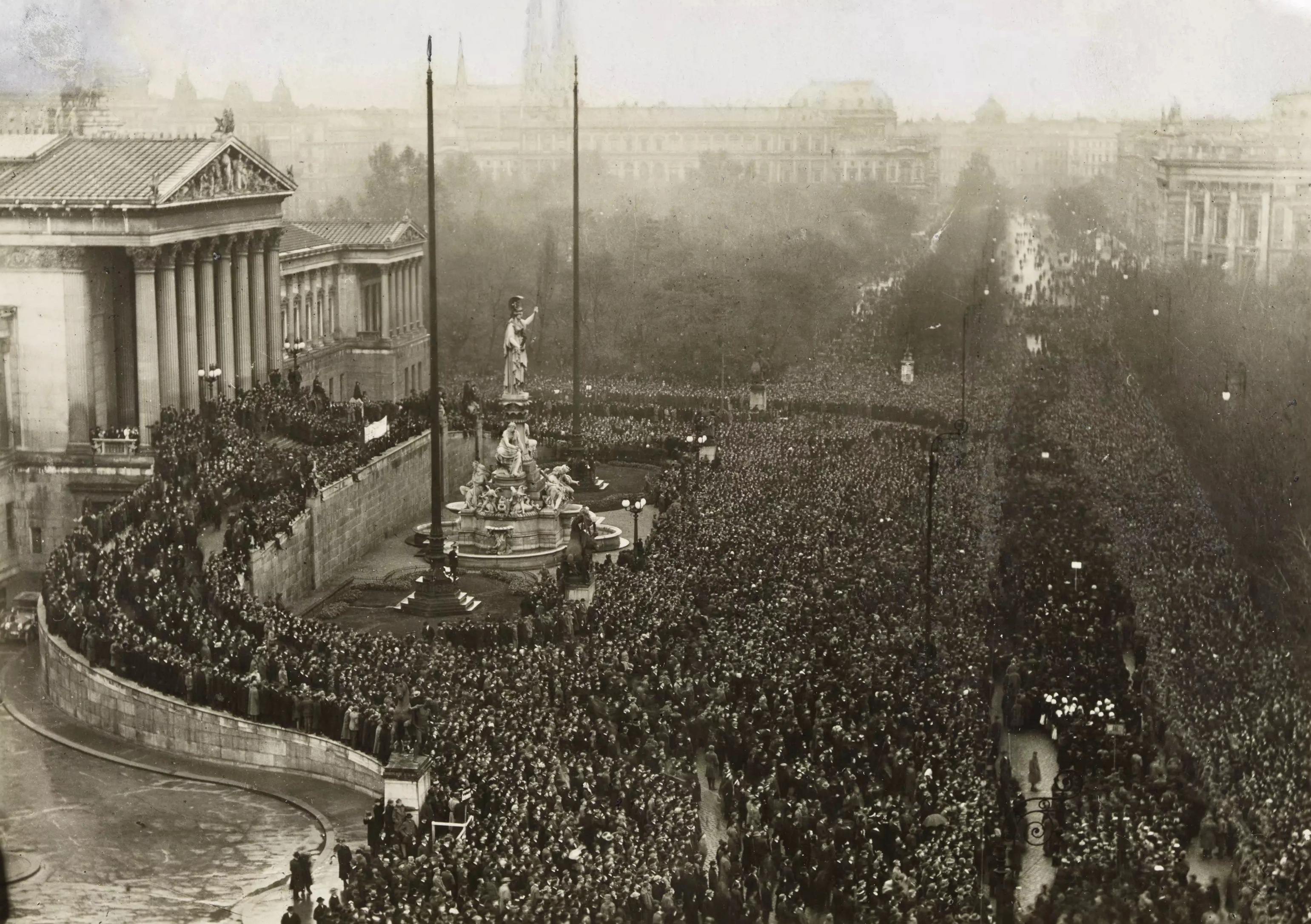
Crowds in front of the parliament building in Vienna on the day of the proclamation of the Republic of German-Austria on November 12, 1918

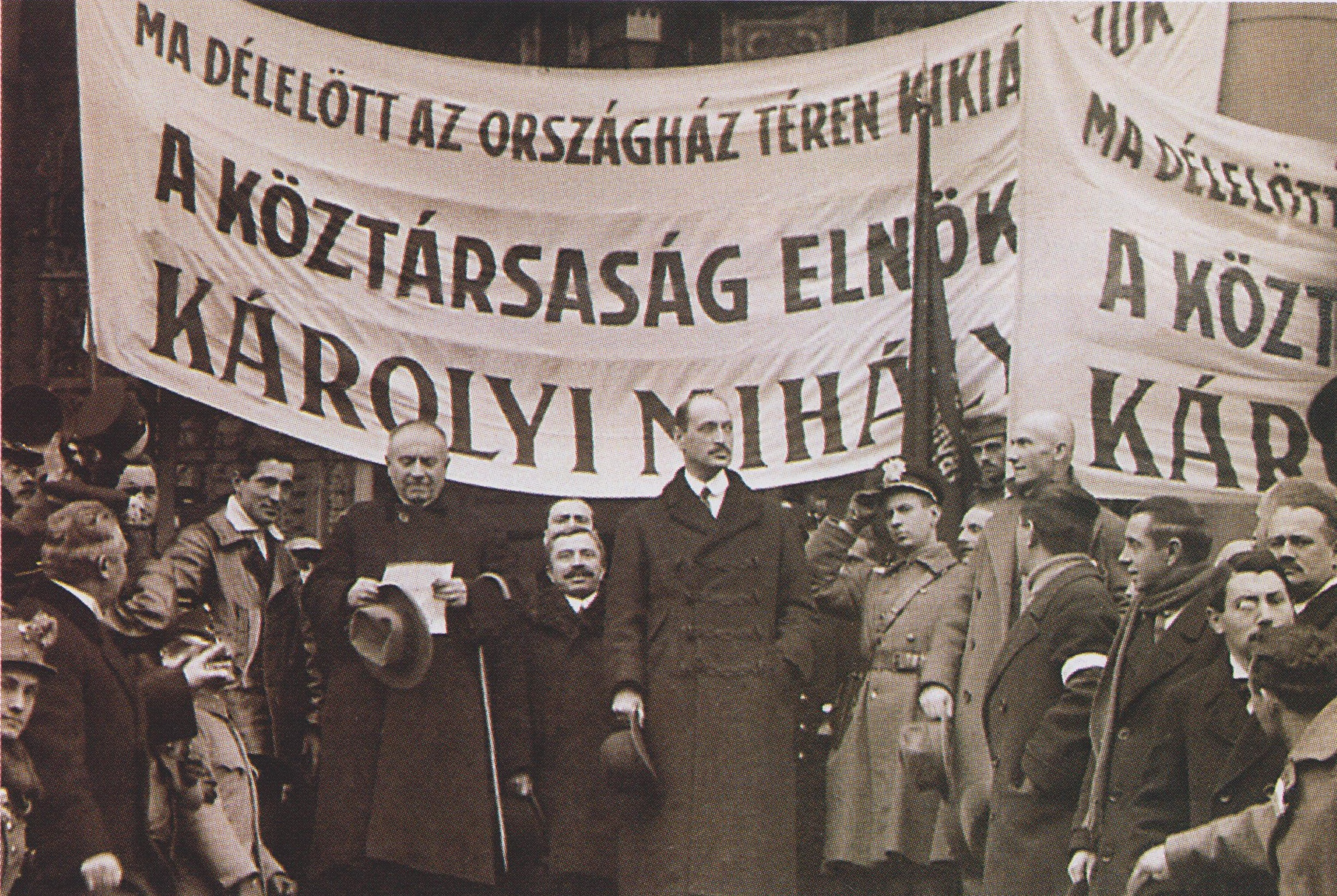
Declaration of the Hungarian Republic on 16 November 1918 by Prime Minister Count Mihály Károlyi (right) and János Hock (1859–1936), President of the National Council

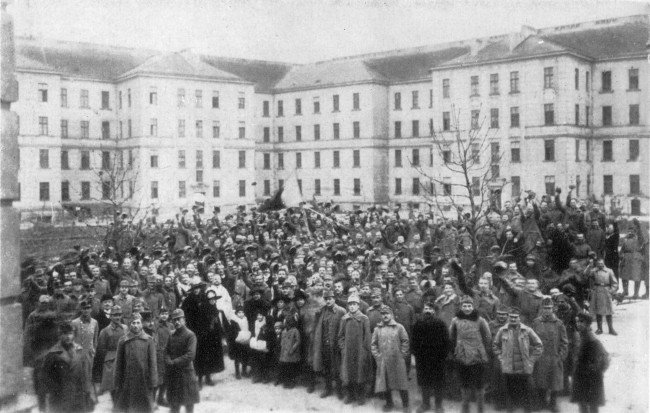
Submission of the Oath of Faith to Romania, of the soldiers from Hunedoara stationed in Vienna, 17 November 1918

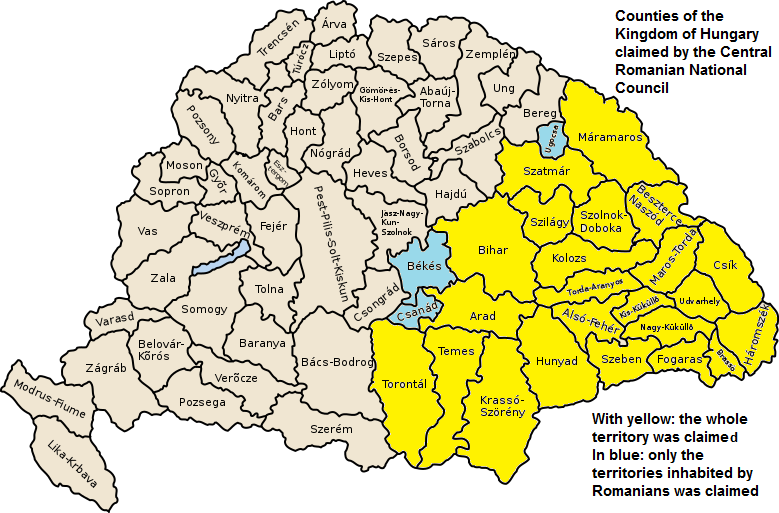
Counties of the Kingdom of Hungary claimed by the Romanian National Council on 9 November 1918

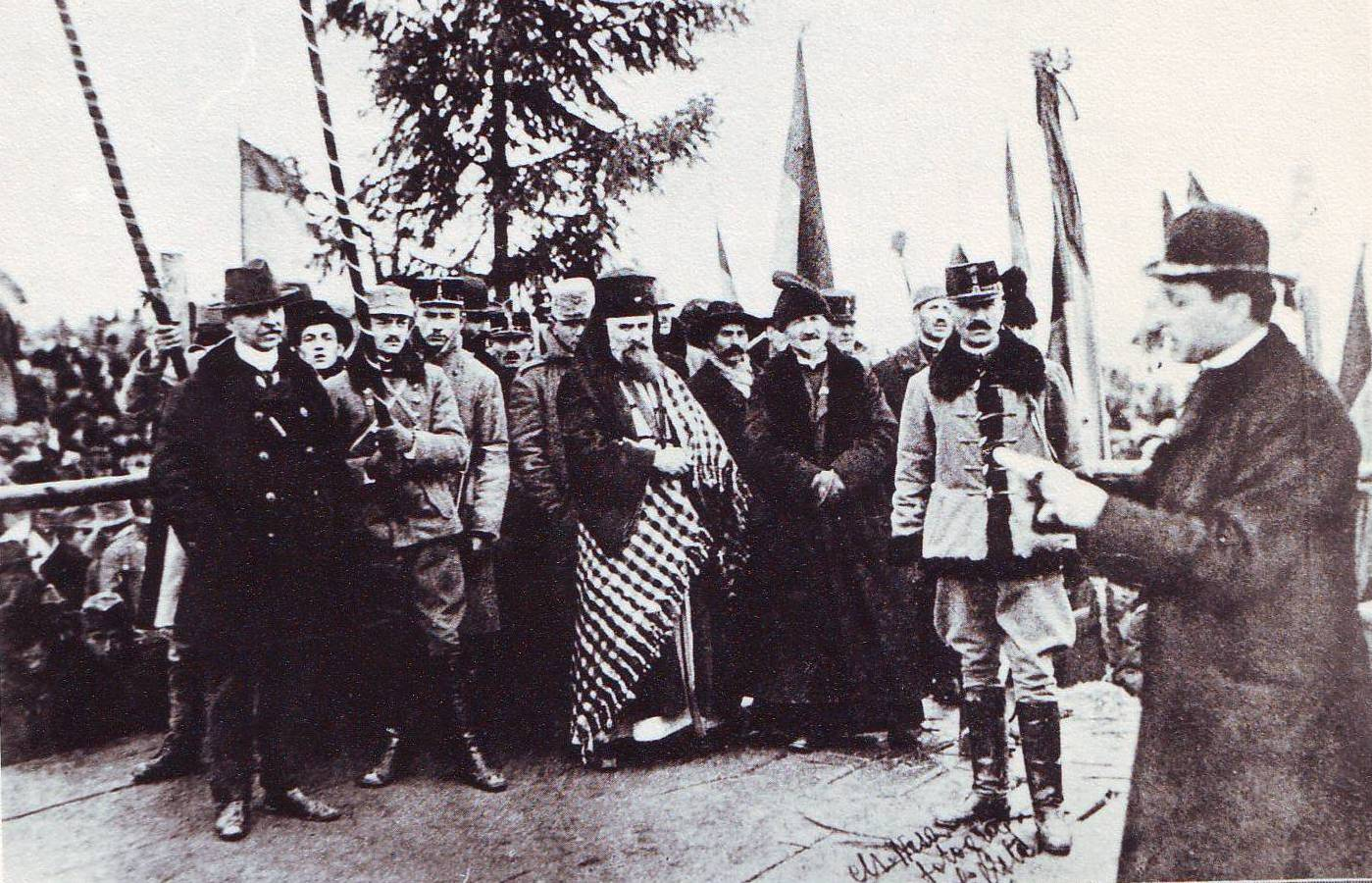
Romanian Catholic Bishop Iuliu Hossu, reading in the Assembly of the People the Act Union of Transylvania to Romania, 1 December 1918
